= We the Fest =

Annual festival in Jakarta, Indonesia

We The Fest
- Genre: Pop; rock; EDM; hip hop; indie
- Locations: Gelora Bung Karno Sports Complex, Jakarta, Indonesia (2022–present); Parkir Timur Senayan, Jakarta, Indonesia (2014–2016); Jakarta International Expo, Jakarta, Indonesia (2017–2019)
- Years active: 2014–2020; 2022–2024
- Founders: Ismaya Live
- Attendance: 50,000 for 3 days in 2017
- Website: www.wethefest.com

We The Fest is an annual summer festival of music, arts, fashion and food in Jakarta, Indonesia. The first edition was held on August 24, 2014 at Parkir Timur Senayan. In 2017, the event was moved to Jakarta International Expo Kemayoran. The event features many genres of music, including pop, rock, indie, hip hop and electronic dance music. The festival is organized by Ismaya Live. We the Fest took a break in 2025 before returning in 2026.

== 2014 ==
The 2014 We The Fest took place on Sunday 24 August 2014 at Parkir Timur Senayan.

Line-up

Clown Chella Stage	Banana Palooza Stage
Ellie Goulding; 21:45; Banks; 20:30; Azealia Banks; 19:15; Miami Horror; 18:00; Timeflies; 16:30; Maliq & D'Essentials; 15:30	Havana Brown; 21:00; Mayer Hawthorne (DJ set); 20:00; RAC (DJ set); 19:00; Jessie Andrews; 18:00; Goldroom (DJ set); 16:30; Sore; 15:15; Lala; 14:15; Vox; 13:15; The Experience Brothers; 12:15

== 2015 ==
The 2015 edition of We The Fest was held on Sunday 9 August 2015 at Parkir Timur Senayan.

Line-up

Clown Chella Stage	Banana Palooza Stage	ART-Plugged Stage
Madeon; 22:05; Passion Pit (cancelled); 20:50; Jessie Ware; 19:20; Flight Facilities; 17:50; Echosmith; 16:30; Neonomora; 15:25; Teza Sumendra; 14:25	Kimbra; 21:30; Cyril Hahn; 20:05; Wes Barker; 19:35; RÜFÜS; 18:50; Sheppard; 17:50; Darius; 16:20; Panama; 15:25; 360; 14:20; L'Alphalpha; 13:25; Elephant Kind; 12:30	Blotymama; 19:35; Bubugiri; 18:35; Wes Barker; 17:50; Danilla; 16:35; MarcoMarche; 15:30; Scaller; 14:05

== 2016 ==
The third edition was held on two days for the first time. It was held on Saturday 13 August and Sunday 14 August. The sixteen international acts and twenty-five local acts were set to perform in three stages. The WTF Stage was presented by Urban Gigs, while The Stage Is B.A.N.A.N.A.S!!! was presented by H&M, and The Another Stage was presented by Joox in collaboration with Indonesian independent music label, Demajors.

=== Submit Your Band ===
For the first time, Ismaya Live announced a competition called ‘Submit Your Band’ where the three chosen bands would have a chance to perform at the 2016 We The Fest. The three chosen bands were Hello Benji & The Cobra, Pijar and Westjam Nation. One of the finalists, Beeswax, also performed.

Result	Finalists
The Top 3	Hello Benji & The Cobra; Pijar; Westjam Nation
Finalists	Arc Yellow; Bedchamber; Beeswax; Circarama; Gizpel; Littlelute; The Boris Suit

Line-up

Saturday, August 13, 2016
WTF Stage	The Stage Is... B.A.N.A.N.A.S Stage	Another Stage
Macklemore & Ryan Lewis; 22:30; CL; 21:20; Purity Ring; 20:00; Sam Feldt; 18:20; Homogenic; 17:00; Dekat; 15:50; Matter Halo; 14:45	Hermitude; 23:30; George Maple; 22:25; Hayden James; 20:55; Trees & Wild; 19:55; Dream Koala; 18:35; Rich Chigga; 17:20; Polka Wars; 16:15; Sajama Cut; 15:10; Pijar; 14:10	Four Twnty; 21:20; Abenk Alter; 19:50; Adhitia Sofyan; 18:20; Silampukau; 16:30; Deredia; 15:00
Sunday, August 14, 2016
WTF Stage	The Stage Is... B.A.N.A.N.A.S Stage	Another Stage
Mark Ronson (DJ); 23:00; The 1975; 21:35; The Temper Trap; 20:05; Breakbot (Live); 18:20; Sheila On 7; 16:50; Naif; 15:45; Barasuara; 14:45	Blonde; 22:30; Ryan Hemsworth; 20:55; Ta-ku (featuring Wafia); 19:40; Alina Baraz; 18:20; Kimokal; 17:05; Kelompok Penerbang Roket; 16:05; Dried Cassava; 15:05; Westjam Nation; 14:10	Monkey To Millionaire; 21:30; Indische Party; 20:00; Sommerhaar; 18:30; Lightcraft; 17:00; Hello Benji and The Cobra; 15:30; Beeswax; 14:00

== 2017 ==
Ismaya Live announced that the fourth edition of We The Fest would be held over three days. It was held on Friday 11 August, Saturday 12 August and Sunday 13 August at Jakarta International Expo Kemayoran, North Jakarta, Jakarta.

=== Submit Your Music ===
On May 8, Ismaya Live announced the return of Submit Your Band, but for this year, a solo artist could also participate.

Result	Finalists
The Top 3	Onar; The Panturas; Winter Issues
Finalists	Dopest Dope; Glaskaca; Makmur Sejahtera; Reality Club; Rebel Suns; Secret Meadow; Strange Fruit; Surkensonik; Wangi Gitaswara

Line-up

Friday, August 11, 2017
WTF Stage	The Stage Is... B.A.N.A.N.A.S Stage	Another Stage
The Kooks; 23:50; Kodaline; 22:20; Charli XCX; 20:50; Yuna; 19:30; Tuxedo; 18:20; The SIGIT; 17:05; Stars & Rabbit; 16:00	Andre Dunant; 01:45; Zhu; 00:35; Lido; 23:05; Gryffin; 21:40; Shura; 20:20; Scaller; 19:20; Agrikulture; 18:20; Bottlesmoker; 17:05; Teddy Adhitya; 16:00	Fun on a Weekend; 23:15; Rock N Roll Mafia X Elephant Kind; 21:55; Rendy Pandugo; 20:45; Jason Ranti; 19:45; Andre Harihandoyo & Sonic People; 18:20; Adrian Khalif; 17:00; Renita Martadinata; 16:00
Saturday, August 12, 2017
WTF Stage	The Stage Is... B.A.N.A.N.A.S Stage	Another Stage
Cash Cash; 23:40; Phoenix; 22:10; Gnash; 20:50; Epik High; 19:35; Potret; 18:20; Kunokini, Svaraliane, She Makes War & Dani; 16:50; The Hydrant X Silampukau; 15:30	w.W; 01:20; TroyBoi; 00:05; Snakehips; 22:55; Autograf; 21:40; Daya; 20:30; LANY; 19:20; The Adams; 18:20; Mondo Gascaro; 17:05; Emir Hermono, A. Nayaka & Rayi Putra; 16:00; Rumahsakit; 15:00	Yesterday Afternoon Boys; 23:25; Monkey to Millionaire; 22:30; Barefood; 21:35; Lightcraft; 20:40; Easy Tiger; 19:45; The Panturas; 18:20; Winter Issue; 16:35; Barasuara X Scaller; 15:30
Sunday, August 13, 2017
WTF Stage	The Stage Is... B.A.N.A.N.A.S Stage	Another Stage
Big Sean; 23:40; G-Eazy; 22:10; Jonas Blue; 20:40; Dua Lipa; 19:40; Mocca X Payung Teduh; 18:20; Raisa; 16:50; Danilla; 15:30	Wave Racer; 23:50; Hot Chip (DJ set); 22:25; Cosmo's Midnight; 21:10; Gamaliel Audrey Cantika with Isyana Sarasvati, The Overtunes, Fatin & Jaz; 19:40; Vallis Alps; 18:35; Elephant Kind; 17:05; Goodnight Electric; 16:00; Ramengvrl; 15:00	Diskopantera; 21:15; Onar; 20:25.Feast; 19:30; Indische Party; 18:20; Anomalyst; 17:10; Mustache & Beard; 16:25; Vira Talisa; 15:30

== 2018 ==
The fifth edition of We the Fest was held on July 20–22, 2018.

Line-up

WTF Stage

Friday: Gamaliel Audrey Cantika, Maliq & D'Essentials, Albert Hammond Jr., Nick Murphy, James Bay, Alt-J

Saturday: Afgan Isyana Rendy, Efek Rumah Kaca, Barasuara, Honne, Lorde, Odesza

Sunday: White Shoes & The Couples Company, Padi Reborn, The Neighbourhood, Vince Staples, Miguel, SZA

The Stage Is Bananas

Friday: Mooner, Pijar, Polka Wars, Petra Sihombing, Ramengvrl (feat. GBrand & Keilanboi), Moon Boots, Louis the Child, What So Not, Aydra (feat. Prince Husein)

Saturday: Mantra Vutura, Seringai, The Sam Willows, Andien, Eric Nam, Majid Jordan, Medasin, Party Favor, w.W (featuring MC DRWE & Soul ID)

Sunday: Teza Sumendra, Kimokal, Neonomora, Dipha Barus, SG Lewis, Petit Biscuit, Basenji

Another Stage

Friday: Garhana, Monkey to Millionaire, SoftAnimal, Neurotic, Nonaria, Laze, Patricia Schuldtz (featuring Bayu Risa & Yacko)

Saturday: Texpack, Garside, Semenjana, Bam Mastro, Matter Mos, A. Nayaka & The Blue Room Boys, Fun on a Weekend x Emotion All Stars, Diskoria

Sunday: Rayssa Dynta, Thearosa, Pee Wee Gaskins, Greybox & The Standstill Squad, Midnight Fusic, Abenk Alter, Bitzmika

== 2019 ==
The 2019 edition was held on July 19–21. The first phase of the line-up was announced on February 23. The second phase was announced on April 10.

Line-up WTF Stage

Friday: Fourtwnty, Dewa 19 ft. Ari Lasso & Dul Jaelani, Dean and Rad Museum, Capital Cities, Bazzi, Troye Sivan

Saturday: Eva Celia, Sabrina Claudio, Anne-Marie, Daniel Caesar, Travis

Sunday: Tulus, Dipha Barus, 6lack, Joji, Rae Sremmurd

The Stage Is Bananas

Friday: Glaskaca, Sore, The Adams, Alvvays, Cade, Jai Wolf, San Holo

Saturday: Dream Coterie, Barasuara, RAN, Jess Connelly, Baynk, Nina Las Vegas, Anna Lunoe

Sunday: .Feast, Elephant Kind, Warpaint, Cigarettes After Sex, Cashmere Cat, Yaeji

Another Stage

Friday: The Cat Police, Puti Chitara, Gerald Situmorang & Sri Hanuraga, Sal Priadi, Duara, Stan x w.W ft. Dave Slick

Saturday: Grrrl Gang, Nadin Amizah, Matter Halo, Endah N Rhesa, Pamungkas, Petra Sihombing ft. Enrico Octaviano, Fun on a Weekend ft. Soul Menace Crew

Sunday: Kelelawar Malam, Noirless, The Panturas, Kunto Aji, Dekat, Coldiac

WTF Park Stage

Friday: Amboro, Asteriska, Tuan Tigabelas

Saturday: Ify Alyssa, Hindia, Ardhito Pramono

Sunday: Kurosuke, Heidi, Tanayu

== 2020 ==
The 2020 edition was scheduled to be held on 14-16 August 2020 at Jakarta International Expo, Kemayoran, North Jakarta, but cancelled due to the COVID-19 pandemic. The first phase of the line-up was announced on February 12, 2020. The festival was accolated to a livestreaming format, held on 26 and 27 September.

Virtual Home Edition Line-up

- Lewis Capaldi
- Masego
- Oh Wonder
- Autograf
- Chilli.Dip (Dipha Barus × Vanessa Budihardja)
- Goldroom
- Isyana Sarasvati
- Keshi
- Maliq & D'Essentials
- RAC
- Vidi Aldiano
- Yura Yunita
- Diskoria
- Endah & Rhesa
- Gabber Modus Operandi
- Hindia
- Hondo
- Jason Ranti
- Kallula
- Kunto Aji
- LONE
- Mantra Vutura with Elda Suryani, Natasha Udu and Agatha Pricilla
- Moon Gang
- Nadin Amizah
- Pamungkas
- Patricia Schuldtz
- w.W

== 2022 ==
The 2022 edition was held on 23–25 September 2022 at Gelora Bung Karno Sports Complex, Senayan, Kebayoran Baru, South Jakarta. The festival was headlined by Offset, Swae Lee, Jackson Wang and CL.

Line-ups

We the Fest Stage
Friday, 23 September	Saturday, 24 September	Sunday, 25 September
Jackson Wang; Pink Sweats; Beabadoobee; Pamungkas; Afgan	R3hab; Offset; CL; Isyana Sarasvati; Noah	Swae Lee; Oh Wonder; Jeremy Zucker; Dewa 19 featuring Ello
This Stage Is Bananas
What So Not; Bag Raiders; Lyodra; Petra Sihombing; Danilla	Dipha Barus; Surf Mesa; Bondax; Tulus; Sorn; Zack Tabudlo	Snakehips; Shallou; Laleilmanino & Friends; The Adams; Raisa
Another Stage
Ardhito Pramono; Sore; Bilal Indrajaya; Ali; Teddy Adhitya	Oomleo Berkaraoke featuring Ardhito Pramono; Hindia; Vidi Aldiano; Hondo; Perunggu	Maliq & D'Essentials; Nadin Amizah; Idgitaf; Gangga; Avhath
WTF Park Stage
Prou Music; Samo; Agnimaya; Monkey to Millionaire	Astera; Hursa; Radhini; Rendy Pandugo	Scaller; Alex Gulla; Basboi; Oslo Ibrahim

== 2023 ==
The 2023 edition was held on 21–23 July 2023 at the Gelora Bung Karno Sports Complex. The 1975, Lewis Capaldi, and Giveon were supposed to perform but cancelled.

Line-ups

We the Fest Stage
Friday, 21 July	Saturday, 22 July	Sunday, 23 July
The Strokes; The Kid Laroi; Porter Robinson; Yura Yunita; Kunto Aji	Gryffin (Live); Daniel Caesar; Ty Dolla Sign; Maliq & D'Essentials; Gigi; The Adams	NxWorries (Anderson .Paak & Knxwledge); ASAP Ferg; Sheila on 7; Cokelat; Raisa; Hindia
The Stage Is Bananas
Elderbrook; Lee Hi; Kahitna; RINI; The Changcuters	Project Pop; Sabrina Carpenter; Dermot Kennedy; Peach Tree Rascals; Rafi Sudirman; Aruma	ALYPH featuring A. Nayaka & Ben Utomo; Tiara Andini; Alexander 23; Dhruv; Jake Scott; Syarikat Idola Remaja
Another Stage
David Bayu; Barasuara; DeVita; Efek Rumah Kaca	Lomba Sihir; Mocca; Sorn feat. Seungyon & Denise Julia; Rock N Roll Mafia	Ali; Ziva Magnolya; Kurosuke; Sajama Cut; Mikha Angelo

== 2024 ==
The 2024 edition was held on 19 to 21 July at the Gelora Bung Karno Sports Complex, Jakarta, Indonesia. J Balvin, Joji and Peggy Gou headlined the tenth anniversary of the festival.

The Submit Your Music competition was held in collaboration with Indonesian music blog, Pophariini. Guu, Jo Soegono, Jordan Susanto, and Rrag won the opportunity to perform at the festival. Other finalists included Cito Gakso, Mentari Novel, Puff Punch, and Starducc.

Line-up

We the Fest Stage
Friday, 19 July	Saturday, 20 July	Sunday, 21 July
J Balvin; Russ; XG; White Shoes & the Couples Company; Pee Wee Gaskins	Peggy Gou; 3 Diva (Krisdayanti, Ruth Sahanaya & Titi DJ); Bibi; Tiger JK & Yoon Mi-rae; Marcell; Bernadya	Joji; Omar Apollo; Turnstile; The Adams; Reality Club
This Stage Is Bananas
Dipha Barus presents Aneka Dansa; Oliver Tree; Alec Benjamin; Nadin Amizah performing Konser Selamat Ulang Tahun; Skandal	Farrt!; Lastlings; Henry Moodie; Teddy Adhitya; Sore	Maliq & D'Essentials; Rizky Febian featuring Mahalini and Gangga; Teddy Swims; Peach Pit
WTF Park Stage
Joplyn; The Sigit; Sal Priadi; Jubilee Marisa; Jordan Susanto	Bilal Indrajaya; GUU; Satine Zaneta; Avhath; Xandega; Rrag	Ali; Zeke and the Popo; White Chorus; Ylona Garcia & Haven; Jo Soegono; Bank
