= Joyland Festival =

Annual music festival in Indonesia

- Locations: Senayan Swimming Stadium Park, Senayan, Jakarta (2012–2013); Senayan Archery Field, Senayan, Jakarta (2019); Bhagawan Park, Nusa Dua, Bali (2022); GBK Softball Stadium, Senayan, Jakarta (2022); Peninsula Island, Nusa Dua, Bali (2023–present); GBK Baseball Stadium, Senayan, Jakarta (2023–present)
- Years active: 2012—2013; 2019; 2022–present
- Founders: Ferry Dharmawan
- Organiser: G Production (2012–2013); Plainsong Live (2019–present)
- Website: joylandfest.com

Joyland Festival is an annual music festival held in Indonesia. The festival also features film screening, stand-up comedy performances, various workshops, family activities and local community markets.

== History ==
The concept of Joyland Festival was first conceived and executed during the 2011 Djakarta Artmosphere by G Production, but held as a parallel music festival the year after. The inaugural edition of the festival was held over two days, on 16 to 17 June 2012 at the Senayan Swimming Stadium Park located inside the Gelora Bung Karno Sports Complex, Jakarta, Indonesia. The festival's first two editions highlighted local artists, particularly independent acts. After the 2013 festival, the next edition had not been announced since.

In 2019, Ferry Dharmawan, now under Plainsong Live production, announced the revival of the festival. It was held on 7–8 December 2019 at the Senayan Archery Field, Jakarta, headlined by Washed Out, Frankie Cosmos, Naif, Efek Rumah Kaca and Jamie Aditya.

The festival was put on hold during the COVID-19 pandemic until the 2022 edition was announced in Bali. It marked the first edition to be held outside of Jakarta. The line-up featured huge local acts, combining mainstream and independent scene across Indonesia. Felix Martua of NME gave the festival edition in Bali a perfect rating: five stars out of five, commented that it "set a benchmark and a blueprint for Indonesian music festivals" post the pandemic. The festival was also held in Jakarta subsequently on 4–6 November 2022, headlined by Cornelius, Moonchild, Years & Years, Thundercat, Mild High Club, Secret Number, Tennis, PREP, and Phum Viphurit.

The 2023 Bali festival was held on 17 to 19 March at the Peninsula Island, Nusa Dua and headlined by Phoenix, M.I.A. and Sigrid. The 2023 Jakarta festival was held on 24 to 26 November at the GBK Baseball Stadium, South Jakarta and headlined by Interpol, Mew, and Fleet Foxes. The festival then teamed up with media company Whiteboard Journal to curate Southeast Asian acts for its lineup.

The Bali edition of the festival was held from 1 to 3 March 2024 at the Peninsula Island, Nusa Dua. It was headlined by James Blake and Kings of Convenience. The 2024 Jakarta festival was held on 22 to 24 November at the GBK Baseball Stadium, South Jakarta and headlined by St. Vincent, Air, a collaboration set of Hyukoh and Sunset Rollercoaster, and Bombay Bicycle Club.

In 2025, both Bali and Jakarta editions were cancelled. A smaller version of the festival, billed as Joyland Sessions, took place in Jakarta in November 2025. It was headlined by TV Girl and L'Impératrice.

== Festival line-ups by year ==
=== 2012 ===
16 June

- Pure Saturday
- BRNDLS
- Bangkutaman
- Polyester Embassy
- Luky Annash
- Harlan
- L'Alphalpha
- The Experience Brothers
- Swimming Elephants

17 June

- Efek Rumah Kaca
- White Shoes & the Couples Company
- Dialog Dini Hari
- Zeke Khaseli
- Anda
- Gribs
- Stars & Rabbit
- Backwood Sun
- Tristan

=== 2013 ===
7 December

- White Shoes & the Couples Company
- Rock N Roll Mafia
- The Trees & the Wild
- Dialog Dini Hari
- Leonardo and His Impeccable Six
- Luky Annash
- Polka Wars
- Banda Neira
- We Love ABC
- Dried Cassava

8 December

- Sore
- Tika and The Dissidents
- Float
- Tigapagi
- Sajama Cut
- Bing
- Angsa & Serigala
- Sentimental Moods
- Space System

=== 2019 ===
Joyland Stage
| Saturday, 7 December | Sunday, 8 December |
| Washed Out; Yves Tumor; Jamie Aditya; Eva Celia; Tops; The Trees & the Wild; Mooner; Ardhito Pramono | Barasuara; Frankie Cosmos; Hatchie; Anna of the North; Maliq & D'Essentials; Hindia; Naif; Hondo |

Lily Pad; Curated by Efek Rumah Kaca
| Saturday, 7 December | Sunday, 8 December |
| White Shoes & the Couples Company; Sir Dandy; Mondo Gascaro & Rien Djamain & Oele Pattiselanno; Bayangan; Endah N Rhesa; Poem Modulation; Duara; Mad Madmen | Efek Rumah Kaca; The Adams; Jirapah; Dialog Dini Hari; Puti Chitara; Dialita; Made Mawut |

=== 2022 ===
==== Bali ====
Joyland Stage
| Friday, 25 March | Saturday, 26 March | Sunday, 27 March |
| White Shoes & the Couples Company; Danilla; Lomba Sihir; Nadin Amizah; Agrikulture × Rock N Roll Mafia; Yura Yunita; The Panturas | The Adams; Raisa; The Sigit; Senyawa; Basboi; Kunto Aji | Diskoria; Pamungkas; Maliq & D'Essentials; Isyana Sarasvati; Soulfood; Grrrl Gang; Bedchamber |

==== Jakarta ====
Joyland Stage
| Friday, 4 November | Saturday, 5 November | Sunday, 6 November |
| Cornelius; Moonchild; Afgan; Project Pop; Koil; Years & Years | Thundercat; Mild High Club; JKT48; Secret Number; Kunto Aji; Grrrl Gang | Tennis; PREP; Phum Viphurit; Isyana Sarasvati; White Shoes & the Couples Company; Dialog Dini Hari |

Plainsong Live Stage
| Friday, 4 November | Saturday, 5 November | Sunday, 6 November |
| The Adams; Seringai; Kiefer; Monita Tahalea; HIVI! | Tulus; Sales; Scaller; Sivia; Sajama Cut | Hindia; RAN; Efek Rumah Kaca; Yura Yunita; The Panturas; Gamaliél |

Lily Pad
| Friday, 4 November | Saturday, 5 November | Sunday, 6 November |
| Salon R&B; Zigi Zaga; Reruntuh; Ali | Perunggu; Skandal; Batavia Collective; Crayola Eyes | Reality Club; Monkey to Millionaire; BAP.; The Dare |

=== 2023 ===
==== Bali ====
Joyland Stage
| Friday, 17 March | Saturday, 18 March | Sunday, 19 March |
| M.I.A.; Tulus; Crumb; Yura Yunita; Reality Club | Sigrid; Black Midi; Raisa; Andien; Dialog Dini Hari | Phoenix; Hindia; Chai; The Adams; Polka Wars |

Plainsong Live Stage
| Friday, 17 March | Saturday, 18 March | Sunday, 19 March |
| Dipha Barus; Black Country, New Road; Black Lips; Ali; Summer Salt; Guernica Club | Barasuara; Navicula; Stars and Rabbit; Teddy Adhitya; Dried Cassava | Bloodmoon; White Shoes & the Couples Company; GAC; Kunto Aji; Assia Keva |

Lily Pad
| Friday, 17 March | Saturday, 18 March | Sunday, 19 March |
| Flora Yin Wong; Plaur; Paradise Bangkok Molam International Band; Sundancer; Ata Ratu | Raissa; Naken; Melati ESP; Rub of Rub; Dangerdope; The Secret Agents | Celina; Mairakilla; Gozal; Kirara; Rollfast; Made Mawut |

==== Jakarta ====
Joyland Stage
| Friday, 24 November | Saturday, 25 November | Sunday, 26 November |
| Mew; D4vd; Fazerdaze; Ali; David Bayu | Fleet Foxes; The Adams; Mildlife; Maliq & D'Essentials; Homeshake | Interpol; The Beths; Grrrl Gang; Santamonica; Sore; BAP. |

Plainsong Live Stage
| Friday, 24 November | Saturday, 25 November | Sunday, 26 November |
| Last Dinosaurs; EaJ; Benny Sings; Kamaal Williams; Lomba Sihir | Bloc Party; Squid; Wednesday Campanella; Glass Beams; Luby Sparks | Alvvays; Otoboke Beaver; Rock N Roll Mafia; Reality Club; Mocca |

Lily Pad
| Friday, 24 November | Saturday, 25 November | Sunday, 26 November |
| White Shoes & the Couples Company; The Panturas; L'Alphalpha; Bernadya; Jevin Julian | Avhath; Thee Marloes; Kurosuke; The Brandals; Bayangan; CURB | Gabber Modus Operandi; Leipzig; Dongker; Yonlapa; White Chorus; Sobs; Lair |

=== 2024 ===
==== Bali ====
Joyland Stage
| Friday, 1 March | Saturday, 2 March | Sunday, 3 March |
| Shintaro Sakamoto; The Adams; The Sigit; White Shoes & the Couples Company | Whitney; Eva Celia; Kings of Convenience; Bilal Indrajaya | James Blake; Vansire; Isyana Sarasvati |

Plainsong Live Stage
| Friday, 1 March | Saturday, 2 March | Sunday, 3 March |
| Pearl & the Oysters; Stars and Rabbit; Nadin Amizah; ENVY* | Gilles Peterson; Bank; Ali; Mantra Vutura | Todd Terje; Hindia; The Walters; Dialog Dini Hari |

Lily Pad
| Friday, 1 March | Saturday, 2 March | Sunday, 3 March |
| LNHD B2B rEmPiT g0dDe$$; Rule Kabatram; Kasimyn B2B Mairakilla; DVY; Graung | Praed; Kadapat; Kiko/o; Putu Septa & Nata Swara; Mona Evie; Gumata Gumitit Gospell | Blush; Rắn Cạp Đuôi; Mong Tong; Gangsar; Asep Nayak; Lunadira |

==== Jakarta ====
Joyland Stage
| Friday, 22 November | Saturday, 23 November | Sunday, 24 November |
| Air; Real Estate; Bubble Tea & Cigarettes; Bank | Ali; Hyukoh × Sunset Rollercoaster; John Carroll Kirby; Maliq & D'Essentials; Sigmun | Bombay Bicycle Club; Pentas Sihir (Hindia × Lomba Sihir); Mono; Brainstory |

Plainsong Live Stage
| Friday, 22 November | Saturday, 23 November | Sunday, 24 November |
| St. Vincent; The S.I.G.I.T.; Silica Gel; .Feast | Majelis Lidah Berduri (Hujan Orang Mati set); Efek Rumah Kaca (Konser Rimpang set); Surprise Chef; Automatic | Balming Tiger; ~~Banks~~ (Note: The festival organizer cancelled Banks' appearance, without stating a reason. Prior to the cancellation announcement, Banks' appearance in the lineup garnered attention on social media following her posts in support of Israeli genocide in Palestine.); Blueboy; The Adams; DYGL |

Lily Pad
| Friday, 22 November | Saturday, 23 November | Sunday, 24 November |
| Prontaxan; Khun Narin Electric Phin Band; DJ YESYES; White Shoes & the Couples Company; Plastic; Drizzly. | Masaya Fantasista & Mikey Varot (Jazzy Sport); The 5.6.7.8's; Cami Layé Okún; The Panturas with Giriwangsa Tropical Unit; Bosborot; The Cottons | Habibi Funk; Idiotape; Danniella Dee; Jeslla; Asa Kusumah; Teenage Death Star |

=== 2025: Joyland Sessions ===
Saturday, 29 November 2025

- L'Impératrice
- Bright Eyes
- The Pains of Being Pure at Heart
- Bernadya
- Jirapah
- Galdive
- The Cottons

Sunday, 30 November 2025

- TV Girl
- Soccer Mommy
- Luna Li
- Oddisee & Good Compny
- Ali
- Reality Club
- Thee Marloes

=== 2026: Joyland Sessions ===
Saturday, 28 November 2026

- Slowdive
- Fazerdaze
- Motorama
- JPBS
- Alkateri
- Asken
- Efek Rumah Kaca
- Falaci
- Love as Punishment
- Sunlotus

Sunday, 29 November 2026

- Caribou
- Ichiko Aoba
- Domi and JD Beck
- Chanpan
- CHO CO PA CO CHO CO QUIN QUIN
- Float
- Littlefingers
- Matter Halo
- Mondo Gascaro
- Strange Fruit
