= White Shoes & the Couples Company (album) =

Studio album by White Shoes & the Couples Company
- Released: 2005
- Label: Aksara Records; Minty Fresh (US); Universal Music Indonesia
- Producer: Hanindito Sidharta; Zack Sumendap

White Shoes & the Couples Company chronology
White Shoes & the Couples Company (2005)	Skenario Masa Muda (2007)

Professional ratings
Review scores
Source	Rating
AllMusic	4.5/5 stars

White Shoes & the Couples Company is the debut album from Indonesian band White Shoes & the Couples Company. It was released in 2005 by Indonesian-based Aksara Records. The album made its re-release in 2007 when American label Minty Fresh signed the band to its label. The majority of the songs are in Indonesian, the band's native tongue. Today, this album is only available on American iTunes Store and Apple Music. The album has not been released on other streaming services worldwide.

== Track listing ==
The album contains eleven tracks, and two bonus track. The track that titled Indonesian was noted below with literal English translation for global observer.

No.	Title	Length
1.	"Simple Overture"	2:09
2.	"Nothing to Fear"	4:17
3.	"Tentang Cita" (about love)	4:01
4.	"Windu & Defrina"	4:09
5.	"Runaway Song"	2:58
6.	"Sunday Memory Lane"	4:28
7.	"Brother John"	4:09
8.	"Senandung Maaf" (a hum of forgiveness)	4:12
9.	"Senja" (the twilight)	1:40
10.	"Nothing to Fear" (Woodwind Version)	8:47
11.	"Topstar"	5:31

Bonus Tracks

No.	Title	Length
1.	"Kapiten Dan Gadis Desa" (the captain and a village girl)	3:35
2.	"Sabda Alam" (the utterance of nature)	4:10

== Charts and certifications ==
=== All-time charts ===
Country	Peak position
Indonesia (Top 150 Greatest Albums)	84

== Personnel ==
White Shoes & the Couples Company

- Aprilia Apsari – lead and backing vocals
- Yusmario Farabi – guitars, backing vocals
- Saleh Husein – guitars, backing vocals
- Ricky Surya Virgana – bass guitar, double bass, cello, backing vocals
- Aprimela Prawidyanti – piano, viola, keyboards, backing vocals
- John Navid – drums, vibraphone

Additional credits

- Indra Ameng – Art Direction, clappers, photography, producer
- Aprilia Apsari – Composer, vocals
- Ario Hendarwan – Backing vocals
- Reza Asung – Photography
- Babay – Clappers
- Dimas Bibir – Photography
- Mushowir Bing – Photography
- Andre Blackham – Engineer
- Yusmario Farabi – Composer, acoustic guitar
- Hanindito Sidharta – executive producer
- Zack Sumendap – producer
