= Rayssa Dynta =

Indonesian singer-songwriter and actress (born 1995)

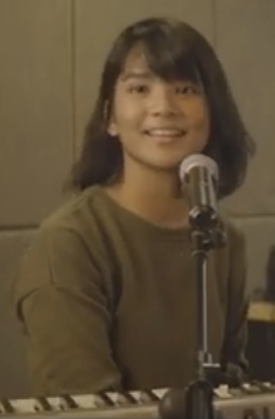
- Performing in 2018
- Born: Rayssa Amaliadynta; 8 February 1995 (age 31); Jakarta, Indonesia
- Other name: Rayssa
- Occupations: Singer; songwriter; actress
- Musical career
- Genres: R&B; electropop
- Instruments: Vocals; piano
- Years active: 2015–present
- Label: Double Deer

Rayssa Amaliadynta (born 8 February 1995), known professionally as Rayssa Dynta, is an Indonesian singer-songwriter and actress. She has released three extended plays Prolog (2018), Allegory: Act I (2020) and Allegory: Act II (2021). As an actress, she rose to prominence for starring in Gossip Girl Indonesia in 2020.

== Early life ==
Dynta started playing piano when she was little and she began writing songs when she wrote the soundtrack for a play in middle school. She graduated from University of Indonesia with a degree in nutritional science in 2017.

== Career ==
In 2014, she started performing as a musician and joined a duo. She appeared as a vocalist on electronic music tracks by Arrio, Artificial and Emir Hermono. In 2017, she released her debut single "Something About Us". In January 2018, she released her debut extended play Prolog. She received four nominations at the Anugerah Musik Indonesia 2018, including Best New Artist and Album of the Year for Prolog. She wrote the theme song for Viu comedy series Halustik, titled "Mischief Mystery". She was featured in rock band .Feast's single "Berita Kehilangan".

In 2019, she released acoustic versions of "Something About Us" and "Spark" on an extended play Reprise. In 2020, she made her acting debut in Gossip Girl Indonesia as Jenny Hakim, the counterpart character of Jenny Humphrey. In August 2020, she released extended play Allegory: Act I with the lead single "Cards". In April 2021, she released extended play Allegory: Act II.

== Discography ==
=== Extended plays ===
Title	Details
Prolog	Released: 26 January 2018; Label: Double Deer
Allegory: Act I	Released: 21 August 2020; Label: Double Deer
Allegory: Act II	Released: 12 February 2021; Label: Double Deer

=== Singles ===
As lead artist

Title	Year	Album
"Something About Us"	2017	Prolog
"Hands"	2018	Prolog
"Under Cover"	2019	Non-album single
"Cards"	2020	Allegory: Act I
"The Unusual"	2021	Allegory: Act II

As featured artist

Title	Year	Album
"Rationale" (Artificial featuring Rayssa)	2015	Solitary State
"Drown Me" (Arrio featuring Rayssa)	2016	In Time
"Call On U" (Emir Hermono featuring Rayssa Dynta)	2017	Non-album single
"Berita Kehilangan" (.Feast featuring Rayssa Dynta)	2018	Beberapa Orang Kehilangan
"Twin Flames" (Neonomora featuring Rayssa Dynta)	2020	Inflammable

=== Songwriting credits ===
Title	Year	Artist(s)	Album
"Mischief Mystery"	2018	Bonita & The Hus Band	Halustik original soundtrack
"Tales of a Man"	2019	Mantra Vutura	Human
"I Don't Want To"	2019	Maria Simorangkir	Non-album single

== Filmography ==
Television performances
Year	Title	Role	Network	Notes
2020	Gossip Girl Indonesia	Jenny Hakim	GoPlay	Main role
