= White Chorus =

Indonesian electropop duo

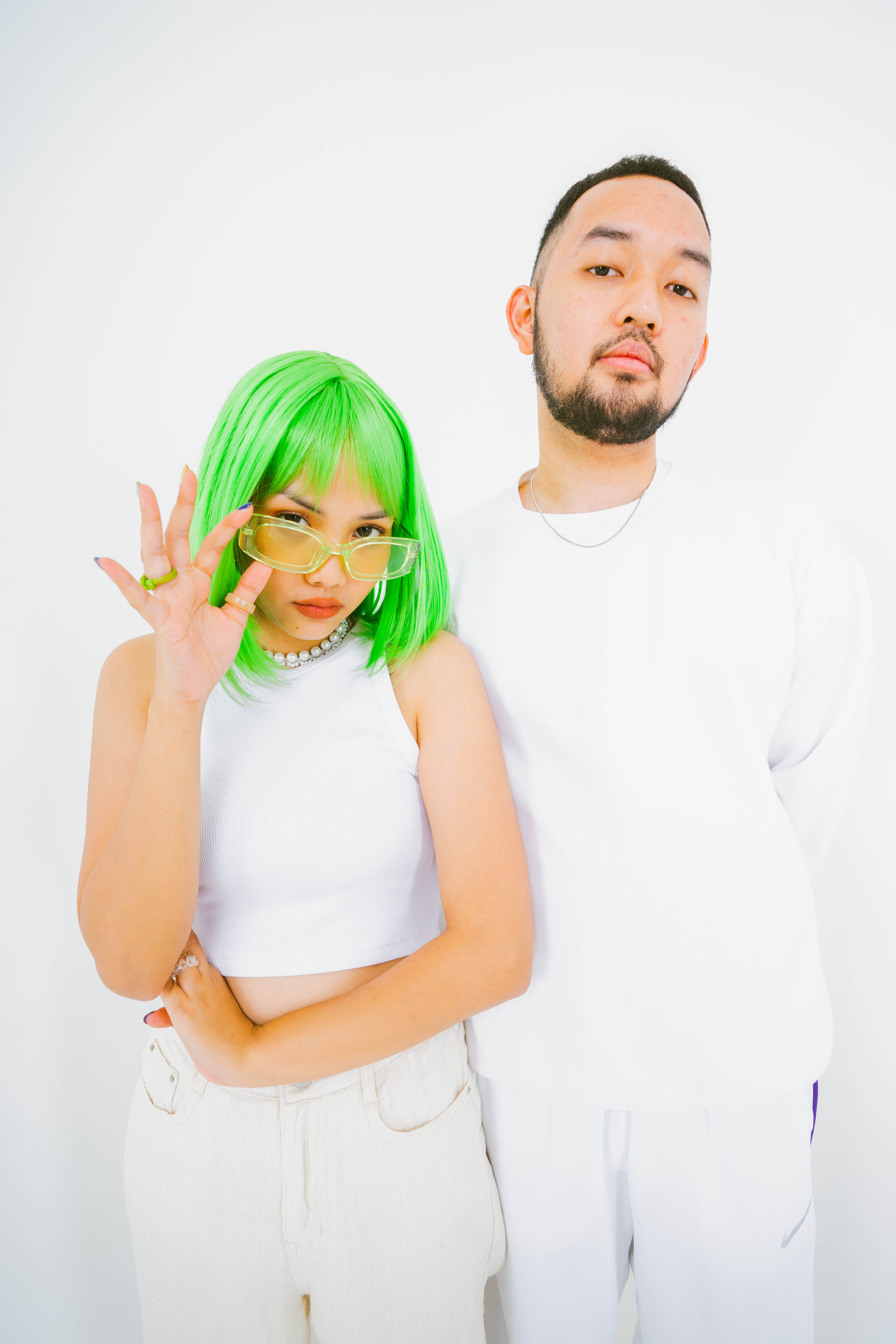

Background information
- Origin: Bandung, West Java, Indonesia
- Genres: Electropop
- Years active: 2016–present
- Labels: Happysad; Microgram
- Members: Clara Friska Adinda; Emir Agung Mahendra

White Chorus is an Indonesian electropop duo, formed in 2019 in Bandung. The duo consists of Clara Friska Adinda and Emir Agung Mahendra. They have released two studio albums, FASTFOOD (2021) and LIMBO (2023) and an extended play do you guys wanna listen to some electro-pop music? (2024).

== Career ==
White Chorus released their debut singles Happysad in 2019, consisting of "Story of Teenage Love" and "Stupid". They released their debut album FASTFOOD on 2 July 2021. The album release was preceded by five singles, "Heatwave", "Telephone Call", "I Shouldn't Bring My Heart Next Time", "Alone Together", and "Disappear". They received a nomination at the 2022 Anugerah Musik Indonesia for Best Electronica Act for "Go Run Away".

In February 2023, they released their lead single for then-upcoming second studio album, "This Feeling". It was followed by the single "Don't Want This To Be Over" in May 2023. They released sophomore studio album, LIMBO, on 2 June 2023. They received a nomination at the 2023 Anugerah Musik Indonesia for Best Electronica Act for "3AM". In August 2023, they released the deluxe version of the album, LIMBO +, featuring a bonus track "used to be used to be used to be" and three demos.

In September 2024, they released an extended play do you guys wanna listen to some electro-pop music?, preceded by the single "Minggu" featuring rapper Dzulfahmi. In October 2024, they released a split extended play Setengah Mati with post-hardcore band Rekah.

== Discography ==
=== Studio albums ===
Title	Details
FASTFOOD	Released: 2 July 2021; Label: HAPPYSAD
LIMBO	Released: 2 June 2023; Label: HAPPYSAD

=== Extended plays ===
Title	Details
do you guys wanna listen to some electro-pop music?	Released: 6 September 2024; Label: HAPPYSAD

=== Collaborative extended plays ===
Title	Details
White Coach in the House (with The Couch Club and BLEU HOUSE)	Released: 12 July 2024; Label: Independent
Setengah Mati (with Rekah)	Released: 18 October 2024; Label: Independent

=== Singles ===
Title	Year	Album
"Story of Teenage Love"/"Stupid"	2019	Happysad
"HEATWAVE"	2020	FASTFOOD
"Telephone Call"	2020	FASTFOOD
"I Shouldn't Bring My Heart Next Time"	2020	FASTFOOD
"Alone Together" (featuring BLEU HOUSE and Untwine)	2021	FASTFOOD
"Disappear"	2021	FASTFOOD
"Vermillion Love (Not A Sunflower Campaign)"	2022	Non-album single
"Throw It All" (with The Couch Club and BLEU HOUSE)	2022	White Couch in the House
"This Feeling"	2023	LIMBO
"Don't Want Us To Be Over"	2023	LIMBO
"Minggu" (featuring Dzulfahmi)	2024	do you guys wanna listen to some electro-pop music?

=== Guest appearances ===
Title	Year	Other artist(s)	Album
"whitechoruuu"	2024	funeruuu	funeruuu dan teman-teman funeruuu
"betty"	2025	Hindia	Doves, '25 on Blank Canvas

=== Remixes ===
Song	Year	Artist	Album	Title
"Cool Me Down"	2024	Assia Keva	2004:RMXS	White Chorus Remix
"[stayhere(4AWHILE)]"	2024	eleventwelfth	DIFFERENT	White Chorus ver.
