= Lomba Sihir =

Indonesian alternative pop band

- Origin: Jakarta, Indonesia
- Genres: Alternative pop
- Years active: 2019–present
- Label: Sun Eater
- Members: Baskara Putra; Natasha Udu; Tristan Juliano; Rayhan Noor; Enrico Octaviano
- Past members: Wisnu Ikhsantama W.

Lomba Sihir (lit. 'Magic Contest') is an Indonesian alternative pop band. It consists of Baskara Putra (vocals), Natasha Udu (vocals), Rayhan Noor (guitar and vocals), Tristan Juliano (keyboards and vocals), and Enrico Octaviano (drums). The band has released two studio albums: Selamat Datang di Ujung Dunia in 2021, and Obrolan Jam 3 Pagi in 2025.

== Career ==
Lomba Sihir started out as Hindia's (Baskara Putra's solo career moniker) live band and also worked on his debut studio album Menari Dengan Bayangan. They made their debut as Hindia's live band at We the Fest 2019. In February 2021, they released their debut single "Hati dan Paru-Paru". Their debut studio album Selamat Datang di Ujung Dunia in March 2021. In December 2021, they released a single "Pesona", as a part of compilation Sounds Cute, Might Delete Later which was initiated by record label Sun Eater.

Lomba Sihir was nominated for Best Band from Asia at the NME Awards 2022. In October 2022, they released a cover of "Less Afraid" for Sajama Cut's tribute album You Can Be Anyone You Want – A Tribute to Sajama Cut. In December 2022, bassist Wisnu Ikhsantama left the band to focus on his personal projects.

In June 2023, they embarked on their first concert tour, Parade Sihir: Tur Perdana Lomba Sihir, in four cities. Rock band Kotak collaborated with Lomba Sihir to release a new version of their single "Beraksi". In December 2023, the band released a single "Selamanya", as a farewell to their ex-manager, Norman "Emon" Permadi. Mixing engineer Stevano and mastering engineer Dimas Pradipta received an Anugerah Musik Indonesia award for Best Sound Engineering Team for their work on the single at the 2024 ceremony.

== Members ==
Current members

- Baskara Putra – vocals
- Natasha Udu – vocals
- Rayhan Noor – guitar, vocals
- Tristan Juliano – keyboards, vocals
- Enrico Octaviano – drums

Past members

- Wisnu Ikhsantama W. – bass guitar (2019–2022)

== Discography ==
=== Studio albums ===
Title	Details
Selamat Datang di Ujung Dunia	Released: 26 March 2021; Label: Sun Eater
Obrolan Jam 3 Pagi	Released: 6 May 2025; Label: Sun Eater

=== Singles ===
Title	Year	Album
"Hati dan Paru-Paru"	2021	Selamat Datang di Ujung Dunia
"Apa Ada Asmara"	2021	Selamat Datang di Ujung Dunia
"Mungkin Takut Perubahan"	2021	Selamat Datang di Ujung Dunia
"Pesona"	2021	Sounds Cute, Might Delete Later
"Less Afraid"	2022	You Can Be Anyone You Want – A Tribute to Sajama Cut
"Ribuan Memori"	2023	Obrolan Jam 3 Pagi
"Beraksi" (with Kotak)	2023	Non-album singles
"Rentang Asmara" (with Katon Bagaskara and KLa Project)	2023	Non-album singles
"Selamanya"	2023	Obrolan Jam 3 Pagi
"Menit Tambahan"	2024	Obrolan Jam 3 Pagi
"Tak Ada Waktu Tepat Untuk Berita Buruk"	2024	Obrolan Jam 3 Pagi
"Sofa"	2025	Obrolan Jam 3 Pagi
"Melompat Lebih Tinggi"	2026	Non-album singles
"Di Seberang"	2026	Setelah Obrolan Jam 3 Pagi
