= Ali (Indonesian band) =

Indonesian funk supergroup

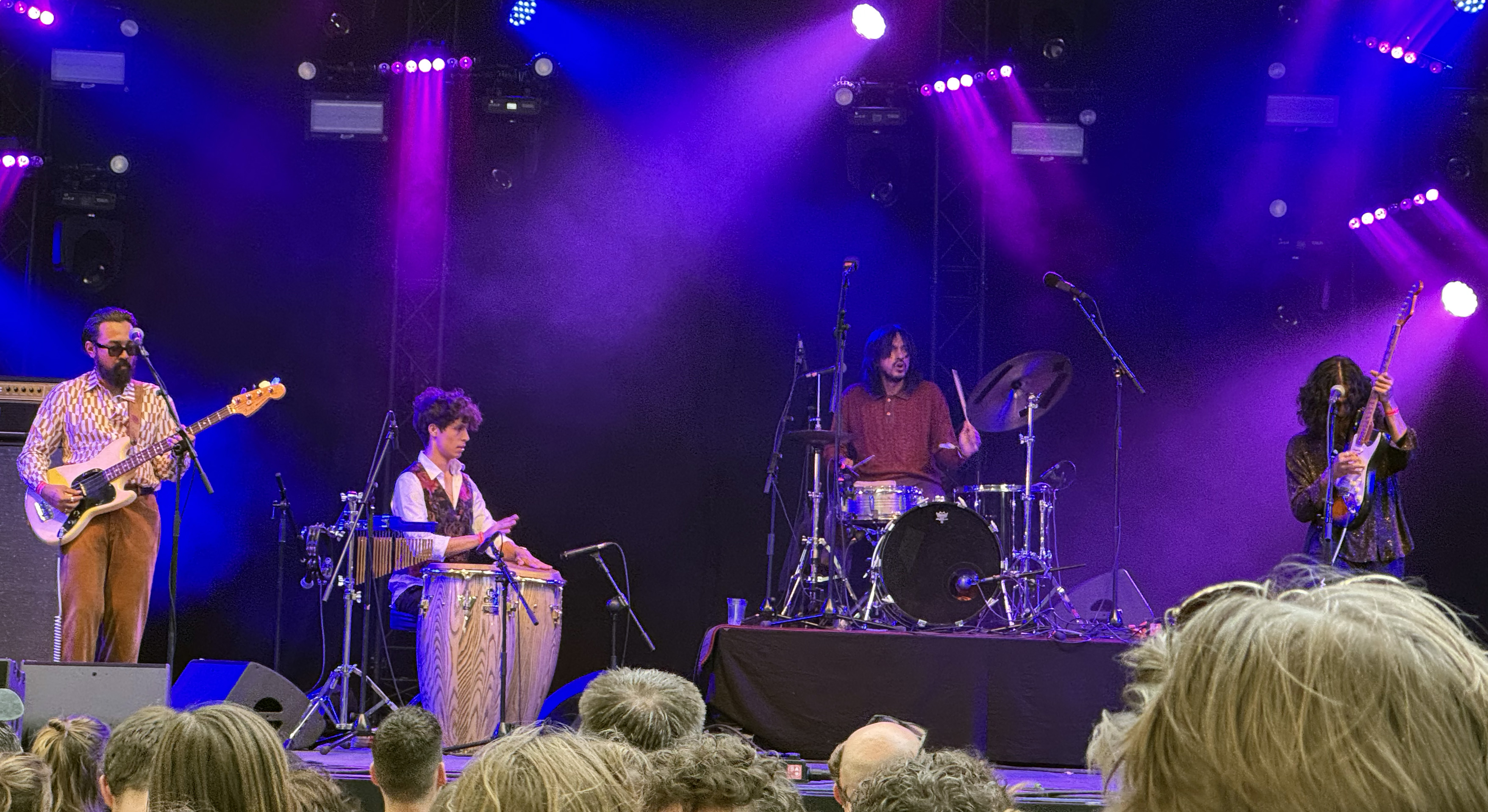
- Ali performing in 2025 at Valkhof Festival in Nijmegen, the Netherlands

Background information
- Origin: Jakarta, Indonesia
- Genres: Funk; disco; psychedelic rock
- Years active: 2021–present
- Label: Anukara
- Members: Arswandaru Cahyo; John Paul Patton; Absar Lebeh
- Past members: Kevin Septanto

Ali is an Indonesian funk supergroup consisting of Mooner additional member Arswandaru Cahyo, Kelompok Penerbang Roket member John Paul Patton and The Sigit member Absar Lebeh, formed in 2021. They joined the wave of "habibi funk" music, incorporating Middle Eastern music elements into funk and disco.

== History ==
Ali was formed in 2021 by additional member of Mooner and illustrator, Arswandaru Cahyo, with Kelompok Penerbang Roket vocalist John Paul Patton and Elephant Kind bassist Kevin Septanto. They released their debut single "Dance, Habibi" the same year.

In January 2023, Septanto was replaced by The Sigit member Absar Lebeh due to his busy schedule with Elephant Kind, and they released the single "Crystal Sand". In February 2023, they embarked on an Australian concert tour.

Their debut album, Malaka was released on 5 May 2023 through Anukara Records. On 10 August 2023, they held the album showcase at the Jakarta Art Building. In 2024, they went on a European and UK tour titled Echoes Tour, including dates and served as an opening act for Australian band Mildlife. Ali went on to play at the 2024 Fuji Rock Festival, becoming the first ever Indonesian band to be featured in the festival's lineup. Ali released their first extended play Patterns on 21 February 2025.

== Band members ==
Current members

- Arswandaru – vocals, bass (2021–present)
- John Paul Patton – vocals, drums (2021–present)
- Absar Lebeh – vocals, guitar (2023–present)

Former members

- Kevin Septanto – vocals, guitar (2021–2023)

Touring musicians

- Ayla Adjie – percussion (2021–present)

== Discography ==
=== Studio albums ===
List of studio albums
Title	Album details
Malaka	Released: 5 May 2023; Label: Anukara

=== Extended plays ===
List of extended plays
Title	Album details
Patterns	Released: 21 February 2025; Label: Independent

=== Singles ===
List of singles, showing year released and album name
Title	Year	Album
"Dance, Habibi"	2021	Malaka
"Downtown Strut"	2022	Non-album single
"Shoreline Transit"	2022	Malaka
"Crystal Sand"	2023	Malaka
"Abyadh Aswad"	2023	Non-album singles
"An Najma" (featuring Adam Halliwell)	2024	Non-album singles
