= .Feast =

Rock music group from Indonesia

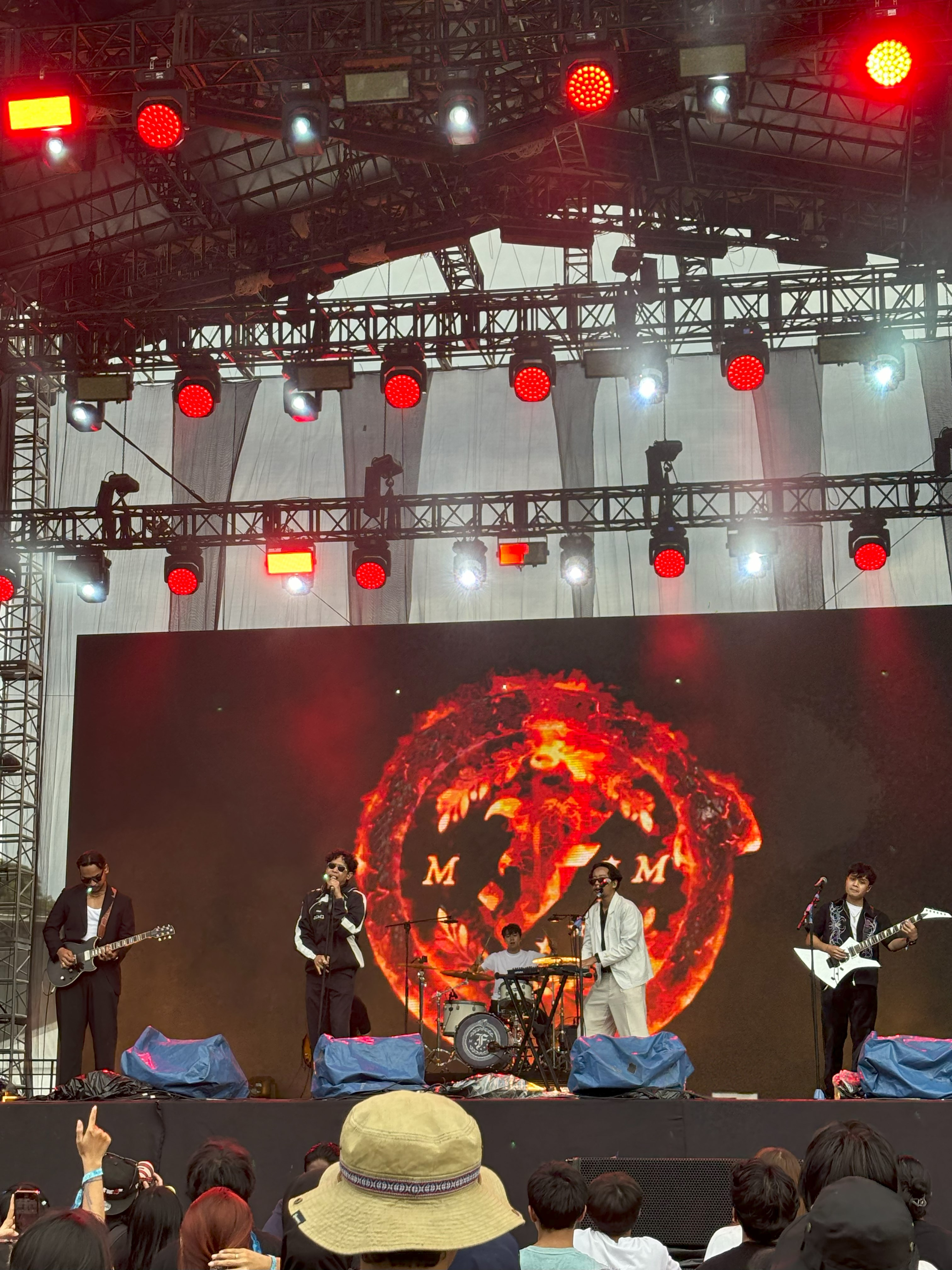
- .Feast playing at Joyland Festival, Jakarta, November 2024

Background information
- Origin: Jakarta, Indonesia
- Genres: Rock; progressive rock; hard rock; indie rock; stoner rock; alternative rock
- Years active: 2013–present
- Labels: Leeds; Karma; Sun Eater
- Members: Baskara Putra; Adnan Satyanugraha; Dicky Renanda; Fadli Fikriawan
- Past members: Adrianus Aristo Haryo

Feast (stylized as .Feast) is a rock band from Indonesia. The current members include Baskara Putra, Adnan S.P, Dicky Renanda P, Jason L.A, and F. Fikriawan W.

== Career ==
.Feast was formed when the members were students of Social and Political Science at the University of Indonesia. In 2014, they released their debut single titled "Camkan" which spotlights Religious Freedom in Indonesia.

After Camkan, they had planned to make another album titled "Convictions", however, the band became inactive. They returned in 2017 with a single, "Wives of ゴジラ/Gojira (We Belong Dead)" featuring Janitra Satriani, and in July 2017, they released "Sectumsempra", inspired by Harry Potter, featuring Yudhis from Rachun Band.

On 18 September 2017, they released an EP titled Multiverses featuring many collaborators including the rapper Ramengvrl, Elephant Kind's vocalist Bam Mastro, Mardial, Oscar Lolang, and Haikal Azizi.

On 13 July 2018, .Feast released a single titled "Peradaban". On 10 August 2018, .Feast released a single featuring Rayssa Dynta titled "Berita Kehilangan", which points out criminalization, rape, rebellion, and terrorism cadres in Indonesia. In late 2018, Baskara Putra started a solo career under the moniker "Hindia".

In 2019, .Feast planned to release another EP called "Membangun dan Menghancurkan" containing a single titled "Dalam Hitungan", which satirizes political polarization, religious bigotry, and Internet addiction in Indonesia, and another single titled "Tarian Penghancur Raya" which spots environmental and cultural threat issues. Also in 2019, .Feast and The Panturas released a single titled "Gelora" for the 2019 SEA Games in Philippines.

== Members ==
Current members

- Baskara Putra – lead vocals, synthesizer (2013–present)
- Adnan Satyanugraha – guitar (2013–present)
- Dicky Renanda – guitar (2013–present)
- Fadli Fikriawan – bass (2013–present)

Past members

- Adrianus Aristo Haryo "Ryo Bodat" – drums (2013–2023)

== Discography ==
=== Studio albums ===
- Multiverses (2017)
- Abdi Lara Insani (2022)
- Membangun & Menghancurkan (2024)

=== Extended plays ===
- Beberapa Orang Memaafkan (2018)
- Uang Muka (2020)

=== Singles ===
Title	Year	Peak position	Album
Title	Year	IDN	Album
"Camkan"	2014	—	Non-album single
"Wives of ゴジラ (We Belong Dead)" (feat. Janitra Satriani)	2017	—	Multiverses
"Sectumsempra" (feat. Yudhis)	2017	—	Multiverses
"Peradaban"	2018	49	Beberapa Orang Memaafkan
"Berita Kehilangan" (featuring Rayssa Dynta)	2018	—	Beberapa Orang Memaafkan
"Kami Belum Tentu"	2018	—	Beberapa Orang Memaafkan
"Dalam Hitungan"	2019	—	Non-album singles
"Tarian Penghancur Raya"	2019	28	Non-album singles
"Gelora" (with The Panturas)	2019	—	Non-album singles
"Luar Jaringan"	2020	—	Non-album singles
"Di Padang Lumpuh"	2020	—	Non-album singles
"Komodifikasi"	2020	—	Uang Muka
"Maju"	2021	—	Non-album single
"Gugatan Raykat Semesta"	2022	—	Abdi Lara Insani
"Tak Ada Wifi Di Alam Baka" (with Koil (band))	2023	—	Non-album single
"Konsekuens"	2024	—	Membangun & Menghancurkan
"Politrik"	2024	—	Membangun & Menghancurkan
"Nina"	2024	—	Membangun & Menghancurkan

== Accolades ==
Year	Awards	Category	Recipient	Results	Ref.
2019	Anugerah Musik Indonesia	Duo/Grup/Grup Vokal/Kolaborasi Rock Terbaik	"Kami Belum Tentu"	Nominated	
2019	Anugerah Musik Indonesia	Duo/Grup/Grup Vokal/Kolaborasi Alternatif Terbaik	"Berita Kehilangan" (featuring Rayssa Dynta)	Nominated	
2019	LINE Indonesia Awards	Most Favorite Music Group	Feast	Nominated	
2020	Anugerah Musik Indonesia	Duo/Grup/Grup Vokal/Kolaborasi Alternatif Terbaik	"Tarian Penghancur Raya"	Nominated	
2021	JOOX Indonesian Music Awards	Indonesian Group/Duo/Band of the Year	Feast	Nominated	
2021	Anugerah Musik Indonesia	Duo/Grup/Grup Vokal/Kolaborasi Rock Terbaik	"Komodifikasi"	Nominated	
2022	Anugerah Musik Indonesia	Duo/Grup/Grup Vokal/Kolaborasi Rock Terbaik	"Gugatan Rakyat Semesta"	Nominated	
2022	Anugerah Musik Indonesia	Album Rock Terbaik	"Abdi Lara Insani"	Won	
2024	Anugerah Musik Indonesia	Duo/Grup/Grup Vokal/Kolaborasi Rock Terbaik	"Konsekuens"	Won	
2024	Anugerah Musik Indonesia	Video Musik Terbaik	"Konsekuens"	Nominated	
2025	Anugerah Musik Indonesia	Album Terbaik-Terbaik	"Membangun & Menghancurkan"	Nominated	
2025	Anugerah Musik Indonesia	Artis Solo/Grup/Kolaborasi Rock Terbaik	"Tarot"	Nominated	
2025	Anugerah Musik Indonesia	Duo/Group/Band of the Year	.Feast	Nominated	
2025	Anugerah Musik Indonesia	Alternative Song of the Year	"Nina"	Nominated	
2025	Anugerah Musik Indonesia	Album Rock Terbaik	"Membangun & Menghancurkan"	Won	
2025	Anugerah Musik Indonesia	Video Musik Terbaik	"Arteri" (Dwi Agung Pambudi & Dhiwangkara Seta)	Nominated	
