= Midnight Fusic =

Malaysian rock band

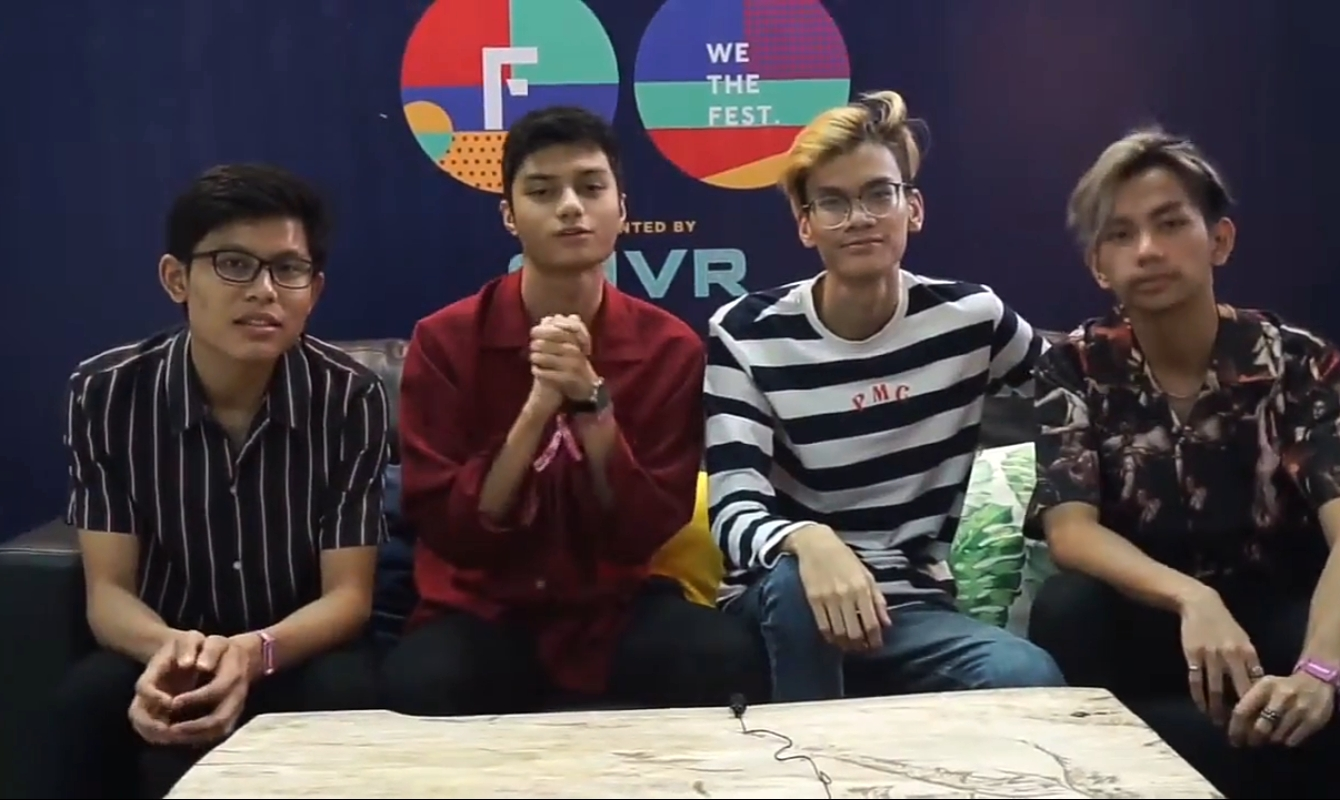
- Midnight Fusic in November 2019

Background information
- Origin: Petaling Jaya, Selangor, Malaysia
- Genres: Alternative rock; indie rock
- Years active: 2013–present
- Labels: Sony Music Malaysia (2017-2021); TTA (2022-2024)
- Members: Arif Kamarudin; Adrian Danial; Firdaus Azmi; Muaz Rabbani

Midnight Fusic are a Malaysian rock band formed in Petaling Jaya, Selangor in 2013. The band consists of Arif Kamarudin (vocals, guitar), Adrian Danial (vocals, guitar), Firdaus Azmi (bass) and Muaz Rabbani (drums). The band best-known for their singles, "Heart of May" and "Lovesick", which receives positive reviews from music critics. Their debut EP, When Love Was Around was released on 20 July 2018. The band's name was inspired by their love for football and music.

== History ==
The band was formed in 2013 and started out as a duo consists of Arif Kamarudin and Adrian Danial. During this period, they covered songs by other artists in YouTube. The duo was later expanded as a group with the inclusion of Firdaus Azmi and Muaz Rabbani.

They were signed to Sony Music Malaysia in November 2016 after the label was interested with musical works. Their debut single, "Heart of May" was launched in September 2017, 4 years after their establishment.

== Discography ==
=== EP ===
Title	EP details
When Love Was Around	Released: July 2018; Label: Sony Music Malaysia; Format(s): CD, vinyl, digital download
Caramel Cream	Released: September 2019; Label: Sony Music Malaysia; Format(s): CD, digital download
Modus Operandi	Released: May 2025; Label: -; Format(s): digital download

=== Studio albums ===
Title	Album details
Midnight Fusic	Released: February 2021; Label: Sony Music Malaysia; Format(s): CD, digital download
