= Aksara Records =

- Founded: 2004; 21 years ago 2022; 3 years ago (relaunch)
- Founder: Hanindhito Siddharta; David Tarigan
- Defunct: 2009; 16 years ago (original)
- Status: Active
- Genre: Pop; rock; indie pop; electronica
- Country of origin: Indonesia
- Location: Jakarta
- Official website: http://www.aksararecords.com/

Aksara Records was a Jakarta-based independent record label concentrated on indie music, founded in 2004 by Hanindhito Siddharta and David Tarigan. The variety of music carried by artists under the Aksara Records label is centered on music such as genres that are rarely known in Indonesia, such as pop, rock, indie pop, and electronica. Its logo was a cartooned crow holding a beamed notes in its mouth. The label name came from Indonesian word "aksara" which in English means "alphabet".

In early 2009, a few days after Aksara Records released Efek Rumah Kaca's second album Kamar Gelap, Aksara Records experienced financial problems until finally, the company stopped operating in December 2009. All the remaining masters in the label were given to the artists. Aksara Records is one of the largest independent music label in Indonesia.

One of the co-owners of Aksara Records, opened another independent label called Raksasa Records.

== Background ==
According to The Jakarta Post after an interview with David Tarigan, Aksara Records started with its efforts to document the development of indie music in Jakarta. From here this record label developed so that now it has established relationships with many local and foreign artists. Aksara Records' first release was the compilation album JKT: SKRG in 2004 which featured 12 indie music groups from Jakarta, such as Sore, C'mon Lennon, The Upstairs. The album eventually began distribution in Seattle where grunge music was very popular, and was also broadcast on several university radio stations there. The album then began to penetrate indie record stores in Canada and the United Kingdom, where Aksara Records has established its own indie music distribution network.

The company's first achievement came when Tarigan was asked by Nia Dinata, producer of the film Janji Joni to compose the theme song for the teen comedy movie. With the publicity that followed the film Janji Joni, the album eventually became a smash hit. According to Tarigan, the success of the theme song Janji Joni is also an indication that materially, independent record labels like Aksara can compete with bigger record labels.

== Artists ==
- The Adams
- Ardhito Pramono
- Bilal Indrajaya
- The Brandals
- Efek Rumah Kaca
- Goodnight Electric
- Meda Kawu
- Sore
- Stereomantic
- Superglad
- Tika & The Dissident
- Velo Band
- VOX
- White Shoes & The Couples Company

== See also ==
- List of record labels
