= The Panturas =

Indonesian surf rock band

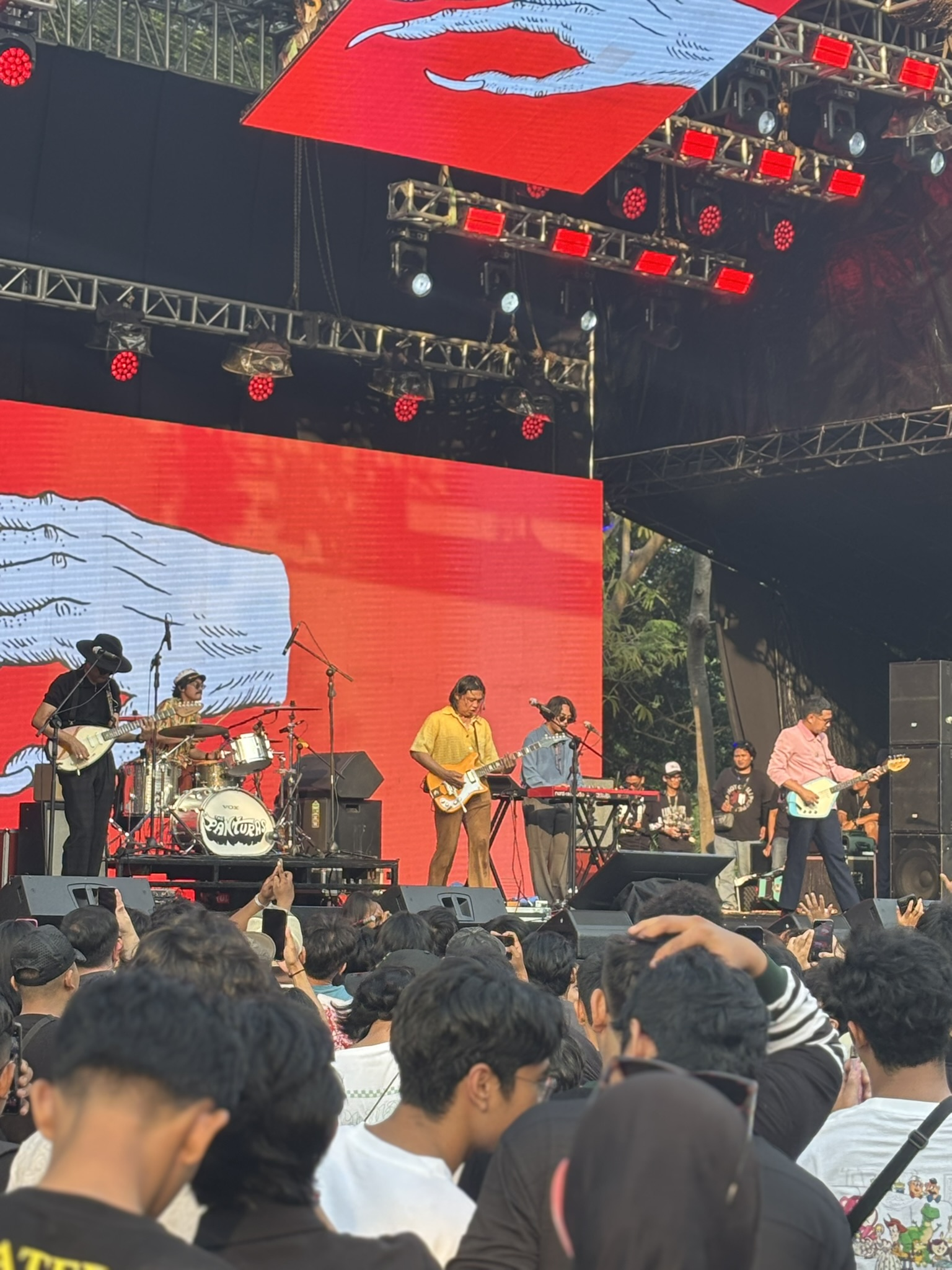
- The Panturas at The Sounds Project 8, August 2025

Background information
- Origin: Bandung, West Java, Indonesia
- Genre: Surf rock
- Years active: 2016–present
- Labels: Los Panturas; La Munai
- Members: Abyan Nabilio; Surya Fikri; Bagus Patria; Rizal Taufikurrohman

The Panturas is an Indonesian surf rock band. The group consists of Abyan Nabilio, Surya Fikri, Bagus Patria, and Rizal Taufikurrohman. They released two studio albums, Mabuk Laut (2018) and Ombak Banyu Asmara (2021), and an extended play Galura Tropikalia (2024).

== Career ==
The group was formed in 2016 by Surya "Kuya" Fikri, Rizal "Ijal" Taufik and Cecep. Then, Cecep left and Abyan "Acin" Nabilio and Bagus Patria joined the group. All members met during their studies at the Faculty of Communication Sciences, Padjadjaran University. The name of the group is a play on instrumental band The Ventures, which also served as their musical inspiration. Pantura itself, Pantai Utara, is a nickname of a major road along the north coast of Java, Indonesian National Route 1.

In July 2016, they released their debut single "Fisherman's Slut". In February 2018, their debut studio album Mabuk Kota was released through independent record label La Munai Records. The album addresses the maritime issues faced by Indonesian fishermen. In 2019, the group collaborated with rock band .Feast to release "Gelora" as a Gojek's promotional anthem for the 2019 SEA Games. The group released a single "Putra Petir" as a tribute to the Joko Anwar's 2019 superhero film Gundala. They released a cover of Mocca's "You and Me Against the World" for tribute album You and Me Against the World: A Tribute to Mocca.

In 2020, they released the lead single of their then-upcoming sophomore studio album, "Balada Semburan Naga" which featured the vocalist of rock band The Kuda, Adipati. In 2021, they released their sophomore album Ombak Banyu Asmara. They received nominations for Best Alternative Duo or Group or Collaboration for "Tafsir Mistik" at the 2021 Anugerah Musik Indonesia and "All I Want" at the 2022 ceremony.

In October 2024, they released their first track in Sundanese language, "Lasut Nyanggut". They released an extended play in Sundanese, titled Galura Tropikalia, produced by Ricky Virgana, the bassist of White Shoes & the Couples Company. Musically, the group blends surf rock, Sundanese traditional music, and disco-pop on the extended play. In February 2025, it was announced that the band will perform at the year's Fuji Rock Festival.

== Members ==
- Abyan Nabilio – vocals, guitar
- Rizal Taufikurrohman – guitar
- Bagus Patria – bass
- Surya Fikri – drums

== Discography ==
=== Studio albums ===
Title	Details
Mabuk Laut	Released: 19 February 2018; Label: La Munai
Ombak Banyu Asmara	Released: 10 September 2021; Label: La Munai

=== Extended plays ===
Title	Details
Galura Tropikalia	Released: 22 November 2024; Label: Los Panturas

=== Singles ===
Title	Year	Album
"Fisherman's Slut"	2016	Mabuk Laut
"Gurita Kota"	2018	Mabuk Laut
"Queen of the South"	2018	Non-album singles
"Gelora" (with .Feast)	2019	Non-album singles
"Putra Petir"	2019	Non-album singles
"Balada Semburan Naga" (featuring Adipati "The Kuda")	2020	Ombak Banyu Asmara
"Tafsir Mistik"	2021	Ombak Banyu Asmara
"Lasut Nyanggut"	2024	Galura Tropikalia
"Jimat" (featuring Doel Sumbang)	2024	Galura Tropikalia

=== Guest appearances ===
Title	Year	Other artist(s)	Album
"You and Me Against the World"	2019	—N/a	You and Me Against the World: A Tribute to Mocca
"Di Bangku Taman"	2023	Pure Saturday	Our Sincere Desire
