= Koil (band) =

Rock music group from Bandung, Indonesia

- Origin: Bandung, West Java, Indonesia
- Genres: Rock, Industrial rock, Industrial metal, Goth Metal
- Years active: 1993–present
- Labels: Project Q, Apocalypse, Alfa, Nagaswara
- Members: J. A. Verdiantoro; Donnijantoro; Leon Ray Legoh; Adam Vladvamp
- Past members: Ibrahim Nasution
- Website: http://www.koil.tv/

Koil is an Indonesian rock band, formed in Bandung, West Java in 1993 by singer J.A Verdiantoro (Otong), his brother, guitarist Donnijantoro (Doni), and their friends bassist/guitarist Ibrahim Nasution (Imo) and drummer Leon Ray Legoh (Leon).

== History ==
=== Early years ===
Koil released their first recorded material, a mini album called Demo From Nowhere, in 1994. The released was limited due for financial reasons. Two years later, major label Project Q offered the band a contract for a studio album, which was released in September 1996. Most of the songs on the album were taken from Demo From Nowhere.

In 1997, Koil's partnership with Project Q ended, and the band released a single called "Kesepian Ini Abadi" ("This Loneliness stays immortal") on their own label, Apocalypse Records, founded by Otong and a close friend of the band, Adam Vladvamp of the band Kubik.

Around this time, the band made changes to their stage concept and image, adopting customised leather outfits, black colours, metal accessories, high boots and other items typical of an industrial goth look.

After releasing the single, the band started work on their next album, and also became involved in side projects with other bands from their hometown. They also contributed songs to some compilation albums such as Best Alternative Indonesia, Ticket to Ride, and Viking – Persib.

=== Megaloblast ===
In February 2001, the band released their second album, Megaloblast, and produced a video for the song "Mendekati Surga" ("Approaching Heaven") to promote the album.

In October 2003 Alfa Records offered to re-release the album nationwide, and the album was re-released across Indonesia in December 2003. To promote the album, the band produced two more videos, "Kita dapat Diselamatkan" ("We Can Be Saved") and "Dosa Ini Tak Akan Berhenti" ("This Sin Will Not Stop").

In 2005, the band released two singles, "Hiburan Ringan Part I" ("Light Entertainment Part I") and "Hiburan Ringan Part II" ("Light Entertainment Part II"), which were included on a soundtrack album for the horror movie 12:00 AM. A video was made for the song "Hiburan Ringan Part II". The band performed on some music festivals and appeared on TV to promote their new single.

=== Blacklight Shines On ===
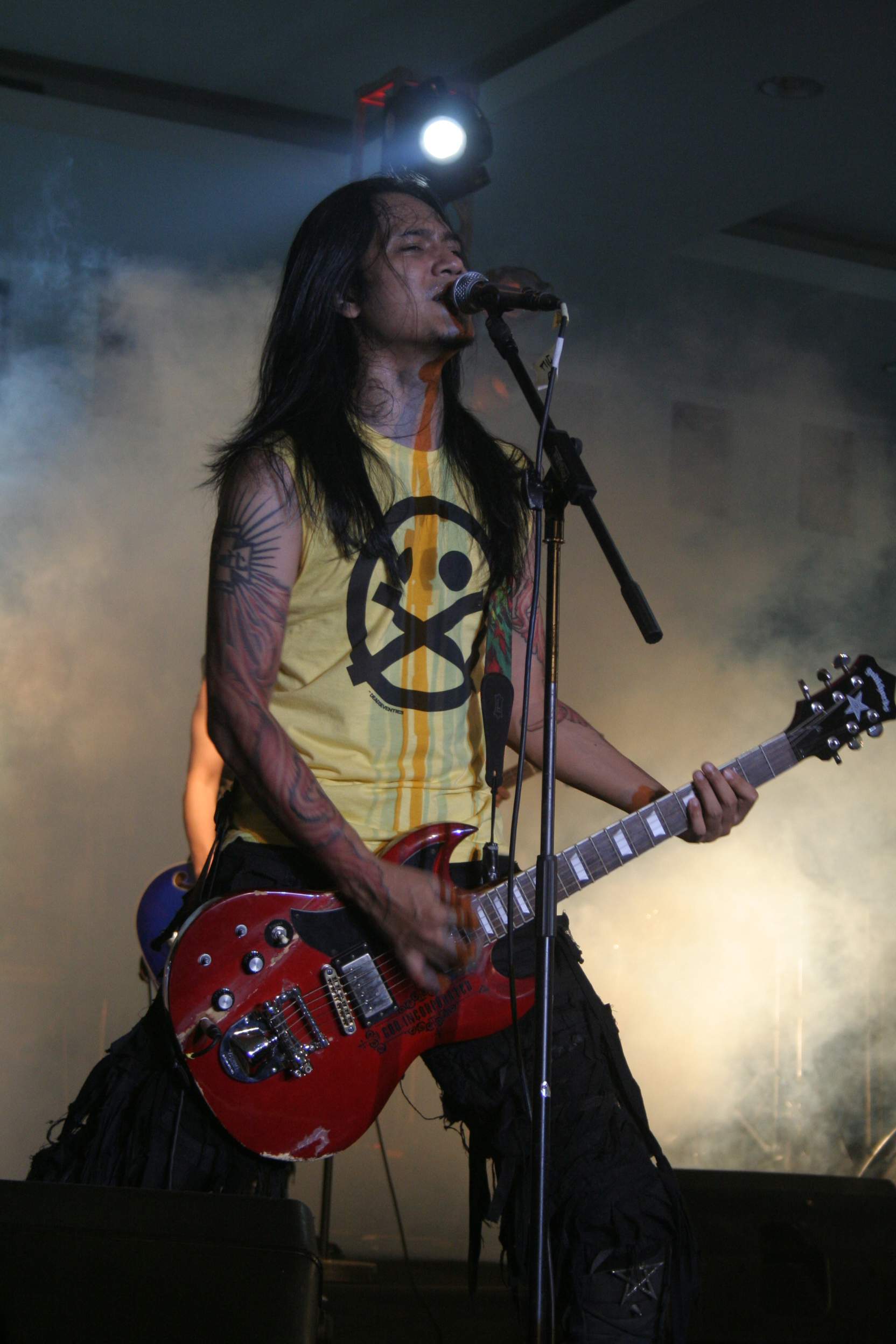
Otong at Kickfest 2009 Yogyakarta

Adam Vladvamp joined the band as a bassist in 2007. After almost a year in the studio, Koil released their third album, Blacklight Shines On, with nine songs. The band made a few copies of the album and gave it away free to fans, also releasing it through the internet. A video was made for the song "Semoga Kau Sembuh Part II" ("Hopefully You Get Better Part II"). Directed by Indonesian film director Rizal Mantovani, the video features the band performing on a stage surrounded by fans. Horror situations gradually start to appear in video as it becomes the soundtrack of a horror movie entitled Kuntilanak. The band toured and performed in some cities in Java and Bali during 2007–09.

In 2009, guitarist Ibrahim Nasution left the band, for undisclosed reasons. The band did not replace him and returned to being a four-piece band.

Blacklight Shines On was re-released by major label Nagaswara Records in March 2010, with two new songs and one remixed track added. The cover artwork of the album was also redesigned, and the title shortened to Blacklight.

== Discography ==
=== Studio albums ===
- Koil (1996)
- Megaloblast (2001)
- Blacklight Shines On (2007)
- Blacklight (repackaged) (2010)

=== Mini albums ===
- Demo From Nowhere (1994)
- Caligula (2001)

=== Singles ===
- Dengekeun Aing, From "Indonesia Best Alternative" compilation (1997)
- Kesepian Ini Abadi (1999)
- Dosa, From "Ticket To Ride" compilation (2000)
- Untuk Kemenangan Kami, From "Viking - Persib" compilation (2002)
- Hiburan Ringan Part I and Hiburan Ringan Part II, From "12:00 AM" movie soundtrack (2005)
- Breath With Me, From Compilation: Rolling Stone Rare & Raw (2006)
- Kenyataan Dalam Dunia Fantasi, From The Best Of Republik Cinta Compilation Album feat Ahmad Dani (2008)
- Suaramu Merdu (2008)
- Likantropi Diri, From "Takut" Movie Soundtrack feat Shanty (2008)
- Aku Rindu (2010)

== See also ==
- List of Indonesian rock bands
