= Hindia (singer) =

Indonesian singer, songwriter, record producer, composer and lecturer (born 1994)

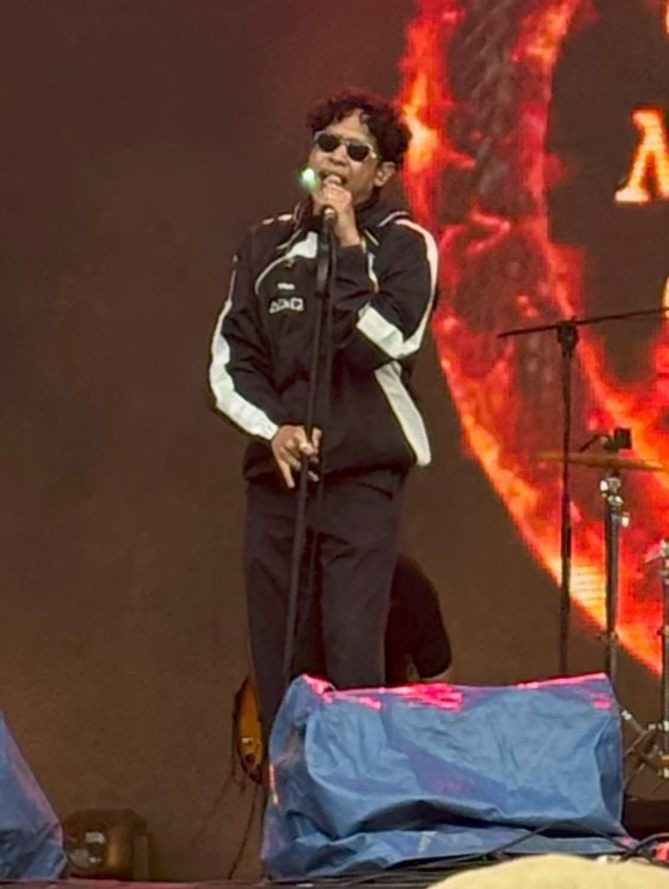
- Hindia performing with .Feast at Joyland Festival, November 2024.
- Born: Daniel Baskara Putra; 22 February 1994 (age 32); Jakarta, Indonesia
- Education: University of Indonesia
- Occupations: Singer; songwriter; record producer; composer; lecturer
- Years active: 2012–present
- Musical career
- Genres: Pop , Rock
- Instrument: Vocals
- Label: Sun Eater
- Member of: .Feast; Lomba Sihir

Daniel Baskara Putra (born 22 February 1994), known professionally as Hindia, is an Indonesian singer, songwriter, record producer, composer and lecturer. He rose to prominence as the vocalist of .Feast, which he formed with four other members in 2012. Putra started a solo career under the moniker Hindia in 2018 and later formed Lomba Sihir with his live band members in 2021.

As a solo artist, he has released two studio albums, Menari dengan Bayangan (2019) and Lagipula Hidup Akan Berakhir (2023), as well as a mixtape: Doves, '25 on Blank Canvas (2025).

== Early life ==
Daniel Baskara Putra was born on 22 February 1994 in Jakarta, Indonesia, as the youngest child and son of the three children and was raised there. His father was from Semarang but born in Salatiga, while her mother was born in Rote Island and lived in Alor Island and Kupang before settled in Jakarta. They met in Jakarta and later lived in South Tangerang. He had a brother, Adrian Mahendra Putra, a bassist who became a tour member who often accompanied him on the .Feast and Hindia tours. Putra began his education by attending Tunas Harapan Kindergarten in South Tangerang and continued his elementary school education at SD Don Bosco in Jakarta. He then continued his junior high school education at SMP Pangudi Luhur in Jakarta and continued his senior high school education at SMA Pangudi Luhur in Jakarta. While in high school, Putra and his friends formed a band that successfully performed at art shows and received pay, even though they only sang other people's songs. This continued into college, where he unexpectedly persevered and became successful to this day. Putra not only plays guitar, but also sings. Seeing his efforts and achievements, his parents and older brothers were at the forefront of his pride. Besides music, Putra is also skilled at design. His ultimate goal after graduating from high school was to major in Visual Design at the Bandung Institute of Technology. Putra was also offered several scholarships abroad in the field of fine arts. However, he ultimately chose the University of Indonesia (UI), specializing in advertising, which also includes visual design. After graduating from SMA Pangudi Luhur, Putra continued his education at Faculty of Social and Political Sciences (FISIP UI) at UI majoring in communication sciences. During his time at UI, he often participated in lecturers' projects outside the campus and also created small agencies outside UI, until he became a bit fed up with pursuing that field.

== Career ==
After graduating from University of Indonesia (UI) with a degree in communication sciences, Putra made a work plan for himself for the next six months, where if he did not get a job in those three fields, then he would try to pursue a career in music for a year and if that failed, then he would return to work at an agency. However, one of his goals was fulfilled when he was accepted to work at the British Council in the Arts and Culture Division.

Putra's family played a big role in his life, including introducing him to music. He admitted that he was initially reluctant to pursue music. "Since I was little, I was offered to study music and never wanted to. Because I saw my two older siblings being so stressed by music. But my older brother was more stressed by piano because he liked guitar," Putra said. When his interest in music began to grow, he was often teased by his older brother, who had already entered the music world. "Every time I wanted to learn by myself at home, strumming the guitar, being out of tune, and being teased, what is that? So, I learned by paying off the mortgage in installments like a 25-year mortgage. Ha-ha-ha," he said.

In 2012, Putra formed a rock band .Feast with four other members. They released their debut studio album Multiverses in 2017, followed by the extended play Beberapa Orang Memaafkan a year later, and became famous for their song Peradaban. After more than a year, he decided to move and join Double Deer, an independent record label, at the invitation of Kimo Rizky and Kukuh Rizal Arfianto. Along the way, .Feast suddenly boomed. Putra felt he did not have enough time to finish his work and grow .Feast. He dared to leave together with Arfianto. This ultimately led to the founding of Sun Eater, a record label and music startup that not only houses .Feast but also a number of other young musicians.

In 2018, Putra made his debut as a solo artist under the moniker Hindia with the single "No One Will Find Me" as a part of the compilation album Bertamu, initiated by Double Deer Records. One by one, the plans he had jotted down for himself came true, including a solo project. By choosing Hindia as his stage name, Putra is said to be able to voice the concerns and anxieties of many young people today regarding life. This contrasts with .Feast, which satirically addresses socio-political issues in Indonesia. He also released a Christmas-themed compilation extended play, Tidak Ada Salju Di Sini, in December 2018 with Petra Sihombing, Enrico Octaviano, Rubina, and Krautmilk.

On 22 March 2019, he released his debut single Evaluasi, which become popular in local music, followed by Secukupnya on 3 May 2019. In June 2019, Putra released two more singles titled Tinggalkan di Sana on 4 June and Jam Makan Siang on 14 June. He released his debut studio album Menari dengan Bayangan. Through his debut album, Putra feels like he's chipping away at the walls of his life, allowing others to see a part of his story. He even touches on the razor blade scar he accidentally got while playing in his older brother's room at the age of two. Putra gathered the names of his puppy love, his uncertainty about his life's purpose, his ups and downs, his anxiety disorder and even a glimpse of his mother's story about him into one album. Near the final track, there's even a message from Putra's best friend that's quite poignant. For him, this debut album is a form of therapy for himself. Moved by Mantra Mantra by Kunto Aji, Putra opens up and tells his story through Hindia. He was nominated for Best New Artist and Best Alternative Solo Artist at the 2019 Anugerah Musik Indonesia. Putra made a cameo appearance in Angga Dwimas Sasongko's One Day We'll Talk About Today and his single Secukupnya was featured as its official soundtrack. In 2020, he won his first Anugerah Musik Indonesia award for Best Alternative Solo Artist for "Rumah ke Rumah".

In 2021, Putra and his live band members formed a pop band Lomba Sihir and released their debut single "Hati dan Paru-Paru". They released their debut album Selamat Datang di Ujung Dunia in March 2021. They were nominated for the Best Band from Asia at the NME Awards 2022.

In 2023, he released his sophomore studio double album Lagipula Hidup Akan Berakhir. The album was released in two parts, the first on 7 July and the second two weeks later. This latest album has succeeded in stealing the attention of the music world with several songs that have become the trending topic, such as Janji Palsu, Masalah Masa Depan and Cincin. Putra then embarked on a concert tour Lagipula Hidup Akan Berakhir Album Concert in four cities. The tour concluded in Jakarta on 30 September 2023 at the Jakarta International Velodrome.

In July 2024, he released a collaborative single "Right Where You Left Me" with American singer eaJ. Putra was nominated for six Anugerah Musik Indonesia awards at the 2024 ceremony, including Album of the Year. He won for Best Alternative Album and Best Alternative Solo Artist.

In January 2025, Putra collaborated with Danilla to release a cover of Melly Goeslaw and Ari Lasso's 1999 single "Jika". He announced the release of a surprise mixtape, Doves, '25 on Black Canvas on 24 February 2025. The mixtape won Best Alternative Album and Best of the Best Album awards in the 2025 Anugerah Musik Indonesia.

== Public image ==
Putra is considered a Satanist and Illuminati figure. While singing Matahari Tenggelam, he asked the audience to cover their eyes with cloths they had brought. They were then asked to open their eyes midway through the performance. Furthermore, the presence of a statue also drew attention, accused of being a symbol of a cult. This incident sparked debate among netizens. Many accused Putra of being a figure and of involvement with Satanism and the Illuminati based on this incident. He became one of the musicians who dared to express protests at a time when many musicians did not dare to express their political stance and tended to decide to play it safe and maintain their existence and minimize problems since the COVID-19 pandemic ended. Putra has become a symbol of the freedom of young people to express their opinions, making the music stage a channel for making changes, especially for the younger generation who are the demographic that enjoys his work.

== Political views and activism ==
As a musician with a mass base, Putra often conveys aspirations in his stage performances, starting from the issue of Palestinian genocide allegations, Dark Indonesia to the campaign to reject the revision of the TNI Law, where he always consistently expresses his opinions. Besides condemning political crimes through his works, Putra also often expresses his opinions through visuals and the power of social media. He admits that growing up in the right educational environment was very helpful. His work with .Feast and the various opinions he voices are inseparable from his background. "I believe nurture is stronger than nature. The faculty of social and political sciences helped me develop the mindset I have now, and the writing I do now," Putra said. He frequently voices his comments on current events through social media. Putra's songs also express his grievances about the current situation in Indonesia. "I learned to write in college. In high school, I loved reading because there weren't many ideas at that time," he said. From reading comics, Putra suddenly understood various terms. "I even got into what judicial review was. I learned a lot from that," he said. Putra then began combining it with his hobby of writing during college. His concern for socio-political issues emerged here. "If you ask me, I have a kind of compartment in my head. Oh, there are musicians who are activists and there are friends who are activists. Well, .Feast's friends are activists. So, whatever we can help, we definitely help," Putra explained. He also often speaks out for better adoption, which he even wrote about in his final college assignment.

== Personal life ==
=== Religion ===
Putra is a Protestant.

=== Health ===
In an interview in the early of 2019, Putra said that he struggled with a mental breakdowns during the success of .Feast which changed his life. "My private space has been eroded. They say it's a consequence of my work, but that argument isn't fair either. Because you don't know either but you're ignoring it. You'd be lying if you said you didn't think about it. Now I'm used to it. Just learn to live with it," he said. As a result, Putra founded Bagikata, an information-sharing app that also focuses on mental health. He credits family and close friends as his primary support system, helping him recover and remain accepted. "I'm grateful to have the privilege of parents and close friends who are supportive and aware of things like this. Yet, there are still parents who see the first sign of mental illness as just laziness, not something serious," he said.

== Discography ==
=== Studio albums ===
| Title | Details |
|---|---|
| Menari Dengan Bayangan | Released: 29 November 2019; Label: Sun Eater |
| Lagipula Hidup Akan Berakhir | Released: 21 July 2023; Label: Sun Eater |

=== Extended plays ===
| Title | Details |
|---|---|
| Tidak Ada Salju Di Sini (with Petra Sihombing, Enrico Octaviano, Krautmilk, and Rubina) | Released: 25 December 2018; Label: Sun Eater |

=== Mixtapes ===
| Title | Details |
|---|---|
| Doves, '25 on Blank Canvas | Released: 24 February 2025; Label: Sun Eater, Sepuluh Dua Empat |

=== Singles ===
==== As lead artist ====
| Title | Year | Album |
|---|---|---|
| "Evaluasi" | 2019 | Menari Dengan Bayangan |
| "Secukupnya" | 2019 | Menari Dengan Bayangan |
| "Tinggalkan Di Sana" | 2019 | Non-album single |
| "Jam Makan Siang" (featuring Matter Mos) | 2019 | Menari Dengan Bayangan |
| "Belum Tidur" (featuring Sal Priadi) | 2019 | Menari Dengan Bayangan |
| "Membasuh" (featuring Rara Sekar) | 2019 | Menari Dengan Bayangan |
| "Dehidrasi" (featuring Petra Sihombing) | 2019 | Menari Dengan Bayangan |
| "Ramai Sepi Bersama" | 2020 | Non-album singles |
| "Si Lemah" (with RAN) | 2020 | Non-album singles |
| "Percakapan, Pt. 1" (with Mantra Vutura) | 2020 | Non-album singles |
| "Setengah Tahun Ini" | 2020 | Non-album singles |
| "Tidak Ada Salju di Sini, Pt. 7" (with Dipha Barus) | 2021 | Non-album singles |
| "Tentang Masa Depan / Satu Dua Langkah" (with tradeto) | 2021 | Kelahiran Kala Nanti |
| "Hari Yang Baik untuk Berbohong" (with RAYHAN NOOR) | 2021 | Sounds Cute, Might Delete Later, Vol. 1 |
| "Aku Rasa Kita Selamanya" | 2022 | Non-album single |
| "Vaya Con Dios" (with Pee Wee Gaskins) | 2022 | Get Well Soon |
| "Janji Palsu" | 2023 | Lagipula Hidup Akan Berakhir |
| "Masalah Masa Depan" | 2023 | Lagipula Hidup Akan Berakhir |
| "Perkara Tubuh" | 2023 | Lagipula Hidup Akan Berakhir |
| "Kami Khawatir, Kawan" | 2023 | Lagipula Hidup Akan Berakhir |
| "Cincin" | 2023 | Lagipula Hidup Akan Berakhir |
| "Kita Ke Sana" | 2024 | Lagipula Hidup Akan Berakhir |
| "Setiap Waktu" | 2024 | Non-album single |
| "Right Where You Left Me" (with eaJ) | 2024 | When the Rain Stopped Following Me |
| "Jika" (with Danilla) | 2025 | Non-album single |
| "Nafas" (with Dipha Barus) | 2026 | Non-album single |

==== As featured artist ====
| Title | Year | Album |
|---|---|---|
| ".Fin" (Loner Lunar featuring Hindia) | 2019 | A Brief Tale of Long Search |
| "Sementara" (Laze featuring Hindia) | 2019 | Puncak Janggal |
| "Alunan Temu" (Bilal Indrajaya featuring Hindia and Isyana Sarasvati) | 2022 | Non-album singles |
| "Rudi (Wawancara Liar)" (Matter Mos featuring Hindia) | 2024 | Non-album singles |
| "Hari Ini" (Isyana Sarasvati featuring Hindia) | 2025 | Lunora |
| "Masih Ada Cahaya" (Idgitaf featuring Hindia) | 2026 | Berusaha di Bawah Hujan |

== Filmography ==
Film performances
| Year | Title | Role | Notes |
|---|---|---|---|
| 2020 | One Day We'll Talk About Today | Himself | Cameo appearance |

== Accolades ==
| Award | Year (Note: Indicates the year of ceremony. Each year is linked to the article about the awards held that year, wherever possible.) | Category | Recipient | Result | Ref. |
|---|---|---|---|---|---|
| Anugerah Musik Indonesia | 2019 | Newcomer of the Year | Himself for "Secukupnya" | Nominated | |
| Anugerah Musik Indonesia | 2019 | Best Alternative Solo Act | Himself for "Secukupnya" | Nominated | |
| LINE Indonesia Awards | 2019 | Most Favorite Male Musician | Hindia | Nominated | |
| Anugerah Musik Indonesia | 2020 | Album of the Year | Menari Dengan Bayangan | Nominated | |
| Anugerah Musik Indonesia | 2020 | Best Alternative Solo Act | Himself for "Rumah Ke Rumah" | Won | |
| Billboard Indonesia Music Awards | 2020 | Top New Artist of the Year | Hindia | Nominated | |
| Billboard Indonesia Music Awards | 2020 | Top Social Artist of the Year | Hindia | Nominated | |
| Anugerah Musik Indonesia | 2021 | Best Alternative Solo Act | Himself for "Setengah Tahun Ini" | Nominated | |
| Anugerah Musik Indonesia | 2022 | Best Rock Duo/Group/Collaboration | Pee Wee Gaskins & Hindia for "Vaya Con Dios" | Nominated | |
| Anugerah Musik Indonesia | 2023 | Best Alternative Solo Act | Himself for "Janji Palsu" | Won | |
| Anugerah Musik Indonesia | 2024 | Production Work of the Year | "Cincin" | Nominated | |
| Anugerah Musik Indonesia | 2024 | Album of the Year | Lagipula Hidup Akan Berakhir | Nominated | |
| Anugerah Musik Indonesia | 2024 | Best Alternative Solo Act | Himself for "Cincin" | Won | |
| Anugerah Musik Indonesia | 2024 | Best Alternative Album | Lagipula Hidup Akan Berakhir | Won | |
| Anugerah Musik Indonesia | 2025 | Production Work of the Year | Himself for "everything u are" | Nominated | |
| Anugerah Musik Indonesia | 2025 | Album of the Year | Doves, 25' on Blank Canvas | Won | |
| Anugerah Musik Indonesia | 2025 | Best Alternative Solo Act | Himself for "everything u are" | Won | |
| Anugerah Musik Indonesia | 2025 | Best Alternative Album | Doves, 25' on Blank Canvas | Won | |
| Anugerah Musik Indonesia | 2025 | Best Music Video | Himself for "everything u are" | Won | |
| Music Awards Japan | 2026 | Special Award: Indonesian Popular Music | "everything u are" | Won | |
