= Elephant Kind =

Indonesian alt-pop band

- Origin: Jakarta, Indonesia
- Genres: Alt-pop
- Years active: 2014–present
- Labels: Mola; Frisson; Cubs Club
- Members: Bam Mastro; Bayu Adisapoetra; Kevin Septanto
- Past members: John Paul Patton; Dewa Pratama

Elephant Kind are an Indonesian alt-pop band, formed in 2014, consisting of Bam Mastro, Bayu Adisapoetra, and Kevin Septanto. They have released two studio albums and three extended plays. The group is currently based in London.

== Career ==
Elephant Kind originated as the final project of vocalist Bam Mastro during his studies at the Western Australian Academy of Performing Arts. After graduating, Mastro returned to Indonesia and formed the band with members of his sister Neonomora's live band: Bayu Adisapoetra, John Paul Patton, and Dewa Pratama. In 2014, they released their debut concept extended play, Scenarios: A Short Film by Elephant Kind, centered on the fictional character Julian Day following his suicide. They released their sophomore extended play, Promenades: A Short Film by Elephant Kind in 2015, a prequel that explores Day's life. In November 2015, John Paul Patton left the band to focus on his other project, Kelompok Penerbang Roket. The story of Julian Day was then adapted into a short film by Gianni Fajri, which was released in April 2016.

The group released their debut studio album, City J in September 2016. In 2017, they received two Anugerah Musik Indonesia nominations, including Best New Artist. Mastro started his solo career with a single "Idols" in April 2017, followed by extended plays I Bleach My Skin and I'm An Albino Polar Bear Living in Captivity and I Know Aliens Don't Exist a year later. Drummer Bayu Adisapoetra also started his solo career under the moniker SoftAnimal with an extended play Nanook in 2018. In November 2018, Dewa Pratama left the band due to personal issues. He was replaced by bassist Kevin Septanto.

In March 2019, the band released their sophomore studio album The Greatest Ever. In 2022, they decided to move to London, in order to target wider international market. They signed a recording contract with Mola Records, a subsidiary of Mola.

They released an extended play Superblue in March 2023, co-produced with Sam Petts-Davies. In May 2023, they released a documentary From Indo to England about their move to London and the making of Superblue. They were nominated for the Best Rock Video – UK at the 2023 UK Music Video Awards. In August 2025, they are set to perform their first show in Indonesia in six years, with performances scheduled in Jakarta and Bandung.

== Members ==
Current members

- Bam Mastro – vocals, guitar (2014–present)
- Bayu Adisapoetra – drums (2014–present)
- Kevin Septanto – bass (2018–present)

Former members

- John Paul Patton – bass (2014–2015)
- Dewa Pratama – guitar, synthesizer (2014–2018)

== Discography ==
=== Studio albums ===
Title	Details
City J	Released: 21 September 2016; Label: Frisson
The Greatest Ever	Released: 15 March 2019; Label: Cubs Club

=== Extended plays ===
Title	Details
Scenarios: A Short Film by Elephant Kind	Released: 26 November 2014; Label: Frisson
Promenades: A Short Film By Elephant Kind	Released: 30 September 2015; Label: Frisson
Superblue	Released: 31 March 2023; Label: Mola

=== Singles ===
Title	Year	Album
"Be Somebody"	2014	Non-album singles
"We All Lose (Holy Shit)"	2014	Non-album singles
"Oh Well"	2014	Scenarios: A Short Film by Elephant Kind
"Why Did You Have to Go"	2015	Promenades: A Short Film By Elephant Kind
"With Grace"	2015	Promenades: A Short Film By Elephant Kind
"Beat the Ordinary"	2016	City J
"Montage"	2016	City J
"True Love"	2017	City J
"Sour"	2018	The Greatest Ever
"Pleaser"	2019	The Greatest Ever
"I Believe in You"	2019	The Greatest Ever
"Oh Well (Reprise)"	2020	Non-album singles
"Modern Romance Dreaming (Lonely)"	2021	Non-album singles
"Rockstar"	2022	Superblue
"Love As"	2023	Superblue
"Louder"	2024	Non-album singles
"Good Times"	2024	Non-album singles
"Lionel"	2024	Non-album singles

== Awards and nominations ==
Award	Year	Category	Nominee(s)	Result	Ref.
Anugerah Musik Indonesia	2017	Best New Artist	Themselves	Nominated	
Anugerah Musik Indonesia	2017	Best Alternative/Alternative Rock/Multi-Genre Production Work	"Beat the Ordinary"	Nominated	
Anugerah Musik Indonesia	2019	Best Alternative Duo/Group/Vocal Group/Collaboration	"Better Days" (featuring Heidi)	Nominated	
Anugerah Musik Indonesia	2019	Best Sound Production Team	Bam Mastro for "Better Days"	Nominated	
Indonesian Choice Awards	2017	Breakthrough Artist of the Year	Themselves	Nominated	
UK Music Video Awards	2023	Best Rock Video – UK	"Love As"	Nominated	
