= Pamungkas =

Pamungkas is an Indonesian surname. Notable people with the surname include:

- Bambang Pamungkas (born 1980), Indonesian football manager and former player
- Catur Pamungkas (born 1989), Indonesian footballer
- Dimas Pamungkas (born 2004), Indonesian footballer
- Dony Tri Pamungkas (born 2005), Indonesian footballer
- Pamungkas (singer) (born 1993), Indonesian singer
- Yulius Pamungkas (born 2000), Indonesian footballer

== See also ==
- PT Wunderman Pamungkas Indonesia
