= Trees & Wild =

Indonesian folk band

THE TREES & THE WILD
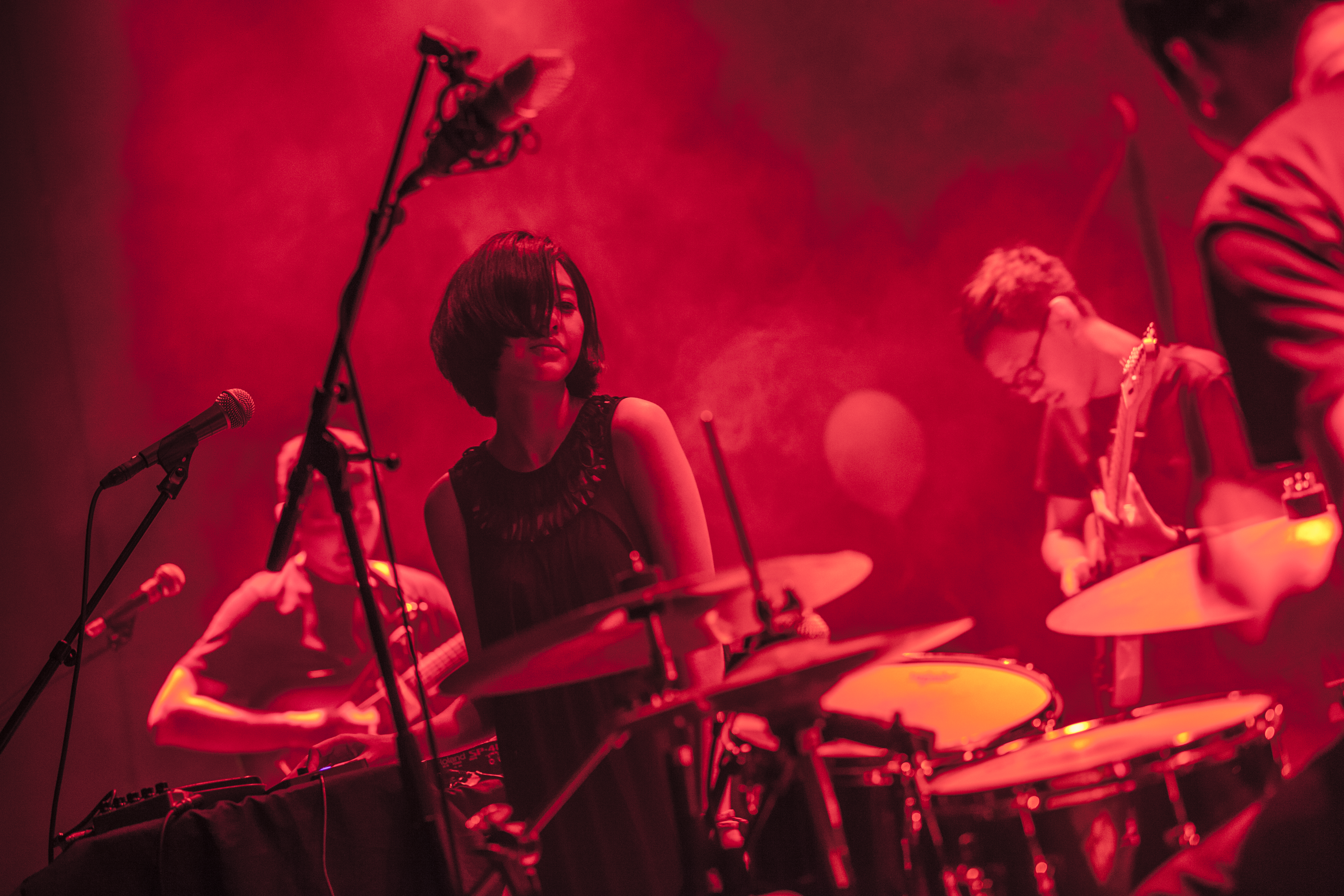
- Trees & Wild performing in Helsinki, Finland in September 2014

Background information
- Also known as: Trees & Wild, TTATW
- Origin: Bekasi, West Java, Indonesia
- Genres: Post-rock, Folk, Ambient, Experimental
- Years active: 2005–present
- Labels: Lil' Fish Records, Blank Orb Recordings
- Members: Remedy Waloni; Andra Kurniawan; Charita Utami; Hertri Nur Pamungkas; Tyo Prasetya
- Website: thetreesandthewild.com

The Trees & The Wild (often stylized as TREES & WILD) is an Indonesian band, formed in Bekasi, West Java in 2005, and currently based in Jakarta, Indonesia. The band is known for its musical blend of ambient, post-rock and folk, underpinned with pop elements with distinctly Indonesian identity.

== Biography ==
The Trees & The Wild emerged in 2005 as a home-recording project by Remedy Waloni. In this period, with help from university classmates, including high school friend Andra Kurniawan, he recorded and posted a number of tracks on Myspace. With Andra Kurniawan they later developed the initial tracks written by Remedy and the first incarnation of the band was born. Local independent label Lil'Fish Records discovered The Trees & The Wild on Myspace in 2008 and recorded those demos the following year, which became an album called Rasuk. In 2010 drummer Hertri Nur Pamungkas joined the group. Soon after, bassist Eka Sapta Prasetya (Tyo) and singer Charita Utami joined the group, completing the line-up.

The band started touring Indonesia in Java and Sulawesi around 2009-2011. And in between, they toured the neighboring countries such as Malaysia and Singapore, including five performances at The Esplanade's annual Mosaic Music Festival in 2011 and Baybeats Festival in 2012. In 2011, TIME Magazine called the Jakarta-based the must see Asian band of 2011.

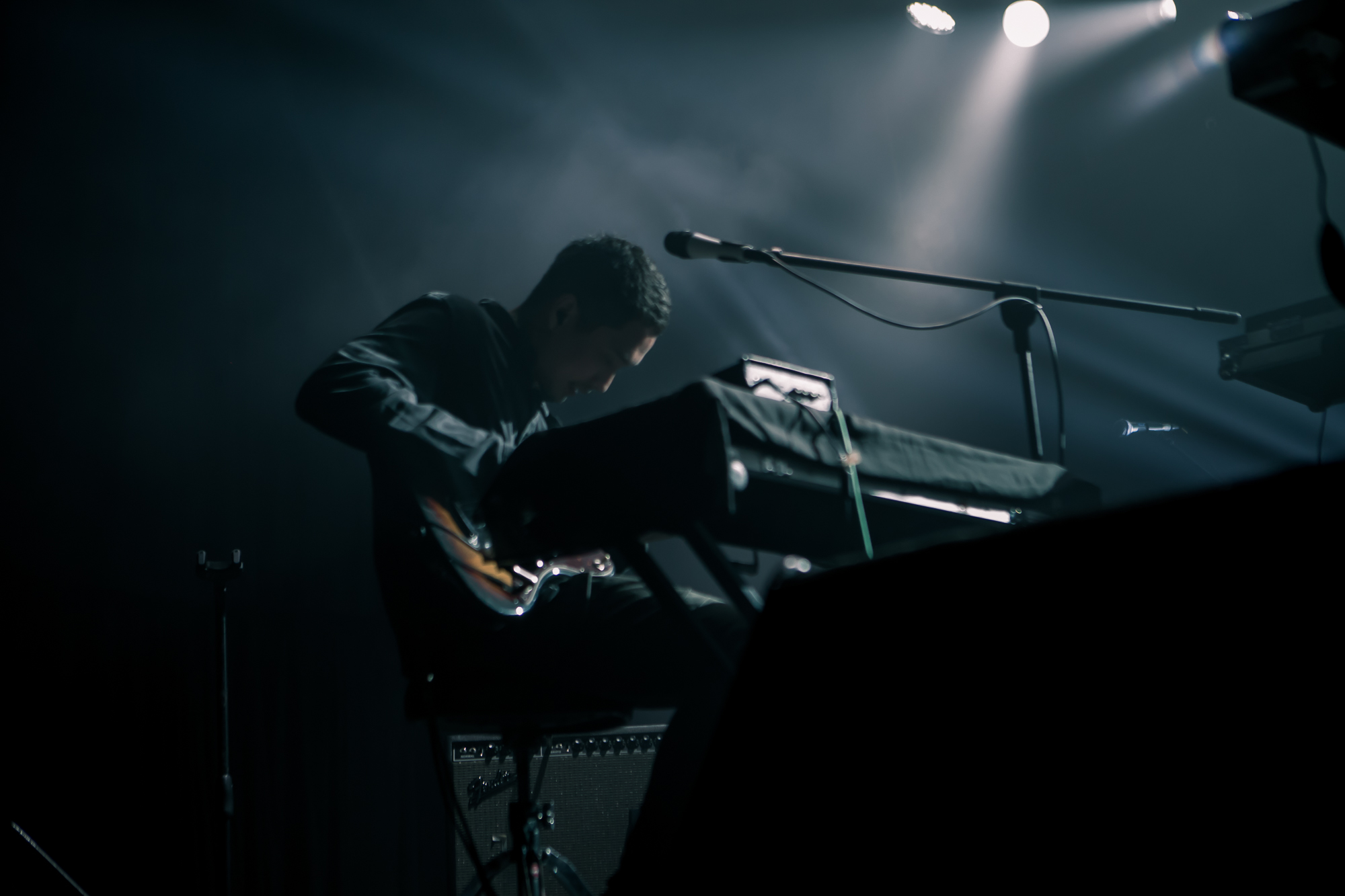
Remedy Waloni on stage at KL Live, Kuala Lumpur on May 10, 2017

In 2012 the band performed at the Urbanscapes Festival in Kuala Lumpur, Malaysia, Reeperbahn Festival in Hamburg, Germany and the Monsters of Pop Festival in Tampere, Finland along with shows in Helsinki and Tallinn, Estonia. During this European tour the band released a limited EP entitled Tuah/Sebak.

2014 saw the band opening for Deerhoof in Singapore. The band also performed at Niubi Festival in Helsinki, Finland.

On August 10, 2016, the band's sophomore album, Zaman, Zaman was announced for release on September 16, 2016. They also released a video for the single Zaman, Zaman.

Zaman, Zaman was released on September 16, 2016, which went straight to No.1 on iTunes’ Alternative charts in Indonesia and was noted by many as a large stylistic shift for the band, which comprised a more atmospheric and experimental approach. The album received high appraisals from music magazines in the region and is considered one of the best Indonesian albums of 2016. Following the release, the band toured Singapore, Malaysia and Indonesia. The band also performed at Clockenflap Festival 2016 in Hong Kong.

In May 2017, The Trees & The Wild opened for Mew on their Asian Tour in Kuala Lumpur, Malaysia.

== Discography ==
=== Albums ===
- Rasuk (2009, Lil' Fish Records)
- Zaman, Zaman (2016, Blank Orb Recordings)

=== EPs ===
- Tuah/Sebak (2012, Self-released)
- Ekati (2014, Blood Spirit Records)

=== Singles ===
- Monumen (Gulf of Meru Remix) (2017, Blank Orb Recordings)
- Zaman, Zaman (Gardika Gigih Remix) (2017, Blank Orb Recordings)
