= The Adams =

Indonesian indie rock band

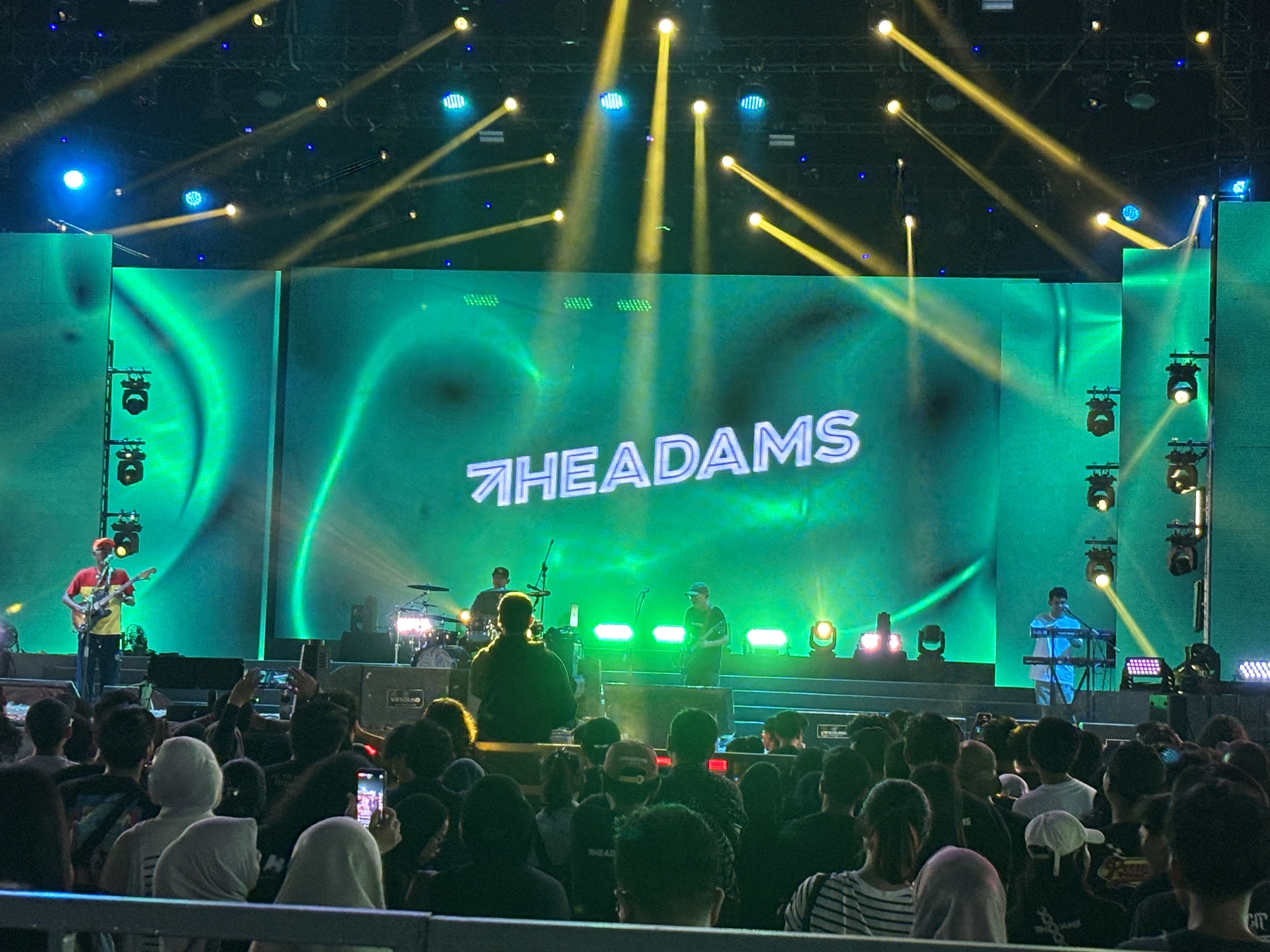
- The Adams at Jakarta Fair, July 2025

Background information
- Origin: Jakarta, Indonesia
- Genres: Rock; alternative rock; indie rock; power pop; progressive rock; pop rock
- Years active: 2002–2010; 2014–present
- Labels: Aksara; Belakang Teras
- Members: Ario Hendarwan; Saleh Husein; Gigih Suryoprayogo Setiadi; Varizan
- Past members: Martino Runtukahu; Setyo Dwiharso; Bawono Adhiantoro; Bimo Dwipoalam; Arfan; Retiara Haswidya; Pandu Fathoni; Citra Winitya; Ghina Salsabila
- Website: theadamsband.com

The Adams is Indonesian indie rock band and was formed in Jakarta, Indonesia in 2002 at the Jakarta Institute of Arts.

== History ==
After a number of jam sessions together, Ario Hendarwan (guitar, vocals), Martino "Tino" Runtukahu (guitar), Setyo Dwiharso (bass) and Bawono "Beni" Adhiantoro (drums) formed Lonely Band during their studies at the Jakarta Institute of Arts in 2002. Not long after the band changed their name to the Adams, Tino and Setyo departed, being replaced by Saleh "Ale" Husein (also of White Shoes & the Couples Company) on guitar and vocals as well as Bimo Dwipoalam on drums, with Beni now on bass.

In 2004, the Adams contributed a track "Mosque of Love" to a compilation album, JKT:SKRG initiated by independent record label Aksara Records. Their appearance on the album caught the attention of film producer Nia Dinata, who invited them to work on the soundtrack of Janji Joni, Joko Anwar's directorial debut film. The band contributed two tracks to the soundtrack, "Konservatif" and "Waiting". The band's self-titled debut album was released on 15 June 2005 under Aksara Records, featuring "Konservatif" and "Waiting". The former was ranked 136th on the list of "The 150 Greatest Indonesian Songs of All Time", compiled by Rolling Stone Indonesia.

At the end of 2005, founding member Beni left the Adams to focus on drumming for his other band, the Upstairs. Bimo, wanting to continue his education in Bali, also departed. They were replaced by Karon 'N Roll guitarist Arfan "Apoy" (bass) and Gigih Suryoprayogo "Kiting" Setiadi (drums, vocals) from It's Different Class. Additionally, touring musician Retiara "Kaka" Haswidya (keyboards, vocals) became an official member of the band. In 2006, the band released their sophomore album titled V2.05, featuring singles "Halo Beni" and "Hanya Kau". The album was ranked 112th by Rolling Stone Indonesia on the list of "The 150 Greatest Indonesian Albums of All Time". Around 2010, the band went on an extended period of inactivity, due to the members focusing on other projects.

The Adams returned in 2014 after an encounter with Morfem guitarist Pandu Fathoni convinced Kiting to get the band back together. With Pandu replacing Apoy on bass, the band would go on to perform for the first time in almost four years at the Jaya Pub in Jakarta. In 2017, they released an extended play titled ß Release, consisting of b-sides and a cover of Naif's "Jikalau", which previously appeared on a 2007 tribute album called Mesin Waktu: Teman-Teman Menyanyikan Lagu Naif. On 8 January 2018, Kaka died due to illness.

Now with Citra "Ciwi" Winitya from L'Alphalpha on keyboards and vocals, the Adams released new material for the first time in twelve years on Record Store Day 2018 with the single "Pelantur". In 2019, Ciwi asked to leave the band to spend more time with her family. On 15 March 2019, the band independently released their third studio album Agterplaas, with Ghina Salsabila replacing Ciwi on keyboards and vocals. In an interview with Pophariini, Ale revealed that Agterplaas was "The Adams' most difficult album". The song "Dalam Doa" from the album is dedicated to Kaka, as well as Ale's late mother. A 45-minute documentary film about the making of the album titled Masa-Masa: Sebuah Dokumenter Pembuatan Agterplaas, directed by Cakti Prawirabishma, was released alongside the album's box set.

At the start of 2024, it was announced that Pandu and Ghina would depart the Adams to pursue other projects. In September 2024, jazz musician Ardhito Pramono featured in some tour dates on guitar and vocals, filling in for an absent Ale.

== Band members ==
Current members

- Ario Hendarwan – guitar, vocals (2002–2010, 2014–present)
- Saleh "Ale" Husein – guitar, vocals (2002–2010, 2014–present)
- Gigih Suryoprayogo "Kiting" Setiadi – drums, vocals (2005–2010, 2014–present)

Former members

- Martino "Tino" Runtukahu – guitar (2002)
- Setyo Dwiharso – bass (2002)
- Bawono "Beni" Adhiantoro – drums (2002), bass (2002–2005)
- Bimo Dwipoalam – drums (2002–2005)
- Arfan "Apoy" – bass (2005–2010)
- Retiara "Kaka" Haswidya – keyboards, vocals (2005–2010, 2014–2018; her death)
- Pandu Fathoni – bass (2014–2024)
- Citra "Ciwi" Winitya – keyboards, vocals (2018–2019)
- Ghina Salsabila – keyboards, vocals (2019–2024)

Former touring musicians

- Ardhito Pramono – guitar, vocals (guest 2022; 2024)

== Discography ==
=== Studio albums ===
List of studio albums
Title	Album details
The Adams	Released: 15 June 2005; Label: Aksara
V2.05	Released: 31 August 2006; Label: Aksara
Agterplaas	Released: 15 March 2019; Label: Belakang Teras

=== Extended plays ===
List of extended plays
Title	Album details
ß Release	Released: 16 July 2017; Label: Belakang Teras

=== Singles ===
==== As lead artist ====
List of singles as lead artist, showing year released and album name
Title	Year	Album
"Konservatif"	2005	The Adams
"Waiting"	2005	The Adams
"Halo Beni"	2006	V2.05
"Hanya Kau"	2006	V2.05
"Pelantur"	2018	Agterplaas
"Masa-Masa"	2019	Agterplaas

==== As featured artist ====
List of singles as featured artists, showing year released and album name
Title	Year	Album
"Itu Aku" (Basboi feat. The Adams)	2024	80.1 FM Boi Radio

=== Guest appearances ===
List of non-single guest appearances, with other performing artists, showing year released and album name
Title	Year	Other performer(s)	Album
"Mosque of Love"	2004	Various artists	JKT:SKRG
"Waiting"	2005	Various artists	Janji Joni
"Jikalau"	2007	Various artists	Mesin Waktu: Teman-Teman Menyanyikan Lagu Naif
