= Pee Wee Gaskins (band) =

Indonesian Rock Band

- Origin: Jakarta, Indonesia
- Genres: Pop punk; Alternative rock; Power Pop
- Years active: 2007–present
- Labels: Knurd Records (2008); Variant Records (2009); Alfa Records (2010); Universal Music Indonesia (2016-2019)
- Members: Alditsa "Dochi" Sadega; Fauzan "Sansan"; Harry "Ayi" Pramahardhika; Reza "omo" Satiri; Renaldy "Aldy" Prasetya
- Past members: Agung "Den Sinyo" Wahyu Dewantoro
- Website: http://www.instagram.com/pwgofficial/

Pee Wee Gaskins (often abbreviated as PWG) is a rock band from Indonesia formed in 2007. The lineup consists of Dochi, Sansan, Ayi, Omo, and Aldy. They have released six albums, Stories From Our High School Years (2008), The Sophomore (2009), Ad Astra Per Aspera (2010), A Youth Not Wasted (2016), Salute to 90's (2018), and Mixed Feeling (2019).

== Name ==
Sansan and Dochi wanted a serial killer as a name for their band, after doing some research on the internet, they found Donald Henry Gaskins, an American serial killer and chose his nickname, "Pee Wee," as their band's name. Gaskins was portrayed by Brad Dourif in a 1986 telefilm about his last murder that led to his death sentence.

== Career ==
In April 2007, the band released their first EP, Stories from Our High School Years, through Knurd Records which sold 2000 copies.

In early 2009, the band released its first full-length album, The Sophomore, through Variant Records, which sold more than 20,000 copies.

In 2010, Ad Astra Per Aspera was released. This album features reduced synthesizers and notably different lyrics compared to their two previous albums.

In 2016, Pee Wee Gaskins signed to Universal Music Indonesia and released third album, A Youth Not Wasted. They also served as an opening act for Australian band, 5 Seconds of Summer's Sound Live Feels Live World Tour at the Indonesia Convention Exhibition in Jakarta, Indonesia.

In 2018, Pee Wee Gaskins released a mini album, it's called "Salute To 90's". It features 5 cover songs of Indonesia's 90's greatest hits.

In 2019, Pee Wee Gaskins released new full-length album, it's called "Mixed Feeling". The album cover was made by Dochi's daughter and the sleeve boxset cover was made by the daughter of senior music journalist Adib Hidayat, named Jemima. This album was produced by Erix Soekamti personnel from the band called "Endank Soekamti".

== Fans ==
Fans of the band have several names, including Party Dorks, Dorkzilla, and Tatiana. The band also had a short-lived anti-fan group called Anti-Pee Wee Gaskins, abbreviated as APWG, but APWG has not appeared since 2009.

== Band members ==
Current members

- Alditsa "Dochi" Sadega — vocals, bass guitar (2007–present)
- Fauzan "Sansan" — vocals, guitar (2007–present)
- Harry "Ayi" Pramahardhika — guitar, backing vocals (2008–present)
- Reza "Omo" Satiri — keyboard, synthesizer, piano, backing vocals (2007–present)
- Renaldy "Aldy" Prasetya — drums, percussion (2008–present)

Former members

- Andhika "Tlor" - bass guitar (2007–2008)

== Discography ==
Year	Title
2008	Stories from Our High School Years: Label: Knurd Records
2009	The Sophomore: Label: Variant Records
2010	Ad Astra Per Aspera: Label: Alfa Records
2012	You and I Going South (EP): Label: Self-Released
2013	The Transit (EP): Label: Self-Released
2014	2014 (EP): Label: Self-Released
2016	A Youth Not Wasted: Label: Universal Music Indonesia
2018	Salute to 90's (EP): Label: Universal Music Indonesia
2019	Mixed Feeling: Label: Universal Music Indonesia
