= Neonomora =

Indonesian musician (born 1988)

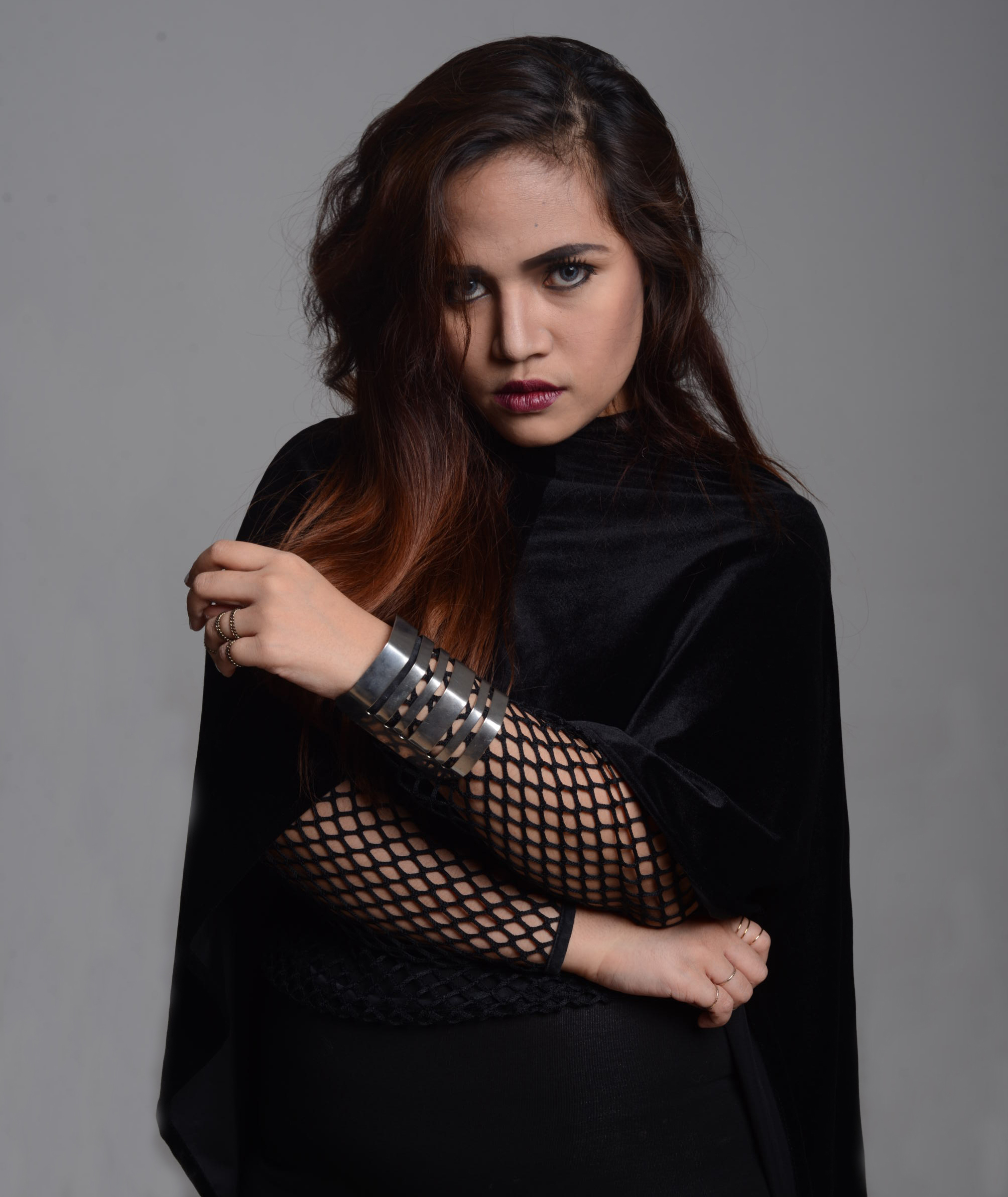
- Neonomora in 2014

Background information
- Born: Ratih Suryahutamy; 16 May 1988 (age 38); Indonesia
- Genres: Indie, folk rock, rock, pop, electronic
- Occupations: Singer, song-writer, artist, writer, illustrator, graphic designer
- Years active: 2012 – present
- Labels: SAORSA Records (2018 - present), Frisson Entertainment (Indonesia) (2013 — 2017), Moorworks Records (Japan)
- Website: neonomora.com

Neonomora (/'niːɒn-nōmôrɑː/), born Ratih Suryahutamy, 16 May 1988) is an Indonesian singer, songwriter, artist. Neonomora released her debut album SEEDS, independently in November 2014. Born in Jakarta, Indonesia and raised in different countries including United States, China and Australia. With the help from her brother Bam Mastro as the music producer and Adhe Arrio as the co-producer and music engineer, Neonomora released her debut EP on 25 November 2013. Her first single You Want My Love peaked at number one on Mustang Top 20 by Jakarta-based radio station Mustang 88 FM, a month after the release. Neonomora's sound has been described as a combination of various genres, including folk, rock, soul, RnB and electronic; instruments found in her songs include violins, upright bass, harp, acoustic and electric guitars, banjo, mandolin, glockenspiel and synthesizers.

Neonomora had received praise across the media. BuzzFeed, entitled her as one of the "10 Incredible Indonesian Bands You Should Listen To". Neonomora's self-titled debut EP was awarded Album Terbaik Indonesia 2013 (Best Indonesian Albums in 2013) by Rolling Stone Indonesia and was nominated as "Breakthrough Artist of The Year" by NET.TV in May 2014. In the following year, her debut SEEDS also made it to Album Terbaik Indonesia 2014 (Best Indonesian Albums in 2014) by Rolling Stone Indonesia. Neonomora was signed to be represented as an artist for sync licensing opportunities by a Chicago-based record label Minty Fresh in the year 2013 to 2016, after releasing her self-titled EP.

== Early life ==
Ratih Suryahutamy was born on 16 May 1988 in Jakarta, Indonesia. Her father, Bambang Khaeroni, was an Indonesian Industry and Trade Attaché, and her mother, Srie Kartika Warnie was the CEO of Asuransi Ekspor Indonesia (Indonesia Export Insurance). Her mother was also a singer back in the day; she used to perform on a nationwide singing competition and had collaborated with Indonesian Jazz musicians, namely Jack Lesmana and Bubi Chen. Neonomora's younger brother Bam Mastro (known for being the frontman of his band Elephant Kind) is also a singer, songwriter and producer. Through her mother, Neonomora is a descendant of Sultan Hamengkubuwono the First, a Yogyakarta ancestry. Her family moved frequently because of her father's diplomatic obligation, and lived in places including Illinois, Beijing, Taiwan and Perth. She began performing at a Christmas Eve Celebration in Illinois, Chicago in 1991 as she was pushed to sing alone on stage by her parents. She recalled the memory on an interview and stated that "It's the night I knew I was going to be a performer".

As a child Neonomora suffered from what she calls an ‘ugly-duckling’ period in her life; she was the victim of junior high school bully and her love of music was the major reason she was targeted by bullies. She stated on her blog that, "The mean girls at school one day forced me to sing in front of the class and they would take things out of the trash and threw them into my mouth while I was singing". Despite her affluent upbringing by her parents, Neonomora says that her parents "both came from middle-class families, so we've worked for everything – my mother worked eight to eleven out of the house, and so did my father". Although Neonomora is known as the bubbly girl in the family, she used to be an introverted child, due to her parents who were both working and claims that she used music as a form of escape from her turbulent school days.

Neonomora attended 77 High School and was a member and the conductor of the 77 High choirs. Her art teacher asked her to form a musical group to compete in a nationwide musical competition, where the group was awarded first place in 2002. She had to move to Beijing, China at 11th grade along with her family and continued her studies at Beijing World Youth Academy. After graduating from Beijing World Youth Academy, Neonomora attended Perth Institute of Business and Technology. Later when she graduated as a diploma for Communication Studies, she entered Edith Cowan University and began taking illustration classes. She subsequently attended but decided not to attend the graduation ceremony just three days before the graduation ceremony was held, where she was an Arts and Communications major.

== Music career ==
Following her father's diplomatic obligation, as a teenager Neonomora became involved in Indonesian Embassy stage activities and started to sing for diplomatic audience. When she was nine years young, her mother bought her a cassette of Mariah Carey's "Number 1's" and persuaded her to practice on singing with the album. For her achievement in singing Mariah Carey's high-pitched songs and remembering all the lyrics of the album, her mother rewarded her with adding more notes to her allowance.

Neonomora revealed a rebellious nature and acerbic wit in her music, writing and on interviews. She had received positive notices by the press, including The Jakarta Post that wrote, "The local music scene has probably never heard the rich music she presents on this record" and "The songs on this album can be danced to and mix well with Neonomora's beautiful voice, which is rare on the local music scene".

Although her parents were supportive of her musical affinity, they reined in her dream to pursue singing as a career, as they didn't see being a musician would make ends meet in order to live what they pictured as a ‘promising life’. When she finally returned to Indonesia in 2011, Neonomora worked at a local radio station as a Public Relations Practitioner, where she got fired from in 2012. She didn't inform her parents regarding the situation. Consequently, she would leave the house and return as though she still had the job. Unknowingly to her parents, she was producing the songs for her debut the entire time. When she released her first single, she finally came out and confided in them about wanting to begin her career in music.

Neonomora released her debut single You Want My Love on 25 November 2012. She put out the song on her website for a free download. Digital platforms weren't officially launched in Indonesia during this time. In a matter of three days, the song was downloaded 4000 times. She immediately received calls for interviews, as people seemed to be drawn to the bizarre stage name and the representation of music that didn't sound familiar to the industry right off the bat.

Having released her first single independently, she worked on almost everything herself, including her own branding; making a logo, posters, flyers, and album artworks. She also directed the music video of her first single You Want My Love, with the help of his cousin and her then boyfriend. Not having the means to hire a media-release practitioner, she wrote her first few press releases. Having learned all that in the university, she mastered self-branding throughout the entire process.

She soon co-founded an independent record label called Frisson Entertainment in 2014 with her then husband. It first started when the calls from bands from allover the country abruptly came in, right when she put out the name Frisson Entertainment as her "official" label on her website with a telephone number written on the page.

The decision to eventually make the label official came from an intention to help nurture the local and nationwide musicians with their crafts in order to reach their fullest potential. Although with very small funds to begin with, her fondness of branding and other creative strands also motivated her to finally launch the label. The label birthed several musicians and bands whose names are now of prominence in the Indonesian music industry.

Alas, the label dropped anchor in 2016. The marriage was also annulled in 2018. Neonomora then decided to also renounce from the label and continued on with her own, with a label she named SAORSA Records. The name SAORSA is derived from a Scottish Gaelic word, the word that she saw on a streetwall during her first ever trip to Scotland, which means freedom, salvation, redemption and liberty.

Neonomora released her second studio album titled Waters in 2018. Waters took a lengthy process in the making; four years long and having delayed a few times because of some personal breakdowns she went through. The record was almost not released. Subsequently, Neonomora was nominated as The Best Rock Solo Artist by AMI Awards (Anugerah Musik Indonesia Awards) in 2019 for the album.

== Style and influences ==
During an interview, Neonomora cited Bjork as her influence and "hero". Neonomora's style has been described as "dark and electrifying" as she mostly wears dark-colored outfits both on stage and in the day-to-day life. Neonomora stated that plenty of the lyrics she wrote contain some political issues that's happening in Indonesia.

She stated that she had mimicked other singers while growing up and counts Mariah Carey, Whitney Houston, Aretha Franklin, Stevie Wonder and Roberta Flack as her early influences. In one of her many exclusive interviews, Neonomora cited the King of pop Michael Jackson as her biggest music influence, referencing his artistry and how he reflected the times.

== Writing and art ==
Neonomora demonstrated an affinity for the arts at an early age; she began writing poetry when she was five years old. Her mother recalled that she first took notices of Neonomora's passion for music and drawing when she was in the third grade.

Neonomora began drawing and writing creatively at an early age with the encouragement of his parents. She collected her stories, poetry, illustrations up to this day.

== Discography ==
=== Singles ===
- "You Want My Love" (2012)
- "Fight!" (2013)
- "Too Young" (2013)
- "The Man" (2014)
- "Seeds" (2015)
- "Be Still, My Soul" (2016)

=== Albums ===
Studio albums

- Seeds (October 2014 - Available on CD and Digital Format)
- Seeds - Japan Edition (February 2016 - Available on CD for Japan Market)
- Waters (2018)

EPs

- Neonomora EP (November 2013 - Available on CD and Digital Format)
- Neonomora EP – Deluxe (2014 - Digital Format)

== Achievements ==
- The Young Gun 2013 – Rolling Stone magazine Indonesia
- Top Rank Best Indonesian Album 2013 – Rolling Stone magazine Indonesia
- Top Rank Best Indonesian Album 2014 – Rolling Stone magazine Indonesia
- Breakthrough Artist of The Year (Nominated) – Indonesian Choice Awards 2014 by NET.
- Best New Profile (Winner) – Local Heroes Awards 2013 by ButikMusik Indonesia
- 10 Incredible Indonesian Bands You Should Listen To – BuzzFeed USA
- Featured Artist – Reverbnation USA
- #1 on Chart Musik Anak Negri – Mustang FM Jakarta Indonesia
- Most Anticipated Indonesian Artist – HAI MAgazine Indonesia
- The Chosen Act – NYLON Magazine Indonesia
- "Well, I think once her voice being heard by the world, Neonomora will shine brighter than the God of the sun and the Goddess of the moon" – NYLON Magazine Indonesia
- Musician that will shine in 2013 – YAHOO!OMG Indonesia
- You Want My Love " Top 100 – October 2013" – iTunes Malaysia
