= White Shoes & the Couples Company =

Indonesian pop band

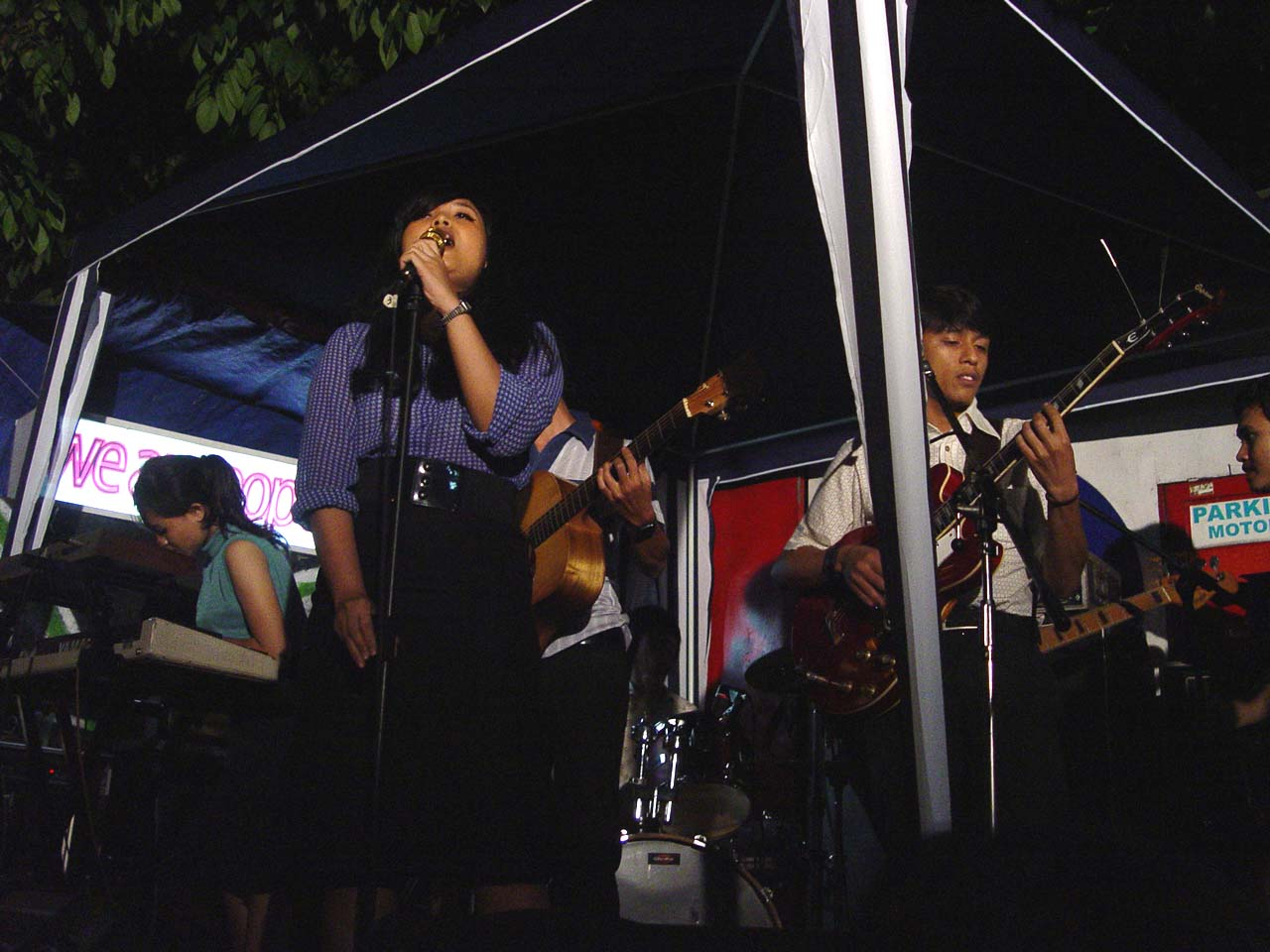
- White Shoes & the Couples Company performing live at We Are Pop

Background information
- Origin: Jakarta, Indonesia
- Genres: Pop; jazz; funk; disco
- Years active: 2002–present
- Labels: Aksara Records; Minty Fresh
- Members: Aprilia Apsari; Yusmario Farabi; Saleh Husein; Ricky Virgana; Aprimela Prawidyanti; John Navid
- Website: Official website

White Shoes & the Couples Company is an Indonesian pop band from Jakarta, Indonesia. The band are currently signed to both Indonesian label Aksara Records and American independent label Minty Fresh. Their music is influenced by Indonesian film soundtracks from the 1970s, 1930s jazz, disco, and 1960s pop music.

== Overview ==
Aprilia Apsari and Yusmario Farabi met each other while they were both studied at the fine art faculty in Jakarta Institute Of Arts. The two formed the band with their colleague, Saleh Husein (also of the Adams) in 2002. In 2004, Ricky Virgana, John Navid and Aprimela Prawidiyanti joined. The band came up with the name due to the fad of wearing white shoes at the school where they met. The band sings the majority of its songs in Indonesian.

In 2005, the band released their self-titled album on Aksara Records. In 2007, they released an EP titled Skenario Masa Muda in 2007. Eventually, the band was signed by Minty Fresh, and re-released their self-titled album for an international release. With Apsari’s vocals trilling in English and her mother tongue and classical music instruments and phrasings (the eight-minute “Nothing to Fear”) standing out alongside groovy, bouncy nuggets like “Top Star” and “Brother John.” That blend has landed White Shoes & the Couples Company on some Indonesian film soundtracks, including Berbagi Suami and Joko Anwar films Janji Joni and Quickie Express.

The band was honored by Rolling Stone as one of the best 25 bands on Myspace. They were also honored by AllMusic as one of the 25 most crushworthy bands of 2006.

== Band members ==
- Aprilia Apsari – lead vocals
- Yusmario Farabi – rhythm guitar, backing vocals
- Saleh Husein – lead guitar, backing vocals
- Ricky Virgana – bass, backing vocals
- Aprimela Prawidiyanti – keyboards, backing vocals
- John Navid – drums, percussion, backing vocals

== Discography ==
=== Albums ===
- White Shoes & the Couples Company (2005)
- Album Vakansi (2010)
- 2020 (2021)

=== EPs ===
- Skenario Masa Muda (2007)
- Six Live Selection (2012)
- Menyanyikan Lagu-Lagu Daerah (2013)

=== Singles ===
- "Senandung Maaf"
- "Windu Defrina"
- "Sunday Memory Lane"
- "Tentang Cita"
- "Aksi Kucing"
- "Pelan Tapi Pasti"
- "Senja Menggila"
- "Vakansi"
- "Irama Cita"
- "Folklor"

=== Compilation/soundtrack appearances ===
- Janji Joni film soundtrack (2005)
- Riot (compilation of Thursday Riot) (2006)
- Berbagi Suami film soundtrack (2006)
- Mesin Waktu (compilation album)
- Quickie Express film soundtrack (2007)

== See also ==
- List of Indonesian rock bands
