= List of Indonesian singers =

This is a list of singers from Indonesia.

== A ==
- Acha Septriasa – female pop singer and actress
- Afgan – male pop/R&B/soul singer, actor
- Agnez Mo – international singer
- Ahmad Albar – rock musician and vocalist
- Ahmad Dhani – pop/rock singer-songwriter, composer and record producer, owner of Republik Cinta Management.
- Amara – soul/country singer
- Andien – jazz/pop singer
- Angga Yunanda – singer and actor
- Anggun – Indonesian and French naturalized singer-songwriter, world's best selling Indonesian artist, first Indonesian who breaks worldwide music charts.
- Anneth Delliecia – singer-songwriter, actress
- Ari Lasso – pop/rock singer, former Dewa 19 vocalist
- Ariel – lead singer of Noah (formerly Peterpan)
- Ayu Ting Ting – dangdut singer

== B ==
- Benyamin Sueb – Betawi traditional singer, actor
- Bernadya – female pop singer-songwriter
- Bima Samudra – pop singer, The Voice Indonesia contestant
- Bing Slamet – singer, comedian, actor (1927–1974)
- Bob Tutupoly – iconic pop singer (1939–2022)
- Brian Imanuel – Rapper, First Indonesian rapper who breaks worldwide chart
- Broery Marantika – tenor singer
- Bunga Citra Lestari – pop singer and actress

== C ==
- Cakra Khan – pop singer with signature husky voice
- Camelia Malik – dangdut female singer
- Candra Darusman – singer-songwriter, member of Chaseiro and Karimata
- Chrisye – pop/soul/progressive rock male singer
- Cinta Laura – electropop female singer, dancer, and actress
- Cita Citata – female dangdut singer and actress
- Citra Scholastika – Indonesian female pop/jazz singer, runner-up Indonesian Idol, season 6

== D ==
- Dea Panendra – singer, actress
- Detty Kurnia – Pop Sunda vocalist (1960–2010)
- Dewi Lestari – Indonesian singer-songwriter and best selling author
- Dewi Persik – Dangdut singer
- Dewi Sandra – pop/R&B singer, dancer, actress and model
- Dewiq – rock singer and songwriter
- Didi Kempot – campursari singer
- Doel Sumbang – Sundanese pop musician

== E ==
- Ebiet G Ade – country/ballad/folk male singer
- Elvy Sukaesih – Dangdut female diva/Queen of Dangdut Indonesia
- Eros Djarot – pop Male Singer-Songwriter
- Evie Tamala – dangdut female singer

== F ==
- Fariz RM – Indonesian pop music maestro
- Fatin Shidqia – Indonesian pop singer, winner of the first season of X Factor Indonesia
- Feby Putri – singer-songwriter, known for "Runtuh"
- Francois Mohede – soul/country singer
- Freya Jayawardana – Indonesian singer and dancer

== G ==
- Ghea Indrawari – singer-songwriter, actress, host
- Gita Gutawa – pop/teen pop/classical female singer
- Glenn Fredly – pop/R&B/jazz musician
- Gombloh – pop singer and songwriter

== H ==
- Hamdan ATT – dangdut singer (1946–2025)
- Happy Asmara – Javanese pop singer-songwriter
- Harry Roesli – avant garde musician
- Hindia – indie singer-songwriter

== I ==
- Ikke Nurjanah – Indonesian dangdut singer and actress
- Indah Dewi Pertiwi – Indonesian pop singer, dancer, model
- Indra Lesmana – jazz musician, singer, songwriter and record producer
- Inul Daratista – Dangdut female singer
- Irwansyah – pop singer and actor
- Isyana Sarasvati – female pop/RnB/jazz/soul singer, pianist, and songwriter
- Iwa K – male rapper
- Iwan Fals – folk/country/ballad male singer
- Iyeth Bustami – dangdut singer, actress, politician

== J ==
- Jockie Soerjoprajogo – formerly of God Bless, keyboarder and songwriter
- Joy Tobing – winner of Indonesian Idol season 1
- Julia Perez – Dangdut singer, actress, and model for FHM and Maxim France

== K ==
- Kaleb J – R&B singer-songwriter
- Kallula – electronic/pop singer, known for "No One Can Stop Us"
- Keenan Nasution – musician, singer-songwriter, producer
- Keisya Levronka – pop singer, actress

== L ==
- Lilis Suryani – singer
- Lyodra Ginting – pop singer and actress

== M ==
- Mahalini Raharja – singer
- Marshanda – pop/R&B female singer and actress
- Maudy Ayunda – female singer-songwriter and actress
- Melky Goeslaw – pop male singer
- Melly Goeslaw – pop/R&B/dance singer-songwriter, record producer
- Mike Mohede – Indonesian singer, winner of Indonesian Idol season 2
- Mimi Mariani – Indonesian traditional singer, actress
- Monica Karina – R&B/electronic singer
- Mulan Jameela – Indonesian pop singer and formerly of duo Ratu

== N ==
- Nadhif Basalamah – singer-songwriter, known for "Penjaga Hati"
- Nafa Urbach – Indonesian rock/dangdut singer
- Naura Ayu – Indonesian actress and singer
- Nicky Astria – Indonesian rock singer
- Nike Ardilla – Indonesian rock singer
- Niki – Indonesian R&B singer-songwriter
- Norazia – singer
- Novita Dewi – Indonesian pop/rock/gospel singer, grand champion of Astana International Song Festival 2005 in Kazakhstan

== O ==
- Once – pop singer

== P ==
- Pamungkas – male singer
- Pane Irma – pop female singer
- Pinkan Mambo – pop/R&B female singer. Formerly of duo Ratu
- Poppy Mercury – rock female singer
- Putri Ariani – pop singer-songwriter, Indonesia's Got Talent winner

== R ==
- Rainych – J-Pop/City Pop female singer
- Raisa Andriana – pop/R&B/soul/jazz female singer
- Rayssa Dynta – singer-songwriter, actress
- Revo Marty – pop/R&B/soul/jazz male singer
- Rhoma Irama – dangdut male singer-songwriter, musician, actor, politician; recognised as The King of Dangdut
- Rich Brian – Indonesian rapper
- Rini Wulandari – Indonesian pop/R&B singer, winner of Indonesian Idol season 4
- Rizky Febian – male pop, R&B, soul & jazz singer, songwriter, son of the comedian Sule
- Rossa – Indonesian pop/R&B/soul female singer and the most popular regional (Indonesia, Singapore, Malaysia) artist
- Ruth Sahanaya – pop/R&B/classic female singer

== S ==
- Sal Priadi – singer-songwriter
- Salma Salsabil – singer-songwriter, Indonesian Idol winner
- Salmah – actress and singer (1926–)
- Sandhy Sondoro – pop/adult contemporary male singer and winner of the 2009 International Contest of Young Pop Singer New Wave in Latvia
- Shae – singer, actress
- Shanty – female pop/R&B/soul/jazz singer, dancer and actress
- Sherina Munaf – female pop singer-songwriter and former most popular child star
- Sheryl Sheinafia – female pop/soul singer
- Syahrini – female pop singer, songwriter, actress and dancer

== T ==
- Tantowi Yahya – Indonesian country singer, TV presenter and member of Indonesian house of representative
- Terryana Fatiah – Indonesian pop female singer
- Tiara Andini – Indonesian pop female singer and actress, runner up Indonesian Idol season 10
- Tika – independent singer-songwriter
- Titi DJ – pop/R&B/soul female singer, Indonesian idol judge and former of Indonesian representative at Miss World 1983
- Titiek Puspa – pop singer
- Tulus – male pop, soul and jazz singer

== V ==
- Via Vallen – dangdut singer
- Vidi Aldiano – pop male singer (1990–2026)
- Vina Panduwinata – pop female singer

== W ==
- Wafda Saifan – pop singer
- Waljinah – keroncong singer

== Y ==
- Yuni Shara – pop female singer
- Yura Yunita – pop female singer

== See also ==
- Music of Indonesia
