= List of Indonesian musicians and musical groups =

This is a list of Indonesian musicians and musical groups from various genres.

== Other name ==
- /rif

== 0–9 ==
- 7icons — Girlband

== A ==
- A. Rafiq — Dangdut male singer
- Acha Septriasa — Pop female singer and actress
- ADA Band — Pop rock/alternative rock band
- Addie MS — Music composer, producer and conductor
- Afgan — Pop/R&B/soul male singer and actor
- Agnez Mo — Indonesian pop/R&B/soul singer/songwriter, dancer and actress
- Ahmad Albar — Rock musician and vocalist of God Bless
- Ahmad Band — Rock band whose led by Ahmad Dhani
- Ahmad Dhani — Rock singer/songwriter, composer and record producer who owner of label music Republik Cinta Management
- Amara — Soul/country singer and personnel of vocal group Lingua
- Andien — Jazz female singer
- Anggun — French singer/songwriter
- Anneth Delliecia — Pop female singer and actress
- Ari Lasso — Pop/rock solo singer who was ex-vocalist of Dewa 19
- Armageddon Holocaust — Old school black metal band
- Ashilla Zee — Pop/rock singer
- Ayu Ting Ting — Dangdut female singer
- Ariel - male singer, singer/songwriter, musician

== B ==
- Balawan — Jazz rock/traditional/fusion guitarist and double neck guitar virtuoso
- Barasuara
- Benyamin Sueb — Traditional male singer and actor of Betawi descent
- Bernadya — Indonesian female pop singer-songwriter
- Bimbo — Religious group vocals
- Bing Slamet — Indonesian singer, actor, and comedian
- Blink — Pop/jazz girlband
- Broery Marantika — Tenor male singer
- Bunga Citra Lestari — Pop singer and actress
- Burgerkill — Metalcore/death metal/metal core band who won 2013 Metal Hammer Golden Gods Awards in UK

== C ==
- Cakra Khan – Pop singer
- Camelia Malik — Dangdut female singer
- Cherrybelle — Pop girlband
- Chrisye — Pop/soul/progressive rock male singer
- Cinta Laura — Electropop female singer, dancer, and actress who had begun her debut international career (as actress) in United States
- Cita Citata — Dangdut female singer and actress
- Citra Scholastika — Pop/jazz female singer and actress who was selected as runner-up of Indonesian Idol of season 6
- CJR — Pop boyband
- Cokelat — Hard rock/alternative rock band who won the category of Favorite Artist (Indonesia) at the 2003 MTV Asia Awards

== D ==
- D'Cinnamons
- D'Masiv - Pop/rock singer
- Danilla Riyadi — Indie pop singer
- Dara Puspita — Indonesian flower generation girl group
- Deadsquad - Technical death metal band
- Detty Kurnia — Sundanese pop singer
- Dewa 19 — Indonesian rock band
- Dewa Budjana — Indonesian jazz/rock guitarist
- Dewi Lestari — Indonesian singer/songwriter and best selling author
- Dewi Persik — Dangdut singer
- Dewiq — Rock singer and songwriter
- Dewi Sandra — Pop/R&B singer, dancer, actress and model
- Didi Kempot — Campursari singer
- Dipha Barus
- Diskoria

== E ==
- Ebiet G Ade — Country/ballad/folk male singer
- Edane - Indonesian hard rock/heavy metal/alternative metal band
- Efek Rumah Kaca - Indie rock/alternative rock band
- Elvy Sukaesih — Dangdut female diva and known as Queen of Dangdut Indonesia
- Elwin Hendrijanto — Composer, producer, and pianist
- Emilia Contessa — Dangdut/Indo pop/keroncong female singer
- Eros Djarot — Pop male singer/songwriter
- Erwin Gutawa — Indonesian composer, songwriter, and bassist
- Eva Celia - Pop singer
- Evie Tamala — Dangdut female singer

== F ==
- Fatin Shidqia — Indonesian Pop Singer, winner of the first season of X Factor Indonesia
- Fariz RM — Indonesian Pop Music Maestro
- .Feast — Rock band
- Four Seasons - Indonesia's first mandarin band

== G ==
- Galdive
- Gesang — Keroncong musician
- Gigi — Rock band
- Glenn Fredly — Pop/R&B/jazz musician
- Gita Gutawa — Pop/classical female singer, she won The 6th International Nile Children Song Festival in Cairo
- God Bless — Hard rock group
- Gombloh — Pop singer and songwriter
- Gordon Tobing — Folk singer and songwriter
- Guruh Sukarnoputra — Musician/songwriter

== H ==
- Harmony Chinese Music Group
- Harry Roesli — Avant-garde musician
- Hellcrust
- Hindia
- HMGNC

== I ==
- Ian Antono — Indonesian guitarist and songwriter
- Ida Laila — Female dangdut singer
- Iis Dahlia — Female dangdut singer
- Ikke Nurjanah — Female dangdut singer
- Indahkus — Indo pop/C-Pop/K-Pop/J-Pop female musician, singer, songwriter, dancer, actress, host, and doctor
- Indra Lesmana — Jazz musician, singer, songwriter and record producer
- Indah Dewi Pertiwi — Indonesian pop singer, dancer, model
- Inul Daratista — Dangdut female singer
- Irma Pane — Pop female singer
- Irwansyah — Pop singer and actor
- Ismail Marzuki — Writer of patriotic songs
- Iwa K — Male rapper
- Iwan Fals — Folk/country/ballad male singer
- Isyana Sarasvati — Pop/RnB/jazz/soul female singer, pianist, and songwriter

== J ==
- James F. Sundah — Songwriter
- Jamrud — Hard rock/heavy metal band.
- Jikustik — Pop rock band
- JKT48 — Idol group, Indonesian sister band of Japanese AKB48
- Jockie Soerjoprajogo — Musician, keyboarder, and songwriter
- Joy Tobing — Winner of Indonesian Idol season 1
- J-Rocks — Rock band, but their put into Japanese style
- Judika - Rock/pop singer
- Julia Perez — Dangdut singer, actress, and model for FHM and Maxim France

== K ==
- Kahitna — Pop/jazz band
- Kangen Band
- Kekal — Heavy metal and electronic music band
- Kerispatih — Pop rock band
- Keisya Levronka — Pop female singer
- Koes Plus — One of Indonesia's earliest rock/pop band
- Koil — Industrial rock/heavy metal band
- Kotak — Pop/rock/hard rock band
- Krisdayanti — Pop/R&B female singer
- Killing Me Inside — Modern rock emo band
- Kunto Aji

== L ==
- Lilis Suryani
- Lingua - Indonesian vocal group
- Lesti Kejora - Female dangdut singer
- Letto - Indonesian pop band
- Lomba Sihir
- Lyodra Ginting - Indonesian pop singer

== M ==
- Mahalini — Pop female singer
- Maliq & D'Essentials — Jazz group
- Marshanda — Pop/R&B female singer and actress
- Mansyur S. — Dangdut male singer
- Marthino Lio
- Maudy Ayunda — Female singer/songwriter and actress
- Melitha Sidabutar — contemporary Christian music singer and songwriter
- Melky Goeslaw — Pop Male Singer
- Melly Goeslaw — Pop/R&B/dance singer/songwriter, record producer
- Meriam Bellina — Pop singer and actress
- Mike Mohede — Winner of Indonesian Idol season 2
- Mocca — Retro swing/jazz band
- Mulan Jameela — Pop singer and formerly of duo Ratu

== N ==
- Nadin Amizah
- Nafa Urbach — Indonesian rock/dangdut singer
- Naif — Rock band
- Nasida Ria — Qasidah modern group
- Naura Ayu — Indonesian pop singer
- Neonomora
- Netral — Indonesian rock/punk rock band
- Nicky Astria — Indonesian rock singer
- Nike Ardilla — Indonesian rock, pop rock, soft rock and pop metal singer
- Niki — R&B singer, record producer
- Nidji — Britpop/Pop rock band
- Noah — Alternative pop/rock band
- No Na — Indonesian girl group based in the United States
- Norazia — Funk/soul/pop singer
- Novita Dewi — Indonesian pop/rock/gospel singer, grand champion of Astana International Song Festival 2005 in Kazakhstan
- Nu Dimension — Indonesian boy band, 2nd runner-up of X Factor Indonesia first season
- Noven - The princess of November

== O ==
- Once — Rock singer

== P ==
- Padi — Alternative rock band, MTV Asia Awards 2002's winner on the category Most Favourite Indonesian Artist
- Pamungkas - Indonesian indie pop male singer
- Panbers — Pop/rock/spiritual/keroncong group
- Pasto-1 — Pop/rock/R&B group
- Pee Wee Gaskins — Rock/pop-punk band
- Pinkan Mambo — Pop/R&B female singer, formerly of duo Ratu
- Poppy Mercury - Indonesian pop rock, hard rock and soft rock singer
- Prilly Latuconsina — Pop female singer and actress
- Project Pop — Indonesian comedic group
- Purgatory — Heavy metal/nu metal band

== R ==
- Radja — Pop/rock band
- Rainych — J-Pop/City Pop female singer
- Ramengvrl
- Ratu — Female pop/R&B/rock duo
- RAN — Jazz/funk/hip-hop/pop group
- Rhoma Irama — Dangdut male singer/songwriter, musician, actor, politician. He recognised as The King of Dangdut Indonesia
- Rini Wulandari — Indonesian pop/RnB singer. Winner of Indonesian Idol season 4
- Rinto Harahap
- Rizky Febian — Male pop, RnB, soul & jazz singer, songwriter. He is the son of the comedian Sule
- Rossa — pop/R&B/soul female singer
- Ruth Sahanaya — Pop/R&B/classic female singer
- Raisa — Pop/R&B/soul/jazz female singer
- Rich Brian — Indonesian rapper/comedian

== S ==
- Sajama Cut — Indie rock band
- SambaSunda — Ethnic music fusion group
- Samsons — Pop rock band
- Sandhy Sondoro — Pop/adult contemporary male singer and winner of the 2009 International Contest of Young Pop Singer New Wave in Latvia
- Sari Simorangkir — contemporary Christian music singer and songwriter
- Seringai — Hardcore punk band
- Seventeen — Pop rock band
- Sheila on 7 — Pop rock/alternative rock band
- Sherina Munaf — Female pop singer/songwriter and former most popular child star
- Sheryl Sheinafia — Female pop/soul singer
- Siksakubur - Death metal band
- Siti Badriah — Female dangdut singer
- SIVIA
- Slamet Abdul Sjukur — Contemporary musician
- Slank — Rock/hard rock band
- SM*SH — Boyband
- Soimah Pancawati
- Sore — Indonesian rock revival/psychedelic pop band
- SOS — Girlband
- Raden Ajeng Srimulat — Keroncong singer
- ST 12 — Top Pop melayu band
- Stephanie Poetri
- Sule — Comedian and pop singer
- Superman Is Dead — Punk rock band
- Super Girlies
- Super 7 — Pop boyband
- Syahrini — Pop female singer/songwriter and actress

== T ==
- Tantowi Yahya — Indonesian well-known country singer, TV presenter and member of Indonesian house of representative
- Terry Shahab — Pop female singer
- Tiara Andini - Pop female singer and actress, runner up Indonesian Idol season 10
- Tielman Brothers — First Indonesian band
- Tika and The Dissidents - Indonesian indie pop
- Timothy Chooi– Indonesian-American Classical Violinist
- Tipe-X — Ska band
- Titi DJ — Pop/R&B/soul female singer, Indonesian representative at Miss World 1983
- Titiek Puspa — Pop female singer
- The Changcuters — Garage rock/rock & roll band
- The Panturas
- The S.I.G.I.T. — Garage rock/hard rock band
- Trees & Wild — Post-rock/folk band
- Tulus — Pop/soul/jazz male singer

== U ==
- Ungu — Pop/rock band
- UN1TY

== V ==
- Via Vallen — Dangdut/pop female singer
- Vidi Aldiano — Pop male singer
- Vina Panduwinata — Pop female singer

== W ==
- Wage Rudolf Supratman — Musician/songwriter, creator of Indonesia national anthem
- Wali — Pop creative, pop melayu, hard rock band
- Waljinah — Keroncong female singer
- Weird Genius — Electro-pop group
- West Java Syndicate — Ethnic-fusion group
- White Chorus
- White Shoes & The Couples Company — Rock/pop/jazz band

== Y ==
- Yana Julio — Pop jazzy male artist
- Yotari Kezia — independent singer and songwriter
- Yovie & Nuno — Pop band
- Yuni Shara — Pop female singer
- Yura Yunita — Pop female singer

== Z ==
- Zeke and the Popo — Psychedelic/folkrock/ambient band
- Ziva Magnolya
