= Dipha Barus =

Indonesian DJ, composer, and producer

- Born: Dipha Kresna Aditya Barus; 4 January 1986 (age 40); Jakarta, Indonesia
- Genres: EDM; house; dance; tropical house
- Occupations: DJ; composer; record producer; songwriter
- Years active: 2010–present
- Labels: Ultra Records; Pon Your Tone

Dipha Kresna Aditya Barus (born 4 January 1986) is an Indonesian DJ, composer, and record producer. He is regarded as a major figure in the Indonesian dance music scene and has been credited with stirring up an Indonesian EDM revolution. He became known to the public after releasing the single "No One Can Stop Us" featuring Kallula in 2016. In 2019, he signed with American label Ultra Records.

== Early life and education ==
Dipha Barus was born on 4 January 1986 in Jakarta, Indonesia. He started producing music at the age of twelve and was heavily influenced by drum and bass and artists like Aphex Twin. He was awarded a scholarship at the Berklee College of Music, but instead studied graphic design at Limkokwing University of Creative Technology in Malaysia. He started his career while in college, working as a semi-permanent DJ at Zouk Club in Kuala Lumpur.

== Career ==
=== Early career and Agrikulture (2010–2015) ===
In 2007, Barus began producing music with his electronic band, Agrikulture. Upon returning to Indonesia, he began performing at restaurants and community events, as techno music had a limited following at the time. He also started a YouTube channel called Sflogicninja, which was founded by David Earl in 2006, to share his work and build a following.

=== Breakthrough and AMI Awards (2016–2018) ===
Barus rose to fame in 2016 with the release of "No One Can Stop Us", a collaboration with singer Kallula. The tropical house-tinged track became a huge hit in Indonesia and won the Anugerah Musik Indonesia (AMI) Award for Best Dance Production/EDC category. The song also reached Spotify's Global Viral 50 chart.

In 2017, he released "All Good" featuring Nadin Amizah, which won the AMI Award for Best Collaborative Production. The track also entered Apple Music's Beats 1 playlist. That same year, he collaborated with Bunga Citra Lestari on a remake of the song "Aku Wanita", which was originally sung by Reza Artamevia. The song was included in BCL's third album, It's Me BCL. He also produced "Made in Jakarta" for singer Adrian Khalif, which served as Khalif's debut single.

In 2018, he won the AMI Award for Best Rap/Hip Hop Production for his song "Decide". He also released "Money Honey (Count Me In)" with Monica Karina and "My Kind of Crazy" with Raisa. Barus won a total of nine AMI Awards during this period.

=== Ultra Records (2019–present) ===
In 2019, Barus signed with Ultra Records, a world-renowned electronic music label based in New York City. His first release under the label was "You Move Me", a collaboration with R&B singer Monica Karina, which premiered on Billboard Dance.

In 2021, he released "Flower" featuring Jackie Castro. In 2024, he released "Surak", a modern house and dancefloor track featuring tropical percussion.

In January 2025, he released "BATARA", a collaboration with Jinan Laetitia that was inspired by a spiritual journey to Tanah Karo, his ancestral homeland. The track was first unveiled on the main stage of Djakarta Warehouse Project 2024. Later that year, he collaborated with Rossa on the mini album Asmara Dansa, reimagining classic Indonesian songs. In 2026, he collaborated with Hindia on the single "Nafas", which addressed the theme of generational trauma.

== Musical style and influences ==
Barus is known for fusing traditional Indonesian instrumentation and modern electronic beats. His music incorporates elements of tropical house, house, and dance music, often blending modern electronic sounds with ancient mysticism and Indonesian cultural elements. He has described his style as "Indonesian EDM", a term that reflects his commitment to incorporating local sounds into global dance music.

His songs have been played by major DJs including Tiësto, David Guetta, and Lost Frequencies. He has also remixed tracks for international artists such as Lauv, Dillon Francis, Charli XCX, Troye Sivan, Alan Walker, and AmPm.

== Awards and recognition ==
Barus has won multiple Anugerah Musik Indonesia (AMI) Awards, including consecutive wins from 2016 to 2021. He won a Breakthrough Record of the Year award in 2018. He has also won awards for Best Dance Production, Best Collaborative Production, and Best Rap/Hip Hop Production.

In 2019, he was signed by Ultra Records, one of the world's leading electronic music labels. His music has entered Spotify's Global Viral 50 chart and Apple Music's Beats 1 playlist.

== Discography ==
=== Singles ===
Year	Title	Featuring artist(s)	Label
2016	"No One Can Stop Us"	Kallula	Pon Your Tone
2017	"All Good"	Nadin Amizah	Pon Your Tone
2017	"Aku Wanita"	Bunga Citra Lestari	—
2017	"Made in Jakarta"	Adrian Khalif	—
2017	"Decide"	A. Nakaya, Matter Mos, Ramengvrl	Pon Your Tone
2018	"Money Honey (Count Me In)"	Monica Karina	Pon Your Tone
2018	"My Kind of Crazy"	Raisa	—
2019	"You Move Me"	Monica Karina	Ultra Records
2020	"Down"	CADE	Ultra Records
2021	"Flower"	Jackie Castro	Ultra Records
2021	"Flower (VIP Remix)"	—	Ultra Records
2024	"Surak"	—	Ultra Records
2025	"Batara"	Jinan Laetitia	Ultra Records
2025	"Peligrosa"	Emy Perez	Ultra Records
2026	"Nafas"	Hindia	—

=== Extended plays ===
- SURAK EP (2024, Ultra Records)

=== Production work ===
- Rossa – Asmara Dansa (2025, mini album)

== See also ==
- List of Indonesian musicians
- Ultra Records
- Anugerah Musik Indonesia
