= Tika and The Dissidents =

Indonesian band

TIKA and The Dissidents
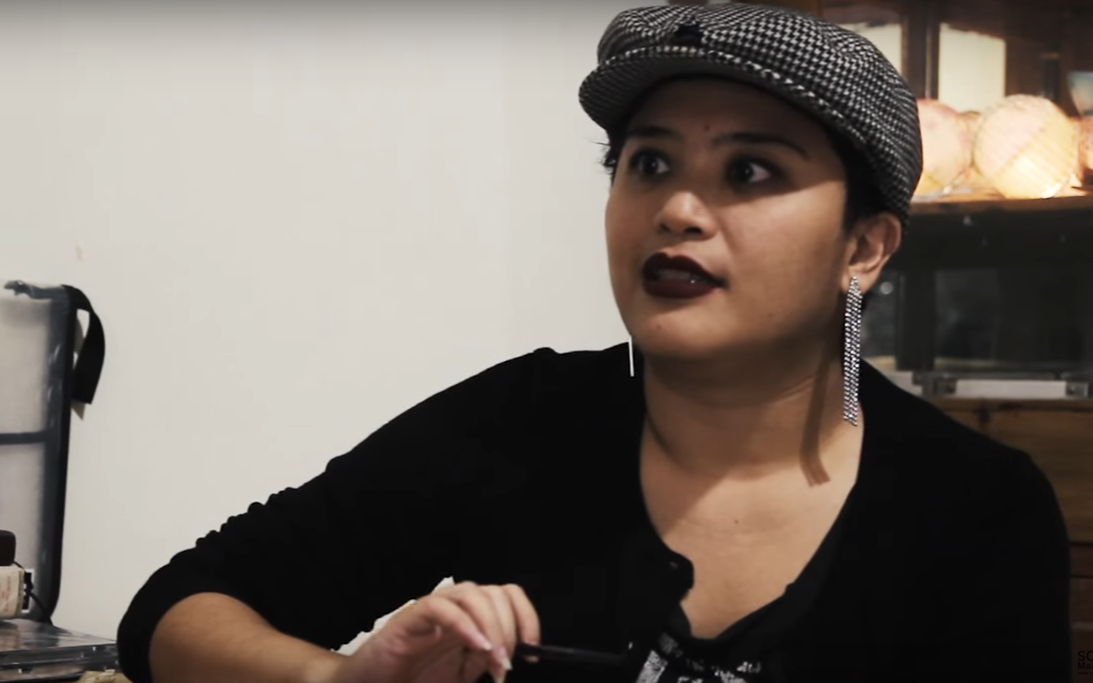
- Kartika Jahja in 2015

Background information
- Also known as: Tika
- Origin: Jakarta, Indonesia
- Genres: Rock; Blues; Waltz
- Years active: 2006–present
- Labels: The Head Records
- Members: Kartika Jahja; Susan Agiwitanto; Hertri Nur Pamungkas; Iga Massardi
- Past members: Luky Annash; Panji Gustiano; Okky Rahman Oktavian; Iman Fattah
- Website: http://www.suaratika.com

Tika & the Dissidents is an Indonesian band whose music includes elements from jazz, blues, tango, waltz to punk.

== History ==
Jakarta-born singer Kartika Jahja first released her own solo albums titled Frozen Love Songs (2005) and Defrosted Love Songs (2006) under Aksara Records. She then recruited Luky Annash (piano), Susan Agiwitanto (bass), Okky Rahman Oktavian (drums), and Panji Gustiano (guitar) to be her backup band. Along the way, the band became a significant part of the song-writing process.

In 2009, they first declared themselves as Tika and the Dissidents in the original soundtrack album of Joko Anwar’s film Pintu Terlarang. In the same year, the band parted ways with guitar player Panji Gustiano. A few months later they welcomed Iga Massardi as the newest member of the Dissidents.

After a two-year recording process, Tika and the Dissidents’ full-length album the Headless Songstress was released in July 2009 under the Head Records, a record label owned by the band.

Much to the band's surprise, the Headless Songstress received numerous praises from music fans and the media, both national and international. Tika and the Dissidents is said to be a breath of fresh air in the country's homogenous music industry. The pinnacle of the year was when TEMPO magazine awarded the album as "Album of the Year 2009" and the band as "2009’s Chosen Music Figure".

== Discography ==
=== Albums ===
- The Headless Songstress (2009)

=== Soundtracks ===
- Pintu Terlarang – “Home Safe” (Original Soundtrack – Lifelike Records, 2009)

== Personnel ==
- Kartika Jahja - Vocals
- Susan Agiwitanto - Bass
- Iga Massardi - Guitar
- Hertri Nur Pamungkas - Drums

== See also ==
- List of Indonesian musicians
