= Kallula =

- Born: Kallula Harsynta Esterlita; March 26, 1990 (age 36); Jakarta, Indonesia
- Other name: Kallula
- Occupations: Songwriter, singer
- Years active: 2010–present
- Spouse: Bam Mastro (m. 2022)
- Musical career
- Genres: Electropop
- Instrument: Vocals
- Label: Darlin's Record

Kallula Harsynta Esterlita (born 26 March 1990) is an Indonesian singer and songwriter. She is known as the vocalist of Kimokal.

== Career ==
Kallula was once the vocalist of LCDTrip. Afterwards, she met Rizky "Kimo" Ramadhan and formed the electronic music duos Kimokal in 2014 when LCDTrip was practicing at Double Deer Records Studio.

In 2016, disc jockey Dipha Barus invited her to collaborate on the song "No One Can Stop Us," which became a hit. In 2019, Kallula released her first solo song "This Love".

== Discography ==
=== Single ===
As a solo singer

Title	Year	Album
"This Love"	2019	—N/a
"Home Vacation"/"We Can Be Together" (with Bam Mastro)	2020	—N/a

As a supporting artist

Title	Year	Album
"HeyBeb!" (KunoKini featuring Kallula)	2016	—N/a
"No One Can Stop Us" (Dipha Barus featuring Kallula)	2016	—N/a

=== Non-single appearance ===
Title	Year	Other artists	Album
"Keep It Running"	2016	Elephant Kind and Neonomora	City J
"Feel It"	2016	Elephant Kind and Neonomora	City J
"Closer"	2016	Kimo	Muara
"Pillow Talk"	2017	Arrio	In Time

=== Other contributions ===
Title	Year	Performers	Album	Credit as
"All Good"	2017	Dipha Barus featuring Nadin	—N/a	Songwriter
"Money Honey (Count Me In)"	2018	Dipha Barus featuring Monica Karina	—N/a	Songwriter
"Evaluasi"	2019	Hindia	Menari dengan Bayangan	Songwriter
"Haluan"	2019	Barasuara	Pikiran dan Perjalanan	Additional vocals

== Awards and nominations ==
Year	Award	Category	Penerima	Hasil	Ref.
2016	Anugerah Musik Indonesia	Dance Production Work/Best Electronic	"No One Can Stop Us" (with Dipha Barus)	Won	
