= Remy Sylado =

Indonesian writer, actor and musician (1945–2022)

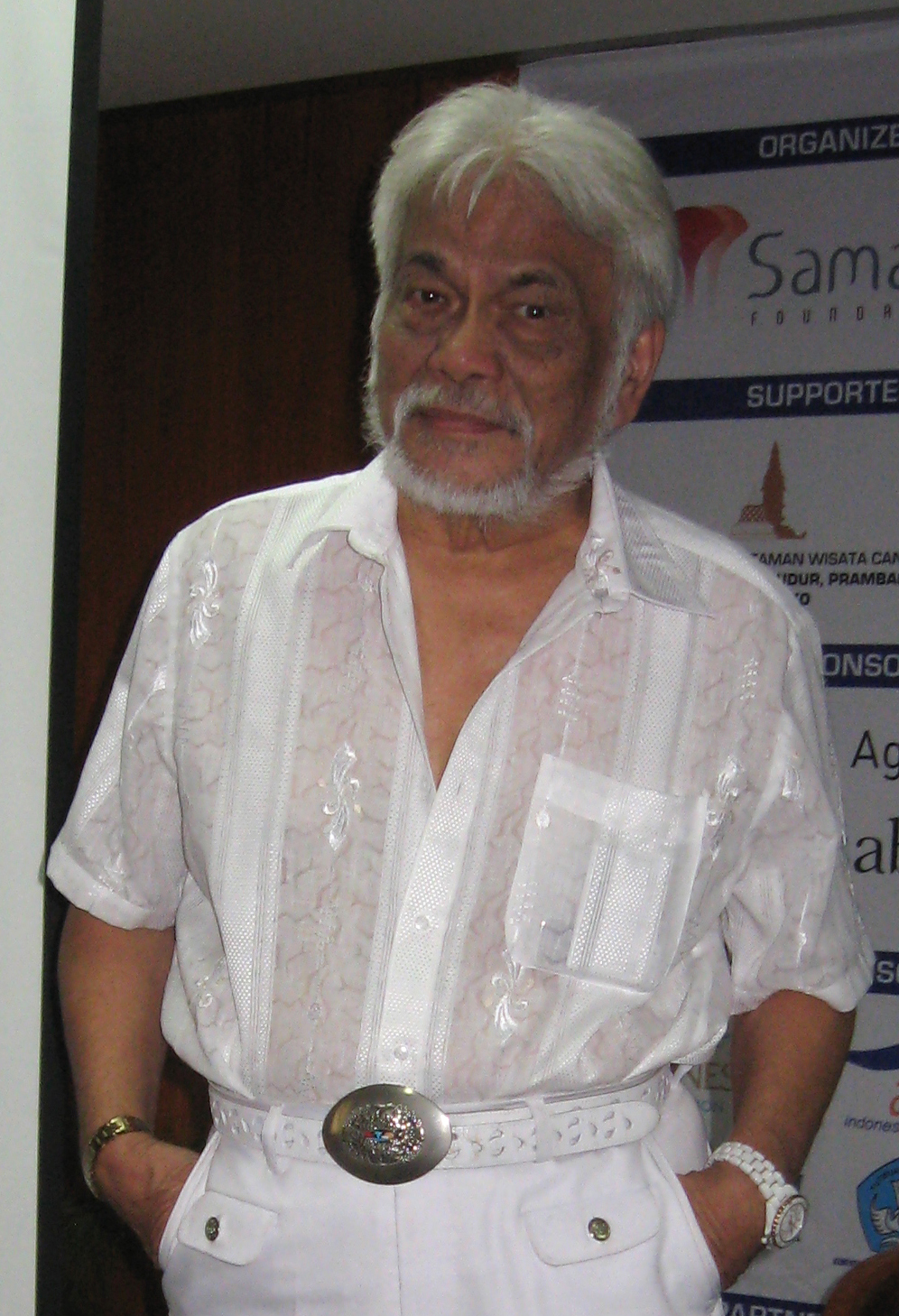
- Sylado at the 2013 Borobudur Writers Festival
- Born: Yapi Panda Abdiel Tambayong; 12 July 1945; Makassar, Japanese-occupied Dutch East Indies
- Died: 12 December 2022 (aged 77); Jakarta, Indonesia
- Occupations: actor; musician
- Writing career
- Language: Indonesian
- Period: 1970s–2022

Yapi Panda Abdiel Tambayong (12 July 1945 – 12 December 2022), best known by his pen-name Remy Sylado, was an Indonesian author, actor, and musician. Owing to his wide interests, in a 1999 article The Jakarta Post termed him "a walking encyclopedia of arts and humanities".

== Name ==
Born Yapi Panda Abdiel Tambayong, Sylado was known by a variety of pseudonyms. His most common one, Remy Sylado, was taken from the opening notes of the Beatles song "And I Love Her", which are rendered as "Re Mi Si La Do" in solfège, or in numbers as 23761; that number, according to Sylado, also represented the date of his first kiss: 23 July 1961. Sylado also published work under the pennames Dova Zila, Alif Danya Munsyi, and Juliana C. Panda.

== Biography ==
Sylado was born in Makassar, South Sulawesi, on 12 July 1945. His father, Johannes Tambayong, was an evangelist, though he also composed music. He moved to Semarang, Central Java, at a young age, studying in elementary school there. From a young age he showed an interest in theatre, writing his first stage dramas while still in junior high school. His early education was entirely in Catholic schools, though after secondary school he began to study in schools for the theatrical arts in Surakarta and Jakarta.

By the early 1960s Sylado had become a reporter with the Semarang-based daily Tempo, becoming that publication's editor-in-chief by 1965. In the 1970s he lived in Bandung, managing the magazine Aktuil whilst teaching at the Bandung Academy of Cinematography. He made his first foray into the film industry in 1973, handling the music for Frans Totok Ars' Pelarian; he wrote two further films, Duo Kribo (1977) and Ombaknya Laut Mabuknya Cinta (1978), by the end of the decade. In 1976 he married Maria Louise.

By the late 1970s Sylado was known for his poetry, which he termed mbeling: critical yet humorous, even cheeky. According to the literary critic Sapardi Djoko Damono, "Many poets have been inspired by the mbeling idea; it broke the conventions of poetry that existed then." In his spare time Sylado began writing novels, publishing his first—Gali Lobang Gila Lobang—in 1977. Sylado moved to Jakarta in the early 1980s and established his own theatrical troupe, with some of the actors taken from that of W. S. Rendra.

By the 1980s Sylado's musical work had been featured on 13 different albums, some songs with Sylado providing vocals, others with other musicians. His songs tended to gravitate towards folk music. Musician Harry Roesli studied under him. He began his film acting career in 1986, with Eduart P Sirait's Tinggal Sesaat Lagi. By 1992 he had acted in another five films, later acting in television serials.

In 1999 Sylado published the novel Ca Bau Kan (The Courtesan), which dealt with the trials and tribulations of Chinese Indonesians in pre-independence Indonesia. In 2001 Nia Dinata adapted the novel for her first feature film. Entitled Ca-bau-kan, the movie was critically panned, though Dinata was satisfied. Between 1999 and 2007 Sylado wrote an average of two novels yearly.

Sylado died on 12 December 2022, aged 77, after a lengthy hospitalisation at Tarakan General Hospital, Jakarta.

Sylado was well known for wearing exclusively white. He was known to research his novels in great detail, going to the Netherlands to research his 2003 novel Paris van Java. Despite this, and using typewriters instead of computers (writing drafts by hand), Sylado usually completes his work quickly, often in less than three months.

== Awards and nominations ==
Sylado received multiple awards and nominations for his writing, acting, and music, including the 2002 Khatulistiwa Award for his novel Kerudung Merah Kirmizi and three nominations for the Citra Award for Best Supporting Actor.

== Works cited ==
- Anwar, Joko E.H. (23 June 2002). "Nia Dinata: A vow to make 'mature' films". The Jakarta Post. Archived from the original on 4 March 2016.
- "Filmografi Remy Sylado" [Filmography for Remy Sylado]. filmindonesia.or.id (in Indonesian). Konfiden Foundation. Archived from the original on 5 March 2016.
- "For Remy Sylado, 23761 are the Magic Notes". The Jakarta Post. 6 June 1999. Archived from the original on 4 March 2016.
- Junaidi, A. (27 March 2008). "Remy Sylado: Bringing social issues to the stage". The Jakarta Post. Archived from the original on 4 March 2016.
- Loka, Emanuel Dapa (25 July 2007). "Remy Sylado: Churning out works with typewriters". The Jakarta Post. Archived from the original on 4 March 2016.
- Medita, Aendra (12 July 2003). "Harry popularizes experimental music". The Jakarta Post. Archived from the original on 4 March 2016.
- "Penghargaan Remy Sylado" [Awards for Remy Sylado]. filmindonesia.or.id (in Indonesian). Konfiden Foundation. Archived from the original on 6 March 2016.
- Permana, Rakhmad Hidayatulloh (12 December 2022). "Sastrawan Remy Sylado Meninggal Dunia" [Literati Remy Sylado dies]. Detik (in Indonesian).
- "Remy Sylado" (in Indonesian). Taman Ismail Marzuki. Archived from the original on 25 August 2013.
- "Remy Sylado". filmindonesia.or.id (in Indonesian). Konfiden Foundation. Archived from the original on 7 April 2014.
- "Remy wins Khatulistiwa Literary Award". The Jakarta Post. 27 October 2002. Archived from the original on 4 March 2016.
- Sertori, Trisha (28 April 2011). "Nia Dinata: Embracing freedom of expression". The Jakarta Post.
