= Didi Kempot =

Indonesian singer and songwriter (1966–2020)

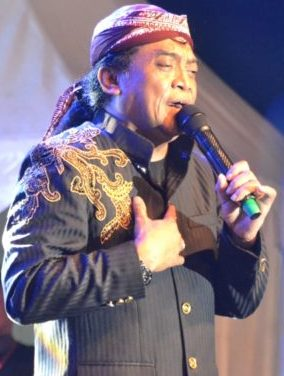
- Didi performing in Purbalingga, on 21 December 2019

Background information
- Born: Didik Prasetyo; 31 December 1966; Surakarta, Indonesia
- Died: 5 May 2020 (aged 53) Surakarta, Indonesia
- Genres: Campursari
- Occupations: Singer; songwriter
- Instrument: Vocals

Didi Kempot (born Didik Prasetyo; Javanese: ꦝꦶꦝꦶꦏ꧀ꦥꦿꦱꦼꦠꦾ, Dhidhik Prasetyå; 31 December 1966 – 5 May 2020) was an Indonesian singer and songwriter in the campursari style. He wrote some 700 songs, mainly in his native Javanese language. Apart from Indonesia, Didi was also popular in Suriname and the Netherlands, both of which have significant Javanese diaspora population.

== Personal life ==
Didi was born in Surakarta, Indonesia in 1966. Didi's father, Ranto Edi Gudel, was a comedian and singer-songwriter who often performed at the traditional ketoprak tobong theatrical stage. His brother Mamiek Prakoso was also a comedian. According to his brother Eko Gudel, Didi's childhood was full of misbehaviour and often fighting. After dropping out of Junior High School in Surakarta, Didi then moved to his uncle's house in Samarinda but his school there was not successful either. He then returned to his hometown to start busking.

== Early career ==
He started working as a street busker in his hometown between 1984 and 1986 before moving to Jakarta. According to him, when he arrived in Jakarta to pursue a career in music, he and eight of his friends slept in a narrow room for Rp15,000 per month. He said that the room was so narrow that they "sometimes could only sleep on their side [because of the lack of space]." The name "Kempot", which is a portmanteau of Kelompok Penyanyi Trotoar (Sidewalk Singer Group), was also coined in Jakarta.

Didi said that at the time, they did not earn enough money to save, because every time they earned some amount, the money would be spent on drinks. However, this period was a productive time as he wrote many songs, including "We Cen Yu", "Cidro" (Broken), "Moblong-Moblong" (Perforated), "Lerteler Meneh" (Drunk Again) and "Podo Pintere" (Equally Smart). According to Didi, these songs were popular among fellow buskers, even though he had not yet released them officially. This convinced him to continue pursuing a music career. After busking, Didi usually found time to record songs using blank tapes and tape recorders. When a song had been recorded, Didi handed it directly to various recording studios as a demo. Didi recounted that often the tape only got so far as the security desk. Some of the labels Didi applied for were MSC Plus and Musica Studios.

Musica Studios eventually called Didi because they were interested in his demo tape. Didi was then assisted by Pompi Suradimansyah, a member of the band No Koes, in arranging music. Slowly but surely, the comedic song "We Cen Yu" which was lined up as a single, became popular with the public, especially in Jakarta. Didi was offered to make a music video to be aired on TVRI, the only nationwide television channel at that time. This was also his first time to appear on the screen. In 1989, he released the single "Cidro" ("Broken"), which did not immediately become popular at the time. The song's theme did not fit the mainstream comedic, funny songs along the lines of "Jika Bulan Bisa Ngomong" ("If Only the Moon Could Speak") by Doel Sumbang. Moreover, the campursari style employed by Didi was not popular in the 1980s; Musica lumped him together with other Javanese pop singers.

== Concerts in the Netherlands and Suriname ==
Although "Cidro" had no success in Indonesia at the time of its release, it was a hit in the Netherlands and Suriname, two countries that have a significant Indonesian diaspora, especially those of Javanese descent. Didi then was invited to hold a concert there. In 1993, Didi left for the Netherlands. When he arrived in the Netherlands, Didi was surprised that many memorized "Cidro".

He returned to the Netherlands in 1996 and also toured Suriname. In the South American country, Didi was even more famous among the many native people and Javanese descendants there. From 1996 to 1998, he recorded 10 albums which were only released in the Netherlands and Suriname, such as Layang Kangen, Trimo Ngalah, and Suket Teki. In total Didi performed in Netherlands twice and in Suriname 11 times, the latest being the Layang Kangen Tour in 2018 when he received an award from President Dési Bouterse.

== Success in Indonesia ==
In the 1990s, Didi released the songs "Sewu Kutho" ("A Thousand Cities") and "Stasiun Balapan" ("Balapan Station"), which became hits in Indonesia. Didi's fame in his home country rose after his album Stasiun Balapan (1999) exploded in the market. Print and electronic media began covering Didi. He paced to various television stations for album promos. The success of the Stasiun Balapan album led Didi to record a second album titled Modal Dengkul. Other albums he released in early 2000s are Tanjung Mas Ninggal Janji, Seketan Ewu, Plong (2000), Ketaman Asmoro (2001), Poko'e Melu (2002), Cucak Rowo (2003), Jambu Alas with Nunung Alvi (2004) and Ono Opo (2005).

His popularity briefly waned with the turn of the century, but in the 2010s he regained his prominence especially among younger people. According to music researcher Irfan R. Darajat from Laras Studies of Music in Society, the rise of Didi was part of a recent effort of "hipster-washing" to raise up music that was previously considered "uncool", such as dangdut and qasidah. The rooting, site-specific, exclusivity of Didi's heartbreak songs in Javanese fits with the hipster-washing pattern. However, he added that Didi's rise to mainstream fame should not make him to be seen "[…] weird, cult-like, kitsch or whatever and make Didi’s music seem like something exotic."

In April 2020, he streamed a live charity concert from his house and raised a total Rp7.6 billion (~$500,000) to help Indonesians affected by the COVID-19 pandemic. He also released a song entitled "Ojo Mudik" ("Don't Go Mudik"), pleading his fans not to go back home during the Eid al-Fitr holiday season to prevent further spread of the coronavirus.

== Style ==
Didi worked in a campursari (a Javanese word meaning "mixture of essences") style, producing ballads with influences of pop music and the local styles kroncong and dangdut. The vast majority of his songs are themed around heartbreaks and other sad love stories. Because of this, he earned the nickname "The Godfather of the Broken-Hearted" during his later years. Aldo Sianturi of Billboard Indonesia writes that he is a "genius music conceptor" who are able to express the "depth and bitterness of love" in his lyrics, which are mostly written in Javanese, specifically the low ngoko register which is used as the daily speech by most Javanese speakers.

== Death ==
Didi died of complications from cardiac arrest on 5 May 2020 in Surakarta. He is survived by his wife Yan Vellia and two children.
