= Tika (singer) =

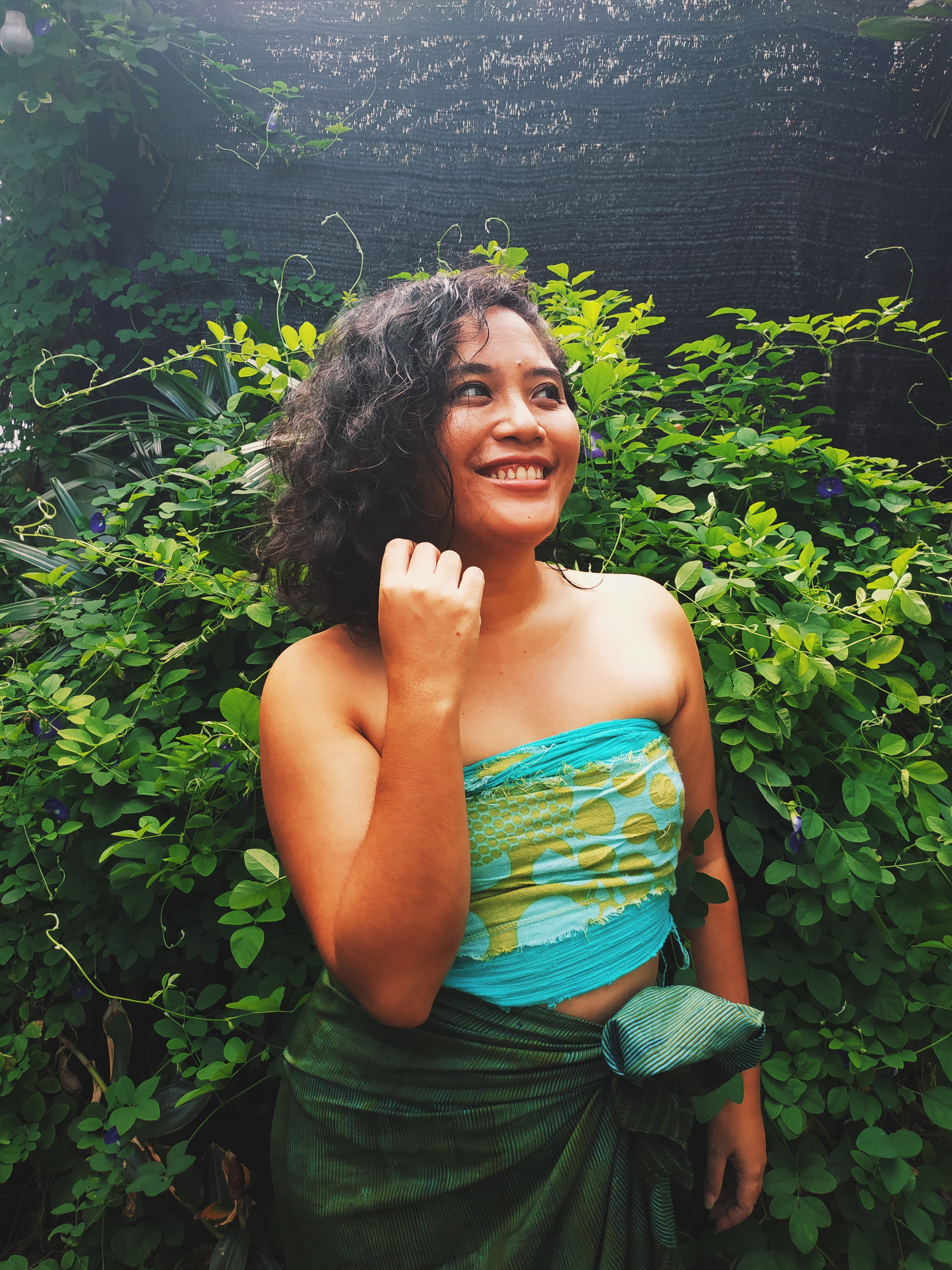
- Jahja in 2022
- Born: Kartika Jahja; 19 December 1980 (age 45); Jakarta, Indonesia
- Other name: Tika
- Occupations: Singer; songwriter; activist

Kartika Jahja (born 19 December 1980), better known as Tika, is an independent singer and songwriter with the band Tika and The Dissidents. She is also an author, actress, entrepreneur, and activist on gender and sexuality issues. In November 2016, she made the "BBC 100 Women" list.

== Early life ==
Jahja was born in Jakarta, Indonesia, on 19 December 1980. She holds a degree from the Art Institute of Seattle.

== Activism ==
Her songs have always featured political themes, but Jahja's involvement in activism became more focused on issues of gender and sexuality in 2013. She organized the Indonesian chapter of the global movement One Billion Rising with fellow activists. That same year, she came out about being a survivor of sexual violence, resulting in many women joining her publicly to share similar experiences. Jahja took time off from music to become a social caretaker for victims of gender-based violence from 2013 to 2015. In August 2015, she and Dr. Rebekah Moore founded the Yayasan Bersama Project, a foundation aimed at promoting gender justice through the mediums of music, arts, and pop culture. Tika is also an active member of the female collectives Kolektif Betina and Mari Jeung Rebut Kembali.

== Other careers ==
Jahja is an entrepreneur, writer, and actress. She owns a café called KEDAI, which has an interior made of recycled materials. The café is dedicated to promoting local Indonesian coffee, and has been featured in publications such as CNN.

As a freelance writer, her pieces have been published in several print media outlets in Indonesia and other countries. From 2009 to 2011, she had a weekly column named Street Smart in The Jakarta Post.

Jahja has also starred in feature films directed by Paul Agusta and Joko Anwar and in a theatre production titled SUBVERSIF, which was an adaptation of Ibsen's Enemy of The State.

== Discography ==
=== Albums ===
- Frozen Love Songs (2005)
- Defrosted Love Songs (2006)
- The Headless Songstress (2009)
- MERAH (2016)

=== Compilations ===
- Thank You and Good Night Mother – "Saddest Farewell" (Original Soundtrack – Green Studio, 2005)
- 9 Naga – "Asa" (Original Soundtrack – Warner Music Indonesia, 2005)
- Berbagi Suami – "Bengawan Solo" (Original Soundtrack – Aksara Records, 2006)
- Mesin Waktu: Teman-Teman Menyanyikan Lagu Naif – "Dia Adalah Pusaka Seluruh Umat Manusia Yang Ada di Seluruh Dunia" (A Tribute Compilation – Aksara Records, 2007)
- Seruan Indonesia – "Mayday" (Indonesian artists in support of Make Trade Fair, 2007)
- Dead Time: Kala – "Manderlay" (Original Soundtrack – Black Morse Records, 2007)
- Pintu Terlarang – "Home Safe" (Original Soundtrack – Lifelike Records, 2009)

=== Collaborations ===
- Dawai Damai – Agrikulture- "New Day" (Aquarius Musikindo, 2007)

== Filmography ==
- Anniversary Gift (2008)
- Pintu Terlarang (2009)
- At the Very Bottom of Everything (2009)
- SUBVERSIF (2014)
