= West Java Syndicate =

Indonesian ethnic-fusion music group in Bandung

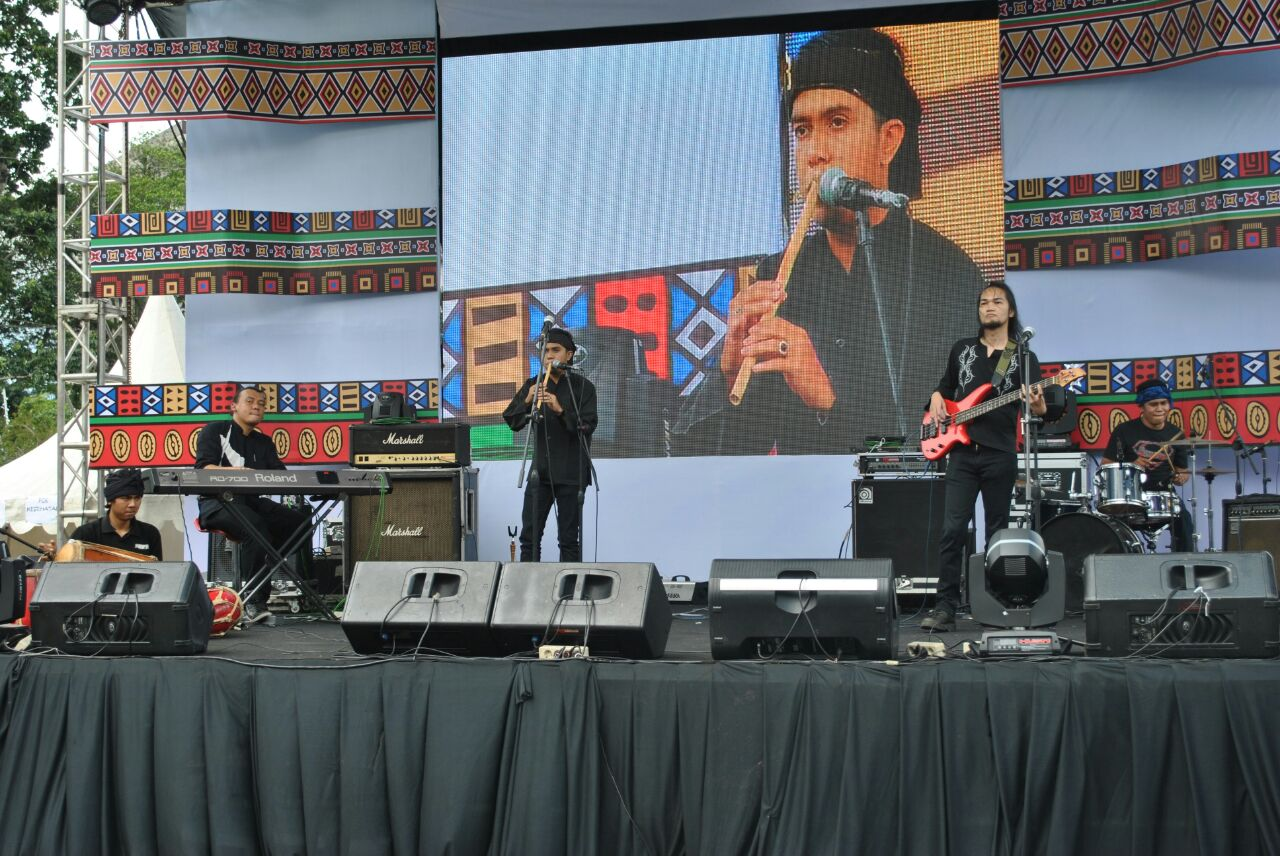
- West Java Syndicate at Asian African Carnival 2015

Background information
- Origin: Bandung, Indonesia
- Genres: World Music, Jazz Rock, Fusion
- Years active: 2010 – present
- Members: Zahar Mustilaq; Dede SP; YD Nafis; Randy Gevenk; IpinZbet
- Past members: Zinner, Dosenk, Asep Hadiat
- Website: westjavasyndicate.com

West Java Syndicate is an Indonesian ethnic-fusion music group founded in 2010 in Bandung, Indonesia. The group seeks to promote a wide variety of world music based on Sundanese music using traditional Sundanese musical instruments, as well as exploring contemporary styles.

== History ==
West Java Syndicate came alive in 2010 by Zahar Mustilaq, the drummer who actually live in between two spheres, the Sundanese traditional and the modern western music like jazz, blues, rock and so on. He then asked rock bass player Dede SP to form a group with a touch of Indonesian sundanese traditional music. Dede then invited his old college friend, keyboardist/pianist YD Nafis. SambaSunda's Zinner then join the team as well.

Their very first public performance was in a monthly jazz event in Bandung called Sunday Jazz at Potluck . Zinner left the group in the middle of 2011, and then Dosenk came up as replacement.

In early 2013 they went to studio for a recording session. The line-up for the recording was Zahar Mustilaq, Dede SP and YD Nafis on modern instrument section, and traditional section was Dosenk on Suling and Kendang, Asep Hadiat on Kendang, and Ludy Heryanto on Rebab and Tarompet. The recording result is an EP titled “Albeum Leutik” (Sundanese for Mini Album), released worldwide in November 2013

== Members ==
- Drums
  - Zahar Mustilaq (2010 – present)
- Bass
  - Dede SP (2010 – present)
- Keyboard
  - YD Nafis (2011 – present)

- Woodwind
  - Randy Gevenk (2014 – present)
- Kendang
  - Zinner (2010-2011)
  - Dosenk (2011-2014)
  - Asep Hadiat (2012-2014)
  - IpinZbet (2014–present)
- Other instruments
  - Ludy Heryanto (2013)

== Discography ==
=== Album ===
- Bubuka - 2017

=== EP ===
- Albeum Leutik - 2013

=== Singles ===
- Tembang Katresna - 2013
- Gending Rame ku Kendang - 2013
