= Doel Sumbang =

Indonesian singer and songwriter (born 1963)

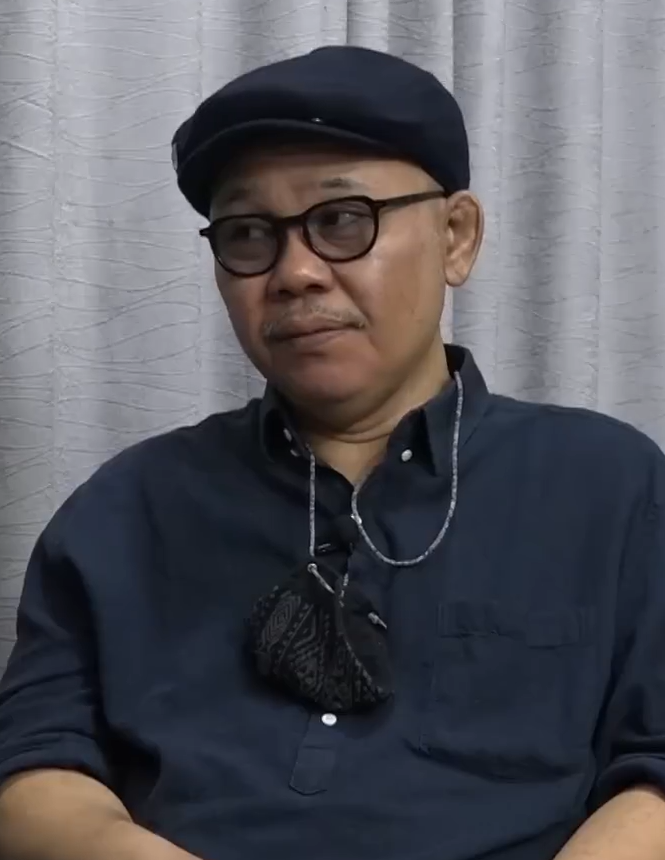
- Doel in 2021

Background information
- Born: Abdoel Wachyoe Affandi; May 16, 1963 (age 63)
- Origin: Bandung, West Java, Indonesia
- Genres: Pop kreatif, pop sunda, satire, comedy, pop rock, alternative rock, dangdut
- Occupations: Singer; songwriter; musician; composer; guitarist; actor
- Years active: 1981–present
- Labels: Blackboard, Nirwana Record, Universal Music Indonesia, EMI

Abdoel Wachyoe Affandi (EYD: Abdul Wahyu Affandi; Sundanese: ᮃᮘ᮪ᮓᮥᮜ᮪ ᮝᮠᮡᮥ ᮃᮖ᮪ᮖᮔ᮪ᮓᮤ; born May 16, 1963), known professionally as Doel Sumbang (EYD: Dul Sumbang; Sundanese: ᮓᮥᮜ᮪ ᮞᮥᮙ᮪ᮘᮀ), is an Indonesian pop musician and singer, known for his vulgarity and critics through playful melodies and comedic lyrics. Doel is also known as a Sundanese musician, writing and singing songs in the Sundanese pop genre about Sundanese social life.

== Name ==
He began his career in musical theatre in Braga Street, Bandung. During his theatrical career, he met Remy Sylado, where he got the nickname Doel, a shortening of his first name, Abdoel. He got his nickname Sumbang (discordant, breaking customs) from Handoko Kusmo, from his vulgar, colloquial, straightforward, and unpleasant lyrics, often times disregarding politeness and customs, saying things as is.

== Early life ==
Born in Bandung, he was raised in an Islamic household, his father was an Islamic teacher (mubalig). He came from a lineage of artisans, his grandfather was a violinist and his father was an actor at the Cultural Center Foundation. He has shown interest in art since middle school, especially in theatre and music, studying from Remy Sylado.

== Career ==
During his theatre career, he began writing song lyrics with themes of social criticism and issues. His simple and straightforward lyrics attracted the attention of a producer named Handoko Kusmo, interested in recording Doel's works. His dedication to music caused a conflict between him and his father, he was kicked out of his house and was forced to live in the streets of Braga Street during the making of his first album. Originally, he often appeared in local shows. His critical songs against the Orba (New Order) government has led one of his songs to be temporarily banned in the 1970s.

In the 1980s, Doel began writing ballad songs, both about love and social critics. In the 90s, he released his duet album with Nini carlina "Kalau Bulan Bisa Ngomong" (If Only The Moon Could Speak), which further pushed him to fame.
