= Salmah =

Indonesian actress (born 1926)

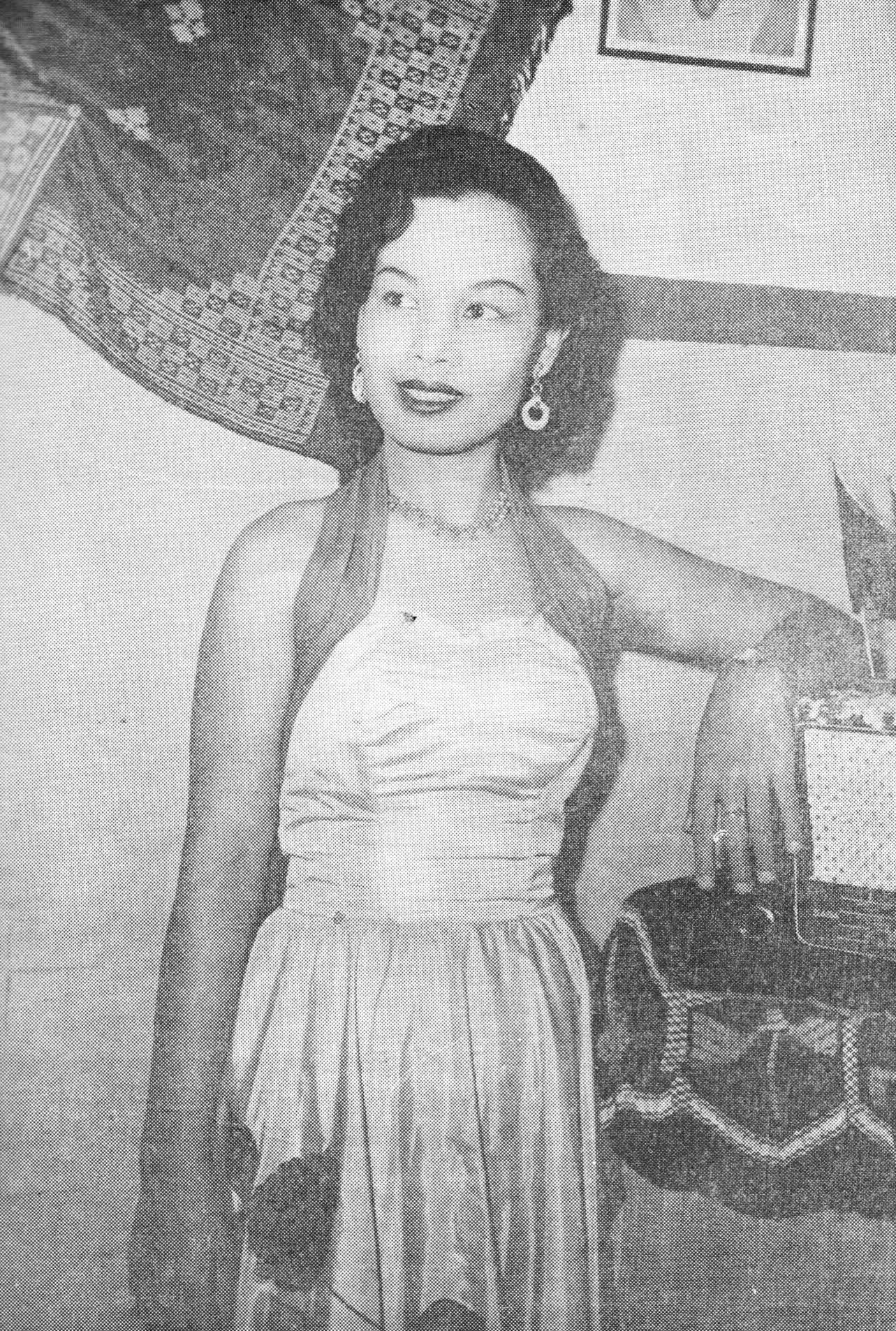
- Salmah in 1954
- Born: Nji Siti Salmah; 6 June 1926; Buitenzorg (now Bogor), Dutch East Indies
- Occupations: Actress; singer
- Years active: 1942–1959, 1973–1977
- Spouse: Eddy Jono (m. 1946; sep. 1954)

Nji Siti Salmah (born 6 June 1926) is an Indonesian actress and singer whose career spanned the 1940s to the 1970s. Her varied career spanned film, stage, and radio. She was the part of Classical Indonesian Cinema.

== Early life ==
Nji Siti Salmah was born on 6 June 1926 in Buitenzorg, Dutch East Indies, as the youngest of five children from a Sundanese farmer family, and was raised in Tjiandjoer.

== Personal life ==
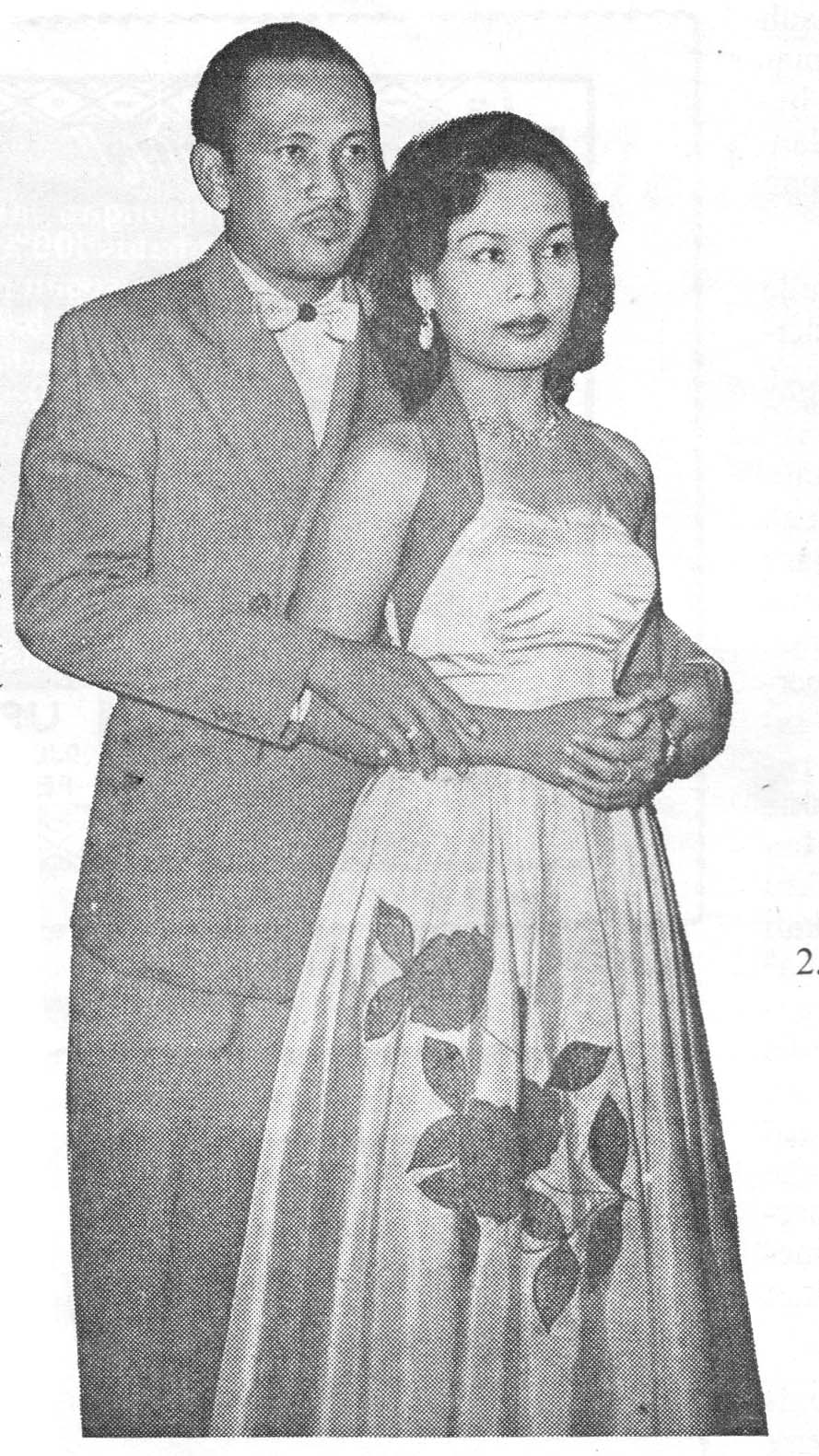
Salmah with her husband in 1954

Salmah was married to Eddy Jono, an employee of PELNI, in 1946, and has one child. The couple separated in November 1954. In March 1955, Salmah resided in Kebon Kosong, Kemayoran, while Jono resided in Jatinegara.

== Career ==
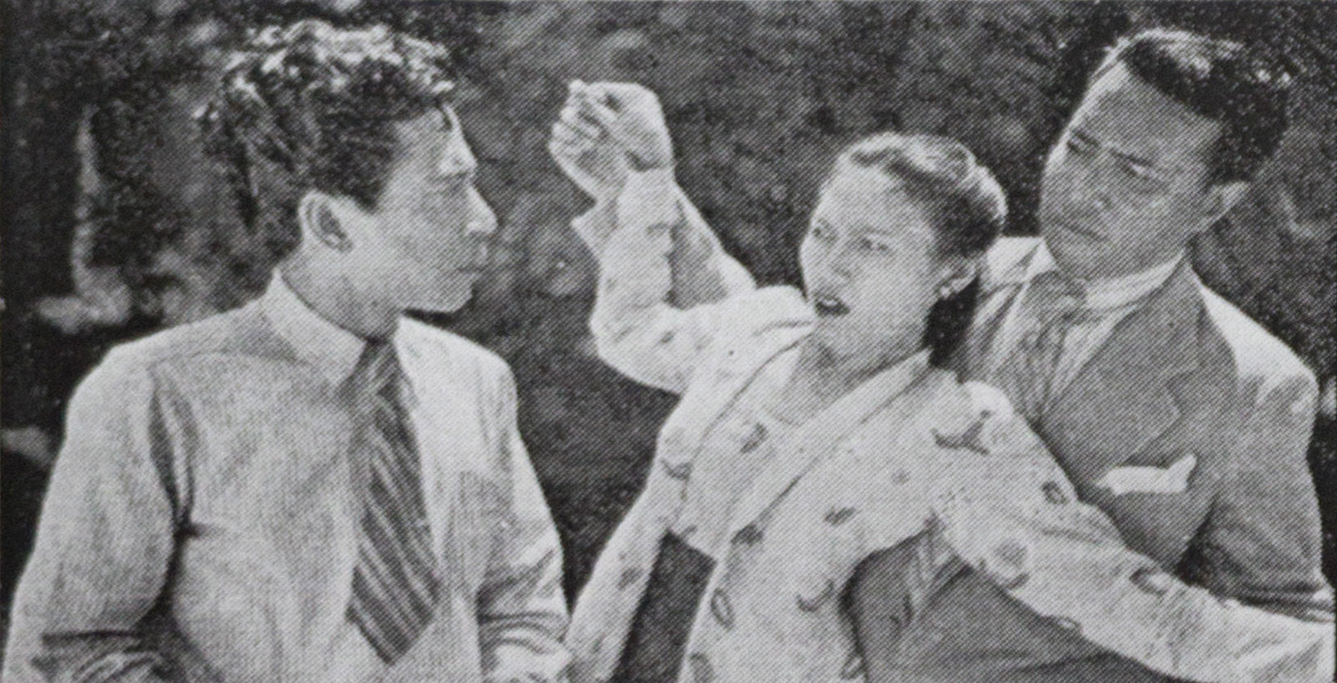
Salmah in a scene from Tirtonadi (1950)

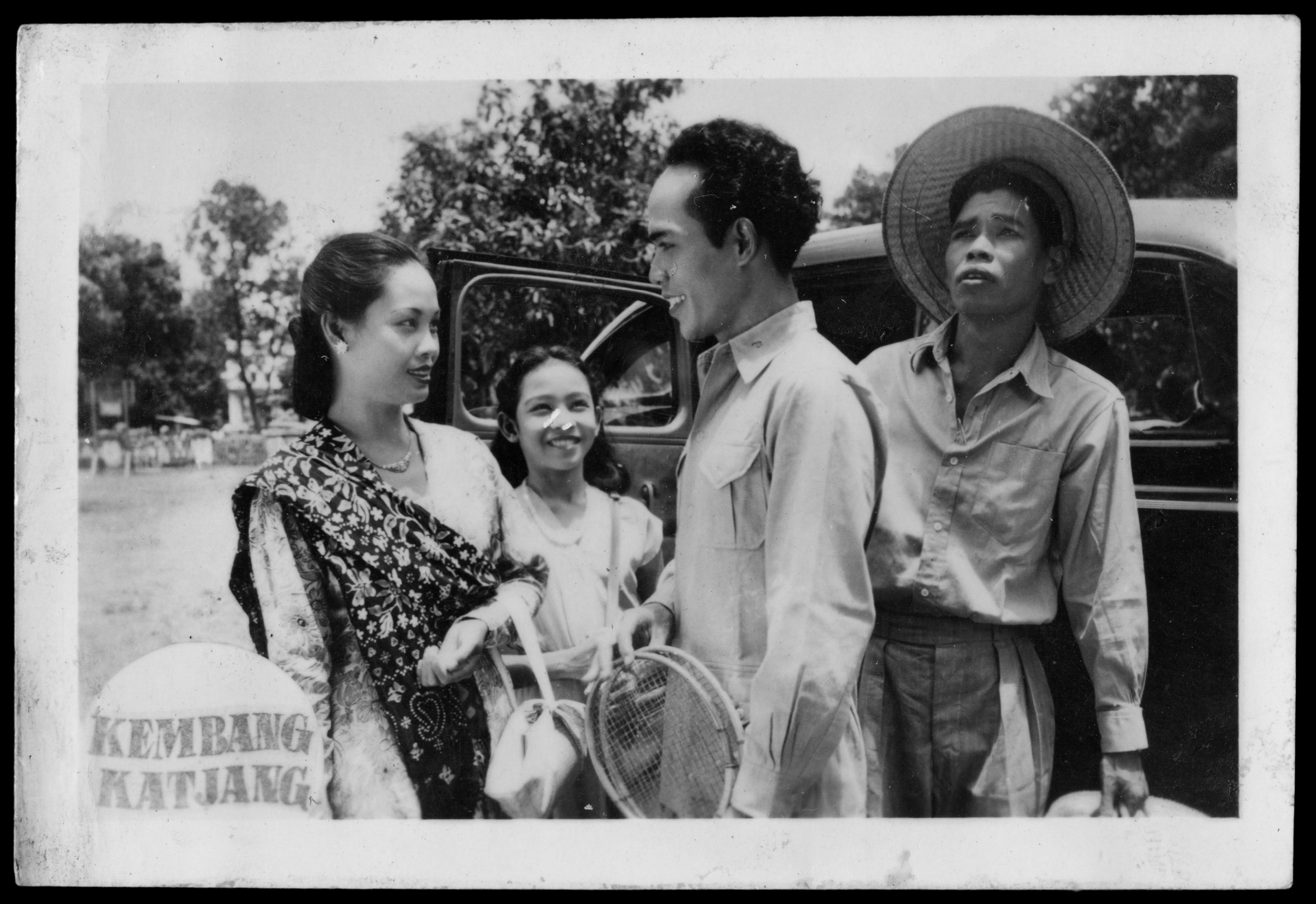
Salmah in a promotional still from Kembang Katjang (1950)

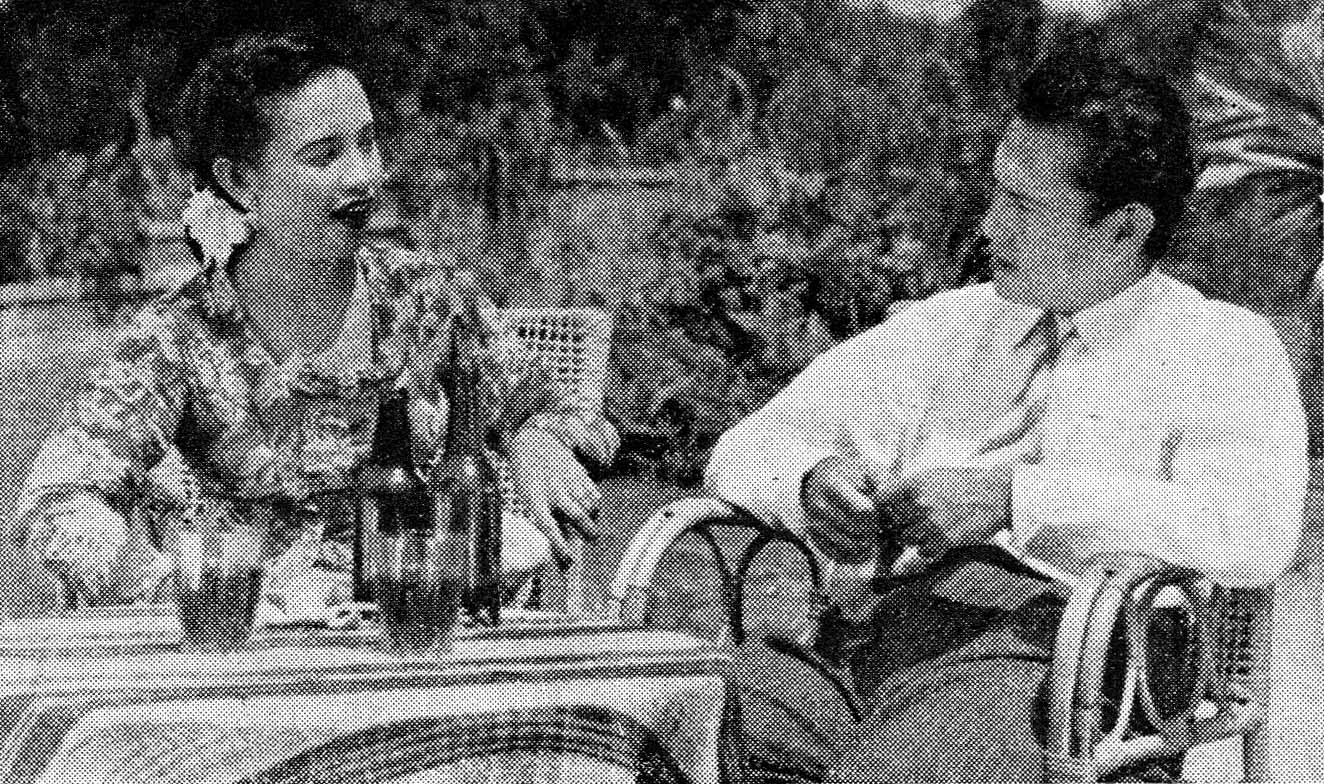
Salmah with Amran S. Mouna in a scene from Djandjiku Djandjimu (1954)

Salmah started her career by joining the Dendang troupe during the Japanese occupation of the Dutch East Indies. She later joined the Djantung Hati troupe. She joined the Miss Noni Beng Hwat Naut troupe as a singer and later became a friend with S. Waldy, who introduced her to Tan & Wong studio.

After the Indonesian National Revolution ended in 1949, Salmah was contracted by Tan & Wong with the Warnasari troupe. She made her film debut with Tirtonadi (1950), followed by Kembang Katjang (1950) and Nusa Kambangan (1950). She was the most productive actress in Tan & Wong's films from 1951 until 1952, where she appeared in seven films: Kusuma Hati (1951), Siti Aminah (1951), Fadjar Menjingsing (1951), Ternoda (1952), Chandra Dewi (1952), Maskawin (1952) and Tiga Benda Adjaib (1952). Most of her films were directed by Henry L. Duarte, an American director who established the Warnasari troupe.

In 1953, she was dismissed by Tan & Wong and moved to Golden Arrow. She starred in six films for Golden Arrow studio: Pangeran Hamid (1953), Empat Sekawan (1953), Burung Bitjara (1953), Harimau dan Merpati (1953), Tiga Saudari (1953) and Kelenting Kuning (1954).

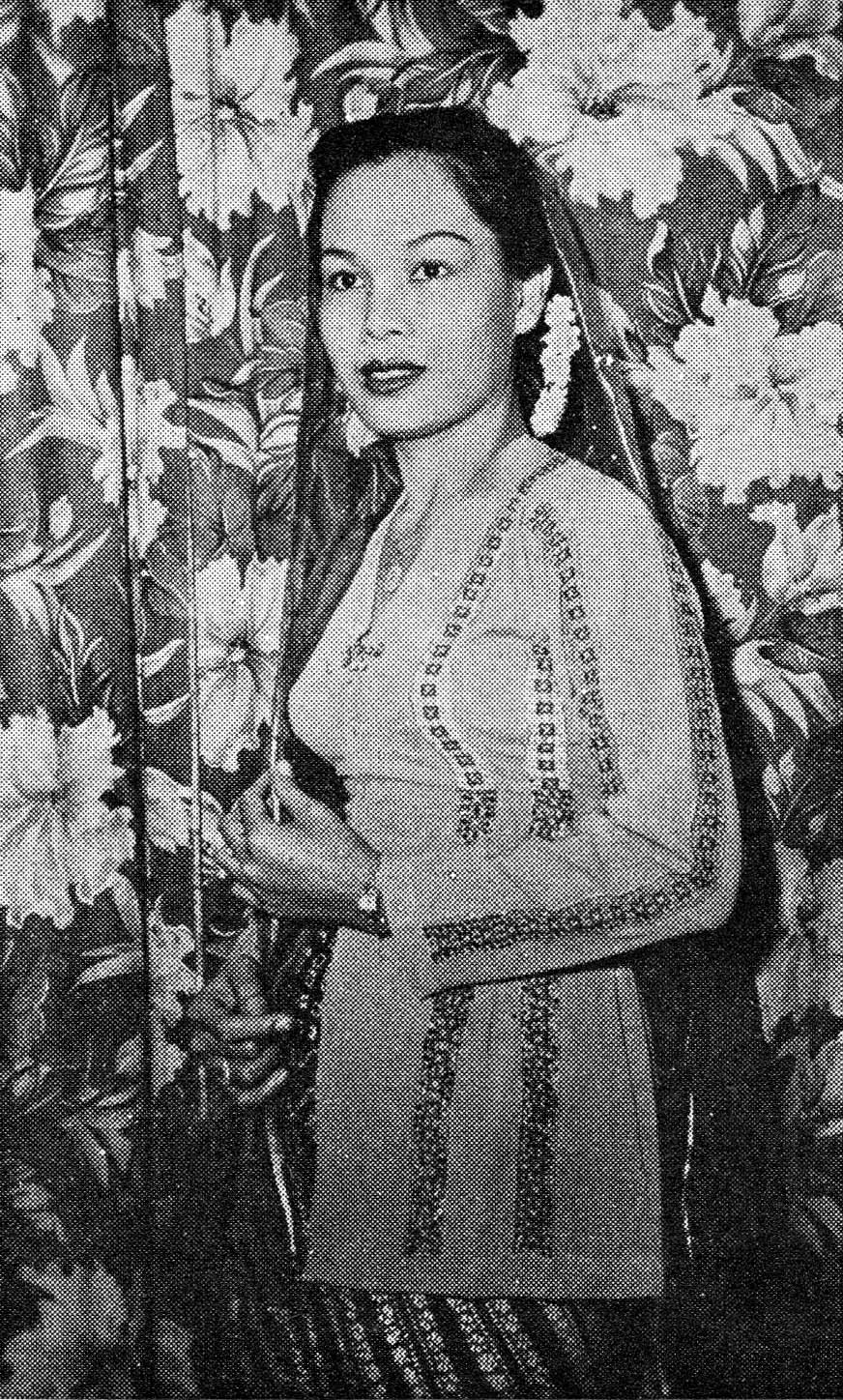
Salmah in 1955

During the production of Perobahan (1955), she replaced Nurnaningsih who was sacked because of absence. Salmah later took a 19-year break, returning to the industry in Arizal and Wisjnu Mouradhy's directed Gara-gara (1973). After she returned to industry, she was no longer offered leading roles, and instead took supporting roles in three more films in the 1970s (Anak yang Menderita (1974), Rintihan Gadis Buta (1976) and Duel Maut (1977)) before finally leaving the industry.

== Filmography ==
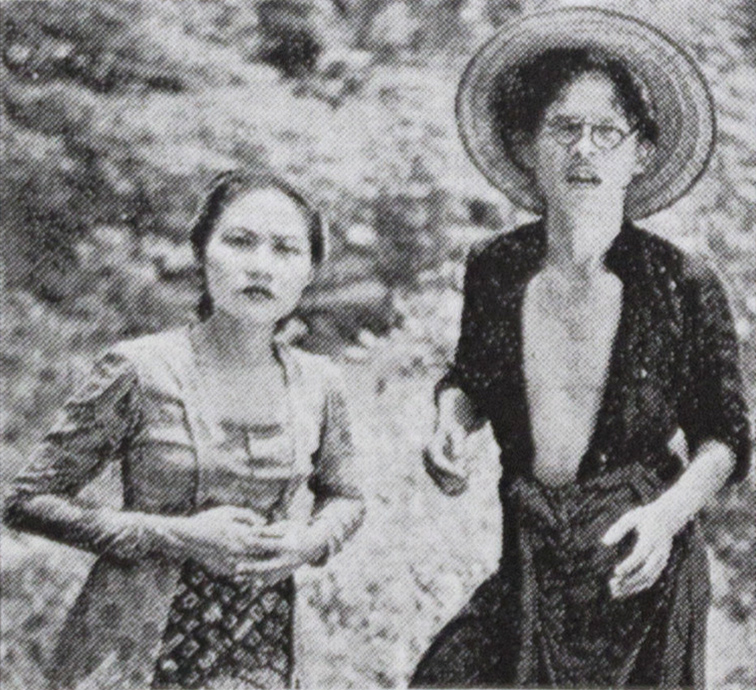
Salmah in a scene from Tirtonadi (1950)

Year	Film	Role	Notes
1950	Tirtonadi		
1950	Kembang Katjang		
1950	Nusa Kambangan		Credited as Siti Salmah
1951	Kusuma Hati		
1951	Siti Aminah		
1951	Fadjar Menjingsing		
1952	Ternoda		
1952	Chandra Dewi		
1952	Mas Kawin		
1952	Tiga Benda Adjaib		
1954	Djandjiku Djandjimu		Uncredited
