= Pamungkas (singer) =

Indonesian singer (born 1993)

- Born: Rizki Rahmahadian Pamungkas; 14 April 1993 (age 33); Jakarta, Indonesia
- Genres: Pop; Blues
- Occupations: Singer; record producer; songwriter; actor
- Instruments: Vocal; acoustic guitar; piano; electric guitar; drum
- Years active: 2013–present
- Label: Mas Pam

Rizki Rahmahadian Pamungkas (born 14 April 1993), better known mononymously as Pamungkas, is an Indonesian singer, record producer, songwriter, and actor.

== Early life ==
Pamungkas' introduction to music began at the age of 8, when he took drum lessons at the prompting of his mother, who had hoped that his hearing might improve in his left ear, which is half deaf. The drum lessons did not last long because Pamungkas wanted to drum fast, when he was taught to play slowly in stages. He also tried learning the piano and guitar by himself, but his guitar lessons had lasted only one month. At the age of 10, he told his father that he wanted to pursue music and not go to school. His father, who owns an artist management company named Oxygen Entertainment, got him to join the crew of a number of band tours.

After elementary school, Pamungkas attended SMP 200 Jakarta. While still at school, he performed at a café called La Piazza, where he was able to earn a regular income. Uninterested in formal education in school, he was eventually homeschooled for a year and 8 months.

Pamungkas delayed going to college for 4 years. Even though he was accepted for the Jakarta Arts Institute as well as for studying music at Pelita Harapan University, he eventually went to study Visual Communication Design at Paramadina University in 2014.

== Music career ==
Pamungkas joined a band called Potenzio in 2009, and they released an album titled Jingga.

Pamungkas released his debut solo album, Walk the Talk, in 2018 to popular acclaim. The album was in fact first released in 2017 with 10 songs, but re-released in 2018 with six more songs and a new cover. Most of the songs are written in English but three are in Indonesian. Songs in the album such as "Sorry", "One Only" and "Kenangan Manis" ("Sweet Memories") received over 30 million streams.

In 2019, he released his second album Flying Solo. This was followed by remixed albums of Walk The Talk as well as Flying Solo, and in 2020 The End Of Flying Solo Era.

In 2020, he released Solipsism and then a reworked companion album Solipsism 0.2 in 2021. Pamungkas became the most-streamed Indonesian artist in 2020 on Spotify Wrapped list. The Walk the Walk album was also the most-streamed album of 2020 in Indonesia, and the track "One Only" one of the top five most-streamed Indonesian songs.

In April 2021, Pamungkas' song "To the Bone" from Flying Solo became the longest-running top song on Spotify's Indonesia Top 50 chart. The video for the song has received over 240 million views on YouTube by July 2022.

He recorded two covers of songs by Dewa 19 in 2021: "Pupus" and "Risalah Hati".

In June 2022, Pamungkas released an album titled Birdy. The title track was released as a single, however, it caused controversy when it was revealed to show similarity to Charles Bukowski's poem "The Bluebird". He announced his first tour outside Indonesia, starting with shows in Philippines, Thailand, Malaysia and Singapore.

In January 2024, Pamungkas announced that he has joined a rock band, The Krankers, as the drummer. He released his fifth studio album, Hardcore Romance, in August 2024.

== Television ==
He was part of the music crew in the audio broadcaster section from 2013 to 2014 in a Trans TV television show entitled Islam Itu Indah (2013–2014).

== Discography ==
- Walk The Talk (2018)
- Flying Solo (2019)
- Solipsism (2020)
- Solipsism 0.2 (2021)
- Birdy (2022)
- Kemarin (EP) (2022)
- Live At Birdy South East Asia Tour (2023)
- Hardcore Romance (2024)

== Awards and nominations ==
| Year | Award | Category | Nominee / Work | Result | Ref |
|---|---|---|---|---|---|
| 2019 | AMI Awards | Best New Solo Artist | "I Love You but I'm Letting Go" | Nominated | |
| 2021 | AMI Awards | Best Album | Solipsism 0.2 | Nominated | |
| 2021 | AMI Awards | Best Alternative Performance (solo) | "I Don’t Wanna Be Alone" | Won | |
| 2021 | AMI Awards | Best Solo Pop Performance (Male) | "Risalah Hati" | Nominated | |
| 2021 | Indonesian Music Awards | Album of the Year | Solipsism 0.2 | Nominated | |
| 2021 | Indonesian Music Awards | Alternative Song of the Year | "To the Bone" | Won | |
| 2022 | AMI Awards | Best Album | Birdy | Nominated | |
| 2022 | AMI Awards | Best Alternative Male/Female Solo Artist | "Birdy" | Nominated | |
| 2023 | AMI Awards | Best Pop Male Solo Artist | "Kemarin" | Nominated | |
| 2024 | AMI Awards | Best Alternative Solo Act | "One Bad Day" | Nominated | |
| 2025 | AMI Awards | Best Alternative Solo Act | "Riddle of The Night" | Nominated | |
