= Monica Karina =

- Born: August 24, 1995 (age 30); Jakarta
- Genres: Electronic dance music; R&B
- Occupations: Singer; Songwriter
- Years active: 2018–present
- Label: Pon Your Tone

Monica Karina (born 24 August 1995) is a singer from Jakarta, Indonesia. She started her musical career after appearing on Dipha Barus' single "Money Honey (Count Me In)."

== Career ==
Monica's talent was accidentally discovered by Dipha Barus through the Instagram stories of Cindercella. Then, Monica and Dipha agreed to record the single "Money Honey (Count Me In)." The single became popular and Monica finally joined Dipha's record label, Pon Your Tone. On 31 August 2018, she and Dipha released another single, "Skin to Skin".

== Discography ==
=== Single ===
As the main artist

- "Skin to Skin" (with Dipha Barus) (2018)
- "Pon It" (2024)

As a collaborating artist

- "Money Honey (Count Me In)" (with Dipha Barus) (2018)
- “You Move Me” (with Dipha Barus) (2019)
- "Congratulations" (with Mira Jasmine) (2020)
- "High Off You/Southside G (with Greybox & Ezra Kunze) (2021)
- “Pretty Like You” (with Rahmania Astrini) (2021)
- “Please Don’t Find Closure” (with Kara Chenoa) (2023)

== Awards and nominations ==
| Year | Awards | Categories | Nominated works | Result |
|---|---|---|---|---|
| 2018 | Anugerah Musik Indonesia | Best of the Best Production Work | "Money Honey (Count Me In)" (with Dipha Barus) | Won |
| 2018 | Anugerah Musik Indonesia | Best of the Best Newcomer | "Money Honey (Count Me In)" (with Dipha Barus) | Nominated |
| 2018 | Anugerah Musik Indonesia | Best Collaboration Production Work | "Money Honey (Count Me In)" (with Dipha Barus) | Nominated |
| 2018 | Anugerah Musik Indonesia | Best Electronic Production Work | "Money Honey (Count Me In)" (with Dipha Barus) | Won |
| 2019 | Anugerah Musik Indonesia | Best Soul/R&B Male/Female Solo Artist | "Skin to Skin" | Nominated |
| 2020 | Anugerah Musik Indonesia | Artis Solo Pria/Wanita/Grup/Kolaborasi Dance Terbaik | "You Move Me" (with Dipha Barus) | Nominated |
| 2021 | Anugerah Musik Indonesia | Duo/Grup/Grup Vokal/Kolaborasi Soul/R&B Terbaik | "Pretty Like You" (with Rahmania Astrini) | Nominated |
