= Detty Kurnia =

Indonesian singer (1960–2010)

- Born: 1960; Jakarta, Indonesia
- Died: 20 April 2010 (aged 49–50); Bandung
- Occupations: Singer, songwriter

Detty Kurnia (1960 – 20 April 2010) was an Indonesian vocalist who sang pop sunda (a mix of Western pop and Sundanese music) by blending traditional Indonesian music with western music. She started singing at a young age, and released her record at the age of 11. Under a recording contract with Japanese Wave Records, in the year 1991 she recorded the album, Dari Sunda. She also had some songs in the album the Rough Guide to the Music of Indonesia. She was an iconic singer in the well known Indonesian musical genre of dangdut a folk and traditional music. Her song Dari Sunda in the Pop Sunda-style was among the five best albums listed by Q Magazine and acclaimed as "an imaginative, inventive gem throughout with Kurnia's mellow smile of a voice effortlessly binding everything together."

== Biography ==
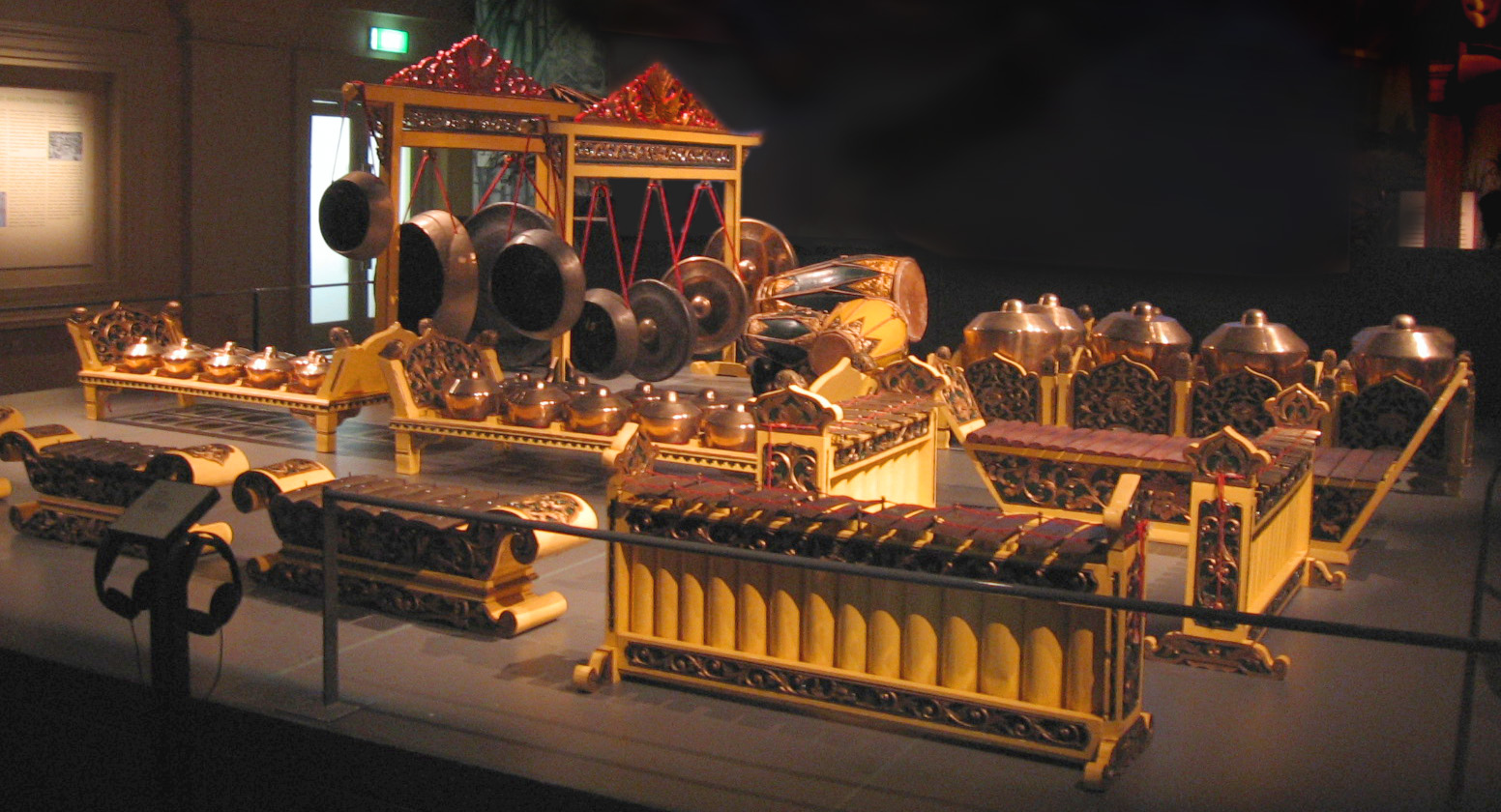
Gamelan, a percussion orchestra

Kurnia was born in 1960 at Bandung, the Sundanese capital in Indonesia. She was the daughter of musician Iding Martawijiya, a Sundanese (west Java) gamelan player; gamelan is a percussion orchestra which is played by many artists concurrently. She started singing from the age of six and in the following three years she gave performances at weddings and other celebrations. She released her first song album when she was 11 years old.

Kurnia started her musical career in the 1970s. For her international singing assignments she collaborated with Makoto Kubota, producer in Japan and released the album Rayungan, which was a remix released in Japan. Continuing this collaboration she released her next album titled Dari Sunda in 1991, which was also released on the occasion of the Women of the World series in 1995 under the Riverboat label. She was married and had children.

Kurnia's peak period of performance was from 1970 to 1990. Her popular renditions were "Rose Bodas" and "Maribaya". During the 1990s she had performed at the International fair at Osaka and Tokyo, Japan. Her other record released internationally during 1993 was Coyor Panon. Her music was a blend of Javanese pop, traditional and neo-traditional styles. She was also a song writer in Indonesian language. From 1981, for nine years, she recorded songs and released audio tapes of 40 songs for Dian Records, a Java-based firm.

Kurnia died at the age of 49 due to cancer on 20 April 2010 at Bandung.

== Bibliography ==
- Broughton, Simon; Ellingham, Mark (2000). World Music: The Rough Guide. Latin and North America, Caribbean, India, Asia and Pacific. Rough Guides. ISBN 978-1-85828-636-5.
- Smith, Bonnie G. (2008). The Oxford Encyclopedia of Women in World History: 4 Volume Set. Oxford University Press, USA. ISBN 978-0-19-514890-9.
- Toop, David (1995). Ocean of Sound: Aether Talk, Ambient Sound and Imaginary Worlds. Serpent's Tail. ISBN 978-1-85242-382-7.
