= Harry Roesli =

- Roesli in 2002

Background information
- Born: Djauhar Zaharsjah Fachruddin Roesli; 10 September 1951; Bandung, Indonesia
- Died: 11 December 2004 (aged 53) Jakarta, Indonesia
- Formerly of: The Gang of Harry Rusli

Djauhar Zaharsjah Fachruddin Roesli (10 September 1951 – 11 December 2004), better known as Harry Roesli, was an Indonesian singer-songwriter.

== Biography ==
Roesli was born with the full name Djauhar Zaharsjah Fachruddin Roesli in Bandung, West Java, on 10 September 1951; he was the youngest of Major General Roeshan Roesli's four children. Harry Roesli is the grandson of Marah Roesli, a famous Indonesian writer from Minangkabau background. Harry Roesli wed to Kania Perdani Handiman, the couple have twin sons, Layala Khrisna Patria and Lahami Khrisna Parana.

In 1970, he enrolled in the aviation engineering program at the Bandung Institute of Technology. He also studied music under Remy Sylado and Slamet Abdul Sjukur.

In the early 1970s, Roesli formed The Gang of Harry Rusli. First playing rock and blues, they later switched to acoustic and made a protest album inspired by Bob Dylan. He released his debut solo album, Philosophy Gang, in 1973. Although initially interested in becoming a writer like his grandfather and writing numerous pieces of poetry, his work was never published. After his album with The Gang of Harry Rusli, he went to the Jakarta Art Educational Institute. then studied on scholarship at the Rotterdam Conservatory in the Netherlands for two years; he graduated in 1981.

Upon his return, Roesli began work on an avant-garde project mixing the sounds of Iannis Xenakis, John Cage, and Karlheinz Stockhausen with poetry by Yudhistira Ardi Noegraha. In 1982 Roesli began occasionally collaborating with Putu Wijaya; the two would sometimes go overseas together for performances. Roesli also collaborated with Nano Riantiarno's Teater Koma and several international troupes. He also took a position as professor of music at the Indonesia University of Education and Pasundan University, both in Bandung.

On 17 August 2001, Roesli performed a satirized version of the patriotic song "Garuda Pancasila", changing the lyrics to say that he was tired of the lack of reform in the period following the fall of Suharto. The performance, held during independence day celebrations in front of the home of former president Abdurrahman Wahid, led to him being questioned by police; the police considered charging him with expressing hatred and hostility toward the Indonesian government, a crime under Article 154 of the Criminal Code. Roesli later wrote a letter of apology to family of the song's composer, Sudharnoto, and issued a public apology to those who may have been offended. Citing health issues, he requested a delay in questioning. The issue was eventually dropped.

From 19 to 21 October of the same year, Roesli held his first exhibition since Independence Day. The event, titled "Teroris, Pentas Musik 50 Jam" ("Terrorist, 50-hour Music Performance") and held at Rumah Nusantara cafe and gallery in northern Bandung, featured hundreds of singers ranging from the well known to street artists.

Roesli was known for sympathizing with street musicians, eventually turning his home in an elite district of Bandung into the Harry Roesli Music Education Institute; the institute provided training to talented street children free of charge. Roesli also donated his front yard as a place for street vendors to sell their wares. In 2003, Roesli toured Indonesia with street musicians under his tutelage. The tour, called Ziarah Seni (Pilgrimage of Art), was meant to disprove that Roesli's music was exclusive. In response to claims of exclusiveness, he told The Jakarta Post "music is for listening, not for understanding". By the time of his death he had helped over 36,000 street children.

On 3 October 2004, Roesli was admitted to Harapan Kita Hospital in Jakarta after suffering a heart attack. He died at the hospital at 7:55 pm local time (UTC +7) on 11 December 2004. Among the attendees of his viewing in Menteng, Central Jakarta were former head of the armed forces General Wiranto. Educational figure Arief Rahman led the prayers. After the viewing, his body was buried in the family cemetery in Ciomas, Bogor.

== Legacy ==
In 2009 Rolling Stone Indonesia selected Roesli's song "Malaria", from his first solo album "Philosophy Gang", as the 44th best Indonesian song of all time.

== Personal life ==
Roesli was a grandson of Marah Roesli, an author known for his novel Sitti Nurbaya (Wrong Upbringing). He married Kania Perdani Handiman in 1980; together the couple had twins. His siblings are all doctors.

Hera Diani, writing in The Jakarta Post, notes that he often wore all black. His former teacher Remi Sylado, in an obituary in Tempo, wrote that at times he seemed unkempt, and after returning from the Netherlands was like "a river in the rainy season", full of unbridled creativity.
