= Terry Shahab =

- Also known as: Terry Shahab
- Born: Terryana Fathiah Shahab; 14 June 1984 (age 41); Jakarta, Indonesia
- Genres: Pop
- Occupation: Singer
- Instrument: Vocals
- Years active: 2003–present
- Labels: Sony Music Indonesia, Epic Records

Terryana Fathiah Shahab (born 14 June 1984), better known as Terry Shahab or Terry, is an Indonesian singer. She is best known for her recording of "Janji Manismu", which was a hit in Indonesia.

== Early life ==
Terry was born in Jakarta and resides in Central Jakarta, Jakarta. She began singing as a child.

== Singing career ==
Terry started her career in 2004 as a professional backup singer for Dewa 19 band and singer Audy. In the same year, she was recording "Katakanlah" with Rio Febrian for Febrian's album Ku Ada Disini. Her first single was Koes Plus's song titled "Hatiku Beku" which made her known as an Indonesian singer. The song appeared on the compilation album titled "Now and Forever" in 2006. And in the same year, she released her first self-titled album, "TERRY", with the first single, "Janji Manismu" which became a hit in Indonesia and made her a new rising singer in Indonesia. Her second single was "Kepingan Hati" but this song failed on Indonesia music chart. On 2007, Terry got a chance to duet with singer from France Julian Cely for his first Indonesia album on song "Tentang Kita". That song was mix between Indonesian and French languages On 2011, she released her second album titled "Are You Ready" with single "Harusnya Kau Pilih Aku".

== Influences ==
Terry has named Titi DJ, Ruth Sahanaya, Whitney Houston, Beyoncé and Celine Dion.

== Discography ==
=== Studio albums ===
- TERRY (2006)
- Are You Ready (2011)
- Indah (2014)

=== Singles ===
- "Katakanlah" (with Rio Febrian) (2004)
- "Hatiku Beku" (2006)
- "Janji Manismu" (2006)
- "Kepingan hati" (2006)
- "Tentang Kita" (with Julian Cely) (2007)
- "Syahadat Cinta" (2008)
- "Setulus Hati" (with Nindy dan Lala Karmela) (2010)
- "Harusnya Kau Pilih Aku" (2011)
- "Ijinkan Aku Menyayangimu" (2011)
- "Kita Bisa" (with Yovie n Friends) (2011)
- "Butiran Debu" (2012)

== Awards and nominations ==
Year	Type	Award	Result
2013	Anugerah Musik Indonesia	Best Female Pop Vocal Solo ("Butiran Debu")	Nominated
