= Norazia =

Indonesian musician

Norazia is an Indonesian musician with an unusual fusion of traditional Indonesian music and IDM. She incorporates various instruments in her songs, including Balinese gamelan instruments and tablas. Her debut album, Cinnamon Cassia was released October 2003. She has collaborated with Talvin Singh in one song in the album, "Wau Bule". She received 4 nominations at the Anugerah Planet Muzik 2005.

She released a new album entitled CORE in April 2008.
