= Naura Ayu =

Indonesian actress and singer (born 2005)

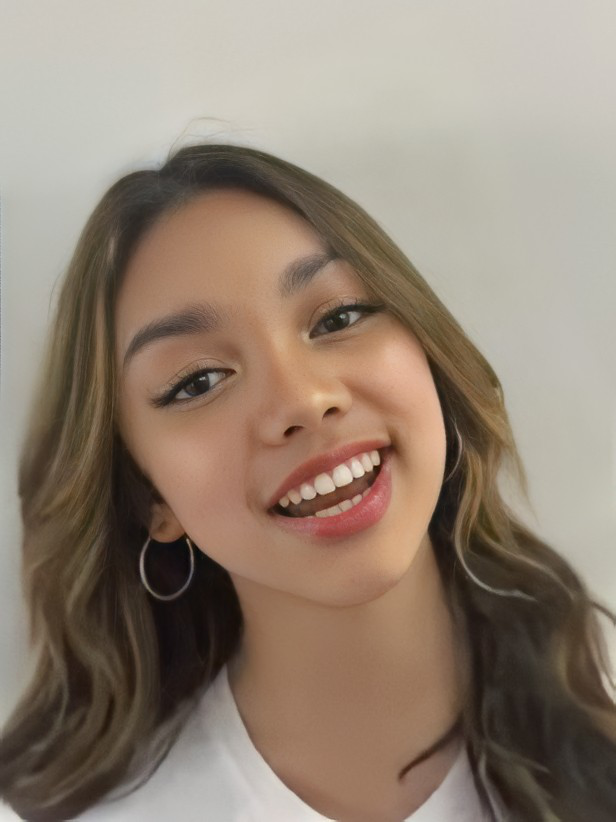
- Naura Ayu in 2022
- Born: Adyla Rafa Naura Ayu; 18 June 2005 (age 21); Jakarta, Indonesia
- Occupations: Singer, celebrity
- Musical career
- Genres: Pop; RnB; Ballad
- Instrument: Vocal
- Years active: 2014–present
- Labels: Catz (2014–2015); Trinity Optima

Adyla Rafa Naura Ayu (born 18 June 2005) is an Indonesian actress and singer. Following her mother's career, Riafinola Ifani Sari, Naura Ayu became a child singer in 2014 with the release of her first studio album Dongeng which won the award for Best Children's Album in the Anugerah Musik Indonesia 2015. Naura Ayu is the first Indonesian child singer to win the Triple Platinum award thanks to her fourth album, Katakanlah Cinta which has sold 500 thousand CDs.

To date, Naura Ayu is the only child singer who has won the most awards for Best Child Solo Artist from the Anugerah Musik Indonesia, three times in 2016, 2018, and 2019.

At the end of 2019, Naura Ayu ended her career as a child singer and rebranded herself as a teenage singer, marked by holding the Konser Dongeng 4, which was the closing of the Konser Dongeng since 2015. In early 2021, Naura Ayu released the single "Kisah Kasih Sayang" which is her first single as a teenage singer.

== Early life ==
Naura Ayu was born on 18 June 2005 in Jakarta, Indonesia. She is the eldest of four children. Her father, Baldy Mulya Putra, is a businessman, and her mother, Riafinola Ifani Sari, is a singer. Naura Ayu is of Palembang and Batak descent through her father also Javanese and Minangkabau through her mother. Naura Ayu has 3 younger siblings, namely Adyano Rafi Bevan Putra, Anodya Shula Neona Ayu, who also works as a singer and Aladya Odetta Nakeya Ayu.

Naura Ayu got singing talent from her mother. She has shown interest in music since she was 3 years old, at which time Naura Ayu preferred to watch musical cartoon videos rather than other cartoon videos. However, her mother, Nola, did not want to take Naura's interest seriously because Nola considered children of Naura's age usually get tired and bored easily.

When she was 5 years old, Naura Ayu asked to sing but was not allowed by her mother because she thought she was too young. But the desire remained until two years later. For two years, Naura Ayu learned to sing at home and studied the genre of music she liked. Naura Ayu admits that she likes classical musicals, such as Sound of Music, and songs from older singers, such as Frank Sinatra, Queen and Michael Jackson. In addition, she also listens to modern singers, such as Beyonce and Ariana Grande, as well as Ardhito Pramono, Raisa and her teammate Lala Karmela from Indonesia. Naura Ayu was only allowed to become a singer when she was 7 years old because her mother wanted to ensure that Naura Ayu was determined and consistently pursued her singing talent.

== Career ==
=== 2014 – 2015: Dongeng and Konser Dongeng Musikal ===
Following her mother's career in the music industry, Naura Ayu started her career as a child singer at the age of 8 by releasing her first studio album entitled Dongeng through the Catz Records label. The Dongeng album launched on 2 June 2014, at Galeri Indonesia Kaya, Grand Indonesia, Jakarta Pusat. At that time, Naura Ayu was present in the midst of the absence of children's music, where the Indonesian music industry was battered with love songs.

Dongeng succeeded in bringing Naura Ayu to her first award in the music industry as the Best Children's Album from the Anugerah Musik Indonesia 2015.

In 2015, Naura Ayu held a musical-themed concert titled Konser Dongeng which was inspired by her debut album, Dongeng with the theme of the story being carried out was about herself, life, ideas, nature, thoughts, environment, school, family and her dream.

=== 2016: Langit yang Sama ===
After joining the Trinity Optima Production record company, on 11 March 2016, she released her second studio album, entitled Langit yang Sama.This album is themed on daily life with educational content and moral messages in each song. In the process, all the songs were composed by Mhala & Tantra Numata with the concept of arrangement for all the songs on the album Langit yang Sama done in an orchestra with a musical approach so that it is easy for children to digest.

Langit yang Sama managed to bring Naura to win the Best Children's Album award from Anugerah Musik Indonesia 2016 for the second time and won the Best Solo Female Child Singer award in the same event through the Untuk Tuhan song, which is the first single from the Langit yang Sama album.

=== 2017: Naura and Genk Juara ===
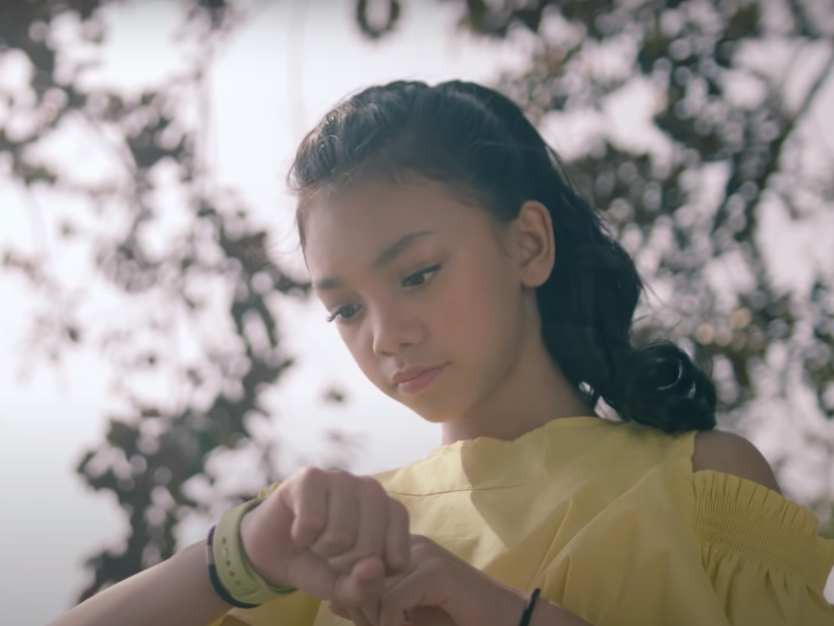
Naura Ayu appearance in her "Berani Bermimpi" music video

In 2017, Naura Ayu made her acting debut by starring in the Naura & Genk Juara musical film. In this film, Naura was allowed to play the main role as Naura Ayu herself, leader of Juara gang.

In the previous year, she also voiced in the animated film Petualangan Singa Pemberani Atlantos 2 voiced the character Bella, the daughter of the mayor of Seal Island. Naura & Genk Juara is not the first time for Naura Ayu to act, previously she was involved in a folklore musical theater entitled Timun Mas the Musical which was held in June 2013 as young Mawar.

Apart from being the main character, she also sang the album's theme song for the film. Ost. Naura & Genk Juara album consists of 9 songs all performed by Naura Ayu and composed by Mhala and Tantra Numata.

Through Naura & Genk Juara succeeded in bringing Naura was nominated as the Chosen Actor/Child Actress/Teenager in the Piala Maya 2017. In addition, she also won an award as the Best Male and Female Solo Artist at the Anugerah Musik Indonesia 2018 through the song Berani Bermimpi which is the last track from Ost. Naura & Genk Juara.

=== 2018 – 2019: Katakanlah Cinta and Konser Dongeng 4 ===
In 2018, Naura Ayu released her fourth album entitled Katakanlah Cinta. The album consists of 11 songs, of which there are 4 previously released singles, 2 songs from the Dongeng album and 3 songs from Ost. Naura & Genk Juara. Different from the previous 3 albums, which were specifically for children and packaged musically, Katakanlah Cinta is themed about love that is universal and packed with pop nuances. Like the previous album, this album is again done by Shimhala Avadana & Tantra Numata as songwriters.

In June 2019, Katakanlah Cinta managed to achieve sales of over 500 thousand CDs through marketing at a fast food restaurant, KFC. This made Naura Ayu the first child singer to receive the "Triple Platinum" award.

In February 2019, Naura Ayu was selected to be one of 16 Indonesian participants who received a scholarship from Galeri Indonesia Kaya to take part in the performing arts training Broadway in the United States in the program Ruang Kreatif: Indonesia Menuju Broadway. This program is organized by Bakti Budaya Djarum Foundation in collaboration with Passport to Broadway, New York City. Naura has participated in the program since July 2019 and lasts for 3 weeks.

On 21 December 2019, along with Galeri Indonesia Kaya, Naura Ayu held the Konser Dongeng 4. Konser Dongeng 4 was the closing of the Konser Dongeng series that had been going on since 2015, as well as Naura Ayu's last concert as a child singer and a sign that Naura Ayu entered a new phase as a teenage singer at the age of 14.

=== 2020–present: As a teenage singer ===
Approaching her teenage years, Naura Ayu actively discussed mental health issues, self-love, and daily life, one of which was by creating a single entitled "Di Kelilingi Cinta".

On 11 October 2020, Naura Ayu launched her podcast entitled Naw You Tell Me which was broadcast on her official YouTube channel. This podcast was initiated by Naura's desire to share experiences about life, mental health, self-love, and other issues regarding youth.

Through her interview with Indonesian media, Popbela in 2021, Naura Ayu said that the single "Kisah Kasih Sayang" which was released on 19 March 2021, was her first single as a teenage singer. In her career as a teenage singer, Naura Ayu admits that her musical style has become more minimalist, with more mature arrangements and wider song inspiration.

Naura studied junior high school at Al Jabr Islamic School and graduated in 2020. She then underwent high school education at the Sekolah Murid Merdeka with a blended learning system, namely a combination of offline and online learning methods. In 2023, she became a student of Universitas Pelita Harapan's Communication Sciences major.

== Discography ==
Studio Album

- Dongeng (2014)
- Langit yang Sama (2016)
- Katakanlah Cinta (2018)
- Cerita Penuh Cahaya (2026)

Soundtrack Album

- Ost. Naura & Genk Juara (2017)

Single

- Untuk Tuhan (2015)
- Bully (2016)
- Katakanlah Cinta (2018)
- Sang Juara (with Zizi) – 2018 Asian Para Games (Official Song) (2018)
- Selamanya Untukmu (#TemanNaura) (2018)
- Karena Kamu Artinya Cinta (Sentuhan Ibu) (with Nola) (2018)
- Aku Indonesia (2018)
- Harmoni (with Devano Danendra) (2019)
- Dikelilingi Cinta (2020)
- Kisah Kasih Sayang (2021)
- Jalan Tengah (2021)
- Menikmati Sedih (2022)
- Cinta (2023)
- Bye (2023)
- Pemilik Rindu (2023)
- Ternyata (2024)
- Di Depan Mata (2024)
- Lampu Jalan (2025)
- Terima Kasih (2026)

== Filmography ==
=== Film ===
Year	Title	Role	Note	Ref.
2016	Petualangan Singa Pemberani Atlantos	Bella	Voice	
2017	Naura & Genk Juara	Naura		
2019	DoReMi & You	Putri		

=== Television series ===
Year	Title	Role	Note	Ref.
2017	The After School Adventures of Paddle Pop	Liona	Voice	

=== Web series ===
Year	Title	Role	Note	Ref.
2022	My Nerd Girl	Fara Andrea		
2022	My Nerd Girl	Fara Andreani		
2023	My Nerd Girl 2	Fara Andreani		
2024	My Nerd Girl 3	Rea		

=== Music video appearance ===
Year	Title	Role	Album	Ref.
2021	"Rembulan"	Devano Danendra	—N/a	

=== Musical drama ===
Year	Title	Role	Note	Ref.
2013	Timun Mas the Musical	Mawar (young)	Istora Senayan, Jakarta	
2016	Berani Bermimpi		Balai Kartini Jakarta	

=== Television ===
Year	Title	Role	Note	Ref.
2016	Nickelodeon Indonesia Kids' Choice Awards	Host		
2016–2017	Indonesian Idol Junior	Co-host		
2018	Naura & the Baldys	Host	Special program, 1 episode	

=== Theme Park ===
Year	Title	Role	Note	Ref.
2023	Tirta Cerita Multimedia Show	Theme Song and Akhir Yang Bahagia Singer, Klenting Kuning (Background Vocal in Aku Yuyu Kangkang Song), Bawang Putih, Purbasari, Candra Kirana, Timun Mas	Taman Mini Indonesia Indah, Jakarta	

== Bibliography ==
- 2017 – Aku Naura: 100% Official
- 2018 - Aku Naura: The Official Scrapbook
- 2020 – Konser Dongeng Naura
- 2022 – A Teen's Guide to Self Discovery

== Awards and nominations ==
Year	Type	Award	Result
2015	Anugerah Musik Indonesia	Best Children Album "(Dongeng)"	Won
2016	Anugerah Musik Indonesia	Best Children Album "(Langit yang Sama)"	Won
2016	Anugerah Musik Indonesia	Best Child Female Solo Singer "(Untuk Tuhan)"	Won
2018	Anugerah Musik Indonesia	Best Child Male and Female Solo Artist "(Berani Bermimpi)"	Won
2019	Anugerah Musik Indonesia	Best Child Male and Female Solo Artist "(Selamanya Untukmu)"	Won
2019	Anugerah Musik Indonesia	Best Child Duo/Group/Vocal Group/Collaboration "(Harmoni)" feat. Devano Danendra	Won
2019	Anugerah Musik Indonesia	Best Child Duo/Group/Vocal Group/Collaboration "(Karena Kamu Artinya Cinta (Sentuhan Ibu))" feat. Nola	Nominated
2016	Dahsyatnya Awards	Terdahsyat Child Artist	Nominated
2017	Dahsyatnya Awards	Terdahsyat Child Artist	Nominated
2015	Mom and Kids Awards	Favorite Child Singer	Won
2016	Mom and Kids Awards	Favorite Child Singer	Won
2017	Mom and Kids Awards	Favorite Idol	Won
2017	Mom and Kids Awards	Anak Gemilang	Won
2018	Mom and Kids Awards	Favorite Idol	Won
2017	Piala Maya	Selected Child & Teenage Actor/Actress Naura & Genk Juara	Nominated
2019	Piala Maya	Selected Child & Teenage Actor/Actress DoReMi & You	Nominated
2019	Piala Maya	Selected Theme Song "(Harmoni" from DoReMi & You) feat. Devano Danendra	Nominated
