= Poppy Mercury =

Indonesian singer (1972–1995)

- Born: Poppy Yusfidawaty; 15 November 1972; Bandung, Indonesia
- Died: 28 August 1995 (aged 22) Bandung, Indonesia
- Genres: Rock, pop, pop rock, slow rock, pop metal, rock kapak
- Occupation: singer
- Instruments: Vocals, piano, guitar
- Years active: 1990–1995
- Labels: Musica Studios, Akurama Records, Blackboard, Universal Indonesia

Poppy Mercury (15 November 1972 – 28 August 1995), born Poppy Yusfidawaty, was an Indonesian rock singer and musician, active in the 1990s.

== Early life ==
Poppy Yusfidawaty was born in Bandung in 1972, as the fifth of seven children of H. Kemal Johan (June 3, 1939 – September 17, 2021) and Hj. Titi Supiyati (January 3, 1941 – July 30, 2004). Her father worked at the Bukit Unggul Cinchona Factory, which caused the family to move periodically throughout his childhood. She began singing and playing musical instruments, including the piano and guitar, during her time at school.

After graduating from Korpri High School, she began working at Bank BTPN with her best friend Moudy Wilhelmina. Poppy and Moudy's inspiration was influenced by Anni-Frid Lyngstad, a singer from the group ABBA. In its development, both girls imitated the pattern of Anni-Frid Lyngstad in Sweden.

== Career ==
Mercury's recording career began in 1990, when she released her debut power ballad single, "Terlalu Pagi" at the age of 18. In 1991, she released the singles "Fantasia Bulan Madu" and "Suci Dalam Debu" alongside Malaysian singer Saleem Iklim. Her debut album, Antara Jakarta-Penang, was released the same year. It was followed up in 1992 with Surat Undangan and with Terlambat Sudah and Antara Kau Dia dan Aku in 1993. Her 1994 album Biarkan Ku Pergi showcased a more pop-oriented direction with a power ballad. In 1995, she released Hati Siapa Tak Luka and Tak Mungkin Dipisahkan.

== Death ==
Poppy Mercury performed her last live show on 2 August 1995 in Padang. She had been suffering from poor health prior to the performance, but agreed to hold the concert to avoid disappointing those who planned to attend. In the days following the concert, her condition deteriorated rapidly. On 25 August, she was admitted to Hasan Sadikin Hospital in Bandung, before dying on 28 August from complications related to gastritis, bronchitis, and rheumatism. She was buried at the Sirnaraga public cemetery in Bandung. Her death occurred in the same year as that of several other young Indonesian performers, such as Nike Ardilla and Abiem Ngesti.

== Discography ==
=== Albums ===
- Antara Jakarta - Penang (1991)
- Surat Undangan (1992)
- Terlambat Sudah (1993)
- Antara Kau Dia dan Aku (1993)
- Biarkan Ku Pergi (1994)
- Hati Siapa Tak Luka (1995)
- Tak Mungkin Dipisahkan (1995)
- Bukan Aku Yang Kau Cinta (1995)
- Satukanlah Hati Kami Malaysia Version (2004)

=== Single ===
- Terlalu Pagi (1990)
- Masih Adakah Cinta (1993)
- Badai Asmara (1993)
- Tragedi Kuala Lumpur Dan Penang (1994)
- Betapa Sayang Aku Padamu (1994)
- Mama Aku Ingin Pulang (1995)
- Satukanlah Hati Kami (1995)
- Air Mata Jadi Saksi (1996)
- Cinta Kita Pudar (1997)
- Ku Ingin Kembali (Unplugged) (1999)
- Cinta Dua Remaja (2002)

=== Duet ===
- Suci Dalam Debu ft Saleem (Iklim) (1991)
- Cinta Kita ft Saleem (Iklim) (1991)
- Kugenggam Dunia ft Abiem Ngesti (1992)
