= 27th Annual Anugerah Musik Indonesia =

2024 edition of award ceremony

- Date: 4 December 2024
- Location: Ciputra Artpreneur; Jakarta, Indonesia
- Hosted by: Robby Purba; Sere Kalina; Indra Bekti; Fina Philippe; Reza Chandika; Conchita Caroline

Highlights
- Most awards: Salma Salsabil (5)
- Most nominations: Salma Salsabil (9)
- Website: www.ami-awards.com

Television/radio coverage
- Network: Moji

The 27th annual Anugerah Musik Indonesia ceremony took place on 4 December 2024 at the Ciputra Artpreneur, Jakarta. It was hosted by presenters Robby Purba, Sere Kalina, Indra Bekti, Fina Philippe, Reza Chandika, and Conchita Caroline, and was televised by Moji.

Salma Salsabil won the most awards of the night with five, including Production Work of the Year for "Bunga Hati". Bernadya won the Album of the Year for her debut studio album Sialnya, Hidup Harus Tetap Berjalan, along with two other awards.

== Winners and nominees ==
The nominees were announced on 15 October 2024 in a livestream on the ceremony's official YouTube channel. Salma Salsabil led the nominations with nine, followed by Hindia, Nadin Amizah, and Sal Priadi with six each.

Winners appear first and highlighted in bold.

=== General Field ===
| **Production Work of the Year**: **"Bunga Hati" – Salma Salsabil**‡; "Cincin" – Hindia; "Gala Bunga Matahari" – Sal Priadi; "Kita Bikin Romantis" – Maliq & D'Essentials; "Untungnya, Hidup Harus Tetap Berjalan" – Bernadya | **Album of the Year**: **Sialnya, Hidup Harus Tetap Berjalan – Bernadya**‡; CAN MACHINES FALL IN LOVE? – Maliq & D'Essentials; Lagipula Hidup Akan Berakhir – Hindia; MARKERS AND SUCH PENS FLASHDISKS – Sal Priadi; Nonfiksi – Juicy Luicy; Untuk Dunia, Cinta, dan Kotornya – Nadin Amizah |
**Newcomer of the Year**: **Nyoman Paul – "Mundur Perlahan"**‡; ArumtaLa – "Masuk Angin"; Giant Jay – "Raksasa"; Owan – "Sembuhkan Luka"; Rizwan Fadilah – "Cerita Tiba-Tiba"; Rony Parulian – "Mengapa"

=== Pop ===
| **Best Female Pop Solo Act**: **Salma Salsabil – "Bunga Hati"**‡; Bernadya – "Untungnya, Hidup Harus Tetap Berjalan"; Lyodra – "Tak Dianggap"; Mahalini – "Mati-Matian"; Nadin Amizah – "Tawa"; Raisa – "Tak Berharap Lagi"; Tiara Andini – "Kupu-Kupu" | **Best Male Pop Solo Act**: **Sal Priadi – "Gala Bunga Matahari"**‡; Andmesh Kamaleng – "Talalu Sakit"; Fabio Asher – "Berharap Kau Kembali"; Nadhif Basalamah – "Jatuh Cinta Lagi"; Rizky Febian – "Kata" |
| **Best Pop Duo/Group**: **Maliq & D'Essentials – "Kita Bikin Romantis"**‡; Coldiac – "Jangan Pernah Berubah"; For Revenge – "Sadrah"; Juicy Luicy – "Asing"; Kahitna – "Sejauh Dua Benua" | **Best Pop Songwriter**: **Bernadya and Petra Sihombing – "Untungnya, Hidup Harus Tetap Berjalan" (performed by Bernadya)**‡; Angga Puradiredja, Dendy Sukarno, Ilman Ibrahim, Indah Wisnuwardhana, and Widi Puradiredja – "Aduh" (performed by Maliq & D'Essentials); Arya Aditya Ramadhya, Ilman Ibrahim, and Nino Kayam – "Boleh Juga" (performed by Salma Salsabil); Clara Riva – "Bunga Hati" (performed by Salma Salsabil); Sal Priadi – "Gala Bunga Matahari" (performed by Sal Priadi) |
| **Best Pop Producer**: **S/EEK – "Bunga Hati" (performed by Salma Salsabil)**‡; Andi Rianto – "Sepenuh Hati" (performed by Andi Rianto and Rony Parulian); Lafa Pratomo – "Tawa" (performed by Nadin Amizah); Laleilmanino – "Boleh Juga" (performed by Salma Salsabil); Laleilmanino – "Djakarta" (performed by Laleilmanino, Diskoria, and Cécil Yang) | **Best Pop Album**: **Sialnya, Hidup Harus Tetap Berjalan – Bernadya**‡; CAN MACHINES FALL IN LOVE? – Maliq & D'Essentials; MARKERS AND SUCH PENS FLASHDISKS – Sal Priadi; Nonfiksi – Juicy Luicy; Untuk Dunia, Cinta, dan Kotornya – Nadin Amizah |

=== Rock ===
| **Best Rock Solo Act**: **Isyana Sarasvati – "Ada-Ada Aja"**‡; Aldrian Risjad – "Pujaan Massa"; Arya Novanda – "Rockstar"; Clever Moose – "Mediterranean Fuzz"; Willy Sket – "Hari Kiamat" | **Best Rock Duo/Group/Collaboration**: **.Feast – "Konsekuens"**‡; Barasuara – "Etalase"; Koil – "Tak Ada Wifi di Alam Baka"; Summerlane – "Sebelum Selamanya"; The Krankers – "Here I Am" |
**Best Rock Album**: **Malam – Jangar**‡; Coltrane Brigade Communique – Leipzig; Jangan Padam – Aldrian Risjad; Mediterranean Fuzz – Clever Moose; Tak Ada Wifi di Alam Baka – Koil

=== Jazz ===
| **Best Jazz Act**: **Sri Hanuraga – "II. Deception"**‡; Dua Empat, Duo Mobysade – "Isn't It Romantic"; Indra Lesmana – "Fairlight"; Tohpati – "Retro Funk"; Vira Talisa – "Like It Was Meant To Be" | **Best Alternative Jazz Act**: **Barry Likumahuwa & The Rhythm Service – "Sign of Love"**‡; Ardhito Pramono – "Love Song For Chesney"; ArumtaLa – "Masuk Angin"; Batavia Collective – "Kenny's Groove"; Littlefingers – "Everything Starts Here" |
**Best Jazz Album**: **Retro Funk – Tohpati**‡; (De)Conception – Sri Hanuraga; Bercerita – ArumtaLa; Cinema – Natasya Elvira; Primasuara – Various Artists

=== Soul/R&B ===
| **Best Soul/R&B Solo Act**: **Jordan Susanto – "Senopati in the Rain"**‡; Cakra Khan – "Tennessee Whiskey"; Moneva – "One Way"; Rahmania Astrini – "Goodnight Kiss (in December)"; Teza Sumendra – "Got Supplies" | **Best Soul/R&B Duo/Group/ Collaboration**: **Coldiac – "I Don't Mind"**‡; Caste – "Scars"; Gavendri featuring Tuantigabelas – "The Party Is Over"; Livingroom. – "misscall"; Thee Marloes – "I Know" |
| **Best Contemporary R&B Solo Act**: **Paul Partohap – "CANDYRELLA"**‡; Assia Keva – "I'm So High"; Eva Celia – "Crush"; NONI – "Midori"; RINNI – "Triumphant" | **Best Contemporary R&B Duo/Group/Collaboration**: **Galdive – "Stay"**‡; Annisya and Teza Sumendra – "Feenin'"; Dreane – "Take Me"; GAC (Gamaliél Audrey Cantika) – "REALLY REALLY WANT"; Rayi Putra featuring NONI – "Casper" |

=== Dangdut ===
| **Best Dangdut Solo Act**: **Lesti – "Terkesan"**‡; Hari Putra – "Ku Rela Kau Pilih Dia"; Rita Sugiarto – "Bagai Bunga Layu"; Selfi Yamma – "Berkali-Kali"; Wulan Permata – "Udang di Balik Batu" | **Best Alternative Dangdut Solo Act**: **Sridevi – "Pada Siapa"**‡; Fildan – "Siang Malam Rindu"; Janna – "Susu Kau Balas Tuba"; Weni Wen – "Belenggu Jiwa"; Wika Salim – "Bagaikan Pohon Tumbang" |
| **Best Dangdut Duo/Group/Collaboration**: **Faul Gayo and Selfi Yamma – "Panggilan Cinta"**‡; Adibal Sahrul and Janna – "CAKA 1 x CAKA 2 X CAKA 3"; Pantura Boys – "Pilih Aku"; Rani Zamala and Rahm Leonando – "Gak Nyambung"; Rani Zamala and Rahm Leonando – "Lembayung Senja" | **Best Electro Dangdut Act**: **Fitri Carlina – "Aku Kangen Kamu"**‡; Azmy Z and Kalia Siska – "Tatangga Kepo"; Duo Serigala – "Sugar Daddy"; Ghea Youbi – "Cinta Tak Bersyarat"; Gunawan – "Stop Hilang-Hilang" |
| **Best Dangdut Songwriter**: **Adibal Sahrul and Yusup Tojiri – "Terkesan" (performed by Lesti)**‡; Adibal Sahrul – "Berkali-Kali" (performed by Selfi Yamma); Hendro Saky – "Pilih Aku" (performed by Pantura Boys); Pasha Ungu – "Bagaikan Pohon Tumbang" (performed by Wika Salim); Toto Anggit – "Siang Malam Rindu" (performed by Fildan) | **Best Dangdut Producer**: **Yusup Tojiri – "Berkali-Kali" (performed by Selfi Yamma)**‡; Arief Iskandar – "Cinta Bukan Logika" (performed by Weni Wen); Hendro Saky – "Menanti Kepastian" (performed by Emi Purnamasari); Ricky Flo – "Siang Malam Rindu" (performed by Fildan); Yusup Tojiri – "Terkesan" (performed by Lesti) |

=== Children's Music ===
| **Best Children's Music Solo Act**: **Mazaya Amania – "Ayam Piyik"**‡; Amora Lemos – "Selalu Bersama"; Jasmine Ayudhya – "Naik Delman"; Lion Jonovan – "Jalani Mimpi"; Pinky Awahita – "Air dan Teh"; Sheemar Rahman Puradiredja – "Yang Mereka Bilang Cinta" | **Best Children's Music Duo/Group/Collaboration**: **Tasya Kamila, Arrasya, Natasha Chairani, Aput, Ria Enes & Susan – "Apa Kabar"**‡; Artis Cilik GNP and Kak Nunuk – "Makan Apa"; Glitter – "Kata Ajaib"; The Bandells – "Berkejar-kejaran"; Arinaga Family – "Kwek Kwek Dance (Tarian Bebek)" |
| **Best Children's Music Songwriter**: **Seli Pontoh – "Apa Kabar" (performed by Tasya Kamila, Arrasya, Natasha Chairani, Aput, Ria Enes & Susan)**‡; Amora Lemos and Caturadi Septembrianto – "Selalu Bersama" (performed by Amora Lemos); Arsha Composer – "Air dan Teh" (performed by Pinky Awahita); Bianca Nelwan and Dimas Wibisana – "Taklukkan Takut" (performed by Nuca and Pamela Ghaniya); Popo Hanoto – "Ayam Piyik" (performed by Mazaya Amania) | **Best Children's Music Producer**: **Donny Prasetyo, Arsha Composer, and Achi Hardjakusumah – "Air dan Teh" (performed by Pinky Awahita)**‡; Amal Bhaskara and Yessi Kristianto – "Jalani Mimpi" (performed by Lion Jonovan); Bianca Nelwan and Dimas Wibisana – "Taklukkan Takut" (performed by Nuca and Pamela Ghaniya); Caturadi Septembrianto – "Selalu Bersama" (performed by Amora Lemos); Dian HP – "Apa Kabar" (performed by Tasya Kamila, Arrasya, Natasha Chairani, Aput, Ria Enes & Susan) |

=== Alternative ===
| **Best Alternative Solo Act**: **Hindia – "Cincin"**‡; Arash Buana – "Take Me Home"; Kunto Aji – "Perjalanan Menawar Racun"; Nadin Amizah – "Di Akhir Perang"; Pamungkas – "One Bad Day" | **Best Alternative Duo/Group/Collaboration**: **Barasuara – "Terbuang dalam Waktu"**‡; Grrrl Gang – "Blue-Stained Lips"; Rumahsakit – "Kabar Bahagia"; The Jansen – "Hanya Ada Kegelapan yang Menunggumu di Sana"; The Lantis – "Halo Jakarta" |
**Best Alternative Album**: **Lagipula Hidup Akan Berakhir – Hindia**‡; About Time – Rumahsakit; Durja Bersahaja – The Jansen; Jalaran Sadrah – Barasuara; Spunky! – Grrrl Gang

=== Keroncong ===
| **Best Original Keroncong/Stambul/Langgam Act**: **Sruti Respati – "Kr. Anak Dara"**‡; Krontjong Toegoe – "Kr. Kartanegara"; Mamiek Marsudi – "Kr. Indonesia Adi Luhur"; Nuswa Keroncong – "Kr. Nusantara"; Tuti Maryati – "Kr. Pangkuan Pertiwi" | **Best Alternative Keroncong/Stambul/Langgam/Extra Act**: **Hetty Koes Endang – "Buih Jadi Permadani"**‡; Alfina Nindiyani and Danuarta – "Urip"; Gading Cenol – "Gemes"; Keroncong Indonesiaku – "Tresnoku"; Krontjong Toegoe – "Jejak Keroncong" |

=== Dance/Electronic ===
| **Best Dance Act**: **Weird Genius featuring Pepita – "Catalyst."**‡; Richard Jersey – "Oke Gas 2"; StarBe – "Rooftop"; Tomatow, SagaB, and Adam Putra – "Throne"; Whisnu Santika, hbrp, and Keebo – "Cartel" | **Best Electronic Act**: **Jevin Julian and Teza Sumendra – "Hard To Leave"**‡; Bleu Clair – "Boom Boom"; Bottlesmoker and Tanayu – "Green Heart of Fire"; CVX and Manutized – "Like Sza"; Muztang and Yacko – "Baddie" |

=== Metal ===
| **Best Metal Act**: **LOGAMULIA – "Hantam Amarah"**‡; Aftercoma – "Petaka"; Bless the Knights – "Parekletos"; Morgensoll – "Maze of Haze"; Revenge The Fate – "Amerta" | **Best Metal Album**: **Distorsi Narasi – LOGAMULIA**‡; AGE OF DOWNFALL – Fornicaras; Endless Panorama – Haunted Era; Ethereal – Hegemony Of God; Tatanan Hitam – Konfliktion |

=== Rap/Hip-Hop ===
| **Best Rap/Hip-Hop Solo Act**: **Tuan Tigabelas – "King"**‡; A. Nayaka – "Marilah Berdansa"; BAP. – "Q4 2021"; Basboi – "Banyak Yang Bilang"; Ben Utomo – "Jakarta Freestyle"; Laze – "Tabah/Gubahanku" | **Best Rap/Hip-hop Duo/Group/Collaboration**: **ENVY* – "Can't Take Me Off"**‡; A. Nayaka featuring Nisya and Basboi – "Manusia"; Ramengvrl and Basboi – "IndoME"; Ramengvrl and Cinta Laura Kiehl – "Bossy"; Tuan Tigabelas and K3bi – "DON'T SLEEP" |

=== Koplo ===
| **Best Koplo Act**: **Masdddho – "Kisinan 2"**‡; Aftershine and Restianade – "Kalah"; Denny Caknan – "Cundamani"; Gildcoustic – "MANOT"; Guyon Waton – "Pelanggaran" | **Best Koplo Songwriter**: **Denny Caknan – "Cundamani" (performed by Denny Caknan)**‡; Ahmad Ridho – "Kisinan 2" (performed by Masdddho); Andika Permana Putra – "Kalah" (performed by Aftershine and Restianade); Bagus Muhammad and Mr. Djo – "Pelanggaran" (performed by Guyon Waton); Gilga Sahid – "MANOT" (performed by Gildcoustic) |

=== Orchestra ===
**Best Orchestral Work**
- **Sherina Munaf, Alvin Witarsa, and Belanegara Abe – "Hadiah Istimewa" (performed by Isyana Sarasvati and Chandra Satria)**‡
  - Achi Hardjakusumah, Ammir Gita, Vito Jr, Viandebas, Housman Pranoto, and Kabul Oktavianus – "Enter The Forest" (performed by Achi Hardjakusumah, Ammir Gita, Vito Jr, Viandebas, Housman Pranoto, and Kabul Oktavianus)
  - Erwin Gutawa – "Kedok" (performed by Erwin Gutawa)
  - Irwan Simanjuntak – "Semua Tak Sama" (performed by Astrid)
  - Ivan Tangkulung – "Belum Berakhir" (performed by Ivan Tangkulung and Giovani Biga)
  - Noni Dju – "Ingar Bingar" (performed by Simfoni Kilas)

=== Visual Media ===
**Best Film Scoring Album**
- **Original Score from Petualangan Sherina 2 – Sherina Munaf**‡
  - 13 Bom di Jakarta: Music From The Motion Picture – Abel Huray
  - Badarawuhi di Desa Penari (Original Motion Picture Score) – Ricky Lionardi
  - Kupu-Kupu Kertas (The Original Score) – Andi Rianto
  - Siksa Kubur (Original Motion Picture Soundtrack) – Aghi Narottama

=== Musical ===
**Best Musical Album**
- **Musikal Keluarga Cemara (Original Cast Recording) – Original Cast Musikal Keluarga Cemara**‡
  - KEN DEDES the Musical (Original Cast Live Recording) – Ara Ajisiwi, Taufan Purbo, and Nala Amrytha
  - Musikal Masih Ada – Ammir Gita, Adpro, and Palka Kojansow
  - Petualangan Sherina 2 (Original Motion Picture Soundtrack) – Sherina Munaf and Derby
  - Teater Musikal Joshua oh Joshua (Original Cast Recording) – Original Cast Teater Musikal Joshua oh Joshua

=== Production Work ===
| **Best Progressive Production Work**: **Achi Hardjakusumah, Ammir Gita, Vito Jr, Viandebas, Housman Pranoto, and Kabul Oktavianus – "Enter The Forest"**‡; Atarashii Natsukashi – "Struktur Simetris I (Candi Tugu)"; Dewa Budjana and Rhoma Irama – "SmaraRindu"; Fuzzy, I – "Metrophone"; SENGAT – "You Are Your Own Slavery" | **Best Reggae/Ska/Rocksteady Production Work**: **Island Vibes, CTTZ, Kamga, and Lawa – "Takkan Abis"**; Momonon – "Ditinggal Teman"; Monkey Boots – "Asa"; Skastra – "Hujan Deras"; Souljah and Skastra – "Libur Sejenak"; Tony Q Rastafara – "Sebelum Terlambat" |
| **Best World Music Production Work**: **Madukina and Matoha Mino – "Dawuh"**‡; Keubitbit – "Raja Taki"; LAIR – "Tatalu"; Sruti Respati – "Kidung Cinta"; Suarasama – "Flying Gambus" | **Best Folk/Country/Ballad Production Work**: **Nadin Amizah – "Semua Aku Dirayakan"**‡; Batas Senja – "Menceritakanmu"; Daun Jatuh – "Kini"; Jason Ranti – "Hari Hari Musik"; Nosstress – "Tunjukkan Cintamu"; Pendarra featuring Dere – "Bermekaran dan Mewangi" |
| **Best Blues Production Work**: **Gugun Blues Shelter – "Bad Politician"**‡; Arya Novanda – "I Can't Stand You Anymore"; Made Mawut – "Climate Blues"; Stonehead – "Hey Sweet Lady"; Syarif Hidayatullah – "Semakin Diam Semakin Tenggelam" | **Best Collaboration Production Work**: **Arsy Widianto and Tiara Andini – "Masih Hatiku"**‡; Andi Rianto and Rony Parulian – "Sepenuh Hati"; Dygta and Kamasean – "Tapi Tahukah Kamu?"; Lyodra and Afgan – "Ada"; Rizky Febian and Mahalini – "Bermuara" |
| **Best Original Soundtrack Production Work**: **Lyodra – "Tak Selalu Memiliki" from Ipar Adalah Maut**‡; Donne Maula – "Bercinta Lewat Kata" from Falling in Love Like in Movies; Fadhilah Intan – "Dawai" from Air Mata di Ujung Sajadah; Sherina Munaf and Derby – "Mengenang Bintang" from Petualangan Sherina 2; Umay Shahab and Natania Karin – "Perayaan Mati Rasa" from Ketika Berhenti di Sini | **Best Vocal Group Production Work**: **Jakarta Movin – "Melompat Lebih Tinggi (Jakarta Movin's Version)"**‡; GAC (Gamaliél Audrey Cantika) – "REALLY REALLY WANT"; JKT48 – "Sayonara Crawl"; KIM – "Tak Mungkin"; StarBe – "Rooftop"; TBA – "U-Uh..." |
| **Best Rearrangement Production Work**: **Andi Rianto – "Sepenuh Hati" (performed by Andi Rianto and Rony Parulian)**‡; Dikta Wicaksono and Fadhlan Darari – "Setia" (performed by Dikta Wicaksono); Irwan Simanjuntak – "Semua Tak Sama" (performed by Astrid); Tito P Soenardi – "Takkan Berpaling DariMu" (performed by Deborah Hanna); Yovie Widianto, Adrian Kitut, and Ari Renaldi – "Cantik" (performed by Arsy Widianto and Tiara Andini) | **Best Regional Language Song Production Work**: **Angga Dermawan – "DOLA"**‡; Abi Rafdi – "Mula Macenning Cappa' Makessing"; Azmy Z and Kalia Siska – "Tatangga Kepo"; Denny Caknan – "Cundamani"; JEF Banjar – "Saranjana" |
| **Best Islamic Spiritual Song Production Work**: **Nissa Sabyan – "Allah Karim"**‡; Budi Doremi – "Ramadhan Penuh Cinta"; Deborah Hanna – "Takkan Berpaling DariMu"; Ungu – "Baik dan Burukmu"; Wali – "Pulang (Robbighfirlii)" | **Best Christian Spiritual Song Production Work**: **Melitha Sidabutar – "Penolong Dalam Kesesakan"**‡; Army of God Worship – "Sejuta Rasa"; GMS Live – "Kau 1,2,3..."; JPCC Worship – "Kau Yang Kuandalkan"; Sudirman Worship, Sidney Mohede – "Ku B'ri Yang Terbaik" |
**Best Instrumental Production Work**: **Dwiki Dharmawan World Peace Orchestra – "The Spirit of Peace"**‡; Adi Darmawan – "Tabbuan Thuk Thuk"; Ali – "Abyadh Aswad"; Jopie Item – "Bersatu Dalam Damai"; Tohpati – "Retro Funk"

=== Production Support ===
| **Best Recording Producer**: **S/EEK – "Bunga Hati" (performed by Salma Salsabil)**‡; Eka Gustiwana and Roy Leonard Soewarno – "Catalyst." (performed by Weird Genius and Pepita); Enrico Octaviano – "Cincin" (performed by Hindia); Laleilmanino – "Boleh Juga" (performed by Salma Salsabil); Sherina Munaf, Alvin Witarsa, and Belanegara Abe – "Hadiah Istimewa" (performed by Isyana Sarasvati and Chandra Satria) | **Best Album Graphic Design**: **Jonathan Andy, Indira Diandra, and Thomas Danes for Eva Celia by Eva Celia**‡; Gandhi Eka – Muchos Libre by Muchos Libre; Iqi Qoror – Pengantar Purifikasi Pikir by Kunto Aji; Ocad – Ode Matahari by Pendarra; Ramzi Firhad – Lagipula Hidup Akan Berakhir by Hindia |
| **Best Sound Production Team**: **Dimas Pradipta – "Bunga Hati" (performed by Salma Salsabil)**‡; Eka Gustiwana and Dhandy Annora – "Catalyst." (performed by Weird Genius and Pepita); Eko Sulistyo and Bennytho Siahaan – "Retro Funk" (performed by Tohpati); Osvaldorio – "Goodnight Kiss (in December)" (performed by Rahmania Astrini); Stevano and Dimas Pradipta – "Selamanya" (performed by Lomba Sihir); Wawaz Akasah – "Tennessee Whiskey" (performed by Cakra Khan) | **Best Music Video**: **Yogi Kusuma – "One Bad Day" by Pamungkas**‡; Aco Tenriyagelli – "Gala Bunga Matahari" by Sal Priadi; Bernardus Raka – "Konsekuens" by .Feast; Chandra Kirana Saputra – "Dinner" by Weda Mauve; Surya Penny – "Jangan Melamun Saat Hujan" by Kunto Aji |

== Multiple nominations and awards ==
The following received multiple awards:

| Awards | Recipient(s) |
|---|---|
| 5 | Salma Salsabil |
| 3 | Bernadya |
| 2 | Achi Hardjakusumah |
| 2 | Aput |
| 2 | Arrasya |
| 2 | Hindia |
| 2 | LOGAMULIA |
| 2 | Natasha Chairani |
| 2 | Ria Enes |
| 2 | S/EEK |
| 2 | Selfi Yamma |
| 2 | Sherina Munaf |
| 2 | Susan |
| 2 | Tasya Kamila |
| 2 | Yusup Tojiri |

The following received multiple nominations:

| Nominations | Recipient(s) |
|---|---|
| 9 | Salma Salsabil |
| 6 | Hindia |
| 6 | Nadin Amizah |
| 6 | Sal Priadi |
| 5 | Bernadya |
| 5 | Maliq & D'Essentials |
| 5 | Sherina Munaf |
| 4 | Andi Rianto |
| 4 | Laleilmanino |
| 4 | Rony Parulian |
| 4 | Selfi Yamma |
| 4 | Tohpati |
| 3 | Achi Hardjakusumah |
| 3 | Adibal Sahrul |
| 3 | Ammir Gita |
| 3 | Amora Lemos |
| 3 | Aput |
| 3 | Arrasya |
| 3 | ArumtaLa |
| 3 | Barasuara |
| 3 | Basboi |
| 3 | Denny Caknan |
| 3 | Fildan |
| 3 | Isyana Sarasvati |
| 3 | Juicy Luicy |
| 3 | Kunto Aji |
| 3 | Lesti |
| 3 | Lyodra |
| 3 | Natasha Chairani |
| 3 | Pepita |
| 3 | Pinky Awahita |
| 3 | Ria Enes |
| 3 | Susan |
| 3 | Tasya Kamila |
| 3 | Teza Sumendra |
| 3 | Tiara Andini |
| 3 | Tuan Tigabelas |
| 3 | Weird Genius |
| 3 | Yusup Tojiri |
