= The Voice Kids Indonesia season 1 =

The Voice Kids Indonesia
- Season 1
- Hosted by: Ananda Omesh; Ersa Mayori
- Coaches: Bebi Romeo; Agnez Mo; Tulus
- Winner: Christopher Edgar
- Winning coach: Tulus
- Runner-up: Raja Giannuca
- Finals venue: Studio 8A, Global TV

Release
- Original network: Global TV
- Original release: August 26 – December 2, 2016

Season chronology
- Next → Season 2

The first season of the Indonesian reality talent show The Voice Kids Indonesia premiered in 2016 on Global TV (currently GTV).

== Coaches & Host ==
=== Coach ===
- Agnez Mo
- Bebi Romeo
- Muhammad Tulus

=== Host ===
- Ananda Omesh
- Ersa Mayori

== Format ==
=== Blind Auditions ===
Each contestant sings on stage, where the coaches (the jury) sit with their backs facing the contestant. In blind audition, the coaches only judge the contestant's voice quality. If the coach likes the contestant's voice, then they will hit their I WANT YOU button which makes the chair rotate towards the stage. Contestants elected by more than one coach must choose a coach to accompany them to the next round.

=== Battle Rounds ===
Any contestant who has been selected by the same coach will be pitted by singing the same song. The coach then will choose a contestant between other contestants who pitted to be able to continue the next round.

=== Live Shows ===
Each contestant will sing 'live' in front of the coach and viewers. In the live shows the entire Indonesian audience will determine which contestants will proceed to the next round through the voting system.

=== Grand Final ===
This round is the final round that will determine the champion of The Voice Kids Indonesia season 1.

== Teams ==
Colour key

- Winner
- Runner-up
- Third place
- Eliminated in the Finals
- Eliminated in the Semifinals
- Eliminated in the Live Shows
- Eliminated in the Battle rounds

Coach	Top 72 artists					
Bebi Romeo						
Bebi Romeo	Tasya Sherin	Rafi Galsa	Fahira Rizani	Kaneishia Yusuf	Auw Genta	Kayla Haura
Bebi Romeo	Sherina Tiwanie	Vavel Indra	Alya Bintang	Brenda Gaby	Christopher Reynard	Dalillah Nurhasanah
Bebi Romeo	Darren Sigly	Don Pedro	Era Bima	Fitri Syahrani	Geisha Sihotang	Ghalih Bagaskoro
Bebi Romeo	Gladys Setiawan	Gracia Angel	Keshya Valerie	Stevanus Ronald	Theresia Dian	William Steve
Agnez Mo						
Agnez Mo	Eygra Sinuhaji	Angelia Domianus	Michelle Tan	Sosila Mega	Abigail Manullang	Jane Callista
Agnez Mo	Michelle Sandrina	Shakira Jasmine	Alif Muhammad	Alsa Aqilah	Carissa Wijaya	Charisa Faith
Agnez Mo	Clarinta Ega	Dhatu Kartika	Dyah Pramesti	Gaizzka Metsu	Indira Pramesti	Monica Christiana
Agnez Mo	Nitya Shamdasani	Rachel Farial	Salma Aliyah	Sandra Kurniawan	Shanti Dewi	Zahra Maulida
Tulus						
Tulus	Christopher Edgar	Raja Giannuca	Shyakira Fatiha	Theresia Gultom	Bintang Danapratapa	Morietnez Azra
Tulus	Muhammad Alde	Steffi Natalie	Antonius Kenny	Aqila Salsabilla	Ariella Rasyida	Ayumi Ramadhani
Tulus	Bernadya Ribka	Gilbert Kurniawan	Jasson Alessandro	Muhammad Suryadi	Michelle Celine	Nabila Mutiara
Tulus	Namira Merani	Nasywa Putri	Rahadila Putri	Reiner Hutauruk	Shem Edbert	Stephanie Daniella

== Blind auditions ==
Color key:

✔	Coach hit his/her "I WANT YOU" button
	Artist defaulted to this coach's team
	Artist elected to join this coach's team
	Artist eliminated with no coach pressing his or her "I WANT YOU" button
	Artist received an "All Turn"

=== Episode 1 (August 26) ===
Order	Artist	Age	Hometown	Song	Coach's and Contestant's Choices		
Order	Artist	Age	Hometown	Song	Bebi Romeo	Agnez Mo	Tulus
1	Tasya	12	Semarang	"Fallin'"	✔	—	—
2	Angela	11	Jakarta	"Bilang Saja"	—	—	—
3	Kayla	10	Aceh	"Bimbang"	✔	✔	✔
4	Reiner	12	Jakarta	"Ceria"	—	—	✔
5	Reink	12	Jakarta	"Wrecking Ball"	—	—	—
6	Charisa	10	Lombok	"Roar"	✔	✔	—
7	Shyakira	13	Pekan Baru	"Cindai"	—	—	✔
8	Jennifer	9	Jakarta	"Pergi ke Bulan"	—	—	—
9	Abigail	13	Medan	"Masterpiece"	✔	✔	—
10	Alsa	13	Semarang	"Somebody to Love"	—	✔	—
11	Bintang	12	Jakarta	"Sewindu"	—	✔	✔
12	Angel	13	Semarang	"No One"	✔	✔	✔

=== Episode 2 (September 2) ===
Order	Artist	Age	Hometown	Song	Coach's and Contestant's Choices		
Order	Artist	Age	Hometown	Song	Bebi Romeo	Agnez Mo	Tulus
1	Shanti	9	Jakarta	"Blank Space"	—	✔	—
2	Reynard	10	Malang	"Rumah Kita"	✔	—	✔
3	Haikal	13	Manado	"Hampa Hatiku"	—	—	—
4	Rachel	11	Jakarta	"The Show"	✔	✔	✔
5	Theresia	14	Jakarta	"Hurricane"	✔	—	✔
6	Kinan	11	Jakarta	"Focus"	—	—	—
7	Fahira	14	Makassar	"Hard to Say I'm Sorry"	✔	—	✔
8	Merylinc	13	Bandung	"The Power of Love	—	—	—
9	Geisha	10	Medan	"The Girl In 14G"	✔	—	✔
10	Alde	11	Bandung	"Kamu"	—	—	✔
11	Arya	11	Bandung	"Aku Cuma Punya Hati"	—	—	—
12	Eygra	10	Medan	"And I Am Telling You I'm Not Going"	✔	✔	✔
13	Don	13	Rote	"Aku Lelakimu"	✔	—	—

=== Episode 3 (September 9) ===
Order	Artist	Age	Hometown	Song	Coach's and Contestant's Choices		
Order	Artist	Age	Hometown	Song	Bebi Romeo	Agnez Mo	Tulus
1	Deven	11	Lombok	"Beat It"	—	—	—
2	Dhatu	10	Jakarta	"As Long As You Love Me"	✔	✔	✔
3	Khunle	12	Solo	"If I Were a Boy"	—	—	—
4	Gilbert	14	Jakarta	"Hanya Untukmu"	—	—	✔
5	Alif	12	Jakarta	"Hapus Aku"	—	✔	—
6	Sabila	11	Bandung	"Sunny (Cinta Pertama)"	—	—	—
7	Namira	9	Yogyakarta	"Lovefool"	—	—	✔
8	Nuca	14	Surakarta	"All of Me	✔	✔	✔
9	Indira	14	Yogyakarta	"Chandelier"	✔	✔	✔
10	Putri	10	Makassar	"Halo"	—	—	—
11	Dalilah	14	Jakarta	"Bawalah Cintaku"	✔	✔	✔
12	Carissa	12	Bandung	"Teenage Dream	✔	✔	✔
13	Fitri	10	Medan	"Break Free"	✔	—	—

=== Episode 4 (September 16) ===
Order	Artist	Age	Hometown	Song	Coach's and Contestant's Choices		
Order	Artist	Age	Hometown	Song	Bebi Romeo	Agnez Mo	Tulus
1	Shem	9	Pekan Baru	"Preman"	—	—	✔
2	Amanda	12	Jakarta	"Umbrella"	—	—	—
3	Era	11	Solo	"Bukan Rayuan Gombal"	✔	—	—
4	Clarinta	14	Jakarta	"Antara Ada dan Tiada"	—	✔	—
5	Anne	10	Yogyakarta	"Fly Me to the Moon"	—	—	—
6	Sosila	11	Jakarta	"Takkan Pernah Ada"	✔	✔	✔
7	Nabila	13	Semarang	"Tiba-tiba Cinta Datang"	✔	✔	✔
8	Genta	14	Semarang	"Billionaire"	✔	—	—
9	Futi	9	Jakarta	"Could It Be"	—	—	—
10	Salma	14	Probolinggo	"To Be with You"	—	✔	✔
11	Yonathan	11	Jakarta	"Rude	—	—	—
12	Rafi	13	Jakarta	"Love of My Life	✔	✔	✔
13	Morie	11	Bandung	"Valerie"	—	✔	✔

=== Episode 5 (23 September) ===
Order	Artist	Age	Hometown	Song	Coach's and Contestant's Choices		
Order	Artist	Age	Hometown	Song	Bebi Romeo	Agnez Mo	Tulus
1	Monica	13	Malang	"Karena Ku Sanggup"	✔	✔	✔
2	Jasson	13	Jakarta	"Televisi"	—	✔	✔
3	Duo Nao	10	Bandung	"Best Friend Forever"	—	—	—
4	Sherina	9	Jakarta	"Kupu-Kupu"	✔	—	—
5	Dian	13	Surabaya	"Mimpi Adalah Harapan"	✔	—	✔
6	Rizky	14	Manado	"Rame-Rame"	—	—	—
7	Jasmine	10	Jakarta	"Cool Kids"	—	—	—
8	William	11	Bekasi	"I Want To Break Free"	✔	—	—
9	Kaneishia	13	Jakarta	"When We Were Young"	✔	—	—
10	Nitya	12	Jakarta	"Bole Chudiyan"	✔	✔	✔
11	Kenny	14	Jakarta	"Lay Me Down"	✔	—	✔
12	Aura	12	Medan	"Girl on Fire"	—	—	—
13	Amest	14	Jakarta	"Give Me One Reason"	✔	✔	✔

=== Episode 6 (30 September) ===
Order	Artist	Age	Hometown	Song	Coach's and Contestant's Choices		
Order	Artist	Age	Hometown	Song	Bebi Romeo	Agnez Mo	Tulus
1	Bagas	10	Medan	"Wild World"	✔	—	—
2	Maisha	9	Jakarta	"Shake It Off"	—	—	—
3	Sandra	12	Bandung	"Kau Adalah"	✔	✔	—
4	Rahadila	13	Bandung	"Heart Attack	—	—	✔
5	Stevanus	11	Maluku	"Januari"	✔	—	—
6	Nasywa	14	Jakarta	"Siapkah Kau Tuk Jatuh Cinta Lagi"	✔	—	✔
7	Novel	10	Jakarta	"Mercy"	—	—	—
8	Vavel	12	Batam	"Saat Terakhir"	✔	✔	✔
9	Jason	10	Salatiga	"It's My Life"	—	—	—
10	Sandrina	12	Medan	"Mamma Knows Best"	✔	✔	✔
11	Karina	12	Jakarta	"Torn"	—	—	—
12	Ayumi	10	Makassar	"Brave"	✔	—	✔
13	Jane	8	Jakarta	"Don't Rain on My Parade"	✔	✔	✔

=== Episode 7 (7 October) ===
Order	Artist	Age	Hometown	Song	Coach's and Contestant's Choices		
Order	Artist	Age	Hometown	Song	Bebi Romeo	Agnez Mo	Tulus
1	Darren	9	Cianjur	"Terhebat"	✔	—	—
2	Jeannie	13	Jakarta	"Because of You"	—	—	—
3	Steffi	13	Tangerang	"Mine"	—	—	✔
4	Gogo	11	Riau	"Butiran Debu"	—	—	—
5	Zahra	12	Semarang	"Harmoni Cinta"	—	✔	—
6	Yadi	12	Banjarmasin	"Dia"	—	—	✔
7	Joceline	12	Jakarta	"Bersamamu"	—	—	—
8	Brenda	14	Pekalongan	"Jangan Kau Bohong"	✔	—	✔
9	Stephanie	14	Jakarta	"Jar of Hearts"	—	—	✔
10	Angelia	13	Jakarta	"Always"	✔	✔	✔
11	Clarissa	14	Makassar	"Titanium"	—	—	—
12	Aqila	13	Jakarta	"Terlalu Lama Sendiri"	—	—	✔
13	Keshya	13	Jakarta	"Serba Salah"	✔	—	—

=== Episode 8 (14 October) ===
Order	Artist	Age	Hometown	Song	Coach's and Contestant's Choices		
Order	Artist	Age	Hometown	Song	Bebi Romeo	Agnez Mo	Tulus
1	Shakira	13	Bandung	"Rather Be"	✔	✔	✔
2	Ariella	13	Jakarta	"Stay"	—	—	✔
3	Edelweis	14	Jakarta	"Waterfalls"	—	—	—
4	Nadya	12	Surabaya	"One And Only"	—	—	✔
5	Florentino	11	Cirebon	"You'll Be in My Heart"	—	—	—
6	Gladys	13	Bogor	"Royals"	✔	—	—
7	Lady	13	Jakarta	"Terlalu Lama"	—	—	—
8	Christopher	13	Bandung	"Grenade"	—	✔	✔
9	Kauzar	13	Makassar	"Bunga Terakhir"	—	—	—
10	Gaizzka	13	Bandung	"Panah Asmara"	✔	✔	✔
11	Alya	11	Boyolali	"Takut"	✔	—	—
12	Celine	12	Malang	"As Long as You There"	—	—	✔
13	Michelle	14	Batam	"Piece of My Heart"	✔	✔	✔

== Battle Rounds ==
Colour key

Artist won the Battle and advanced to the live shows
Artist lost the Battle and was eliminated

Episode	Coach	Order	Winner	Song	Losers	
Episode 9 (October 21)	Agnez Mo	1	Abigail Manullang	"I Put a Spell on You"	Dyah Pramesti	Salma Zakiyya
Episode 9 (October 21)	M. Tulus	2	Theresia Gultom	"Love Yourself"	Antonius Kenny	Bernadya Ribka
Episode 9 (October 21)	Bebi Romeo	3	Vavel Indra	"Bila Rasaku Ini Rasamu"	Christopher Reynard	Era Bima
Episode 9 (October 21)	M. Tulus	4	Shyakira Fatiha	"Semua Jadi Satu"	Ariella Rasyida	Nasywa Putri
Episode 9 (October 21)	Agnez Mo	5	Shakira Jasmine	"Almost Is Never Enough"	Dhatu Kartika	Indira Pramesti
Episode 9 (October 21)	M. Tulus	6	Bintang Danapratapa	"Mengejar Matahari"	Jasson Alessandro	Muhammad Suryadi
Episode 9 (October 21)	Bebi Romeo	7	Kaneishia Yusuf	"All I Ask"	Dalillah Nurhasanah	Theresia Dian
Episode 9 (October 21)	Agnez Mo	8	Eygra Sinuhaji	"How to Love"	Alsa Aqilah	Zahra Nasima
Episode 10 (October 28)	Agnez Mo	1	Sosila Mega	"Gravity"	Monica Christiana	Sandra Kurniawan
Episode 10 (October 28)	Bebi Romeo	2	Fahira Rizani	"Irreplaceable"	Gracia Angel	Brenda Croeylin
Episode 10 (October 28)	Tulus	3	Raja Giannuca	"The Man Who Can't Be Moved"	Stephanie Daniella	Gilbert Kurniawan
Episode 10 (October 28)	Agnez Mo	4	Michelle Sandrina	"Domino"	Nitya Shamdasani	Carissa Wijaya
Episode 10 (October 28)	Bebi Romeo	5	Sherina Tiwanie	"Untuk Sahabat"	Geisha Sihotang	Fitri Syahrani
Episode 10 (October 28)	Agnez Mo	6	Angelia Domianus	"Stuttering"	Gaizzka Metsu	Clarinta Ega
Episode 10 (October 28)	Tulus	7	Muhammad Alde	"#eeeaa"	Shem Edbert	Reiner Hutauruk
Episode 10 (October 28)	Bebi Romeo	8	Kayla Haura	"Bahagia"	Darren Sigly	William Steve
Episode 11 (November 4)	Bebi Romeo	1	Auw Genta	"Mahadewi"	Don Pedro	Stevanus
Episode 11 (November 4)	Agnez Mo	2	Michelle Tan	"Just Give Me A Reason	Charisa Faith	Alif Muhammad
Episode 11 (November 4)	Bebi Romeo	3	Tasya Sherin	"Don't Let Me Down"	Keshya Valerie	Gladys Setiawan
Episode 11 (November 4)	Tulus	4	Steffi Natalie	"Dekat Di Hati"	Nabila Mutiara	Aqila Salsabilla
Episode 11 (November 4)	Agnez Mo	5	Jane Callista	"The Sound of Music"	Rachel Farial	Shanti Dewi
Episode 11 (November 4)	Tulus	6	Morietnez Azra	"Sahabat Setia"	Ayumi Ramadhani	Namira Merani
Episode 11 (November 4)	Bebi Romeo	7	Rafi Galsa	"Bohemian Rhapsody"	Alya Bintang	Ghalih Bagaskoro
Episode 11 (November 4)	Tulus	8	Christopher Edgar	"Treasure	Michelle Celine	Rahadila Putri

== Live Shows ==
Color key

Artist was saved by the Public's votes
Artist was saved by the Coach's choices
Artist was eliminated

=== Live Show 1 ===
Episode	Coach	Order	Artist	Song	Result
Episode 12 (November 11)	Agnez Mo	1	Abigail Manullang	"Telephone"	Eliminated
Episode 12 (November 11)	Agnez Mo	2	Angelia Domianus	"I Don't Want to Miss a Thing	Agnez's choice
Episode 12 (November 11)	Agnez Mo	3	Michelle Tan	"FourFiveSeconds"	Public's vote
Episode 12 (November 11)	Agnez Mo	4	Jane Callista	"Secret Admirer"	Eliminated
Episode 12 (November 11)	Bebi Romeo	5	Auw Genta	"Lost Boy	Eliminated
Episode 12 (November 11)	Bebi Romeo	6	Rafi Galsa	"Stairway to Heaven"	Public's vote
Episode 12 (November 11)	Bebi Romeo	7	Fahira Rizani	"Stone Cold"	Bebi's choice
Episode 12 (November 11)	Bebi Romeo	8	Sherina Tiwanie	"I Want You Back"	Eliminated
Episode 12 (November 11)	Tulus	9	Christopher Edgar	"Angel"	Public's vote
Episode 12 (November 11)	Tulus	10	Muhammad Alde	"Seberapa Pantas"	Eliminated
Episode 12 (November 11)	Tulus	11	Bintang Danapratapa	"Overjoyed	Eliminated
Episode 12 (November 11)	Tulus	12	Theresia Gultom	"Don't Dream It's Over"	Tulus' choice

Non-competition Performances
Order	Performers	Song
1	All Finalist	"Di Atas Awan"
2	Naura	"Bully"

=== Live Show 2 ===
Episode	Coach	Order	Artist	Song	Result
Episode 13 (November 18)	Bebi Romeo	1	Tasya Sherin	"Feeling Good"	Bebi's choice
Episode 13 (November 18)	Agnez Mo	2	Sosila Mega	"The Only Exception"	Agnez Mo's choice
Episode 13 (November 18)	Tulus	3	Steffi Natalie	"Pelangi"	Eliminated
Episode 13 (November 18)	Agnez Mo	4	Shakira Jasmine	"Impossible"	Eliminated
Episode 13 (November 18)	Bebi Romeo	5	Kaneishia Yusuf	"When I Was Your Man"	Public's vote
Episode 13 (November 18)	Agnez Mo	6	Michelle Sandrina	"Single Ladies"	Eliminated
Episode 13 (November 18)	Tulus	7	Raja Giannuca	"Let It Go"	Public's vote
Episode 13 (November 18)	Bebi Romeo	8	Vavel Indra Valvont	"Dealova"	Eliminated
Episode 13 (November 18)	Agnez Mo	9	Eygra Sinuhaji	"Ain't No Sunshine"	Public's vote
Episode 13 (November 18)	Tulus	10	Morietnez Azra	"Send My Love (To Your New Lover)"	Eliminated
Episode 13 (November 18)	Bebi Romeo	11	Kayla Haura	"Broken Vow"	Eliminated
Episode 13 (November 18)	Tulus	12	Shyakira Fatiha	"Bayang Bayang Ilusi"	Tulus' choice

Non-competition Performance
Order	Performers	Song
1	All Finalist	"Don't Stop Believin'"
2	Vidi Aldiano	"Let Me Love You" and "Can't Stop The Feeling"

=== Semifinals ===
Episode	Coach	Order	Artist	Song	Result
Episode 15 (November 25)	Tulus	1	Christopher Edgar	"Set Fire to the Rain"	Tulus' choice
Episode 15 (November 25)	Tulus	2	Shyakira Fatiha	"Bahasa Kalbu"	Eliminated
Episode 15 (November 25)	Tulus	3	Theresia Gultom	"Crash Your Party"	Eliminated
Episode 15 (November 25)	Tulus	4	Raja Giannuca	"Malam Biru"	Public's vote
Episode 15 (November 25)	Bebi Romeo	5	Tasya Sherin	"Creep"	Bebi's choice
Episode 15 (November 25)	Bebi Romeo	6	Fahira Rizani	"I Hate Myself for Loving You"	Eliminated
Episode 15 (November 25)	Bebi Romeo	7	Rafi Galsa	"You Shook Me All Night Long"	Public's vote
Episode 15 (November 25)	Bebi Romeo	8	Kaneishia Yusuf	"Make You Feel My Love"	Eliminated
Episode 15 (November 25)	Agnez Mo	9	Angelia Domianus	"Side to Side"	Agnez's choice
Episode 15 (November 25)	Agnez Mo	10	Michelle Tan	"Have You Ever Seen the Rain?"	Eliminated
Episode 15 (November 25)	Agnez Mo	11	Eygra Sinuhaji	"I Can't Let Go"	Public's vote
Episode 15 (November 25)	Agnez Mo	12	Sosila Mega	"Don't Know Why "	Eliminated

Non-competition Performance
Order	Performer	Song
1	All Finalist	"Best Song Ever"

=== Finals (December 2) ===
==== Final ====
Coach	Order	Artist	Song	Result
Bebi Romeo	1	Rafi Galsa	"Jealousy"	Eliminated
Agnez Mo	2	Angelia Domianus	"Hurt"	Eliminated
Tulus	3	Raja Giannuca	"Seperti Yang Kau Minta"	Advanced
Agnez Mo	4	Eygra Sinuhaji	"Confessions of a Broken Heart (Daughter to Father)"	Eliminated
Tulus	5	Christopher Edgar	"Writing's on the Wall"	Advanced
Bebi Romeo	6	Tasya Sherin	"Nothing Else Matters"	Advanced

==== Grand Final ====
Coach	Order	Artist	Song	Voting Result	Result
Tulus	1	Raja Giannuca	"Thinking Out Loud"	38.89%	Runner-up
Bebi Romeo	2	Tasya Sherin	"The House of the Rising Sun"	21.44%	Third Place
Tulus	3	Christopher Edgar	"Fix You"	39.67%	Winner

Non-competition Performances
Order	Performers	Song
1	Bebi Romeo, Agnez Mo, Tulus	"Crazy"
2	Tulus & His Finalist (Christopher Edgar and Dru Nuca)	"Please Don't Talk About Me When I'm Gone"
3	Agnez Mo & Her Finalist (Angelia Domianus and Eygra Sinuhaji)	"If I Ain't Got You"
4	Bebi Romeo & His Finalist (Rafi Galsa and Tasya Sherin)	"I Love Rock 'n' Roll"
5	Elha Nympha (with Tasya Sherin, Rafi Galsa, Angelia Domianus, Eygra Sinuhaji, Christopher Edgar, and Raja Giannuca)	"I'm in Love with a Monster"
6	Elha Nympha	"Emotions"

== Elimination Chart ==
=== Overall ===
Color key
Artist's info

- Team Bebi
- Team Agnez Mo
- Team Tulus

Result details

- Winner
- Runner-up
- Third Place
- Saved by his/her coach
- Saved by public
- Eliminated
- Not perform in that week

Live show results per week
Artist	Week 1	Week 2	Semi-Final	Finals	
Artist	Week 1	Week 2	Semi-Final	Final	Grand Final
Christopher Edgar	Safe		Safe	Safe	Winner
Dru Nuca		Safe	Safe	Safe	Runner-up
Tasya Sherin		Safe	Safe	Safe	Third Place
Angelia Domianus	Safe		Safe	Eliminated	Eliminated (Final)
Eygra Sinuhaji		Safe	Safe	Eliminated	Eliminated (Final)
Rafi Galsa	Safe		Safe	Eliminated	Eliminated (Final)
Fahira Rizani	Safe		Eliminated	Eliminated (Semi-Finals)	
Kaneishia Yusuf		Safe	Eliminated	Eliminated (Semi-Finals)	
Michelle Tan	Safe		Eliminated	Eliminated (Semi-Finals)	
Shyakira Fatiha		Safe	Eliminated	Eliminated (Semi-Finals)	
Sosila Mega		Safe	Eliminated	Eliminated (Semi-Finals)	
Theresia Gultom	Safe		Eliminated	Eliminated (Semi-Finals)	
Kayla Haura		Eliminated	Eliminated (Week 2)		
Michelle Sandrina		Eliminated	Eliminated (Week 2)		
Morietnez Azra		Eliminated	Eliminated (Week 2)		
Shakira Jasmine		Eliminated	Eliminated (Week 2)		
Steffi Natalie		Eliminated	Eliminated (Week 2)		
Vavel Indra Valvont		Eliminated	Eliminated (Week 2)		
Abigail Manullang	Eliminated	Eliminated (Week 1)			
Auw Genta	Eliminated	Eliminated (Week 1)			
Bintang Danapratapa	Eliminated	Eliminated (Week 1)			
Jane Callista	Eliminated	Eliminated (Week 1)			
Muhammad Alde	Eliminated	Eliminated (Week 1)			
Sherina Tiwanie	Eliminated	Eliminated (Week 1)			

=== Team ===
Color key
Artist's info

- Team Bebi
- Team Agnez Mo
- Team Tulus

Result details

- Winnee
- Runner-up
- Third Place
- Eliminated

Artist	Week 1	Week 2	Week 3	Finals	
Artist	Week 1	Week 2	Week 3	Top 8	Top 4
Tasya Sherin	—N/a	Coach's Choice	Coach's Choice	Advanced	Third Place
Rafi Galsa	Public's Vote	—N/a	Public's Vote	Eliminated	
Fahira Rizani	Coach's Choice	—N/a	Eliminated		
Kaneishia Yusuf	—N/a	Public's Vote	Eliminated		
Kayla Haura	—N/a	Eliminated			
Vavel Simanjuntak	—N/a	Eliminated			
Sherina Tiwanie	Eliminated				
Auw Genta	Eliminated				
Angelia Domianus	Coach's Choice	—N/a	Coach's Choice	Eliminated	
Eygra Sinuhaji	—N/a	Public's Vote	Public's Vote	Eliminated	
Michelle Tan	Public's Vote	—N/a	Eliminated		
Sosila Mega	—N/a	Coach's Choice	Eliminated		
Shakira Jasmine	—N/a	Eliminated			
Michelle Sandrina	—N/a	Eliminated			
Abigail Manullang	Eliminated				
Jane Callista	Eliminated				
Christopher Edgar	Public's Vote	—N/a	Coach's Choice	Advanced	Winner
Raja Giannuca	—N/a	Public's Vote	Public's Vote	Advanced	Runner-up
Theresia Gultom	Coach's Choice	—N/a	Eliminated		
Shyakira Fatiha	—N/a	Coach's Choice	Eliminated		
Steffi Natalie	—N/a	Eliminated			
Morienez Azra	—N/a	Eliminated			
Bintang Danapratapa	Eliminasi				
Muhammad Alde	Eliminated				

== Contestants who appeared on previous shows ==
- Alif, Angelia, Auw Genta, Bagas, Bintang, Jane, Kayla, Namira and Zahra were on the first season of Indonesian Idol Junior in 2014, but failed to get into the Spectacular Shows round.
- Vavel and Moriet were on the first season of Indonesian Idol Junior in 2014, but were eliminated in the Amnesti rounds.
- Gaza, Sabilla, and Sherina were on the first season of La Academia Junior Indonesia in 2014, and were eliminated in the Semifinals.
- Shakira and Keshya was on the first season of La Academia Junior Indonesia in 2014, and were eliminated in the Top 10 and Top 7, respectively.
- Rafi was on the Second season of Indonesia's Got Talent in 2014 as part of a Family Band, and was eliminated in the Top 12.
- Alsa was on the fourth season of Idola Cilik in 2013 and was eliminated in the Menuju Pentas round.
- Salma was on the fourth season of Idola Cilik in 2013 and was eliminated in the Top 9.
- Trifena and Trifosa (Duo Nao) were on the fourth season of Idola Cilik in 2013 and were eliminated in the Audition round and the Top 13, respectively.
- Eygrha was on the fifth season of Idola Cilik in 2016 and was eliminated in the Audition round.
- Maisha and Monica were on the fifth season of Idola Cilik in 2016 and was eliminated in the Menuju Pentas round.
- Alde was on the fifth season of Idola Cilik in 2016 and was eliminated in the Top 15 round.
- Michelle Sandrina was on the second season of Indonesia Mencari Bakat 2 in 2011, where she was eliminated in the Semifinals, and the first Season of Indonesian Idol Junior in 2014 where she failed to get into the Spectacular Shows round.
- Raja Giannuca was on the fourth season of Indonesia Mencari Bakat 4 in 2014 and was eliminated in the Top 4.
