= Napitupulu =

Batak surname originating in Indonesia

Napitupulu is one of Toba Batak clans originating in North Sumatra, Indonesia. People of this clan bear the clan's name as their surname. Notable people of this clan include:

- Christopher Edgar Napitupulu (born 2002), Indonesian singer
- Jimmy Napitupulu (born 1966), Indonesian football referee
