= Kita Bikin Romantis =

Single by Maliq & D'Essentials
- Language: Indonesian
- Released: 8 March 2024
- Genre: Pop
- Length: 3:56
- Label: Warner
- Songwriter: Widi Puradiredja

Maliq & D'Essentials singles chronology
| "Aduh" (2023) | "Kita Bikin Romantis" (2024) | "Kumpul Bocah" (2025) |

Music video
- "Kita Bikin Romantis" on YouTube

"Kita Bikin Romantis" (English: "Let's Make It Romantic") is a song recorded by the Indonesian band Maliq & D'Essentials. Written by drummer Widi Puradiredja, it was released by Warner Music Indonesia on 8 March 2024. A snippet of the song went viral on TikTok days prior, and subsequently entered number 7 on Billboard Indonesia Songs chart.

Initially a standalone single, "Kita Bikin Romantis" was included on their ninth studio album Can Machines Fall in Love?, released on 30 May 2024.

== Background and release ==
Prior to its official release, a 30-second snippet of "Kita Bikin Romantis" went viral on the social networking platform TikTok on 28 February 2024. The song was released on 8 March, followed by an accompanying music video, which was released on 4 April.

== Personnel ==
Credits adapted from Apple Music.

- Maliq & D'Essentials – producer
  - Angga Puradiredja – vocals, recording engineer, mixing
  - Indah Wisnuwardhana – vocals
  - Dendy Sukarno – bass, recording engineer, mixing
  - Widi Puradiredja – songwriting, drums, programming, bass
  - Arya Aditya Ramadhya – guitar
  - Ilman Ibrahim – keyboards
- Geoff – mastering

== Reception ==
"Kita Bikin Romantis" received generally mixed reviews from critics. Dicky Ardian, writing for Detik Pop, described "Kita Bikin Romantis" as "cringe".

== Charts ==
Chart performance
| Chart | Peak position |
|---|---|
| Indonesia (Billboard) | 7 |

== Awards and nominations ==
At the 27th Annual Anugerah Musik Indonesia, the song won the Best Pop Duo or Group for Maliq & D'Essentials.
