= Vira Talisa =

Indonesian singer-songwriter (born 1993)

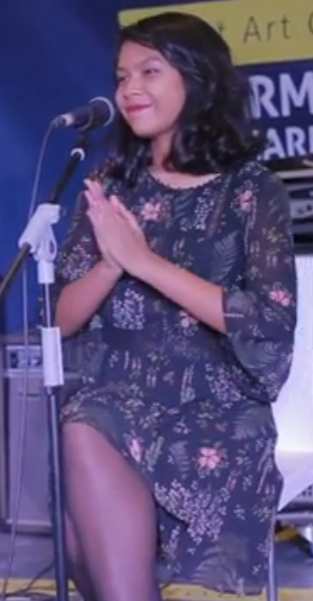
- Performing in 2016
- Born: Vira Talisa Dharmawan; 9 August 1993 (age 33); Jakarta, Indonesia
- Occupations: Singer; songwriter
- Musical career
- Genres: pop urban; French pop
- Instrument: Vocals
- Years active: 2016–present
- Labels: Dominion; Orange Cliff

Vira Talisa Dharmawan (born 9 August 1993) is an Indonesian singer-songwriter. She has released two studio albums Primavera (2019) and Bloomingtale (2023), also a self-titled extended play in 2016. She has received four Anugerah Musik Indonesia nominations, including Best New Artist in 2017.

== Career ==
In 2012, Talisa started her musical career by uploading covers on her SoundCloud account. After graduating with a degree in visual arts from the University of Rennes in 2016, she began recording original material while interning. She came back to Indonesia and released her self-titled extended play in December 2016. She received her first Anugerah Musik Indonesia nomination for Best New Artist in 2017.

Talisa released her first track in Indonesian, "Janji Wibawa" in April 2018. It served as the lead single of her then-upcoming debut studio album. In May 2018, Talisa received the Alumni Award for Young Talent by the Embassy of France in Indonesia. In March 2019, she released her debut studio album Primavera.

In 2022, she signed a recording contract with Dominion Records, a sub-division of Universal Music Indonesia, and released a single "Mejikuhibiniu" with rapper Laze. She received a nomination at the 2022 Anugerah Musik Indonesia for Best Contemporary Jazz Act for "Makna Nostalgia". In September 2023, she released her sophomore studio album, Bloomingtale. She received a nomination at the 27th Annual Anugerah Musik Indonesia for Best Contemporary Jazz Act for "Like It Was Meant to Be".

== Personal life ==
In November 2023, she married recording producer Raditya Joko Bramantyo.

== Discography ==
=== Studio albums ===
| Title | Details |
|---|---|
| Primavera | Released: 1 March 2019; Label: Independent |
| Bloomingtale | Released: 22 September 2023; Label: Dominion |

=== Extended plays ===
| Title | Details |
|---|---|
| Vira Talisa | Released: 2 December 2016; Label: Orange Cliff |

=== Singles ===
As lead artist

| Title | Year | Album |
|---|---|---|
| "Walking Back Home" | 2016 | Vira Talisa |
| "Janji Wibawa" | 2018 | Primavera |
| "Down in Vieux Cannes" | 2018 | Primavera |
| "Oh Sunny Days" | 2021 | Non-album singles |
| "Secret Admirer" (featuring Arina Ephipania of Mocca) | 2021 | Non-album singles |
| "Sweet Dream, Sweet Little Thing" (with Meda Kawu) | 2021 | Non-album singles |
| "Mejikuhibiniu" (with Laze) | 2022 | Bloomingtale |
| "Turn the Lights On" (with TOMGGG) | 2022 | superposition |
| "Samba Di Kota" | 2022 | Bloomingtale |
| "A Weekend Song for Me and You" (with Dead Bachelors) | 2023 | Special |

As featured artist

| Title | Year | Album |
|---|---|---|
| "Rubber Song" (Sore featuring Vira Talisa) | 2019 | Mevrouw |
| "Liburan Indie" (Endah N Rhesa featuring Vira Talisa) | 2020 | Non-album singles |
| "Panggilan Jiwa" (Chiki Fawzi featuring Meda Kawu and Vira Talisa) | 2020 | Non-album singles |
| "Morning Sun" (Duara featuring Vira Talisa) | 2021 | Non-album singles |
| "I Wish You Love" (Dua Empat with Hansen Arief and Joshua Alexander featuring Vira Talisa) | 2023 | Some of My Best Friends Are Jazz Cats! |

=== Guest appearances ===
| Title | Year | Other artist(s) | Album |
|---|---|---|---|
| "Selimut Kota" | 2019 | —N/a | Senandung Energi Bumi |
| "Lagu Cinta Untuk Dunia" | 2019 | Bilal Indrajaya | Purnama |
| "Dunia Yang Ternoda" | 2021 | ADORIA | Lagu Baru dari Masa Lalu, Vol. 1 |
| "Makna Nostalgia" | 2022 | —N/a | Detik Waktu #2 : Perjalanan Karya Cipta Candra Darusman |

== Awards and nominations ==
| Award | Year | Category | Nominee(s) | Result | Ref. |
|---|---|---|---|---|---|
| Anugerah Musik Indonesia | 2017 | Best New Artist | "Walking Back Home" | Nominated | |
| Anugerah Musik Indonesia | 2022 | Best Contemporary Jazz Act | "Makna Nostalgia" | Nominated | |
| Anugerah Musik Indonesia | 2023 | Best Jazz Act | "I Wish You Love" (shared with Dua Empat, Hansen Arief, and Joshua Alexander) | Nominated | |
| Anugerah Musik Indonesia | 2024 | Best Jazz Act | "Like It Was Meant to Be" | Nominated | |
