= Kaneishia Yusuf =

Indonesian singer and actress

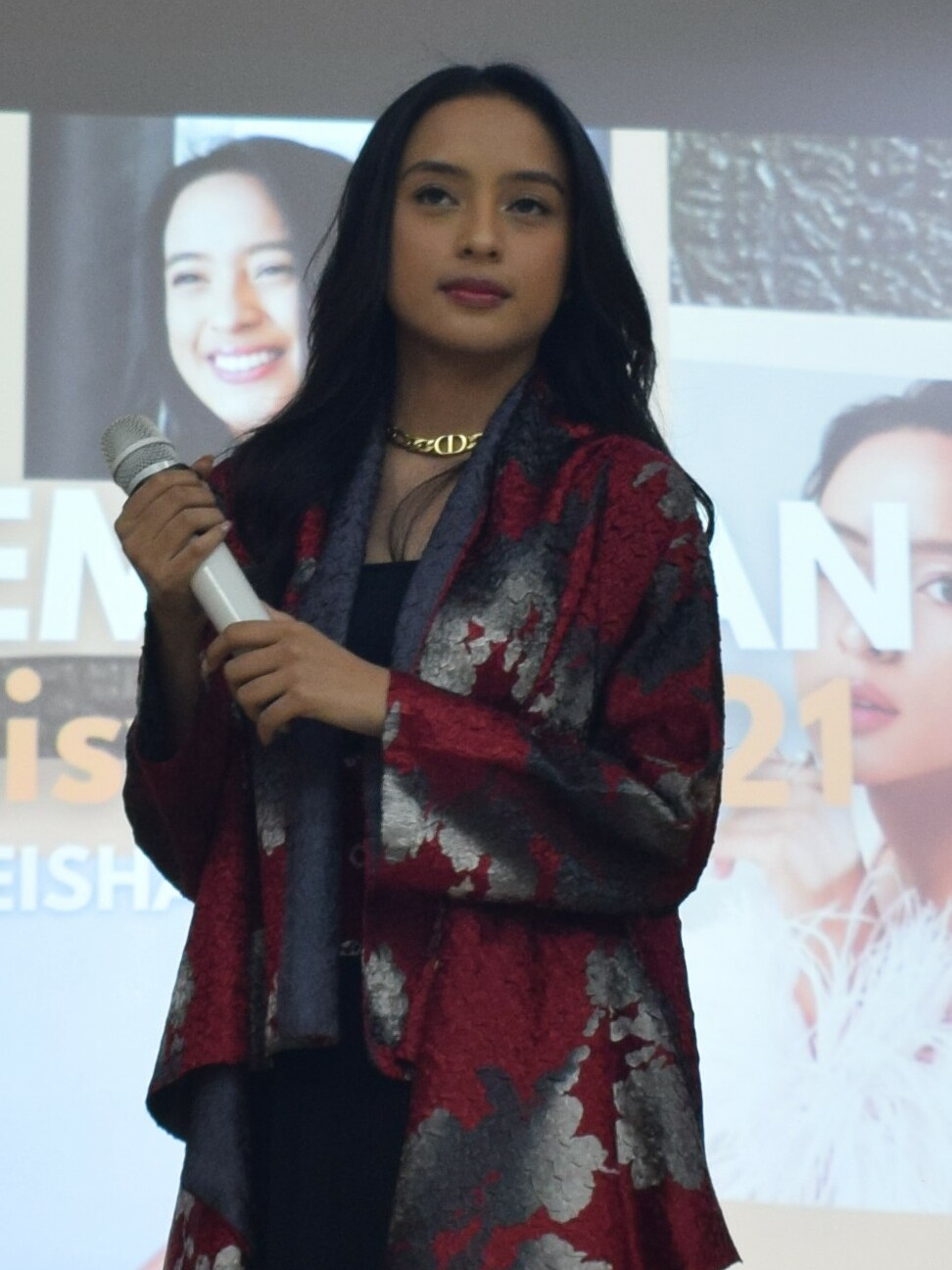
- Born: Kaneishia Lathifa Zahra; September 5, 2002 (age 24); Jakarta, Indonesia
- Other name: Kaneishia Yusuf
- Education: Universitas Indonesia
- Occupations: Singer; actress
- Years active: 2014—now
- Father: Dede Yusuf

Kaneishia Lathifa Zahra (née Yusuf; born 5 September 2002), is an Indonesian singer and actress. She is known for her participation in season 1 of The Voice Kids Indonesia which was aired on GTV in 2016.

== Early life ==
Kaneishia is the youngest of two children of Dede Yusuf and Sendy Ramania Wurandani. Her father is an actor and politician. She has an older sister named Alifiya Arkana Paramita.

She studied at Al-Izhar Pondok Labu Elementary School and Junior High School. She then enrolled at SMA Negeri 8 Jakarta. Upon graduating from high school, she began studying international relations at the University of Indonesia.

== Career ==
Kaneishia started her career as a solo singer. In 2016, she took part in the singing talent search event of The Voice Kids Indonesia season 1. During the competition, she joined the Bebi Romeo team and managed to get through to the semi-finals.

After completing the competition, she entered the world of acting by starring in the musical drama series Sound of My Life which premiered on Global TV on 5 August 2017.

In 2019, she played in the film DoReMi & You as her acting debut. In 2021, she also played a role in Kisah untuk Geri.

=== Appearance on The Voice Kids Indonesia ===
Round	Date	Songs & Artists	Result	Ref.
Blind Audition	23 September 2016	"When We Were Young" — Adele	Couch Bebi Romeo pressed the button	
Combat Round (vs Dalillah Nurhasanah & Theresia Dian Suci Gantari)	21 October 2016	"All I Ask"—Adele	Passed	
Live Performances	18 November 2016	"When I Was Your Man" — Bruno Mars	Passed (public choice)	
Semi-final	25 November 2016	"Make You Feel My Love" — Adele	Eliminated	

== Filmography ==
=== Film ===
Year	Title	Role	Notes
2019	DoReMi & You	Tania	Karya debut
2024	Munkar	Siti	
2024	Laura: A True Story of a Fighter	Shasa	
2025	Pembantaian Dukun Santet		

Explanation

Not released yet
- TBA: To be announced

=== Web series ===
Year	Title	Role	Notes
2021	Kisah untuk Geri	Nataya	
2021	Teluk Alaska	Bulan	
2022	Percaya Ini Cinta	Jessica	
2023	5 Detik & Rasa Rindu	Kanya	

=== TV Series ===
Year	Title	Role	Notes
2022	Cerita Putih Abu-Abu	Ayu	

=== TV shows ===
Year	Title	Role	Notes
2016, 2017	The Voice Kids Indonesia	Participant	Season 1
2016, 2017	The Voice Kids Indonesia	Social presenter	Season 2
2016	The Reunion	Performer	
2019	Famili 100	Participant	Tim And You
2023	FWB	Guest star	

=== Musical drama ===
- Kita Semua Satu (2014)
- Sound of My Life (2017)
- Aruh Baharin (2019)

=== Television film ===
- Semua Bisa Jadi Mantan, Tapi Mba Dokter Jangan (2023)

== Discography ==
=== Compilation album ===
- Aku Anak Indonesia (2018)

=== Singles ===
Title	Year	Album
"Nusantara (2)"	2018	Aku Anak Indonesia
"Selayaknya Manusia"	2021	Non-album singles
"Putih Abu-Abu"	2022	Non-album singles
"Dalam Jagamu" (with Hanif Andarevi)	2023	Non-album singles
