= Terbuang dalam Waktu =

2023 song by Barasuara

Single by Barasuara
- Language: Indonesian
- Released: 8 August 2023
- Genre: Rock
- Length: 4:39
- Label: Hu Shah
- Composer: Gerald Situmorang
- Lyricists: Iga Massardi; Asteriska

Barasuara singles chronology
"Merayakan Fana" (2023)	"Terbuang dalam Waktu" (2023)

"Terbuang dalam Waktu" (English: "Thrown Back in Time") is a song recorded by the Indonesian band Barasuara. Composed by bassist Gerald Situmorang and penned by vocalists Iga Massardi and Asteriska, it was released by Hu Shah Records on 8 August 2023.

Initially a standalone single, "Terbuang dalam Waktu" was included on Barasuara's third studio album, Jalanan Sadrah, released on 21 June 2024.

== Commercial performance ==
"Terbuang dalam Waktu" debuted at number eleven on Billboard Indonesia Songs chart dated 26 July 2025, then peaked at number one on chart dated 2 August.

== Charts ==
Charts
Charts	Peak position
Indonesia (Billboard)	1

== Accolades ==
At the 27th Annual Anugerah Musik Indonesia, "Terbuang dalam Waktu" won the Best Alternative Duo, Group, Vocal Group or Collaboration. The song also won the Best Theme Song category at the 2025 Indonesian Film Festival, leading to controversy.

== Usage in media ==
In 2025, "Terbuang dalam Waktu" was used as a theme song for the film Sore: A Wife from the Future.
