= Laura (2024 film) =

- Theatrical release poster
- Directed by: Hanung Bramantyo
- Screenplay by: Alim Sudio
- Story by: Edelenyi Laura Anna
- Produced by: Manoj Punjabi
- Starring: Amanda Rawles; Kevin Ardilova; Carissa Perusset; Fadi Alaydrus; Fachrul Hadid; Rafly Altama Putra
- Cinematography: Saudi Utama
- Edited by: Ryan Purwoko
- Music by: Ricky Lionardi
- Production companies: MD Pictures; Dapur Film
- Release dates: September 12, 2024 (Indonesia); September 26, 2024 (Malaysia)
- Running time: 104 minutes
- Country: Indonesia
- Languages: Indonesian; Hungarian

Laura is a 2024 Indonesian drama film directed and written by Hanung Bramantyo. The film was produced by Manoj Punjabi with MD Pictures. It starred Amanda Rawles, Kevin Ardilova, Carissa Perusset, and Fadi Alaydrus.

== Cast ==
- Amanda Rawles as Edelényi Laura Anna
- Kevin Ardilova as Jonathan Gunandi (Jojo)
- Carissa Perusset as Edelényi Greta Irene
- Fadi Alaydrus as Riko
- Fachrul Hadid as Sony
- Rafly Altama as RaflyMa
- Jinan Safa Safira as Amy
- Kaneishia Yusuf as Shasa
- Muhammad Fauzan as Janos
- Michelle Yuri as Petra
- Unique Priscilla as Laura Mother
- Willem Bevers as Laura Father
- Marella as Heni
- Ony Serojawati Hafiedz as Jojo Mother
- Pascal Azhar as Jojo Father

== Release ==
Laura was released theatrically in Indonesia, on 12 September 2024.

== Reception ==
Laura reached 1 million viewers in nine days of screening.
