= Dede Yusuf =

Indonesian actor and politician (born 1966)

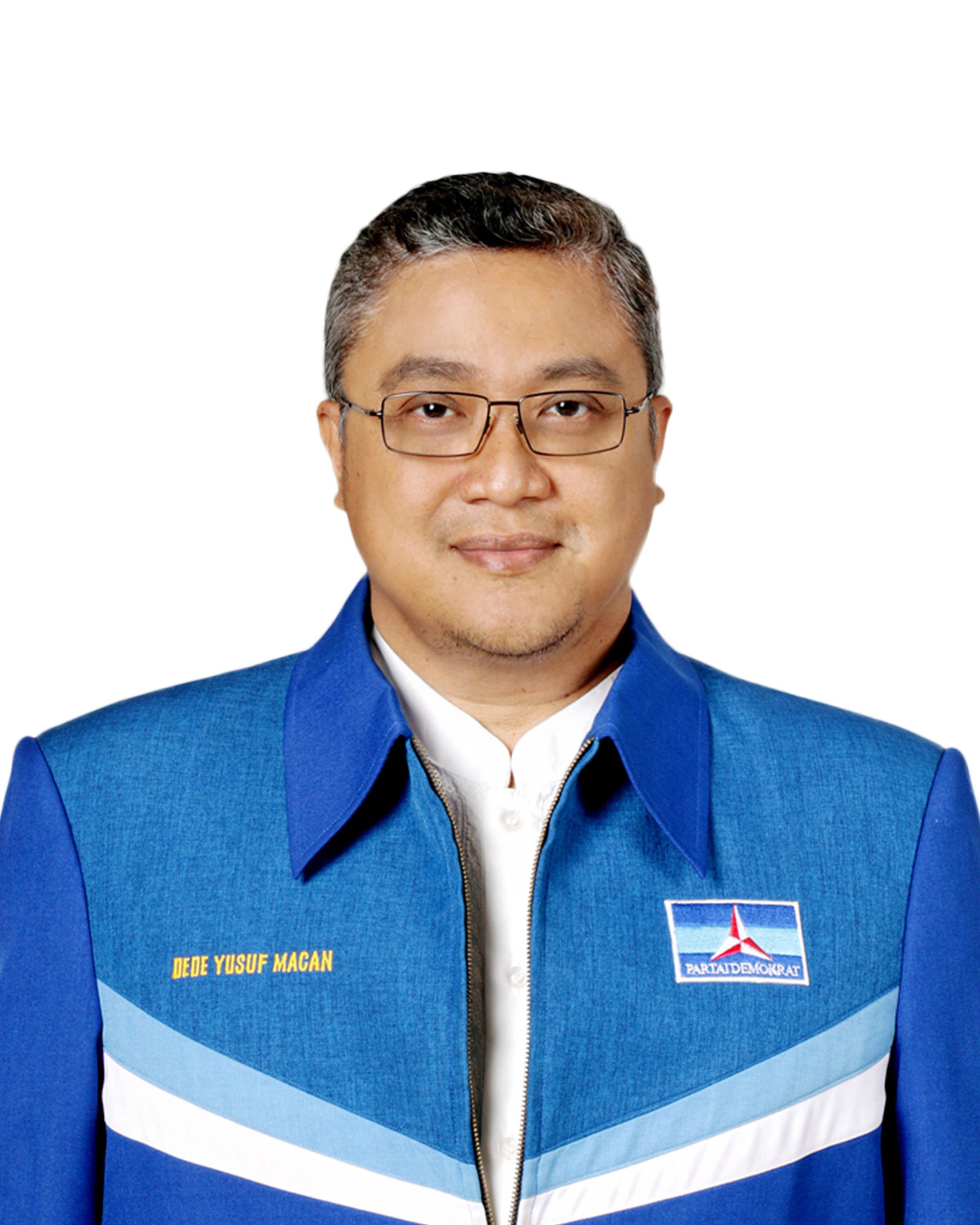
- Portrait of Dede Yusuf

Vice Governor of West Java
- In office 13 June 2008 – 13 June 2013
- President: Susilo Bambang Yudhoyono
- Governor: Ahmad Heryawan
- Preceded by: Nu'man Abdul Hakim
- Succeeded by: Deddy Mizwar

Personal details
- Born: Dede Yusuf Macan Effendi; 14 September 1966 (age 59) Jakarta, Indonesia
- Party: Partai Amanat Nasional (2004–2013); Partai Demokrat (since 2013)
- Spouse: Ir. Sendy Ramania
- Children: 2
- Parents: Tammy Effendi (father); Rahayu Effendi (mother)
- Occupation: Politician, actor, director
- Awards: Lencana Karya Bhakti Pramuka; Lencana Melati (Pramuka)

Dede Yusuf Macan Effendi (born 14 September 1966) is an Indonesian actor known for his action films and sinetrons. He was also a member of Dewan Perwakilan Rakyat from Partai Amanat Nasional from 2004 to 2009 and he was the Vice Governor of West Java province from 2008 to 2013.

== Early life ==
Dede is the second child of Tammy Effendi and Rahayu Effendi. His father is a former Director of Ismail Marzuki Park Jakarta, while his mother was a dancer at Bogor Palace and a flight attendant for Garuda Indonesia who switched professions to become a film star in early 1965. His grandfather on his father's side, Roestam Effendi, originates from Koto Gadang, IV Koto Agam Regency, West Sumatra.

== Political career ==
Dede registered as a legislative candidate from PAN for the electoral district of West Java IX (Kuningan-Ciamis-Banjar). Dede was also elected as a Member of the Legislature for the 2004-2009 term and sat on Commission VII which deals with energy, the environment, petroleum and research.

Dede served as Vice Governor of West Java paired with Ahmad Heryawan in the 2008-2013 period, after winning the 2008 West Java Gubernatorial Election with 7,287,647 votes (40.5%). In 2012 he decided to continue his political career and ran for Governor of West Java for the 2013–2018 period paired with Lex Laksamana, former Regional Secretary of West Java. He decided to join the Democratic Party.

On March 3, 2013 the results of the West Java Gubernatorial Election were announced. Candidate pair number 3, Dede and Lex, ranked 3rd out of 5 pairs of candidates with 5,077,522 votes or 25.24 percent of the valid votes. In the 2014 legislative election, Dede ran as a legislative candidate for the DPR for the West Java II electoral district from the Democratic Party, he passed and was appointed as a member of the DPR for the 2014-2019 period with 142,939 votes.

== Personal life ==
Dede married Sendy Ramania Wurandani in early 1999 after dating for 7 years. They met when Dede was a Tae Kwon Do trainer at Tarakanita 1 High School. At that time, Sendy was a majorette from the Tarakanita drum music group. From this marriage, they were blessed with two children, Alifiya Arkana Paramita (2000) and Kaneishia Yusuf (2002).

== Awards and nominations ==
Year	Award	Category	Work	Result
1991	Indonesian Film Festival	Citra Award for Best Leading Actor	Perwira dan Ksatria	Nominated
