= Dere (singer) =

Indonesian singer-songwriter (born 2002)

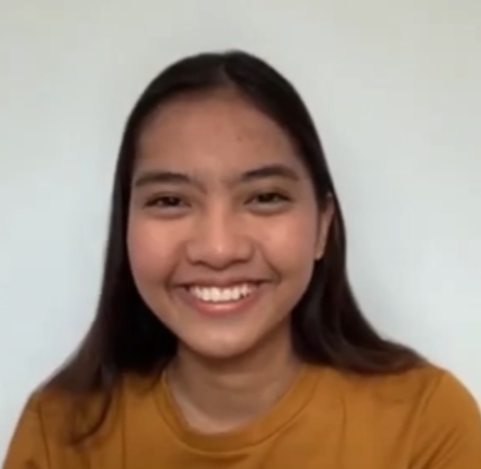
- In a 2022 interview
- Born: Theresia Margaretha Gultom; 1 June 2002 (age 23); Kupang, Indonesia
- Occupation: Singer-songwriter
- Years active: 2016–present
- Musical career
- Genres: Folk-pop
- Instruments: Vocals; guitar
- Labels: Tiga Dua Satu

Theresia Margaretha Gultom (born 1 June 2002), known professionally as Dere, is an Indonesian singer-songwriter. She released her debut studio album, Rubik in 2022. She was nominated for four Anugerah Musik Indonesia awards and won the Best Folk/Country/Ballad Production Work for "Berisik".

Dere is respected for her songwriting skills, unique voice, and meaningful lyrics. She actively collaborates with other artists and has contributed to multiple successful projects. She also performed at important national events like Indonesia's 77th Independence Day at the Istana Negara in Jakarta. As of 2024 and 2025, she continues to release new singles and prepare for her second album.

== Career ==
=== 2016–2019: The Voice Kids Indonesia and Aku Anak Indonesia ===
In 2016, Dere started her career by auditioning for the first season of The Voice Kids Indonesia. She auditioned singing Bridgit Mendler's "Hurricane" with Tulus and Bebi Romeo hitting their "I Want You" button. Dere ultimately chose Tulus to be her coach. She was eliminated in the Semi-finals round.

Round	Song	Original Artist	Date	Order	Result
Blind Audition	"Hurricane"	Bridgit Mendler	2 September 2016	2.5	Two chairs turned; joined Team Tulus
Battle Round	"Love Yourself" (vs. Bernadya Ribka and Antonius Kenny)	Justin Bieber	21 October 2016	9.2	Saved by Tulus
Live Top 24	"Don't Dream It's Over"	Crowded House	11 November 2016	12.12	Saved by Tulus
Live Top 12 (Semi-finals)	"Crash Your Party"	Karmin	25 November 2016	14.3	Eliminated

In June 2018, Dere along with ten The Voice Kids Indonesia finalists released a compilation album, Aku Anak Indonesia. They performed renditions of patriotic songs, which Dere sang "Tanah Airku", written by Saridjah Niung.

=== 2020–2023: Breakthrough and Rubik ===
In 2020, Dere signed a recording contract with record label owned by Tulus, Tiga Dua Satu and released her debut single "Kota". She co-wrote the song with Tulus and it was produced by Petra Sihombing. It gained popularity on TikTok. She received a nomination for Best New Artist at the Anugerah Musik Indonesia 2021 and won the Best Folk/Country/Ballad Production Work for "Berisik". She co-wrote two tracks "Remedi" and "Nala" of Tulus' fourth studio album Manusia in 2022.

In July 2022, Dere released her studio album Rubik. It received a nomination for Best Pop Album at the Anugerah Musik Indonesia 2023. In August 2022, Dere performed "Rayuan Pulau Kelapa", written by Ismail Marzuki, at the Istana Negara in Jakarta, during the 77th Indonesian Independence Day celebrations. Dere served as an opening act of Tulus' 2023 concert tour Tur Manusia in Batam, Samarinda, and Jakarta.

=== 2024–present: Berbunga ===
In November 2024, Dere released "Biru", marking her first single in two years. In February 2025, she released a single "Mawar". In July 2025, she released her second studio album, Berbunga.

== Discography ==
=== Studio albums ===
Title	Details
Rubik	Released: 21 July 2022; Label: Tiga Dua Satu; Format: CD, digital download, streaming
Berbunga	Released: 25 April 2025; Label: Tiga Dua Satu; Format: CD, digital download, streaming

=== Compilation albums ===
Title	Details
Aku Anak Indonesia	Released: 27 June 2018; Label: Universal Music Indonesia; Format: CD, digital download, streaming

=== Singles ===
Title	Year	Album
"Kota"	2020	Rubik
"Tanya"	2021	Rubik
"Berisik"	2021	Rubik
"Rumah"	2022	Rubik
"Biru"	2024	Berbunga
"Mawar"	2025	Berbunga
"Puspa"	2025	Berbunga

=== Songwriting credits ===
List of songs written or co-written by Dere for other artists, showing year released and album name
Title	Year	Artist(s)	Album
"Nala"	2022	Tulus	Manusia
"Remedi"	2022	Tulus	Manusia
