= Nissa Sabyan =

Indonesian singer

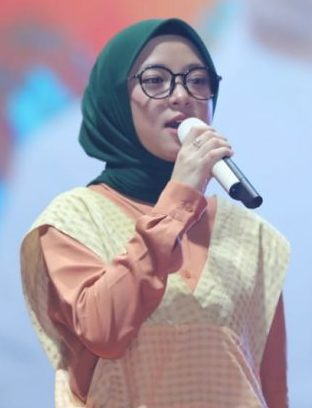
- Born: Khoirunnisa; 23 May 1999 (age 27); Lumajang, East Java, Indonesia
- Other name: Nissa Sabyan
- Occupation: Singer
- Musical career
- Genres: Islamic
- Instrument: Vocals
- Years active: 2017–present
- Labels: SMD Records; Inema Studio; VMC Music; Akurama Records; GP Records; Universal Music Indonesia
- Member of: Sabyan Gambus

Khoirunnisa (born 23 May 1999), known as Nissa Sabyan, is an Indonesian singer who is a member Sabyan Gambus as a vocalist. Nissa is known to public for often singing (cover) songs with Islamic nuances or prophet salawat. The video clip has been watched millions of times and is often trending on YouTube.

== Biography ==
=== Early life ===
Nissa Sabyan was born Khairunnisa on 23 May 1999 in Bandung, West Java, as the daughter of Komar Sabyan. She was raised there until 6th grade of primary school before moved to Jakarta. After graduating from junior high school, Nissa entered vocational high school.

From there, Nissa, who was just 19 years old in 2018, aspires to continue studying in the music major. But now Nissa wants to focus on her music group first.

=== Sabyan Gambus ===
Sabyan Gambus began to be known to public because it often brings Islamic songs or prophet's prayer, either by re-singing (cover) or singing new works. Sabyan Gambus consisting of several former Islamic boarding school students based in Jakarta.

Sabyan Gambus was made originally for weddings. The most popular collection of salawat songs is Nissa Sabyan, including Ya Maulana, Deen Assalam, Ya Jamalu, Law Kana Bainanal Habib, Ya Habibal Qolbi, Rahman ya Rahman, Ya Asyiqol Musthofa, Ahmad Ya Habibi, Ya Taiba, Qomarun, Assalamualaika ya Rasulullah, and others.

== Controversies ==
In February 2021, it was rumored that Nissa and Ayus, the keyboardist of Sabyan Gambus, had an affair. This issue shocked the public and was widely reported to Ririe Fairus, Ayus' wife. Ririe then went to the North Jakarta Religious Court. After keeping quiet from the media, on Sunday, February 21, 2021, Ayus made a 30-second video statement apologising to all parties for his mistake.

== Filmography ==
=== Film ===
Year	Title	Role	Production
2019	Sabyan: Menjemput Mimpi	Nissa	Millenia Pictures

== Awards ==
Year	Award	Category	Result
2018	Anugerah Syiar Ramadan 1439	Music band / singer	Won

== See also ==
- Sara Fajira
- Stephanie Poetri
