= Indonesian Idol Junior =

Televised singing competition

- Genre: Reality television
- Created by: Simon Fuller
- Presented by: Daniel Mananta; Arie Untung; Bastian Steel; Tarra Budiman; Alifa
- Starring: Arie Untung; Bastian Steel; Tarra Budiman; Alifa; Rayi Putra; Rizky Febian; Maia Estianty; Rossa; Daniel Mananta
- Judges: Rayi Putra; Rizky Febian; Maia Estianty; Rossa; Daniel Mananta; Regina Ivanova; Titi DJ; Irvanat; Vidi Aldiano; Nola AB Three
- Theme music composer: Julian Gingell; Cathy Dennis
- Composers: Julian Gingell; Cathy Dennis
- Country of origin: Indonesia
- Original language: Indonesian
- No. of seasons: 3
- No. of episodes: 44

Production
- Running time: 60-300 minutes
- Production companies: FremantleMedia Asia; 19 Entertainment

Original release
- Network: MNCTV (2014–2017); RCTI (2018–)
- Release: 4 October 2014 – 14 December 2018

Related
- Indonesian Idol; Indonesian Idol

Indonesian Idol Junior is a singing competition, same as the other Idol junior shows in other countries, such as Brazil, Germany, Puerto Rico and India. The show aired from 4 October 2014 until 14 December 2018.

== Presenter ==
=== Current ===
- Daniel Mananta

=== Former ===
- Arie Untung (season 1)
- Bastian Steel (season 1)
- Tarra Budiman (season 2)
- Alifa (season 2)

== Judges ==
=== Current ===
- Rayi Putra
- Rizky Febian
- Maia Estianty
- Rossa

=== Former ===
- Daniel Mananta (season 1–2)
- Regina Ivanova (season 1)
- Titi DJ (season 1)
- Irvanat (season 1)
- Vidi Aldiano (season 2)
- Nola AB Three (season 2)

== Result ==
=== Season 1 ===
Females	Males	Top 16	Top 14	Wild Card	Winner

Did Not Perform	Safe	Safe First	Safe Last	Eliminated	Judges' Save

Stage:		Top 16	Spectacular Shows												Finale
Week:		22/11	29/11	06/12	13/12	20/12	27/12	03/1	10/1	17/1	24/1	31/1	07/2	14/2	28/2
Place	Contestant	Result													
1	Johanes Tinambunan	Top 3	Top 3	Top 3	Top 3	Top 3	Top 3	Top 3		Top 2					Winner
2	Febrian Napitupulu		Top 3	Top 3		Bottom 2		Top 3			Top 2	Top 2			Runner-up
3	Vitara Harahap	Top 3			Top 3		Top 3		Top 3	Saved				Elim	
4	Abbygail Caroline		Bottom 3	Top 3	Top 3	Top 3			Bottom 2	Top 2	Top 2	Top 2	Elim		
5	Maria Simorangkir			Bottom 3			Top 3	Top 3	Top 3			Elim			
6	Baila Shaquanda	Top 3	Top 3			Top 3			Top 3		Elim				
7	Theresia Dian				Bottom 2			Bottom 2		Elim					
8	Christoper Laurensius	Wildcard		Bottom 3					Elim						
9	Andreas Tinambunan						Bottom 2	Elim							
10	Cyra Anindiya				Bottom 2		Elim								
11	Mutiara Naycilla	Wildcard				Elim									
12	Melitha Patricia			Elim											
13	Glen Thomas		Elim												
14	Fadly Zulfikar		Elim												
15-16	Morietnez Azra	Elim													
15-16	Vavel Indra Simanjuntak	Elim													

=== Season 2 ===
Females	Males	Top 14	Wild Card	Winner

Did Not Perform	Safe	Safe First	Safe Last	Eliminated	Judges' Save

Stage:		Spectacular Shows																Finale
Week:		13/11	20/11	27/11	4/12	11/12	18/12	25/12	1/1	8/1	15/1	22/1	29/1	5/2	12/2	19/2	26/2	11/3
Place	Contestant	Result																
1	Sharon Padidi		Top 3	Top 3	Top 4	Top 4	Top 4			Top 3	Top 3	Bottom 4						Winner
2	Adhitya Navis			Bottom 4	Bottom 4	Top 4	Top 4				Top 3	Bottom 4	Saved		Bottom 2	Bottom 2		Runner-up
3	Abdul Zubair		Top 3	Top 3	Top 4	Top 4	Bottom 4			Top 3	Bottom 5		Top 2				Elim	
4	Aura Amalia											Top 2		Bottom 2		Elim		
5	Helena Alycia											Top 2	Top 2		Elim			
6	Paundra Syauta			Bottom 4							Bottom 5			Elim				
7	Naora Anindya		Top 3		Top 4	Bottom 4	Bottom 4			Bottom 4	Top 3	Bottom 4	Elim					
8	Maxis Mordan		Bottom 4							Bottom 4	Bottom 5	Elim						
9	Nadya Natasia									Top 3	Elim							
10	Erditya Putra			Top 3	Top 4	Bottom 4	Top 4				Elim							
11	Akbar Herliansyah		Bottom 4	Bottom 4			Top 4			Elim								
12	Putri Resky		Bottom 4	Bottom 4	Bottom 4	Bottom 4	Bottom 4			Elim								
13	Brittaney Kimberly				Bottom 4	Top 4	Elim											
14	Samuel Cipta					Elim												
15	Nadhifa Azzahra				Elim													
16	Ivan Roy Simanjuntak		Elim															

=== Season 3 ===
Females	Males	Wild Card	Top 12	Winner

Did Not Perform	Safe	Safe First	Safe Last	Wild Card	Eliminated	Judges' Save

Stage:		Showcase		Spectacular Shows							Finale
Week:		12/10	19/10	26/10	2/11	9/11	16/11	23/11	30/11	7/12	14/7
Place	Contestant	Result									
1	Anneth Delliecia	Top 10		Top 3	Top 3	Top 3	Top 2	Top 2			Winner
2	Deven Christiandi		Top 10		Top 3		Bottom 3	Top 2		Bottom 2	Runner-up
3	Raisya Olfat	Top 10		Top 3		Top 3	Bottom 3	Bottom 2	Bottom 2		3rd place
4	Gemilang Abetnego	Top 10			Bottom 3					Elim	
5	Nashwa Zahira		Top 10	Top 3	Top 3	Top 3	Top 2		Elim		
6	Khaerunnisa Putri	Top 10		Bottom 3		Bottom 3		Elim			
7	Charisa Faith		Top 10			Bottom 3	Elim				
8	Mirai Naziel		Top 10		Bottom 3	Elim					
9	Joaquine Bernessa	Top 10		Bottom 3	Elim						
10	Lifia Laeticia		Top 10	Elim							
11-14	Britney Kimberly		Elim								
11-14	Friden Panggabean		Elim								
11-14	Marsha Ayuni	Elim									
11-14	Michael Audi	Elim									
