= Bernadya =

Indonesian singer-songwriter (born 2004)

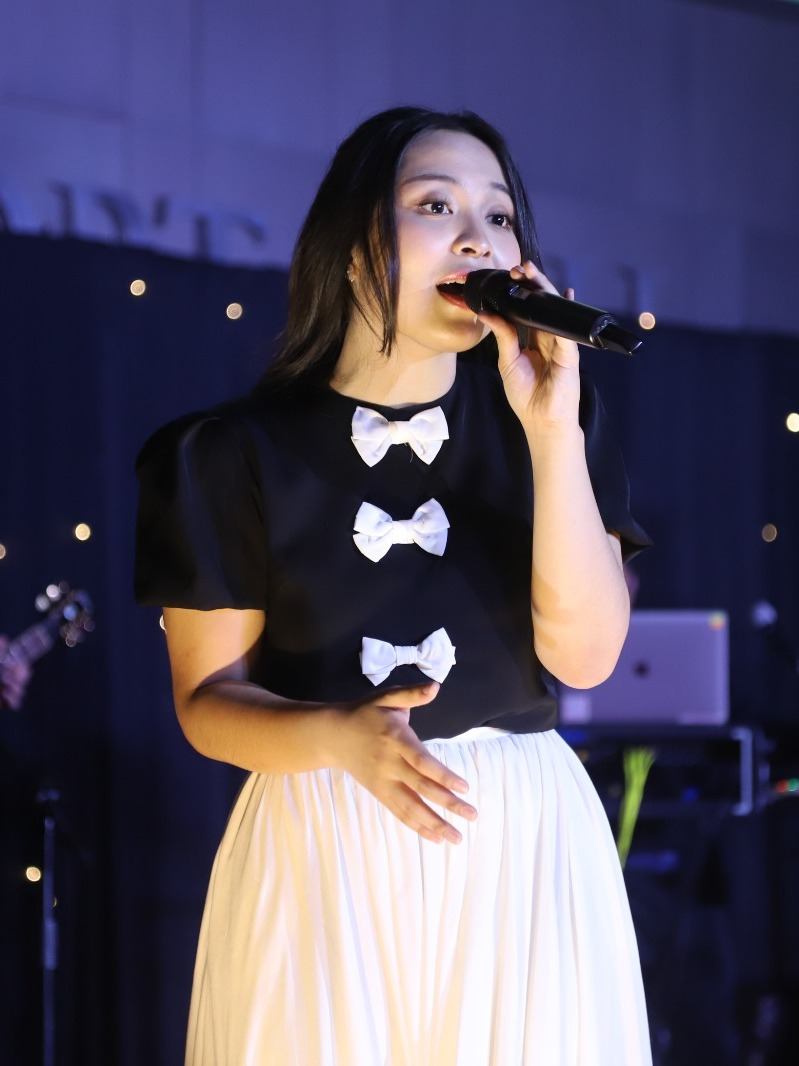
- Born: Bernadya Ribka Jayakusuma; 16 March 2004 (age 22); Surabaya, East Java, Indonesia
- Occupation: Singer-songwriter
- Years active: 2016–present
- Musical career
- Genre: Pop
- Instruments: Vocals; guitar; piano
- Label: Juni Records

Bernadya Ribka Jayakusuma (born 16 March 2004), better known mononymously as Bernadya, is an Indonesian singer-songwriter. She released her debut studio album, Sialnya, Hidup Harus Tetap Berjalan in 2024 to commercial and critical success. She won three Anugerah Musik Indonesia awards from six nominations, including Album of the Year.

== Career ==
=== 2016–2022: The Voice Kids Indonesia and Celine and Nadya ===
In 2016, Bernadya started her career by auditioning for the first season of The Voice Kids Indonesia. She auditioned singing Adele's "One and Only" with only Tulus turned his chair; thus, she was on Team Tulus by default. She was eliminated in the Battle Round, competed against Theresia "Dere" Gultom and Antonius Kenny. They performed Justin Bieber's "Love Yourself", then Tulus chose Gultom to move forward to the next round.

Round	Song	Original Artist	Date	Order	Result
Blind Audition	"One and Only"	Adele	14 October 2016	8.4	Only Tulus Turned, Joined Team Tulus by default
Battle Round	"Love Yourself" (vs. Theresia Gultom and Antonius Kenny)	Justin Bieber	21 October 2016	9.2	Eliminated

In 2018, Bernadya and her sister, Celine, formed a duo, Celine & Nadya and released their debut single titled "Lugu". In 2021, they released their debut studio album Love, Youth, You, Ch. 1. In 2022, Celine & Nadya released their last single "Sadar", before going on a hiatus due to Celine focusing on her studies.

=== 2022–2023: Terlintas ===
In June 2022, Bernadya signed a contract with record label Juni Records. In September 2022, she released her debut solo single "Apa Mungkin". On 21 February 2023, Bernadya served as the opening act for her The Voice Kids Indonesia coach, Tulus for his concert tour Tur Manusia date in Manado, North Sulawesi.

In March 2023, she released her second single "Masa Sepi". In April 2023, Bernadya was selected as one of the ten artists in Spotify Indonesia Radar to showcase new artists globally. She released her debut extended play titled Terlintas in June 2023, produced by Rendy Pandugo and Lafa Pratomo. One of the tracks, "Satu Bulan" became a sleeper hit and topped both the Indonesian ASIRI and Billboard charts in September 2024. At the Anugerah Musik Indonesia 2023, Bernadya received a nomination for Best New Artist.

=== 2024: Sialnya, Hidup Harus Tetap Berjalan ===
In November 2023, Adryanto Pratono, founder of Juni Records, announced that Bernadya was working on her debut album. In February 2024, Bernadya released the lead single of her then-upcoming debut studio album, "Kata Mereka Ini Berlebihan", about a one-sided devotion to her partner and produced by Petra Sihombing. The single was followed by "Kini Mereka Tahu", released in May 2024.

Bernadya released her debut studio album Sialnya, Hidup Harus Tetap Berjalan on 24 June 2024. It is a concept album that follows three phases of going through a breakup, Heartbreak, Self Doubt, and Realization. She then embarked on a concert tour, Tur Berjalan, in four cities around Java. On 12 August 2024, she broke two Spotify records: the most-streamed artist in Indonesia in a day, and Sialnya, Hidup Harus Tetap Berjalan as the most-streamed album in Indonesia in a day. In October 2024, Bernadya received five nominations at the Anugerah Musik Indonesia 2024 for Production Work of the Year, Best Female Pop Solo Performance, and Best Pop Songwriter for "Untungnya, Hidup Harus Tetap Berjalan", also Album of the Year and Best Pop Album for Sialnya, Hidup Harus Tetap Berjalan.

== Artistry ==
=== Influences ===
Bernadya cites Taylor Swift, Niki, Tulus, and Raisa as her influence in creating music. She explained that Tulus had a distinctive approach in writing lyrics, meanwhile she grew up listening to Raisa's music. In an Apple Music playlist, she added Lizzy McAlpine, Olivia Rodrigo, Day6, Bruno Major, Paramore, Phoebe Bridgers, Bilal Indrajaya, The Bird and the Bee, Laufey, and John Mayer as the artists who had influenced her in music.

=== Music ===
Bernadya has been known for releasing melancholic and heartbreak-themed tracks. She often uses "modest" lyrics and everyday language in her songs. In his four-and-a-half star review of Sialnya, Hidup Harus Tetap Berjalan, Anto Arief of Pophariini described her storytelling ability as one of the strongest parts of the album. He further mentioned that Bernadya's strength among her peers was her ability to connect through her lyrics. He described Sialnya, Hidup Harus Tetap Berjalan as a "guide book for understanding the thoughts and feelings of a woman towards her partner." (Note: Original: "...buku peta petunjuk jalan untuk memahami pemikiran dan perasaan seorang perempuan terhadap pasangannya".)

== Discography ==
=== Studio albums ===
Title	Details
Sialnya, Hidup Harus Tetap Berjalan	Released: 23 June 2024; Label: Juni; Format: CD, digital download, streaming
Semoga Hanya di Mimpi	Released: 24 June 2026; Label: Juni; Format: Digital download, streaming

=== Extended plays ===
Title	Details
Terlintas	Released: 22 June 2023; Label: Juni; Format: Digital download, streaming, box set

=== Singles ===
Title	Year	Peak chart positions		Album
Title	Year	IDN	IDN Songs	Album
"Apa Mungkin"	2022	7	8	Terlintas
"Masa Sepi"	2023	33	—	Terlintas
"Kata Mereka Ini Berlebihan"	2024	5	5	Sialnya, Hidup Harus Tetap Berjalan
"Kini Mereka Tahu"	2024	9	9	Sialnya, Hidup Harus Tetap Berjalan
"Percik Kecil" (with JKT48)	2025	—	—	Non-album single
"Kita Buat Menyenangkan"	2026	—	—	Semoga Hanya di Mimpi
"Rabun Jauh"	2026	—	—	Semoga Hanya di Mimpi
"—" denotes a recording that did not chart or was not released in that territory.

=== Other charted songs ===
Title	Year	Peak chart positions			Album
Title	Year	IDN	IDN Songs	MYS Songs	Album
"Satu Bulan"	2023	1	1	—	Terlintas
"Lama-Lama"	2024	7	7	—	Sialnya, Hidup Harus Tetap Berjalan
"Untungnya, Hidup Harus Tetap Berjalan"	2024	3	3	4	Sialnya, Hidup Harus Tetap Berjalan
"Sialnya, Hidup Harus Tetap Berjalan"	2024	17	16	—	Sialnya, Hidup Harus Tetap Berjalan
"—" denotes a recording that did not chart or was not released in that territory.

=== Guest appearances ===
List of non-single guest appearances, with other performing artists, showing year released and album name
Title	Year	Other artist	Album
"Asumsi"	2024	Adrian Khalif	Harap-Harap Emas

=== With Celine and Nadya ===
==== Studio albums ====
Title	Details
Love, Youth, You, Ch. 1	Released: 16 July 2021; Label: Independent; Format: Digital download, streaming

==== Singles ====
Title	Year	Album
"Lugu"	2018	Love, Youth, You, Ch. 1
"Kau Lagi"	2020	Love, Youth, You, Ch. 1
"Apa Dia Tau?"	2021	Love, Youth, You, Ch. 1
"Sisakan Satu Untukku"	2021	Love, Youth, You, Ch. 1
"Sadar"	2022	Non-album single

== Tours ==
Headlining

- Tur Berjalan (2024)

As opening act

- Tulus – Tur Manusia (2023)

== Accolades ==
Award	Year (Note: Indicates the year of ceremony. Each year is linked to the article about the awards held that year, wherever possible.)	Category	Recipient	Result	Ref.
Anugerah Musik Indonesia	2023	Best New Artist	Herself for "Apa Mungkin"	Nominated	
Anugerah Musik Indonesia	2024	Album of the Year	Sialnya, Hidup Harus Tetap Berjalan	Won	
Anugerah Musik Indonesia	2024	Production Work of the Year	"Untungnya, Hidup Harus Tetap Berjalan"	Nominated	
Anugerah Musik Indonesia	2024	Best Pop Album	Sialnya, Hidup Harus Tetap Berjalan	Won	
Anugerah Musik Indonesia	2024	Best Female Pop Solo Artist	"Untungnya, Hidup Harus Tetap Berjalan"	Nominated	
Anugerah Musik Indonesia	2024	Best Pop Songwriter	Herself and Petra Sihombing for "Untungnya, Hidup Tetap Berjalan"	Won	
Music Awards Japan	2025	Best Song Asia	Herself for "Satu Bulan"	Nominated	
