= Barasuara =

Indonesian indie rock band

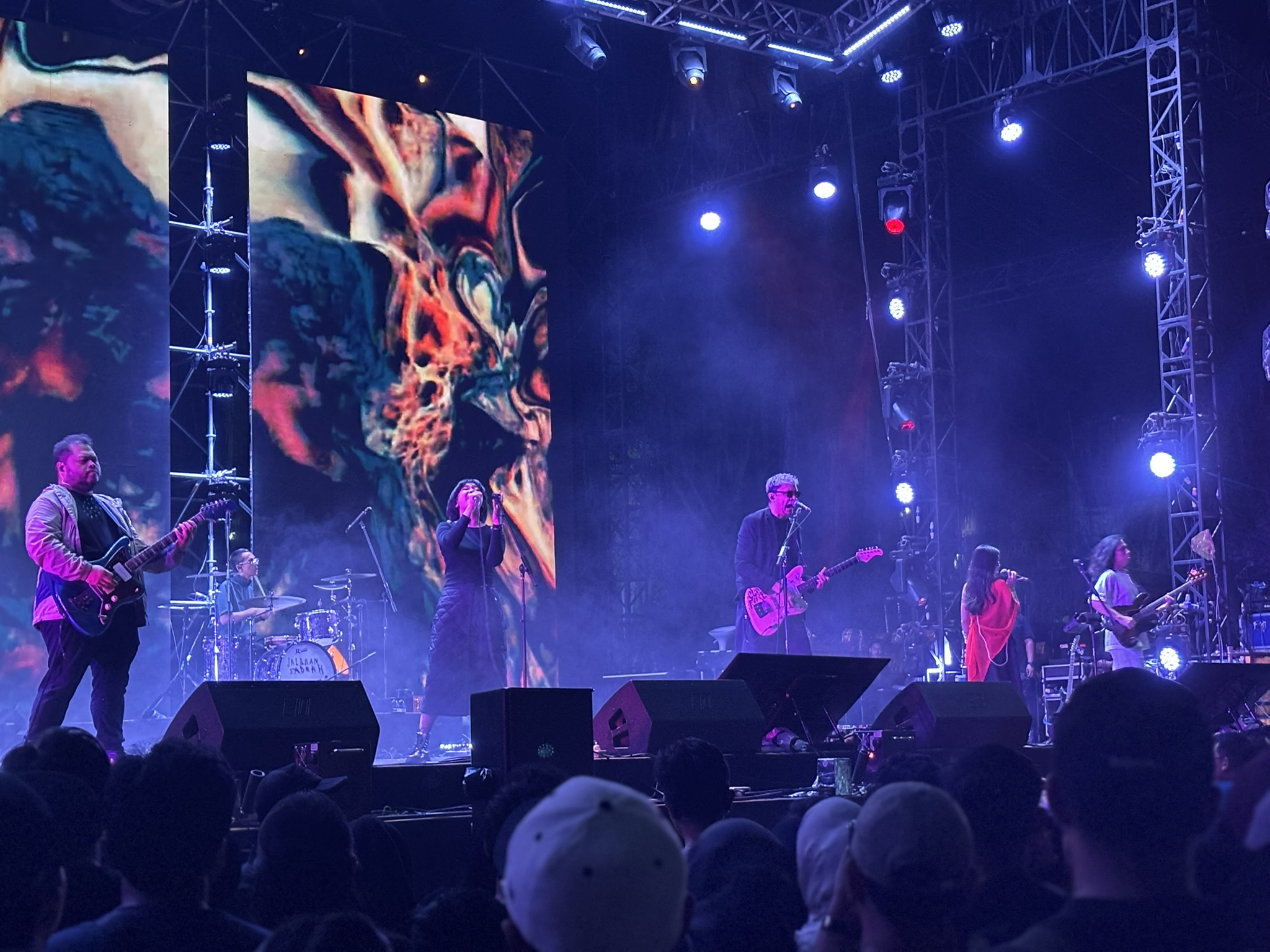
- Barasuara at Synchronize Fest, Jakarta, October 2025

Background information
- Origin: Jakarta, Indonesia
- Genre: Alternative rock
- Years active: 2012–present
- Labels: Hu Shah; Darlin; Juni
- Members: Iga Massardi; Puti Chitara; Asteriska; TJ Kusuma; Gerald Situmorang; Marco Steffiano
- Past members: Pandu Fathoni

Barasuara is an Indonesian alternative rock band formed in 2012, consisting of vocalist/guitarist Iga Massardi, vocalists Puti Chitara and Asteriska, guitarist TJ Kusuma, bassist Gerald Situmorang, and drummer Marco Steffiano.

== History ==
Iga Massardi, who was previously active in various bands such as Tika and The Dissidents and Trees & Wild, initially intended to start his solo project. However, he eventually was interested to work his material in a band and invited TJ Kusuma, Marco Steffiano, and Asteriska to join him. Bassist Pandu Fathoni initially joined the lineup but was replaced by Gerald Situmorang due to his busy schedule. Barasuara made their debut live performance at Massardi's café TokoVe in South Jakarta on 8 June 2014 as a quintet. Puti Chitara joined the band shortly after.

Barasuara's debut studio album, Taifun was released on 16 October 2015, with singles "Bahas Bahasa" and "Sendu Melagu". In May 2016, the band embarked on their first concert tour, Taifun Tour, across Java. In 2016, the band was nominated for two AMI Awards, winning the award for Best Alternative Production Work for "Bahas Bahasa". Taifun was nominated for Album of the Year at the 3rd Indonesian Choice Awards. Barasuara was also honored as the Best Live Act at the 2016 Rolling Stone Indonesia Editors Choice Awards.

In 2018, Barasuara signed a contract with record label Darlin Records. On 21 September 2018, they released "Guna Manusia" as the lead single from their sophomore studio album. Their sophomore album Pikiran dan Perjalanan was released on 8 March 2019. On 29 September 2019, Barasuara served as the opening act on the Jakarta date of The 1975's Music for Cars concert tour. On 6 December 2019, they released a remix extended play titled PQ-Race dan Perjalanan, featuring rendition of the album's title track by each member. In 2020, they released a single "Bangkit dan Berlari" as a campaign with Indosat Ooredoo.

Barasuara released "Fatalis" as the lead single from their upcoming third studio album on 27 July 2022. The track won the Best Rock Duo/Group/Collaboration at the 2023 AMI Awards. On 15 February 2023, they released "Merayakan Fana" as the second single, featuring orchestral arrangement by Erwin Gutawa and Czech Symphony Orchestra. On August 8, 2023, they released "Terbuang Dalam Waktu", described by them as their "most pop and sweetest track". They released their third studio album, Jalaran Sadrah on 21 June 2024.

== Members ==
Current members

- Iga Massardi – vocals, guitar
- Puti Chitara – vocals, occasionally also guitar, keyboard or synthesizer
- Asteriska – vocals
- TJ Kusuma – guitar
- Gerald Situmorang – bass guitar
- Marco Steffiano – drums

Former members

- Pandu Fathoni – bass guitar

== Discography ==
=== Studio albums ===
- Taifun (2015)
- Pikiran dan Perjalanan (2019)
- Jalaran Sadrah (2024)

=== Remix albums ===
- PQ-Race dan Perjalanan (2019)

=== Singles ===
List of singles, showing year released and album name
Title	Year	Album
"Bahas Bahasa"	2015	Taifun
"Sendu Melagu"	2015	Taifun
"Guna Manusia"	2018	Pikiran dan Perjalanan
"Pikiran dan Perjalanan"	2019	Pikiran dan Perjalanan
"Bangkit dan Berlari"	2020	Non-album single
"Fatalis"	2022	Jalaran Sadrah
"Merayakan Fana"	2023	Jalaran Sadrah
"Terbuang dalam Waktu"	2023	Jalaran Sadrah
