= Christopher Edgar =

Indonesian singer

Christo Edgar
- Born: Christopher Edgar Napitupulu; December 22, 2002 (age 23); Bandung, Indonesia
- Genres: Pop; R&B; reggae; hip-hop
- Occupation: Singer
- Instrument: Vocal, piano
- Years active: 2011—present
- Label: Universal Music Indonesia

Christopher Edgar Napitupulu (born December 22, 2002) is an Indonesian singer who won The Voice Kids Indonesia of season 1, where he join and mentored by Tulus, and signed with Universal Music Indonesia.

== Life and career ==
Christopher Edgar Napitulu was born on December 22, 2002, in Bandung, West Java to parents Henry Yo Napit and Julia De. He also perform in a musical drama theater which produced by Mira Lesmana in, titled Laskar Pelangi where his role as Lintang.

Before auditioned to the competition singer, he was joined a children's talent program which under by Erwin Gutawa and Gita Gutawa, Di Atas Rata-Rata of first generation, for developing his singing talent.

=== The Voice Kids Indonesia ===
On October 14, 2016, he became a contestant on season 1 of The Voice Kids Indonesia and sang "Grenade" for his blind audition performance. Two coaches, Tulus, and Agnez Mo turned their chairs for him and he chose Tulus as his coach. In the battle rounds, Christo was up against Michelle Celine and Rahadila Putri with the song "Treasure (Bruno Mars song)" by Bruno Mars. Christo went on to sing through the live shows, where he performed his finale song "Fix You" by Coldplay. On December 2, 2016, Christo was crowned the first season winner of The Voice Kids Indonesia. He became the first winner of this singing talent show.

Performances

The Voice Kids Indonesia season 1 performances and results
Stage	Song	Original artist	Date	Order	Result
Blind Audition	"Grenade"	Bruno Mars	October 14, 2016	8.8	two chairs turned, join team Tulus
Battle Rounds (Top 72)	"Treasure" (vs. Michelle Celine vs. Rahadila Putri )	Bruno Mars	November 4, 2016	11.8	Saved by Coach
Live Show (Top 24)	"Angel"	Sarah McLachlan	November 11, 2016	12.4	Saved by Public Vote
Live Semifinals (Top 12)	"Set Fire to the Rain"	Adele	November 25, 2016	14.1	Saved by Coach
Live Finals (Top 6)	"Writing's on the Wall"	Sam Smith	December 2, 2016	15.5	Save by Public Vote
Live Finals (Top 3)	"Fix You"	Coldplay	December 2, 2016	15.9	Winner

Non competition performances
Order	Collaborator(s)	Song	Original Artist
12.1	All Finalists	"Di Atas Awan"	Nidji
14.1	All Finalists	"Best Song Ever"	One Direction
15.2	Tulus and Dru Nuca	"Please Don't Talk About Me When I'm Gone"	Bee Palmer
15.5	Elha Nympha and All Finalists	"I'm in Love with a Monster"	Fifth Harmony

Awards and achievements
Preceded by N/A	The Voice Kids Indonesia; Winner; 2016	Succeeded by Sharla Martiza
