= Conchita Caroline =

Indonesian actress and TV presenter

- Born: Conchita Caroline Chairunnisa; 21 August 1995 (age 30); Jakarta, Indonesia
- Occupation: Presenter
- Years active: 2007-Present

Conchita Caroline Chairunnisa (born in Jakarta, 21 August 1995) is an Indonesian actress and TV presenter. Conchita also works as a Sportscaster. She hosts Lensa Olahraga on ANTV.

== Filmography ==
=== Film ===
- Oh Baby (2008)

=== Sinetron ===
- Suci
- Dia Bukan Cinderella
- Cinta Intan
- Kasih dan Amara
- Amira
- Hafizah
- Sinar
- Sepakat Untuk Tidak Sepakat
- Tikus Kucing Mencari Cinta Lagi

== FTV ==
- Balada Cinta Keroncong Batak (2012) as Cindy
- Lucky 17 (2012)
- Cintaku Nenek Ompong (2012)

== Music videos ==
- Sandiwara Cinta by Repvblik (2012)

== Hosting ==
- Lensa Olahraga Pagi - ANTV
- Kiss - Indosiar
- ISL - ANTV
- Insert Pagi - Trans TV
- Selebrita - Trans 7
- Kampiun - ANTV
- Sport Zone - RTV
- Serie A - Kompas TV
- Katakan Putus - Trans TV
- Piala Presiden 2015 - Indosiar
- Sapa Indonesia Akhir Pekan - Kompas TV
- Cakep Show - TVRI
- Soccer Magz - inews TV
- Newslog - Metro TV
- Football Inside - Kompas TV
- Copa América Centenario - Kompas TV
- UEFA Europa League - SCTV
- UEFA Champions League - SCTV
- The Next Boy/Girl Band Indonesia - Global TV
- Premier League - MNCTV

== Commercials ==
- Cap Lang
