= List of chamber pop albums =

The following is a list of chamber pop albums in release order. It may include EPs and non-studio albums.

Title	Artist	Release date	Ref.
The Beach Boys Today!	the Beach Boys	8 March 1965	
Pet Sounds	the Beach Boys	16 May 1966	
Odessey and Oracle	the Zombies	19 April 1968	
Paris 1919	John Cale	25 February 1973	
Skylarking	XTC	27 October 1986	
Out of Time	R.E.M.	12 March 1991	
Automatic for the People	R.E.M.	5 October 1992	
Tindersticks	Tindersticks	11 October 1993	
Promenade	the Divine Comedy	28 March 1994	
Cardinal	Cardinal	November 1994	
Hawaii	the High Llamas	25 March 1996	
Tidal	Fiona Apple	23 July 1996	
If You're Feeling Sinister	Belle and Sebastian	18 November 1996	
Fin de Siècle	the Divine Comedy	31 August 1998	
Deserter's Songs	Mercury Rev	29 September 1998	
Apple Venus Volume 1	XTC	2 March 1999	
Nixon	Lambchop	7 February 2000	
Fevers and Mirrors	Bright Eyes	29 May 2000	
Somnambulista	Brazzaville	2001	
Lil' Beethoven	Sparks	26 November 2002	
Absent Friends	the Divine Comedy	29 March 2004	
Funeral	Arcade Fire	14 September 2004	
I Am a Bird Now	Antony and the Johnsons	1 February 2005	
Illinois	Sufjan Stevens	5 July 2005	
Centralismo	Sore	15 July 2005	
Jollity	Pugwash	23 September 2005	
23	Blonde Redhead	10 April 2007	
Vampire Weekend	Vampire Weekend	29 January 2008	
The Singer	Teitur Lassen	February 2008	
Eleven Modern Antiquities	Pugwash	21 March 2008	
Ports of Lima	Sore	24 April 2008	
Veckatimest	Grizzly Bear	26 May 2009	
All We Grow	S. Carey	24 August 2010	
Bon Iver, Bon Iver	Bon Iver	17 June 2011	
The Olympus Sound	Pugwash	19 August 2011	
50 Words for Snow	Kate Bush	21 November 2011	
Lush	Mitski	31 January 2012	
~	iamthemorning	27 April 2012	
Modern Vampires of the City	Vampire Weekend	14 May 2013	
Miscellany	iamthemorning	1 January 2014	
Range of Light	S. Carey	1 April 2014	
Belighted	iamthemorning	15 September 2014	
Natalie Prass	Natalie Prass	27 January 2015	
So There	Ben Folds	11 September 2015	
Have You in My Wilderness	Julia Holter	25 September 2015	
From the House of Arts	iamthemorning	23 October 2015	
Your Hands	Bahngbek	28 December 2015	
Commontime	Field Music	5 February 2016	
Grasque	Choir of Young Believers	19 February 2016	
Lighthouse	iamthemorning	1 April 2016	
Hippopotamus	Sparks	8 September 2017	
Open Here	Field Music	2 February 2018	
Titanic Rising	Weyes Blood	5 April 2019	
The Weight of the Sun	Modern Studies	8 May 2020	
Folklore	Taylor Swift	24 July 2020	
Evermore	Taylor Swift	11 December 2020	
OK Human	Weezer	29 January 2021	
Ocean to Ocean	Tori Amos	29 October 2021	
Madison	Sloppy Jane	5 November 2021	
Ants From Up There	Black Country, New Road	4 February 2022	
Once Twice Melody	Beach House	18 February 2022	
Ugly Season	Perfume Genius	17 June 2022	
Long Is the Tunnel	Dashevskaya	10 November 2023	
The Tortured Poets Department	Taylor Swift	19 April 2024	
Lives Outgrown	Beth Gibbons	17 May 2024	
Racing Mount Pleasant	Racing Mount Pleasant	15 August 2025	
