= Mondo Gascaro =

Indonesian musical artist

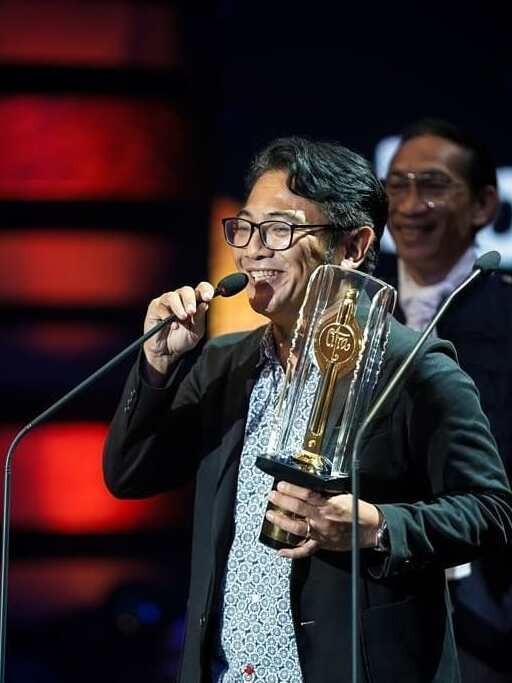
- Mondo Gascaro in 2019
- Born: Ramondo Gascaro; August 22, 1975 (age 50); Jakarta, Indonesia
- Occupations: Musician, arranger, songwriter, singer, music producer
- Spouse: Sarah Glandosch (2013–)
- Parent: Tilly Haryoto
- Musical career
- Genres: jazz, pop
- Instruments: Keyboard, guitar
- Years active: 2004–
- Labels: Aksara Records; Ivy League Music
- Website: https://mondogascaromusic.com/

Ramondo Gascaro (better known as Mondo Gascaro, born 22 August 1975) is an Indonesian musician, singer-songwriter, music director, and record producer.

Gascaro first gained widespread recognition as one of the founding members of the music group Sore. After leaving the group, he continued his career as a solo artist. He is also known as a music director and soundtrack producer for various Indonesian films.

== Early life ==
Ramondo Gascaro was born in Jakarta on 22 August 1975, to a mixed Japanese-Indonesian family and grew up in Cikini, Central Jakarta. His parents owned a Japanese karaoke bar, with one of its branches located in Blok M, which later became the origin of the Little Tokyo area. Some of his childhood experiences included watching wayang kulit (traditional shadow puppet) performances in the Senen area of Central Jakarta with his grandfather, as well as listening to his grandmother play the piano. After finishing school, he continued his studies in Los Angeles, majoring in music theory.

== Career ==
In 2001, Mondo Gascaro, along with Ade Paloh and Awan Garnida, founded the music group Sore. The group released its first song, titled Cermin, on the compilation album JKT:SKRG under the Aksara Records label in 2004. A year later, Sore released its debut album, Centralismo. The album was included in Time Asia magazine's list of "Five Asian Albums Worth Buying" and ranked 40th on Rolling Stone Indonesia’s list of the "150 Best Indonesian Albums". In 2008, the group released its second album, Ports of Lima. Like its predecessor, the album received positive responses; Rolling Stone Indonesia named it the best album of 2008.

After leaving the band Sore in 2012, Gascaro founded a record label called Ivy League Music together with his wife, Sarah Glandosch. In 2014, Gascaro released his first two singles, titled Saturday Light and Komorebi, in 2014. The singles were released both on digital platforms and in a limited physical format. The releases were received well by critics.

In 2016, Gascaro released Rajakelana, his debut solo album. The album was released both in Indonesia and in Japan, and received positive responses from various media platforms. Tempo magazine and the news website Medcom.id selected it as the best album of 2016.

In 2018, Gascaro released a single titled April. He also wrote a song called Lebuh Rasa, which was one of several tracks featured in the film Aruna & Her Palate. Two years later, the song was released as a single alongside the film's debut on the streaming platform Netflix. At the end of 2018, he served as music director, composer, and musician for the soundtrack album of Memories of My Body. For the album, Gascaro wrote a new song titled Dari Seberang and created a cover of Apatis by Benny Soebardja. The album earned him the award for Best Original Score at the 2019 Indonesian Film Festival (Festival Film Indonesia). That same year, he also collaborated with veteran jazz singer Rien Djamain on a single titled Dian Asmara.

== Music ==
Gascaro stated that he prioritizes musical exploration and aims to create atmosphere in each of his song arrangements. Some of the musicians who have influenced him include The Beatles, Antonio Carlos Jobim, Frank Zappa, Ismail Marzuki, and Steely Dan. The Jakarta Post wrote in a review that Gascaro's music is rooted in tradition, particularly in Indonesian retro-pop. Film director Garin Nugroho remarked that Gascaro embodies elements of Indonesia's past and present memories, and that he "emphasizes simplicity and the ability to manage emotion through his choices."

== Discography ==
=== Album ===
With Sore

- Centralismo (2005)
- Ports of Lima (2008)
- Sombreros Kiddos (2010)

Solo albums

- Saturday Light // Komorebi (2014)
- Rajakelana (2016)

Live albums

- Together Whatever Sessions (2018)

=== Single ===
- "Saturday Light" (2014)
- "A Deacon's Summer" (2016)
- "April" (2018)
- "Dian Asmara" (with Rien Djamain, 2019)
- "Lebuh Rasa" (2020)
- "Dan Bila" (with Pablo Cikaso, 2020)
- "Kucinta Indonesia" (with Mian Tiara, 2020)

== Filmography ==
=== Film ===
Key
| † | Denotes films that have not yet been released |

| Year | Title | Credited as | Notes |
| Year | Title | Composer | Notes |
|---|---|---|---|
| 2006 | Berbagi Suami | Yes | |
| 2007 | Quickie Express | Yes | |
| 2007 | Perempuan Punya Cerita | Yes | |
| 2008 | Takut: Faces of Fear | Yes | |
| 2009 | Pintu Terlarang | Yes | |
| 2009 | Preman in Love | Yes | |
| 2009 | Meraih Mimpi | Yes | |
| 2010 | Roman Picisan | Yes | |
| 2010 | Madame X | Yes | |
| 2011 | Milli &amp; Nathan | Yes | |
| 2011 | 5 Elang | Yes | |
| 2011 | Arisan! 2 | Yes | |
| 2011 | Garuda di Dadaku 2 | Yes | |
| 2012 | Negeri 5 Menara | Yes | |
| 2012 | Modus Anomali | Yes | |
| 2012 | Hello Goodbye | Yes | |
| 2012 | Potong Bebek Angsa | Yes | |
| 2016 | Spy in Love | Yes | |
| 2019 | Kucumbu Tubuh Indahku | Yes | |
| 2020 | Generasi 90an: Melankolia | Yes | |
| 2024 | Monster | Yes | |
| 2025 | Rahasia Rasa † | Yes | |

== Awards and nominations ==
| Year | Award | Category | Work | Result |
|---|---|---|---|---|
| 2012 | Piala Maya 2012 | Best Theme Song | "Oh Jakarta" – Arisan! 2 | Nominated |
| 2017 | Anugerah Musik Indonesia 2017 | Best Alternative Production | "A Deacon's Summer" | Nominated |
| 2017 | Indonesian Choice Awards 2017 | Male Singer of the Year | – | Nominated |
| 2019 | Anugerah Musik Indonesia 2019 | Best Original Soundtrack Production | "Apatis" | Nominated |
| 2019 | Piala Maya 2019 | Best Arranger | Kucumbu Tubuh Indahku | Nominated |
| 2019 | Festival Film Bandung 2019 | Outstanding Music Arranger for a Movie | Kucumbu Tubuh Indahku | Nominated |
| 2019 | Festival Film Indonesia 2019 | Best Music Arranger | Kucumbu Tubuh Indahku | Won |
| 2020 | Anugerah Musik Indonesia 2020 | Best Contemporary Jazz Artist | "Dian Asmara" (bersama Rien Djamain) | Nominated |
| 2020 | Anugerah Musik Indonesia 2020 | Best Alternative Solo Artist | "Lebuh Rasa (OST. Aruna & Lidahnya)" | Nominated |
