= Marjana Semkina =

Russian musician

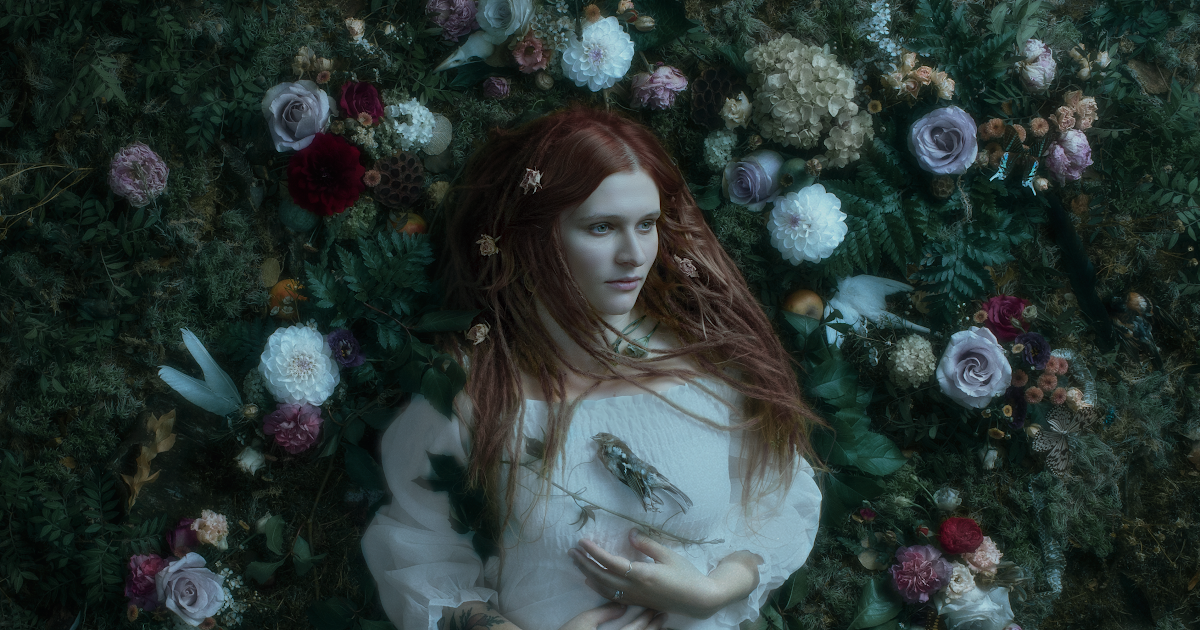
- Semkina on Sleepwalking

Background information
- Born: Марьяна Сёмкина; Baikonur Cosmodrome, Kazakhstan
- Genres: Progressive rock; chamber pop; acoustic rock
- Occupations: Musician; singer; songwriter
- Instruments: vocals; guitar
- Years active: 2008–present
- Labels: Kscope, Unsigned artist
- Member of: Iamthemorning; Maer
- Website: marjanasemkina.com

Marjana Semkina (pronunciation: má-ree-á-na sem-kee-na) (also: Mariana Semkina; Russian: Марьяна Сёмкина) is a Russian-born singer and songwriter, based in the United Kingdom since 2020. She has released music as a solo artist, and as a member and co-founder of the bands iamthemorning and Maer.

== Biography ==
Semkina was born in the Baikonur Cosmodrome, where her father worked as part of the spaceport team, before moving to the Russian city of Kazan and then Moscow.

In 2007 she moved to St. Petersburg, where she started the first of several music projects.

In 2016, Semkina conceived the idea of selling handmade paper birds featuring autographs, hand-written lyrics, and artwork, by Semkina and musician friends including Arnór Dan of Agent Fresco, Einar Solberg of Leprous, Xen of Ne Obliviscaris, and Nick Beggs, with all proceeds going to charitable causes. To date these causes have included orphanages, pet shelters, horse rescue, and medical equipment for nurses during the COVID-19 pandemic.

In 2018, Semkina was awarded an Exceptional Talent visa from the United Kingdom following an endorsement from Arts Council England, an award that would lead to her move to the UK in 2020.

In 2019, Semkina appeared on an all-female panel discussion on the changing role women have to play in the traditionally male-dominated genre of progressive music.

Semkina has been an outspoken critic of the Russian government and the 2022 invasion of Ukraine, and has raised funds for the treatment of Ukrainian children harmed in the war. She took part in the anti-war protests in London in 2022 and was featured in UK media in connection with the protests.

== Music career ==
=== Iamthemorning ===
In 2010 Semkina met pianist and composer Gleb Kolyadin, and the pair formed the progressive rock band Iamthemorning, with Semkina as co-writer, lyricist, and lead vocalist. Semkina also acts as the band's manager and art director.

After gathering a fan-base through their live performances in Russia, Iamthemorning self-released their debut album, ~, in 2012, and a follow-up EP, Miscellany, in 2014.

In 2014 they were signed by independent record label Kscope, and through that label released Belighted (2014), Lighthouse (2016), the live Blu-ray movie Ocean Sounds (2018), and The Bell (2019). During this time the band toured extensively throughout Europe, both as headliners and as support to bands including Riverside, Árstíðir, Gazpacho, and The Flower Kings, and made several appearances at progressive rock festivals.

While signed to Kscope, Iamthemorning continued to self-release albums, including the live album From the House of Arts (2015), and the EP Counting the Ghosts (2020).

=== Maer ===
A meeting with Anna Murphy (Cellar Darling) in 2019 led to them forming the duo Maer in 2022, with a debut single and music video released in October 2022.

=== Solo projects ===
In February 2020, Semkina's first solo album, Sleepwalking, was released by Kscope. All songs were written and sung by Semkina, with guest musicians including Nick Beggs, Craig Blundell, and Jordan Rudess. In support of her solo album, Semkina performed a series of acoustic concerts with guitarist Charlie Cawood, including support appearances with Daniel Cavanagh (Anathema) and Steve Rothery (Marillion).

In 2021, she released an EP titled Disillusioned.

In 2024, she released a second full-length album, titled Sirin, after the creature in Russian mythology.

=== Guest appearances ===
Semkina has appeared as a guest vocalist with diverse international bands including I Am Waiting For You Last Summer, Celestial Teapot, Echoes and Signals, Subsignal, Jordan Rudess, Charlie Cawood, Blackbriar, and Versa. She has appeared on stage as a guest vocalist with Daniel Cavanagh, Jordan Rudess, Árstíðir, and The Flower Kings.

== Music style and influences ==
Semkina's musical style has been broadly labelled progressive rock, and covered in genre magazines such as the UK's Prog, who described the music as “baroque pop prog with a very downbeat lyrical slant on life” and “quirky chamber pop”. Her music, both with Iamthemorning and with her solo projects, has been characterised by classical acoustic instrumentation (such as violin, cello, piano, and harp) and ambient electronics supplementing, or even replacing, traditional rock instrumentation.

Her voice and songwriting has been compared to Kate Bush, Tori Amos, and Portishead though Semkina herself denies that these were direct influences on her music. A common characteristic of Semkina's recorded songs is multi-tracking her voice to produce vocal harmonies and choruses.

Semkina writes and sings in English, but has also recorded songs in Latin, Icelandic, Russian, and Hungarian. Her lyrics cover a range of dark subject matter, and draw influence from sources such as Virginia Wolf, Sylvia Plath, Pre-Raphaelite art, and Victorian social history. Semkina says "We write songs about death, suffering and pain."

== Awards and recognition ==
The Iamthemorning album Lighthouse won in the Best Album category at the 2016 Progressive Music Awards.

In Prog Magazine's annual Readers’ Poll, Semkina was voted Female Vocalist of the Year three times, in 2016, 2019, and 2020, and voted Woman of the Year in 2016.

== Discography ==
=== Solo work ===
- Sleepwalking (2020)
- Disillusioned (EP) (2021)
- Sirin (2024)

=== With iamthemorning ===
- ~ (2012)
- Miscellany (EP) (2014)
- Belighted (2014)
- From the House of Arts (live album) (2015)
- Lighthouse (2016)
- Ocean Sounds (Blu-ray) (2018)
- The Bell (2019)
- Counting the Ghosts (EP) (2020)

=== With Maer ===
- Sister (single) (2022)

=== Guest appearances ===
- I Am Waiting For You Last Summer – "Obsessed By" (Edge Party, 2013)
- Celestial Teapot – "Nacreous" (One Big Sky, 2016)
- Echoes and Signals – "Lead Astray" (Monodrama, 2017)
- Subsignal – "Some Kind Of Drowning" (La Muerta, 2018)
- Jordan Rudess – "Angels in the Sky", "I'll Be Waiting" (Wired for Madness, 2019)
- Charlie Cawood – "Falling into Blue", "Flicker Out Of Being" (Blurring into Motion, 2019)
- Versa – "Voyage" (Voyage) (2022)
- Blackbriar – "Moonflower" (Moonflower) (2024)
