= Sombreros Kiddos =

EP by Sore
- Released: April 5, 2010
- Label: Pura Pura Record

Sore chronology
Ports of Lima (2008)	Sombreros Kiddos (2010)

Professional ratings
Review scores
Source	Rating
Pasar Musik	3/5 stars
Denny Sakrie	3.5/5 stars

Sombreros Kiddos is an EP released by the band Sore. It was released in April 2010 under the Pura Pura Record label.

== Track listing ==
1. "Silly Little Thing" (featuring Atilia Haron)
2. "The Hitman" (featuring Mian Tiara)
3. "Bogor Biru" (DJ Oreo Remixed)
4. "Mata Berdebu"
5. "Funk the Hole" (live from Riot on Air Prambors Radio)
6. "Apatis Ria" (Ape-O-Tease-Ria Remix)

== Personnel ==
- Ade Firza Paloh - guitar, vocals
- Awan Garnida - bass, vocals
- Ramondo Gascaro, - keyboards, vocals
- Reza Dwi Putranto - guitar, vocals
- Bemby Gusti Pramudya - drums, vocals
- Dono Firman - synthesizer, keyboards, guitar
