= Iamthemorning =

Russian progressive rock/chamber pop duo

iamthemorning
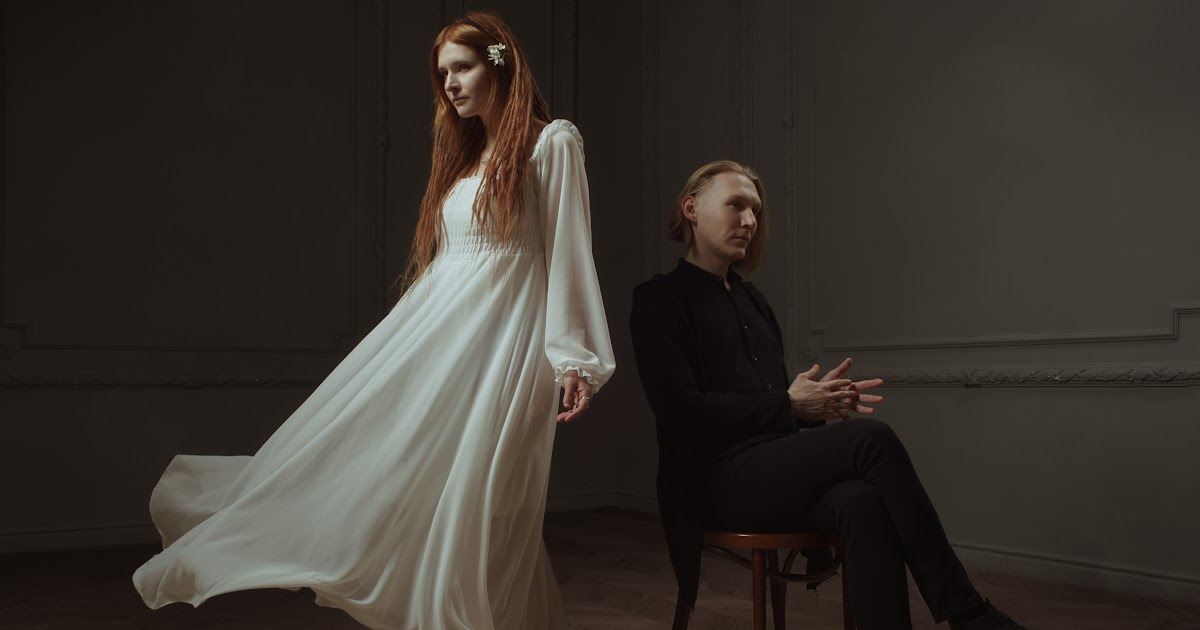
- Gleb Kolyadin and Marjana Semkina

Background information
- Origin: Saint Petersburg, Russia
- Genres: Progressive rock, chamber pop, acoustic rock
- Years active: 2010–present
- Label: Kscope
- Members: Marjana Semkina; Gleb Kolyadin
- Website: iamthemorning.com

iamthemorning is a Russian progressive rock/chamber pop duo formed in 2010, consisting of singer Marjana Semkina and pianist Gleb Kolyadin.

== Biography ==
The duo formed at the start of the 2010. Their name was taken from the song "I Am the Morning" from Oceansize's debut release, Effloresce. The band self-released their debut album, ~, in April 2012.

The second studio album, Belighted, was released by Kscope in September 2014. Recorded and mixed in London by Marcel van Limbeek (Tori Amos), the album features drummer Gavin Harrison from Porcupine Tree. Their third studio album, Lighthouse, features bassist Colin Edwin, also from Porcupine Tree, and vocalist Mariusz Duda from Riverside in addition to Harrison and Limbeek. The band has produced all three albums themselves.

The band supported Riverside, Árstíðir, and Gazpacho on their autumn 2015 tour.

The band won Album of the Year for their album Lighthouse at the 2016 Progressive Music Awards.

== Musical style ==
Iamthemorning's music is generally described as "chamber prog" or "chamber progressive rock" both by reviewers and the band themselves, in reference to the band's combination of progressive rock music and chamber music. Although Marjana Semkina and Gleb Kolyadin are the only official members of the band, iamthemorning typically include several other instruments such as guitar, bass, drums, string quartets, and various wind instruments.

== Discography ==
Studio albums

- ~ (2012)
- Belighted (2014)
- Lighthouse (2016)
- Ocean Sounds (2018)
- The Bell (2019)

EPs

- Miscellany (2014)
- Counting the Ghosts (2020)

Live Albums

- From the House of Arts (2015)
- Live at St Matthias (2025)

DVDs

- Ocean Sounds (2018)
