= Gleb Kolyadin =

Russian pianist and composer

Gleb Kolyadin Глеб Колядин
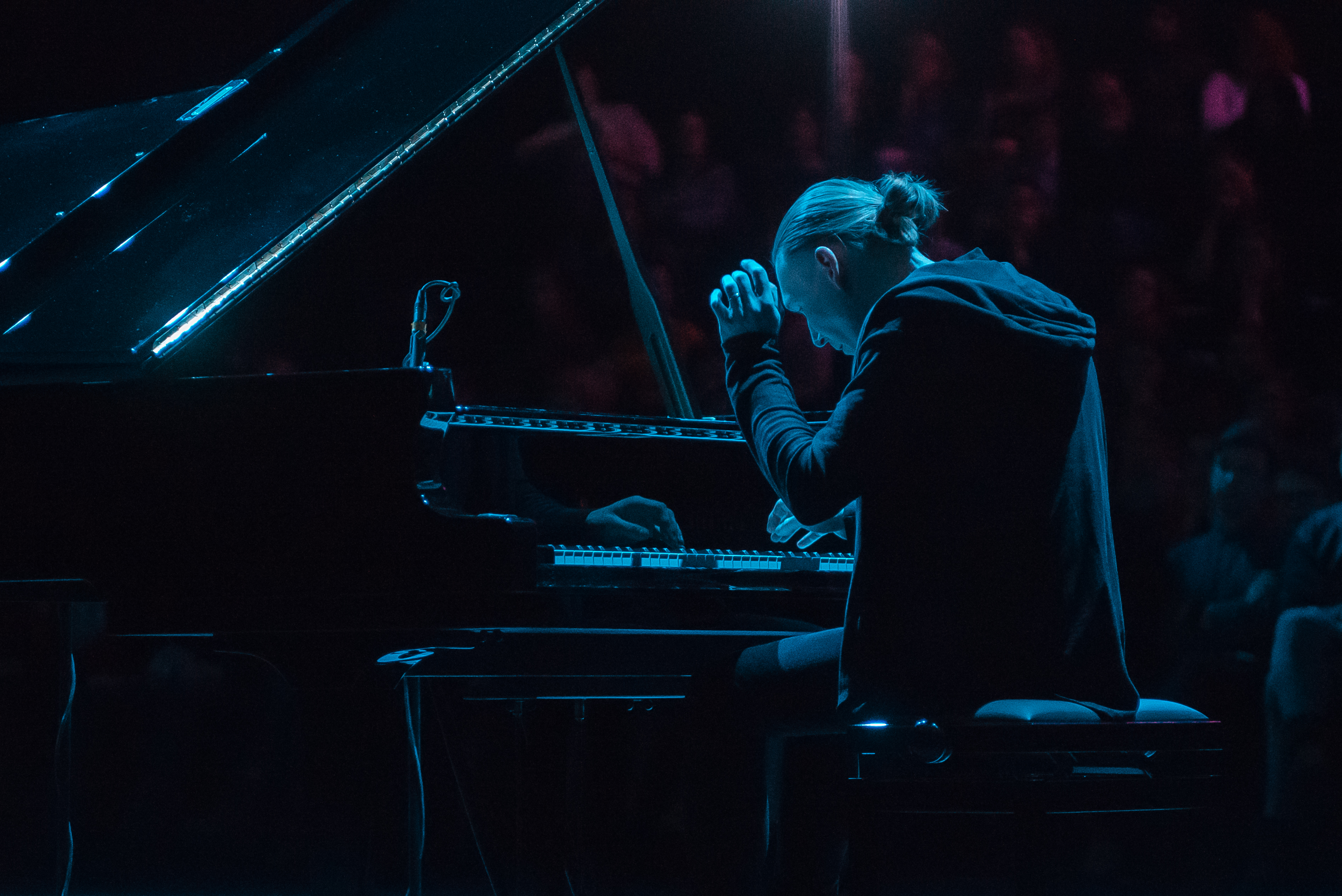

Background information
- Born: Gleb Alekseevich Kolyadin; 11 July 1989 (age 36); Leningrad, RSFSR, USSR
- Genres: Progressive rock, classical, jazz fusion, neoclassical, theatre music
- Occupations: Pianist, composer, arranger
- Instruments: Piano, keyboard
- Label: Kscope
- Website: glebkolyadin.com

Gleb Kolyadin (born Gleb Alekseyevich Kolyadin, Russian: Глеб Алексеевич Колядин, born 11 July 1989) is a Russian pianist, composer, and arranger who mixes progressive rock and jazz fusion with neoclassical styles. He has released music both as a solo artist and as a member of the prog duo iamthemorning.

== Biography ==
Gleb Kolyadin was born on 11 July 1989 in the Soviet city of Leningrad (now Saint Petersburg). He studied classical piano at the Saint Petersburg Conservatory under Professor Vladimir Polyakov, graduating in 2015. Since 2010, he has been the composer and pianist of the two-piece progressive rock group iamthemorning, which won Prog magazine's "Album of the Year" at the Progressive Music Awards in 2016.

Kolyadin has played many concerts in Russia and Europe since 2011, collaborating with musicians and artists such as Árstíðir (Iceland), Gazpacho (Norway), Balmorhea (US), Djivan Gasparyan (Armenia), and Riverside (Poland). He joined the tango ensemble Orquesta Primavera in 2013, which was the ensemble behind the first regular Russian milonga with live music - "Milonga la Primavera".

Kolyadin started composing music for theatrical performances in 2015, and has written works for the Alexandrinsky Theatre, the Saint Petersburg Comedy Theatre, and the Volkov Theatre in Yaroslavl, as well as the projection show Así es Michoacán (Mexico). He is an active performer in the world of modern classical music, and has played the Russian debuts of many compositions, including Textures by Paul Lansky, 2×5 by Steve Reich, Tubular Bells II by Mike Oldfield, and more.

In 2018, he released his first solo album Gleb Kolyadin on the British label Kscope. A number of prominent prog musicians participated in the recording: drummer Gavin Harrison (King Crimson, Porcupine Tree), bass player Nick Beggs and saxophonist Theo Travis of Steven Wilson's solo band, keyboardist Jordan Rudess (Dream Theater), and vocalists Steve Hogarth (Marillion) and Mick Moss (Antimatter). The album ranked 15th in Prog magazine's Top 50 2018 albums list and was shortlisted for the Progressive Music Awards in two categories – Album of the Year and International Band/Artist of the Year.

As part of the project Eidolon, Kolyadin recorded music for an exhibition of works by artist Arseny Blinov, held at the New Stage of the Alexandrinsky Theater. He has recorded with the band The Grand Astoria and has recorded several compositions by Dmitry Maksimachev. In 2018, Kolyadin was a guest musician on the song "Prayers of the Dead" by Bi-2 and Boris Grebenshchikov. In the summer of 2019, he was a composer on Diana Vishneva's Context Project.

In 2019 and 2020 Kolyadin was voted best keyboardist of the year by readers of Prog magazine.

Kolyadin's Three Miniatures with the string arrangement by Grigory Losenkov was performed by OpensoundOrchestra on December 1, 2020, at the Zaryadye Concert Hall in Moscow as a part of the "PULSE" concert series featuring works by contemporary composers and important works of the turn of the XX-XXI centuries.

On March 26, 2021, he released his second solo project water movements as a means of funding his third album the Outland (released in November 2022). In February 2025, he released his fourth solo album Mobula through Kscope.

== Discography ==
=== Gleb Kolyadin ===
- Gleb Kolyadin (2018)
- water movements (2021)
- the Outland (2022)
- Mobula (2025)

=== Iamthemorning ===
- ~ (2012)
- Miscellany (EP) (2014)
- Belighted (2014)
- From the House of Arts (Live) (2015)
- Lighthouse (2016)
- Ocean Sounds (Blu-Ray) (2018)
- The Bell (2019)
- Counting the Ghosts (EP) (2020)
- Live at St Matthias (Live) (2025)

=== poloniumcubes ===
- one (EP) (2014)
- two (EP) (2015)
- three (EP) (2015)
- music for Arseny Blinov’s abstract art (EP) (2018)
- four (EP) (2018)
- five (OST) (2019)
- six (2020)
- seven (2020)
- eight (2022)
- nine (2024)
- ten (2024)

=== Music for theatre ===
- Shirley Valentine (2016, Saint Petersburg Comedy Theatre, directed by Andrzej Bubien)
- Amadeus (2017, Omsk Academic Drama Theatre, directed by Andrzej Bubien)
- Six Characters in Search of an Author (2018, Russian State Academic Drama Theatre n.a. Fyodor Volkov, Yaroslavl, directed by Andrzej Bubien)
- Contact (2019, ballet, New Stage of the Alexandrinsky Theatre, choreographer Ernest Nurgali)
- The Seven Who Were Hanged, (2019, Educational Theater of the Russian State Institute for the Arts, directed by Andrzej Bubien)
- Forest (2019, ballet, Hermitage Theatre, choreographer Ernest Nurgali)
- Visit of the Lady (2020, Omsk Academic Drama Theatre, directed by Andrzej Bubien)
- Fox PEACE (2020, Theatre TSEKH, directed by Yulia Kalandarishvili)
- Wolves and Sheep (2020, The Baltic House Festival Theatre, directed by Andrzej Bubien)
- The Kiss of Irukandji (2021, Arkhangelsk Youth Theater of V.P. Panov, directed by Yulia Kalandarishvili)
- Fathers and Sons (2021, Russian State Academic Drama Theatre n.a. Fyodor Volkov, Yaroslavl, directed by Andrzej Bubien)
- Fat Lyuba (2021, Bol'shoy Teatr Kukol, directed by Yulia Kalandarishvili)
- The Kindest in the World (2021, Krasnoyarsk Theater for Young Spectators, directed by Yulia Kalandarishvili)
- In the Rays (2021, Lensovet Theatre, directed by Andrzej Bubien)
- The Snow Queen (2021, Lensovet Theatre, directed by Evgenia Boginskaya)
- Light from the Sky (2022, Lenfilm, directed by Andrzej Bubien)
- Witness for the Prosecution (2022, Baltic House Festival Theatre, directed by Vladimir Zhukov)
- Nora (2022, National Drama Theater of Karelia, directed by Andrzej Bubien)
- The Naked King (2022, Russian Drama Theater of Udmurtia, directed by Denis Khusniyarov)
- Oblomov (2023, Russian State Academic Drama Theatre n.a. Fyodor Volkov, Yaroslavl, directed by Andrzej Bubien)
- Mu-Mu (2023, Kurgan Drama Theatre, directed by Denis Khusniyarov)
- Children of Olympus (2023, Primorsky Krai Youth Drama Theatre, directed by Yulia Kalandarishvili)
- Tanya (2023, Baltic House, directed by Vaclav Dembovsky)
- School for Fools (2024, Ulyanovsk Drama Theatre named after I. Goncharov, directed by Artyom Ustinov)
- Little Tragedies (2024, Tyumen Drama Theatre, directed by Andrzej Bubien)
- Myshkin. Another Story (2024, Educational Theater of the Russian State Institute for the Arts — student production directed by Andrzej Bubien)
- Griboedov. Woe to Wit (2025, Tomsk Theatre for Young Audiences, directed by Artyom Ustinov)
- The Elder Son (2026, Nizhny Tagil Drama Theatre, directed by Kama Kutsyk)

=== Collaborations ===
- Evan Carson – Ocipinski (2019)
- Kurtki Kobeyna (Куртки Кобейна) (2019)
- The Legendary Flower Punk - Wabi Wu (2019)
- Jambi – Alive (2020)
- The Grand Astoria - From the Great Beyond (EP) (2020)
- Nechotnyy voin (Нечётный воин) - Odd Warrior 4. Part 1 (2020)
- Bi-2 - "We don't need a hero" (Maxi-single) (2021)
- The Legendary Flower Punk – Zen Variations (Anniversary Edition) (2021)
- Bi-2 - "I don't trust anyone" (EP), as part of Iamthemorning (2022)
- Bi-2 - "Hallelujah" (2022)
- Nechotnyy voin - "Snow for the New Year" (single) (2022)
- Nechotnyy voin - Odd Warrior 5 (2023)
- Bi-2 - Mashup (live) (2023)
- From Grotto – Monuments of Our Time (2023)
- Nechotnyy Voin – Odd Warrior 6 (2025)
- Bi-2 – Serdtsebienie (Heartbeat) (2026)
- Bruce Soord – Shipwrecks in the Harbour (2026)
