= Echoes and Signals =

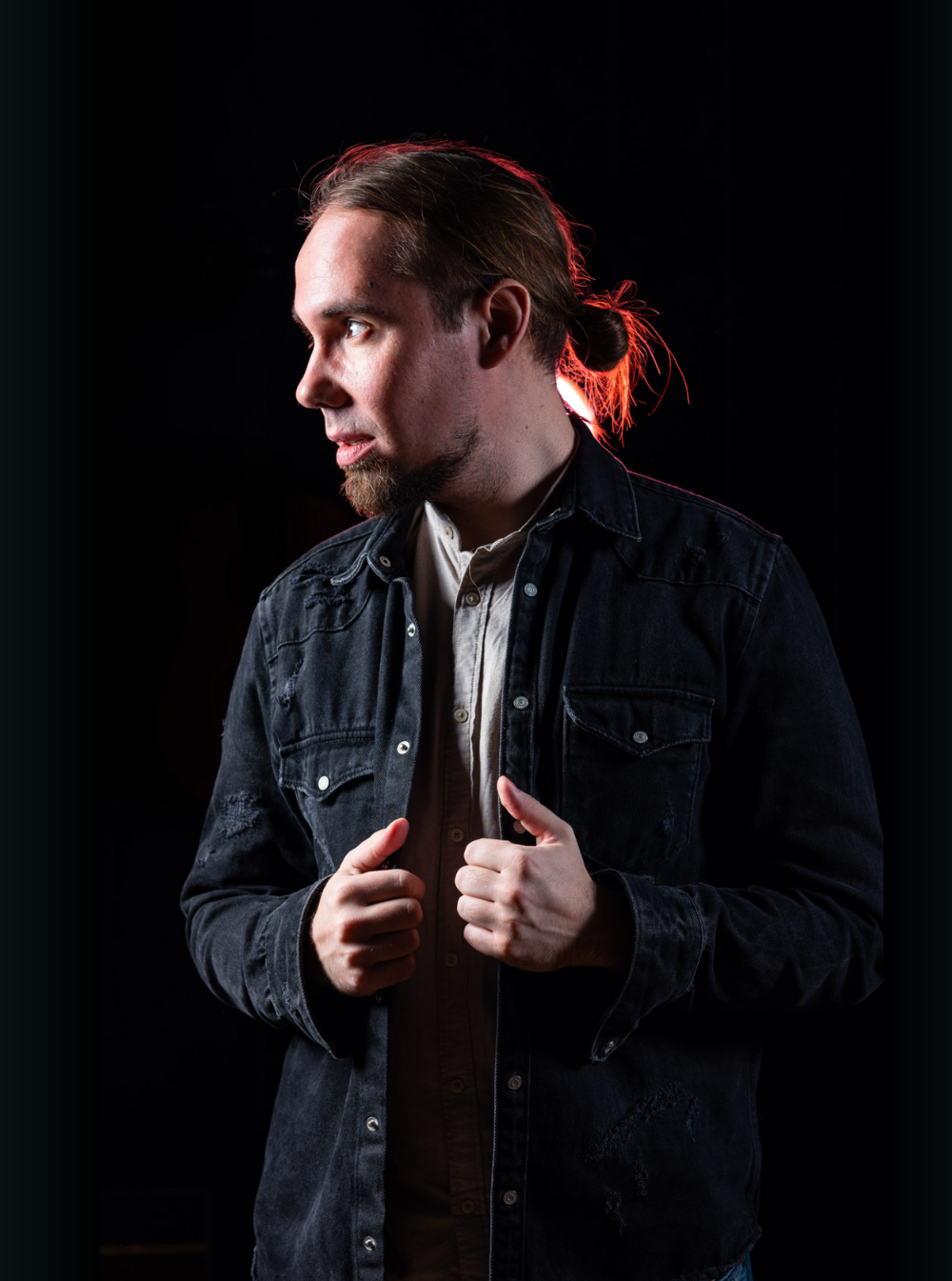
- Fedor Kivokurtsev

Background information
- Also known as: Echoes&Signals
- Origin: Tula, Russia
- Genres: Progressive rock
- Years active: 2012–present
- Labels: Nanobox Records, Magnetic Eye Records
- Members: Fedor Kivokurtsev
- Website: echoesandsignals.com

Echoes and Signals (aka Echoes&Signals) is a musical project by Russian songwriter, guitarist, vocalist and record producer Fedor Kivokurtsev. The project's title refers to the 'unity of opposites' concept, which is the central category of many philosophical discourses

== History ==
The project begins its story in 2012 as an instrumental act drawing inspiration from progressive rock and post/math rock genres. After releasing 2 conceptual EPs "Comma" and "Ouroboros" the first long play album called "V" (reference to the five stages of grief) has been released in 2014.

The second LP "Monodrama" was released in 2017. Album title and concept were referring to psychotherapy method.

During live tours and performances EaS shared a stage with Pain of Salvation, Long Distance Calling, Sólstafir.

The third long play album "Mercurial" was released in 2021 and was signifying the new era for EaS . The album's concept is using the alchemical process as a metaphor for a psychological investigation. The record is featuring vocals in every song and was created in close collaboration with musical and film producer Alexander Perfilyev.

== Discography ==
- Comma (EP, 2012)
- Ouroboros (EP, 2013)
- V (Five) (LP, 2014)
- Monodrama (LP, 2017)
- Mercurial (LP, 2021)
- Lunar (LP, 2023)
- Solar (LP, 2026)

== Personnel ==
- Fedor Kivokurtsev - songwriting, guitar, vocals, keyboards
- Alexey Zaytsev - bass - albums "Comma(2012)", "Ouroboros(2013)", "V(2014)", "Monodrama(2017)", "Mercruial(2021)"
- Yaroslav Egorov - drums - albums "V(2014)", "Monodrama(2017)"
- Vladimir Pozdyshev - drums - albums "Comma(2012)", "Ouroboros(2013)"
- Leo Margarit - drums - album "Mercurial(2021)"
- Alexander Kulkov - drums - album "Lunar(2023)"
- Mariana Semkina - vocals - album "Monodrama(2017)"
- Valentin Berezin(Adaen) - vocals - album "V(2014)"
- Polina Kallerman - vocals - single "Waves Are Coming Home(2015)"
