= Bahngbek =

South Korean indie music duo

- Origin: South Korea
- Genres: Chamber pop; indie rock
- Years active: 2014-present
- Labels: Mirrorball Music
- Members: Bang Joonseok; Bek Hyunjin

Bahngbek (Korean: 방백) is the South Korean supergroup formed by Bang Joonseok and Bek Hyunjin.

== Career ==
Bang Joonseok was a member of U & Me Blue, composed film music for more than 20 years, and Bek Hyunjin released a number of albums with Uhuhboo Project and solo career. They had performed together before the group was formed, and interviewed each other for 3 years to form a duo. The band name was shortened to "Bang Joonseok with Bek Hyunjin". They participated in the soundtrack of the 2014 film Gyeongju.

In 2015, they released their first studio album Your Hands (너의 손). The selection committee for 2017 Korean Music Awards Choi Minwoo described the album as the wonderful "adult" pop that comes up empty and passes through intensely and leaves a long lingering image, and the album nominated for the Best Pop Album. In 2018, they performed at the DMZ Peace Train Music Festival, and in October they performed a solo concert.

== Discography ==
=== Studio albums ===
- Your Hands (너의 손) (2015)
