= Racing Mount Pleasant (album) =

Studio album by Racing Mount Pleasant
- Released: August 15, 2025
- Genres: Indie rock; chamber pop
- Length: 57:30
- Labels: R&R

Racing Mount Pleasant chronology
Grip Your Fist, I'm Heaven Bound (2022)	Racing Mount Pleasant (2025)

Singles from Racing Mount Pleasant
- 1. "Call It Easy" Released: April 9, 2025; 2. "Racing Mount Pleasant" Released: May 9, 2025; 3. "Your New Place" Released: July 11, 2025

Racing Mount Pleasant is the self-titled second (Note: Some sources describe Racing Mount Pleasant as their debut album, due to the band changing their name; they released one album under the name Kingfisher.) album by the American indie band Racing Mount Pleasant. Following their 2022 album Grip Your Fist, I'm Heaven Bound, it was released on August 15, 2025 on the record label R&R, and was preceded by three singles. It received generally positive reviews from critics, who frequently compared it to the work of Black Country, New Road, Arcade Fire, and Bon Iver.

== Background and release ==
Racing Mount Pleasant formed under the name Kingfisher in 2019 at the University of Michigan; in November 2022, they released their debut album Grip Your Fist, I'm Heaven Bound. On April 9, 2025, they changed their name to Racing Mount Pleasant, coinciding with the release of the single "Call It Easy". On May 9, they released a second single, the self-titled "Racing Mount Pleasant"; it was written before the band's name change. They also announced that they would be releasing an album on the record label R&R. The single "Your New Place" was released on July 11, accompanied by the announcement that Racing Mount Pleasant would be released on August 15.

== Style and composition ==
Racing Mount Pleasant has been described as big band, folk rock, indie rock, baroque pop, chamber pop, and a mix of post-rock and Midwest emo. It has frequently been compared to Black Country, New Road Arcade Fire, and Bon Iver. The album's tracks were written over the course of the band's entire existence; some were omitted from Grip Your Fist only because they were yet to be recorded. Songs were composed by repeating sections many times until a natural transition to another section manifested. The album was recorded in at least six different spaces, including a bandmember's attic and a church.

Racing Mount Pleasant were inspired by memories and looking back on the band's history while composing Racing Mount Pleasant, creating what Stereogum describes as a "miniverse". According to Paste, the album explores two memories of a romantic relationship: waking up next to a partner, and visiting them after ending the relationship. There are references to other songs throughout the lyrics, instrumentals, and song titles; for example, the melody of "Your New Place" is repeated on the closing track, "Your Old Place".

== Reception ==
Professional ratings
Review scores
Source	Rating
Paste	8.2/10
Pitchfork	6.3/10

Racing Mount Pleasant received generally positive reviews from critics. In a review for The New Yorker, Hanif Abdurraqib drew comparisons between the album and the poem "Katy" by Frank O'Hara, stating that the band had become "quieter and also less silent" since their debut (a reference to the fifth line of "Katy"). Abdurraqib did not feel like he had learnt anything by listening to the album, as many of the themes were "unspectacular", but felt "delighted by the experience nonetheless". David Renshaw of The Fader praised the album's "grand crescendos fit for cavernous arenas", describing "Your New Place" as "like a garage rock band swapping the dive bar for an orchestra pit". In her interview article of the band for Stereogum, Margaret Farrell applauded the album's ability to evoke memories of the past, stating that "these songs move like memory: animated, all-encompassing, unpredictable". Ben Jardine of Paste awarded the album an 8.2/10, describing it as a "sprawling but self-assured" concept album and praising its cinematic arrangements and dynamic shifts. Ian Cohen's review for Pitchfork was much more mixed, giving the album a 6.3/10; he praised the "panoramic sweep of post-rock" on "Your New Place", but disliked that the album was too similar to bands such as Arcade Fire, Bon Iver, and Black Country, New Road, stating "it sounds like a group working hard to make a cathartic, cleansing instant classic of [an album], but one drawn from memory". Cohen also believed that songs such as "You" and "Call It Easy" didn't have a compelling narrator, describing them as "glacial". However, he concluded that "bands and albums of this nature don't come around all that often".

== Track listing ==
All lyrics are written by Sam DuBose.

No.	Title	Length
1.	"Your New Place"	7:32
2.	"Tenspeed (Shallows)"	3:51
3.	"Heavy Red"	1:30
4.	"Emily"	5:55
5.	"Seminary"	4:56
6.	"You"	4:07
7.	"You Pt. 2"	4:07
8.	"Racing Mount Pleasant"	5:15
9.	"Call It Easy"	7:00
10.	"Outlast"	5:01
11.	"34th Floor"	1:31
12.	"Seyburn"	2:12
13.	"Your Old Place"	4:33
Total length:		57:30

== Personnel ==
Adapted from Bandcamp.

=== Racing Mount Pleasant ===
- Casey Cheatham – drums, background vocals
- Kaysen Chown – strings, harmonium, synth guitar, background vocals
- Sam DuBose – guitar, piano, vocals
- Connor Hoyt – alto saxophone, flute, background vocals
- Callum Roberts – trumpet, guitar, background vocals
- Tyler Thenstedt – bass, slide guitar, background vocals
- Samuel Uribe Botero – tenor saxophone, piano, synth, background vocals, engineering

=== Additional musicians ===
- Ben Lafo – trombone (on "Seminary")
- Ian Eylanbekov – electric guitar (on "Outlast")

=== Technical personnel ===
- Emelia Piane – additional engineering
- Wes Millhouse – additional engineering
- Gavin Ryan – additional engineering
- Collin Dupuis – mixing
- Felix Davis – mastering

== Charts ==
Chart performance for Racing Mount Pleasant
Chart (2026)	Peak position
UK Record Store (OCC)	29
