= Lighthouse (iamthemorning album) =

Studio album by iamthemorning
- Released: 1 April 2016
- Studio: Murder Mile Studios in London (England); Mosfilm Studio in Moscow (Russia); Serakos Studio in Warsaw (Poland); Galernaya 20 Studio and Red-Wave Studio in Saint Petersburg (Russia).
- Genre: Progressive rock, chamber pop
- Length: 47:24
- Label: Kscope
- Producer: iamthemorning

Iamthemorning chronology
From the House of Arts (2014)	Lighthouse (2016)

Lighthouse is the third studio album by Russian chamber progressive band iamthemorning. It was released on 1 April 2016 through Kscope. It features several guest musicians, including Gavin Harrison and Colin Edwin from Porcupine Tree, as well as Mariusz Duda from Riverside.

The album was primarily recorded at Murder Mile Studios in London and Mosfilm Studios in Moscow, mixed at Murder Mile Studio, mastered by Marcel van Limbeek and Neil Pickles at Reveal Sound Studios in London and produced by iamthemorning. The album was premiered by AllMusic on 30 March 2016.

== Reception ==
Professional ratings
Review scores
Source	Rating
AllMusic	4/5 stars
Echoes and Dust	(favorable)
The Metalist	(favorable)
Eclipsed	8.5/10 stars

The album was positively received by critics, with favorable reviews and complimentary comments from specialized music sites such as AllMusic, the indie music site Echoes and Dust, or the UK metal blog The Metalist.

AllMusic gave the album a 4 out of 5 score, and Thom Jurek's review emphasizes that while "The music on Lighthouse is more restrained than on earlier albums ... The control executed over pace, narrative, and arrangements is remarkably consistent and strong, making the set an inseparable whole...", and then concludes that "Despite referencing sounds familiar to many, this piano-and-vocal duo carve out a persona that's unmistakably their own."

On 1 September Lighthouse won album of the year at TeamRock's 2016 Progressive Music Awards.

== Track listing ==
All tracks are written by iamthemorning

No.	Title	Length
1.	"I Came Before the Water Pt I"	1:41
2.	"Too Many Years"	5:10
3.	"Clear Clearer"	4:35
4.	"Sleeping Pills"	3:43
5.	"Libretto Horror"	2:13
6.	"Lighthouse" (feat. Mariusz Duda)	6:13
7.	"Harmony"	5:18
8.	"Matches"	4:18
9.	"Belighted"	3:26
10.	"Chalk and Coal"	4:57
11.	"I Came Before the Water Pt II"	2:56
12.	"Post Scriptum"	2:43
Total length:		47:24

== Personnel ==
iamthemorning

- Gleb Kolyadin - grand piano, keyboards
- Marjana Semkina - lead and backing vocals

Guest musicians

- Gavin Harrison - drums
- Colin Edwin - bass
- Vlad Avy - guitars
- Evan Carson - bodhrán and percussion
- Andres Izmailov - harp
- Tatiana Rezetdinova - flute
- Roman Erofeev - clarinet
- Sergey Korolkov - trumpet
- Oksana Stepanova - bombard
- Philipp Saulin - violin
- Mikhail Ignatov - cello
- Mariusz Duda - vocals

Production

- Marcel van Limbeek - mixing, mastering
- Gianluca Capacchione - mixing
- Vlad Avy - mixing
- Neil Pickles - mixing, mastering
- Constantine Nagishkin - artwork
- Mikhail Meerov - design

Strings Ensemble

- Violins: Anastasia Razumets, Aleksandra Svidunovich, Zhuldyz Bukina, Tatiana Kuvaitseva, Philipp Saulin
- Violas: Aleksander Bogdanovich, Ksenia Ivanova
- Cellos: Mikhail Ignatov, Evgenia Ignatova
- Double bass: Alexander Kuznetcov

"Perezvony" Choir (featured on Sleeping pills)

- Larisa Yarutskaya - conductor and art-director

Stanislava Sorokina, Svetlana Utkina, Yury Volkov, Maria Cherepanova, Elizaveta Levina, Anastasia Andriyanenko, Daria Severinova, Alina Vahrina, Anastasia Kavalerova, Nikol Zgeib, Anna Sokolova, Anastasia Malova, Sofia Liberman, Margarita Raspopova, Martin Sadomirsky, Svetlana Philippova, Serafima Chervotkina
