= From the House of Arts =

Live album by iamthemorning
- Released: 23 October 2015
- Recorded: House of Arts in Moscow on 31 October 2014
- Genre: Progressive rock, Chamber pop
- Length: 41:56
- Label: self-released
- Producer: iamthemorning

Iamthemorning chronology
Belighted (2014)	From the House of Arts (2015)	Lighthouse (2016)

From the House of Arts is a live album by chamber progressive band iamthemorning. The album is a live recording of the House of Arts performance of Belighted, recorded on 31 October 2014. The album was funded through Kickstarter and released on 23 October 2015.

== Track listing ==
All songs written and produced by iamthemorning.

No.	Title	Length
1.	"The Howler"	5:20
2.	"Circles"	3:28
3.	"Romance"	3:52
4.	"The Simple Story"	4:01
5.	"Scotland"	4:12
6.	"5/4"	3:51
7.	"Gerda"	4:53
8.	"K.O.S."	6:06
9.	"Reprise of Light / No Light"	6:13
Total length:		41:56

== Personnel ==
iamthemorning

- Gleb Kolyadin - grand piano, keyboards
- Marjana Semkina - vocals, backing vocals

Additional musicians

- Vlad Avy - guitar
- Anton Glushkin - acoustic guitar
- Max Roudenko - bass
- Mikhail Istratov - drums
- Philipp Saulin - violin
- Mikhail Ignatov – cello

Production

- Vlad Avy – mixing
- Constantine Nagishkin – artwork
- Marcel van Limbeek – engineering
- Anna Pavluk – engineering
