= Pugwash =

Pugwash may refer to:

Places

- Pugwash, Nova Scotia, a village in Cumberland County (and site of the first Pugwash Conferences)
- Pugwash Junction, an unincorporated community bordering the village

Organizations

- Pugwash Conferences on Science and World Affairs, international scientific discussion group
- International Student/Young Pugwash, international student organization
- Student Pugwash USA, US student organization

Entertainment

- Pugwash (band), Irish pop band
- Captain Pugwash, children's animated cartoon series
- John Patrick "Pugwash" Weathers, Welsh rock drummer
