= Your Hands =

Studio album by Bahngbek
- Released: 28 December 2015
- Genre: Chamber pop; indie rock
- Length: 53:16
- Label: Mirrorball Music

Your Hands (Korean: 너의 손; RR: Neoeui son) is the debut studio album by South Korean indie music duo Bahngbek. The album was released on 28 December 2015.

== Background ==
Bang Joonseok and Bek Hyunjin have had musical exchanges with each other since 1996, and they formed the group in 2014. Most of the tracks were recorded on a one-take basis. They recorded the way they worked on the album in an "open way," and they continued to engage in constant communication with sessions participating in the album. Bassist Seo Youngdo, drummer Shin Seokcheol, keyboardist Yoon Seokcheol, organist Lim Jihoon, saxophonist Kim Oki, clarinetist Son Seongje, and violinist Lim Gajin participated in the album.

== Critical reception ==
Professional ratings
Review scores
Source	Rating
IZM	4/5 stars

Kim Banya of IZM reviewed Your Hands is not just about throwing up in the first place, the album is accumulation of experience and it's about bleeding training. Cho Jihwan of Weiv described the album as "A work that has written down common landscapes in common languages, but has dug into more intimate places". The selection committee for 2017 Korean Music Awards Choi Minwoo described the album as the wonderful "adult" pop that comes up empty and passes through intensely and leaves a long lingering image, and the album nominated for the Best Pop Album.

== Track listing ==
No.	Title	Length
1.	"Direction" ("방향")	4:57
2.	"Promise" ("다짐")	5:14
3.	"Darkness" ("어둠")	7:26
4.	"State of Heart" ("심정")	5:22
5.	"Transformation" ("변신")	6:25
6.	"Han-River" ("한강")	5:10
7.	"Coming Hone" ("귀가")	4:32
8.	"Wish" ("바람")	4:04
9.	"A Song" ("아송")	3:27
10.	"Neighborhood" ("동네")	6:39
