= Racing Mount Pleasant =

American indie band

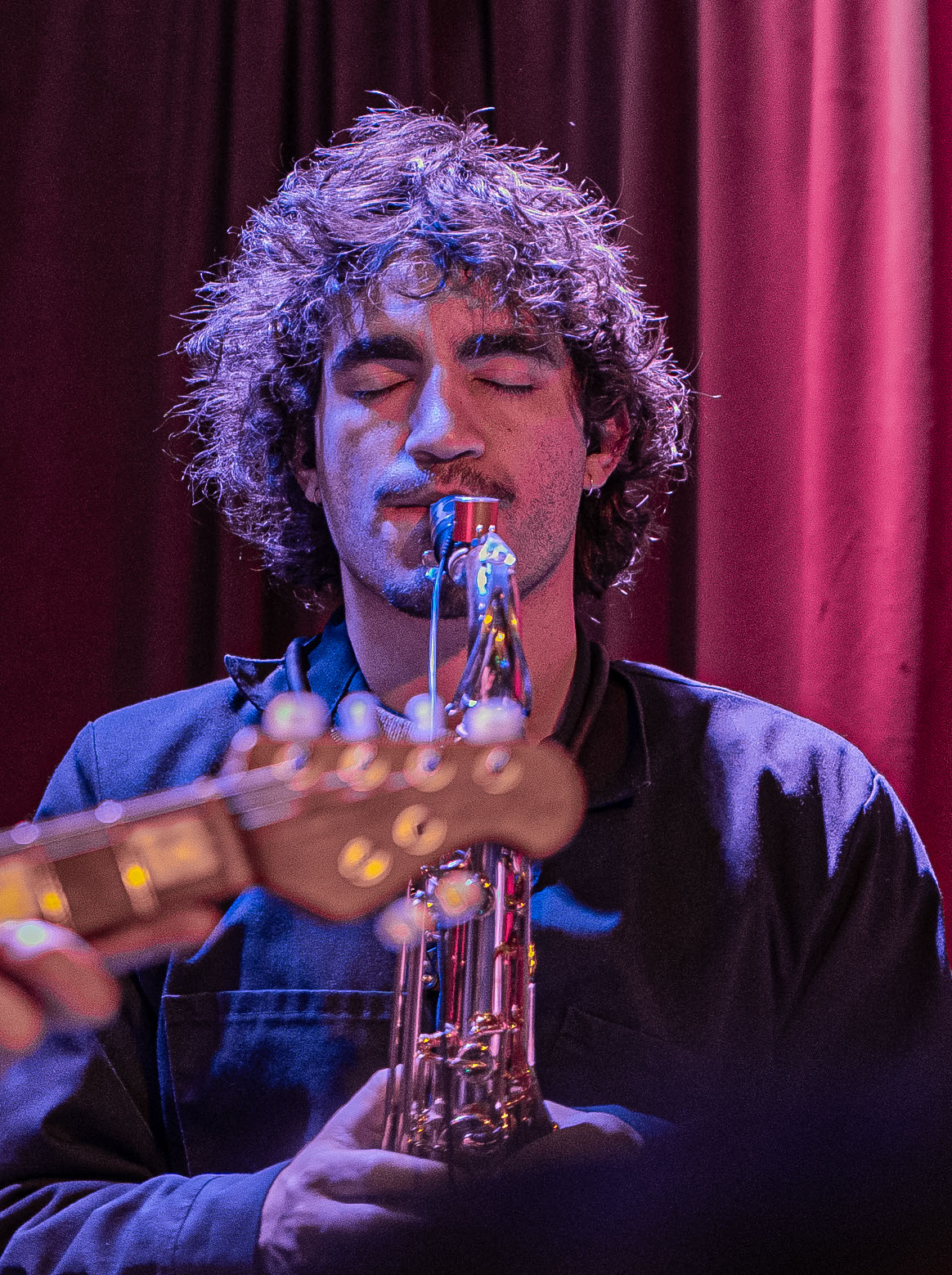
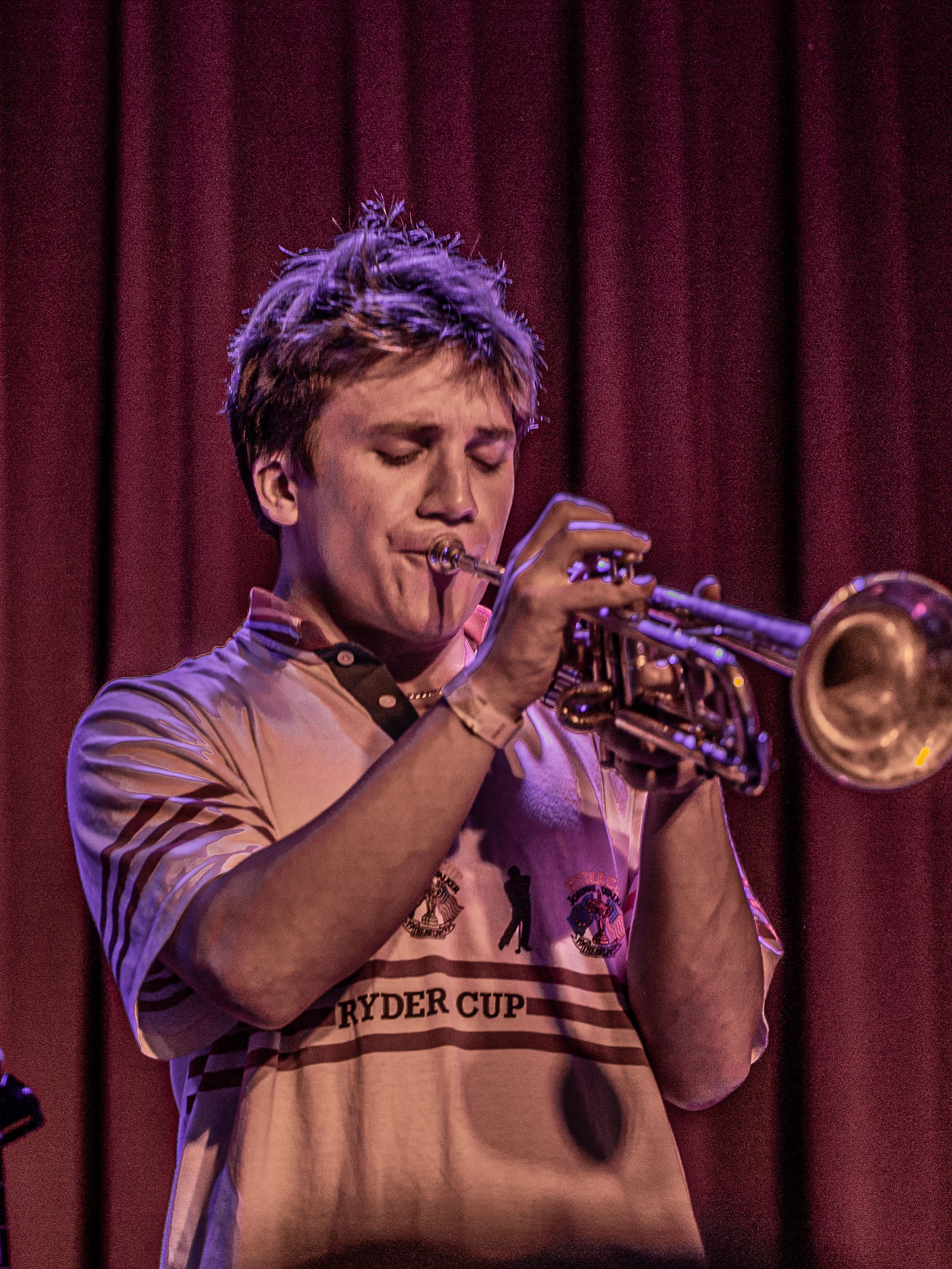
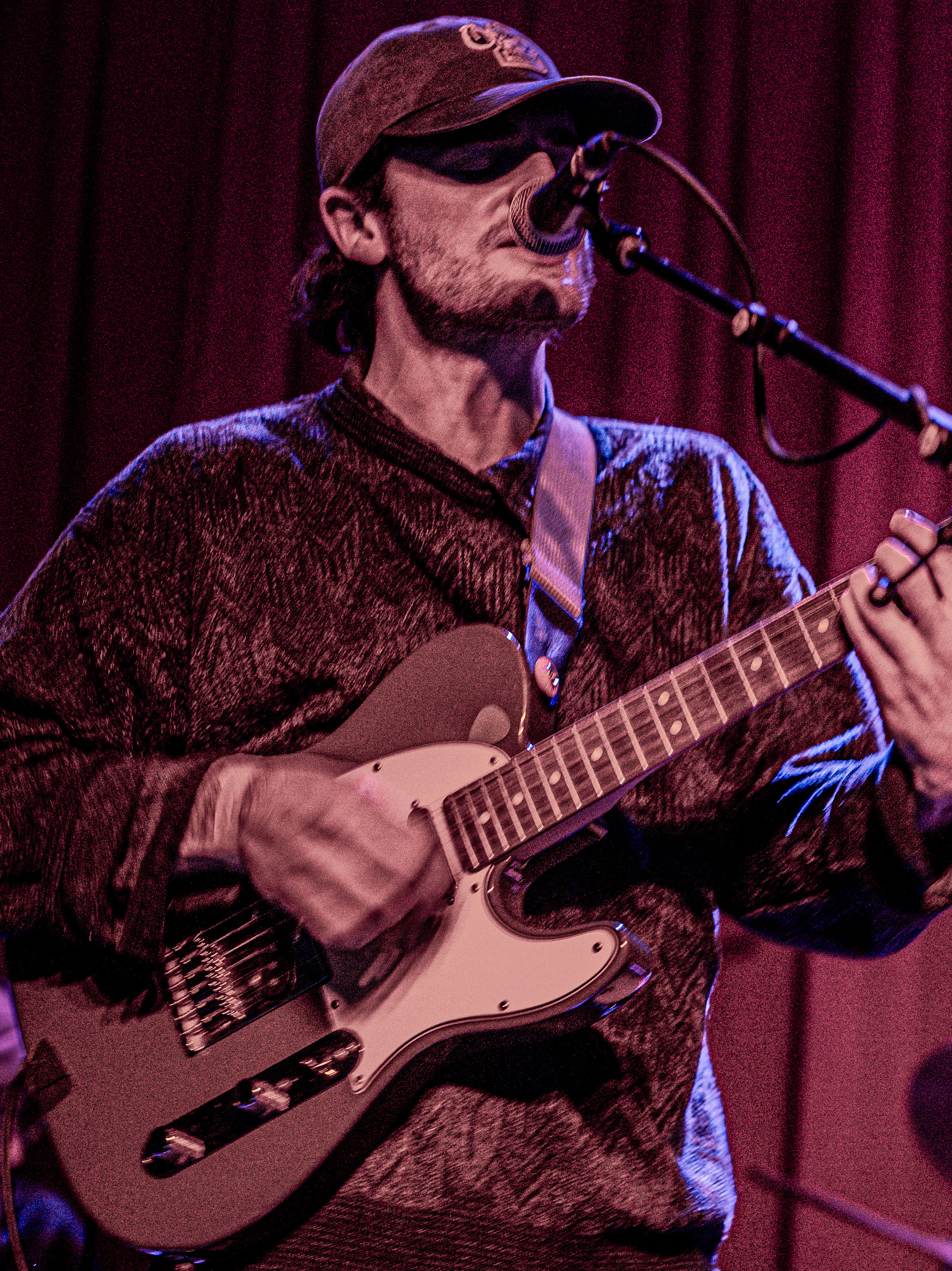
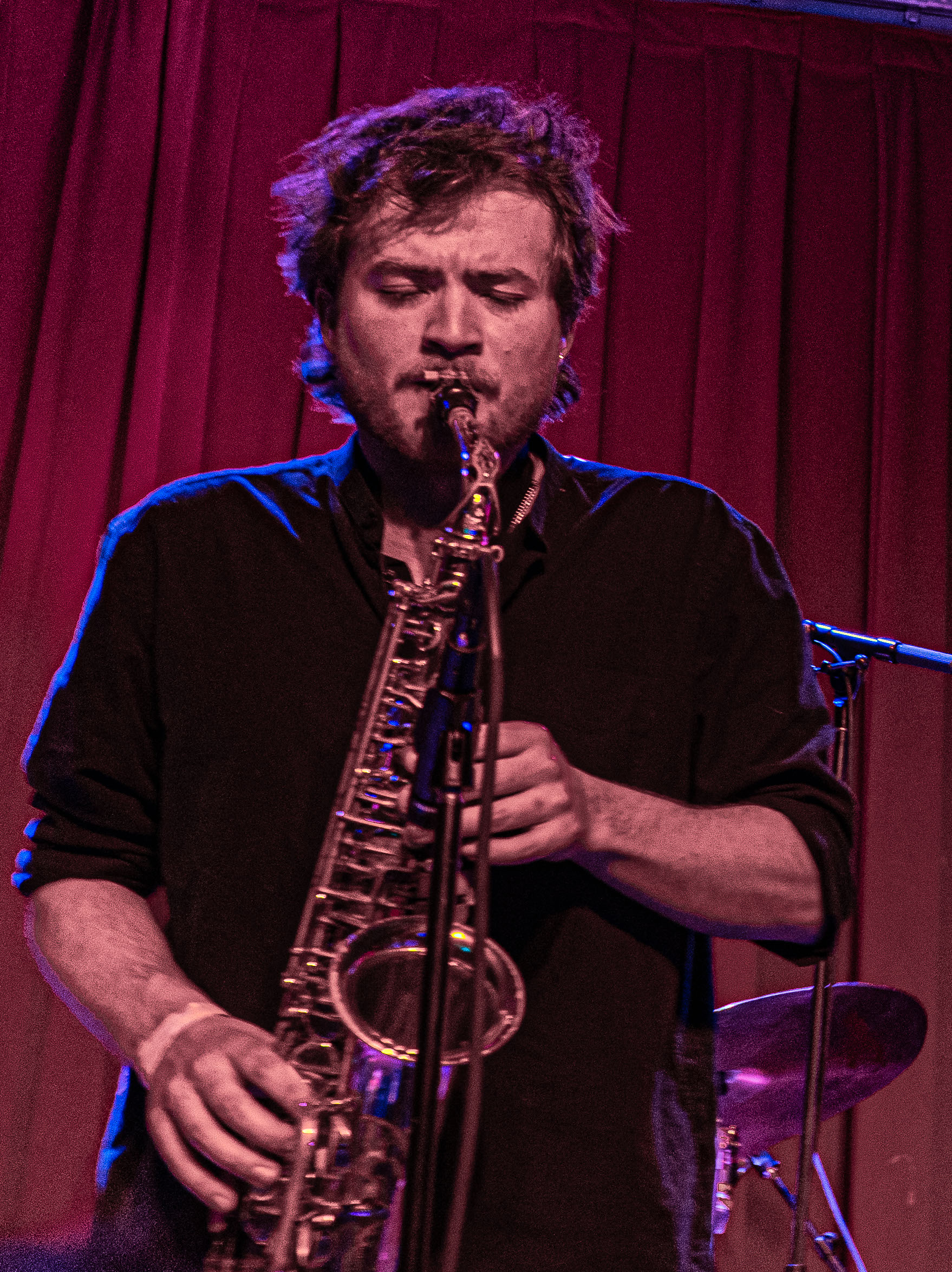
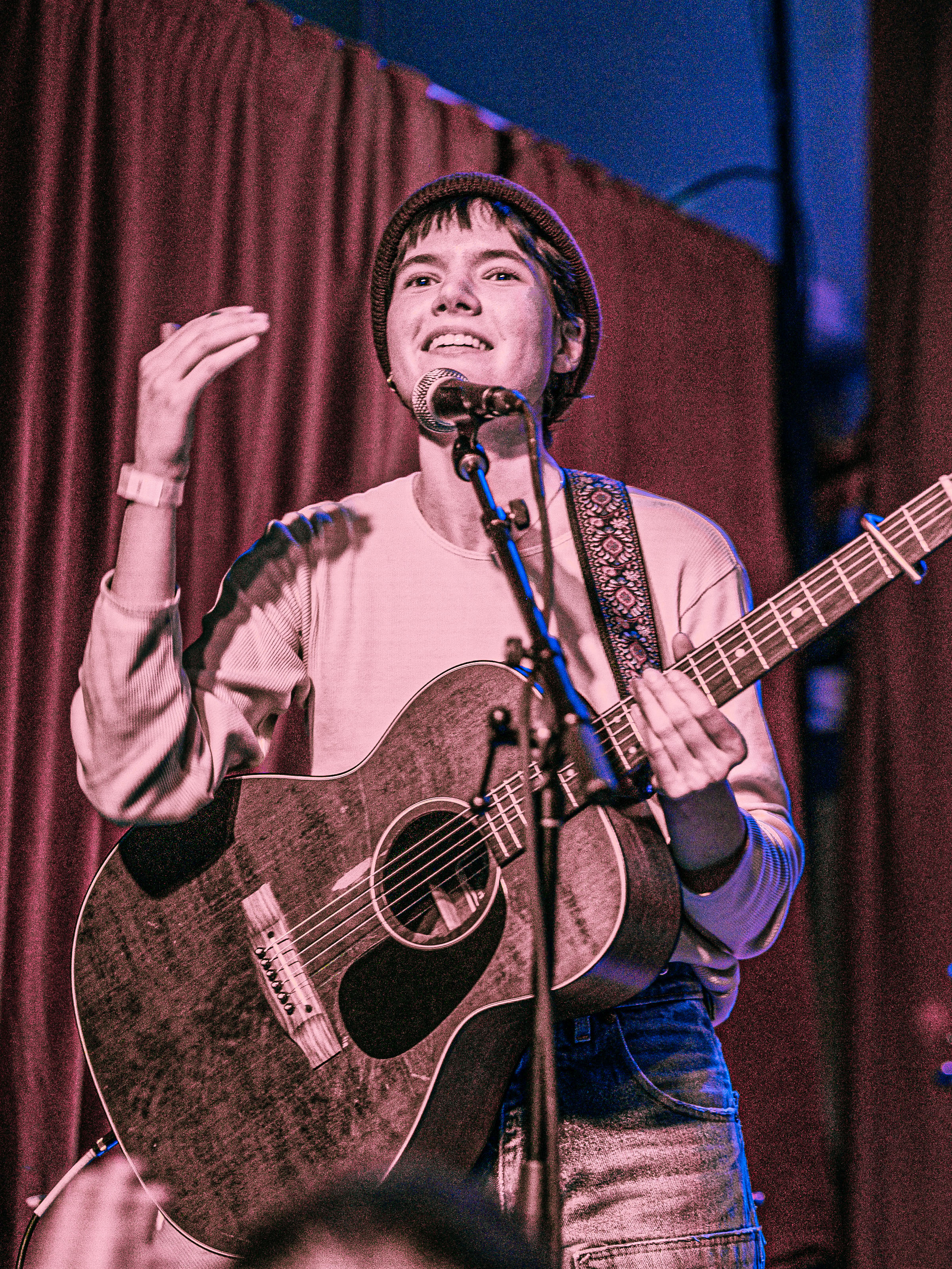
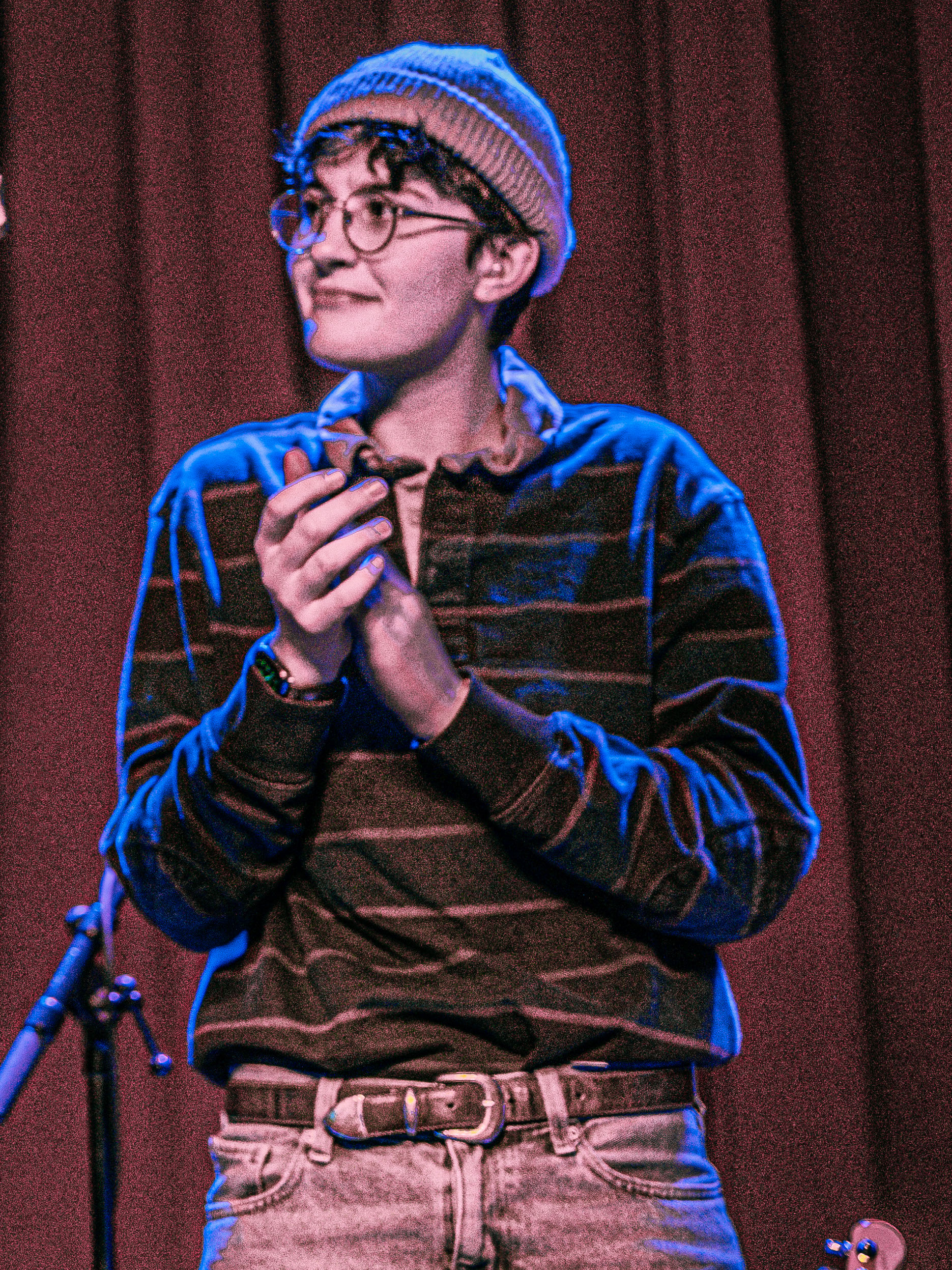
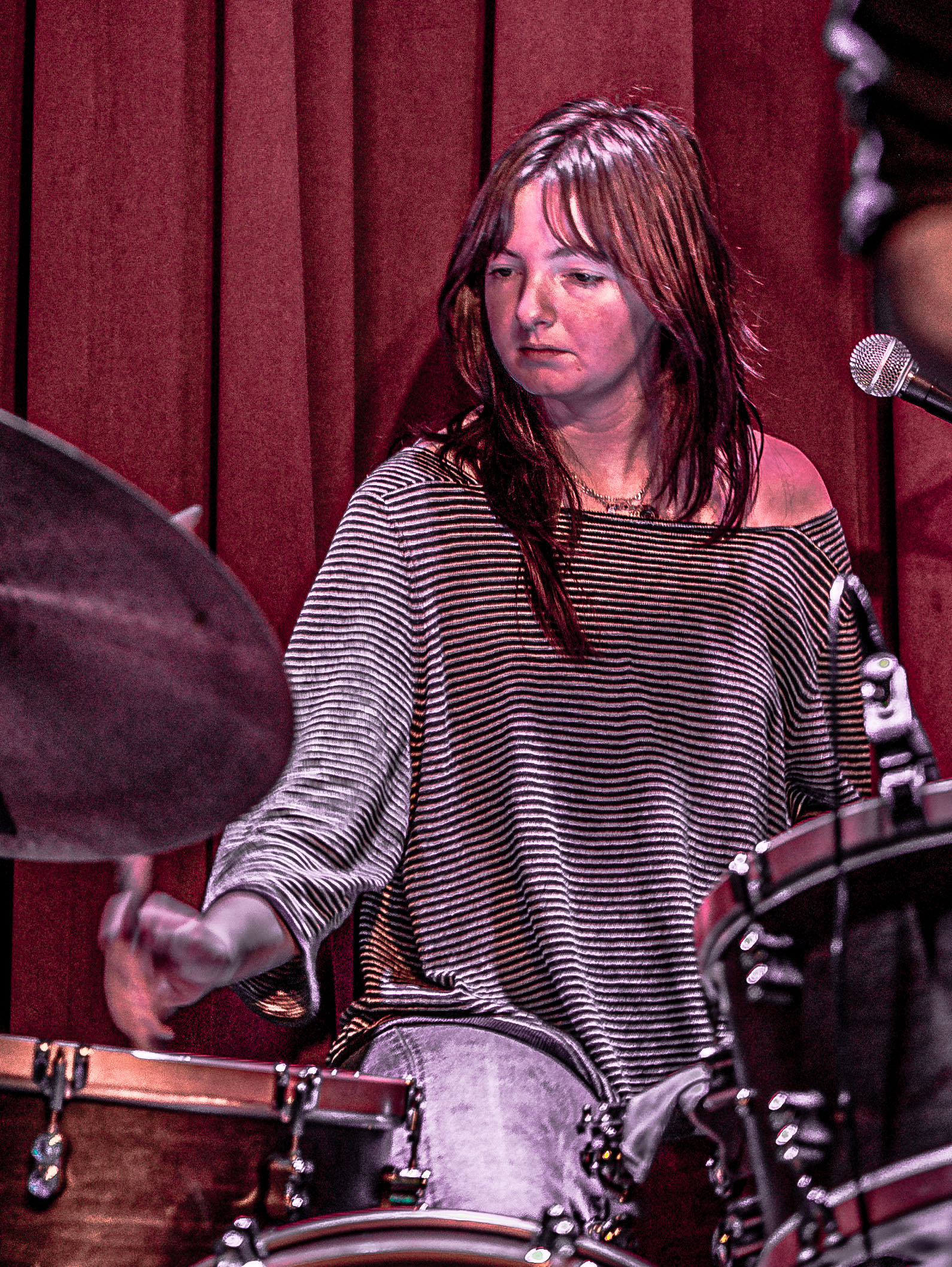

Background information
- Also known as: Kingfisher
- Origin: Ann Arbor, Michigan, US
- Genres: Indie; alternative folk; post-rock; art rock; chamber pop
- Years active: 2019–present
- Labels: R&R
- Members: Callum Roberts; Casey Cheatham; Connor Hoyt; Kaysen Chown; Sam DuBose; Samuel Uribe Botero; Tyler Thenstedt
- Past members: Ben Wood
- Website: racingmountpleasant.com

Racing Mount Pleasant (formerly Kingfisher) are an indie band from Ann Arbor, Michigan. After forming under the name Kingfisher at the University of Michigan, they released their debut album Grip Your Fist, I'm Heaven Bound in November 2022. In 2025, they changed their name to Racing Mount Pleasant and released a self-titled album. Their musical style has been compared to bands such as Bon Iver, Lord Huron, and Black Country, New Road.

== Career ==
Racing Mount Pleasant started as Kingfisher in 2019, after future band members Callum Roberts, Connor Hoyt, and Sam DuBose discussed forming a band within minutes of meeting each other. The band released their debut album Grip Your Fist, I'm Heaven Bound on November 11, 2022; The Michigan Daily described it as "outstanding" and "a remarkably mature album". At the time, the band was composed of eight musicians, as well as two visual artists and two photographers. All twelve members were students at the University of Michigan. By June 2023, the band had become a seven-piece, plus three visual artists.

On April 9, 2025, the band changed its name from Kingfisher to Racing Mount Pleasant. The inspiration for the name was a highway exit that read "Racine Mount Pleasant", referring to Racine, Wisconsin and Mount Pleasant, Wisconsin. On the same day as the name change, they also released the single "Call It Easy". On May 9, they released the self-titled single "Racing Mount Pleasant" – written before the band's name change – and announced their first album under their new name, to be released on the record label R&R. They released the single "Your New Place" on July 11, also announcing that the album would be self-titled and released on August 15.

Racing Mount Pleasant's second album, Racing Mount Pleasant, was released on August 15, 2025. It was recorded over the course of three years, in more than six different spaces and studios. The band stated that they had five more songs already written by the time the album was released, and that they aimed to write a movie soundtrack in the future.

In 2025, Racing Mount Pleasant opened a concert for Cameron Winter and opened for Geese for select shows on their Getting Killed tour.

On November 11, 2026, they released the single "Great Destroyer" and an accompanying music video.

== Musical style ==
Racing Mount Pleasant have been compared to many other artists, including Lord Huron, Bon Iver, Black Country, New Road, and Explosions in the Sky. Their musical style has been variously described as indie folk, chamber pop, Midwest emo, and garage rock. According to Arts Around Ann Arbor, their sound combines "the intimacy of folk music, the dynamics of shoegaze, the details of electronica, and the arrangements of jazz and classical crossovers."

Racing Mount Pleasant's live shows are often bespoke to each venue, using projectors synced to the music and sometimes telling the audience to sit instead of stand in order to "command attention in a way that [doesn't] ask for much". Their performances have been praised for their intimacy, immersion, and detail.

== Members ==
=== Current members ===
As of 8 June 2026.

- Samuel DuBose – vocals, guitar
- Callum Roberts – trumpet, guitar
- Connor Hoyt – alto saxophone
- Samuel Uribe Botero – tenor saxophone
- Kaysen Mortensen-Chown – strings, guitar
- Tyler Thenstedt – bass, vocals
- Casey Cheatham – drums, vocals

=== Past members ===
- Ben Wood - guitar

=== Visual artists ===
As of 28 June 2023.

- Gabby Mack
- Gray Snyder
- Sky Christoph

== Discography ==
=== Albums ===
==== As Kingfisher ====
- Grip Your Fist, I'm Heaven Bound (2022)

==== As Racing Mount Pleasant ====
- Racing Mount Pleasant (2025)

=== Singles ===
==== As Kingfisher ====
- "Snowing, all at once" (2022)
- "Regulate" (2022)
- "Holy Hell" (2022)
- "Do You Think I'm Pretty" (2022)

==== As Racing Mount Pleasant ====
- "Call It Easy" (2025)
- "Racing Mount Pleasant" (2025)
- "Your New Place" (2025)
- "Great Destroyer" (2026)
