= ~ (album) =

Studio album by iamthemorning
- Released: April 27, 2012
- Genre: Progressive rock, chamber pop
- Length: 50:43
- Label: self-released
- Producer: iamthemorning

Iamthemorning chronology
~ (2012)	Miscellany (2014)

~ is the first studio album by Russian progressive chamber band iamthemorning. It was self-released digitally on April 27, 2012. It was made available to download for free by the band who believed that "music has to be available for everyone"; the band only made profit from donations.

== Background ==
The album was self-produced by the band and released in April 2012. In an interview, vocalists Marjana Semkina discussed the techniques used to record the album stating "I won’t reveal the backstage stories too much…[because] a lot of people would be terrified if they knew how we recorded certain things" referring to the subpar conditions under which the album was recorded, maintaining that "at least I know that we did our best". On the title of the album, Semkina described the tilde as "a powerful symbol. It brings us certain associations but all of them are more or less neutral. It’s difficult to keep things clear of additional emotional coloring. We didn’t want people to have any feelings about our album before they got to listen to it. We wanted them to be objective. We wanted them to judge us by our music".

The album was remastered in October 2012 and rereleased as a physical CD.

== Track listing ==
All lyrics are written by Marjana Semkina; all music is composed by Gleb Kolyadin and Semkina.

No.	Title	Length
1.	"~ [intermission I]"	2:50
2.	"inside"	4:16
3.	"burn"	4:39
4.	"circles"	3:16
5.	"~ [intermission II]"	0:52
6.	"weather changing"	3:03
7.	"~ [intermission III]"	0:52
8.	"scotland"	3:55
9.	"touching II"	4:02
10.	"~ [intermission IV]"	0:45
11.	"monsters"	4:02
12.	"serenade"	2:30
13.	"~ [intermission V]"	1:00
14.	"would this be"	4:17
15.	"~ [intermission VI]"	1:49
16.	"i.b.too"	4:30
17.	"~ [intermission VII]"	1:07
18.	"afis"	2:58
Total length:		50:43

== Personnel ==
iamthemorning

- Gleb Kolyadin – grand piano, keyboards
- Marjana Semkina – vocals

Additional musicians

- Max Roudenko – bass guitar
- Eugene Abzalov – electric guitar, acoustic guitar
- Mikhail Istratov – drums, percussion
- Alina Shilova – cello
- Ilya Dyakov – violin
- Philipp Buin – viola
- Nikita Valamin – shaker, tapping

Production

- Nikita Valamin – engineering, mastering, mixing
