= Belighted =

Studio album by iamthemorning
- Released: 15 September 2014
- Recorded: Assault & Battery 2 studio, House of Composers, Alchemea College of Audio Engineering
- Genres: Progressive Rock, Chamber Pop
- Length: 55:29
- Label: Kscope
- Producer: iamthemorning

Iamthemorning chronology
Miscellany'' (2014)	Belighted (2014)	From the House of Arts (2015)

Professional ratings
Review scores
Source	Rating
TeamRock	(favorable)
DPRP	9/10 stars

Belighted is the second studio album by chamber progressive band iamthemorning, their first album released through Kscope. The album was released on 15 September 2014 and features drummer Gavin Harrison from Porcupine Tree.

== Track listing ==
All tracks are written by iamthemorning.

No.	Title	Length
1.	"Intermission IX"	1:20
2.	"The Howler"	3:57
3.	"To Human Misery"	4:18
4.	"Intermission X"	0:53
5.	"Romance"	3:01
6.	"The Simple Story"	3:30
7.	"Intermission XI"	1:21
8.	"5/4"	3:50
9.	"Crowded Corridors"	8:44
10.	"Gerda"	4:52
11.	"Os Lunatum"	4:31
12.	"Intermission XII"	2:43
13.	"K. O. S."	6:06
14.	"Reprise of Light/No Light"	5:16
15.	"Intermission XIII"	0:58
Total length:		55:29

== Personnel ==
iamthemorning

- Marjana Semkina – Vocals, backing vocals
- Gleb Kolyadin, Piano, keyboards

Additional musicians

- Gavin Harrison – Drums
- Max Roudenko – Bass
- Vlad Avy – Guitars
- Mark Knight – Guitars
- Andres Izmaylov – Harp
