= Miscellany (EP) =

EP by iamthemorning
- Released: 1 January 2014
- Recorded: Assault & Battery 2, Alchemea College of Audio Engineering, Interzvuk studio
- Genre: Progressive rock, Chamber pop
- Label: self-released
- Producer: iamthemorning

Iamthemorning chronology
~ (2012)	Miscellany (2014)	Belighted (2014)

Miscellany is an extended play by Russian progressive chamber band iamthemorning. It was self-released on 1 January 2014. The album was mixed by Marcel van Limbeek, Gianluca Capacchione and Mark Knight then mastered by Marcel van Limbeek at Reveal Sound in London.

== Reception ==
Emma Johnston of Team Rock gave a mixed review describing comparisons to Tori Amos as “blindingly inevitable” while calling Semkina’s voice “clear, thrilling [and] theatrical”.

Professional ratings
Review scores
Source	Rating
Team Rock	3/5 stars

== Track listing ==
All tracks are written by iamthemorning

No.	Title	Length
1.	"To Human Misery (Chamber Version)"	4:17
2.	"The Simple Story"	3:35
3.	"Intermission XII"	2:36
4.	"Scotland (Unplugged)"	3:44
5.	"The Simple Story (Unplugged)"	3:44
6.	"Touching (London Mixing)"	4:07
7.	"Intermission VIII"	1:05
Total length:		23:08

== Personnel ==
iamthemorning

- Gleb Kolyadin – grand piano, keyboards
- Marjana Semkina – vocals, backing vocals

Additional musicians

- Gavin Harrison — drums on “The Simple Story”
- Vlad Avy - guitars and sampled percussion on “The Simple Story”
- Max Roudenko — bass on “The Simple Story”

Production

- Marcel van Limbeek – engineering, mastering, mixing
- Gianluca Capacchione – engineering, mixing
- Drew Smith – engineering
- Anna Pavluk – engineering
- Mark Knight – engineering, mixing
- KJ Thorarinsson – engineering
- Nikita Valamin — engineering
- Constantine Nagishkin — artwork, cover design
- Max Roudenko — engineering

Strings Ensemble

"To Human Misery" and "The Simple Story" performed
by Turner Quartet:

- Robert Yeomans — first violin
- Ruth Funnell — second violin
- Holly Rouse — viola
- Rosie Banks-Francis — cello
- Gleb Kolyadin — strings arrangement for “The Simple Story
- Grigory Losenkov — strings arrangement for The Human Misery

Touching (London Mix):

- Ilya Dyakov — violin
- Philipp Buin — viola
- Alina Shilova — cello

Intermission VIII:

- Vsevolod Dolganov — cello
