= Sore (band) =

Indonesian indie rock band

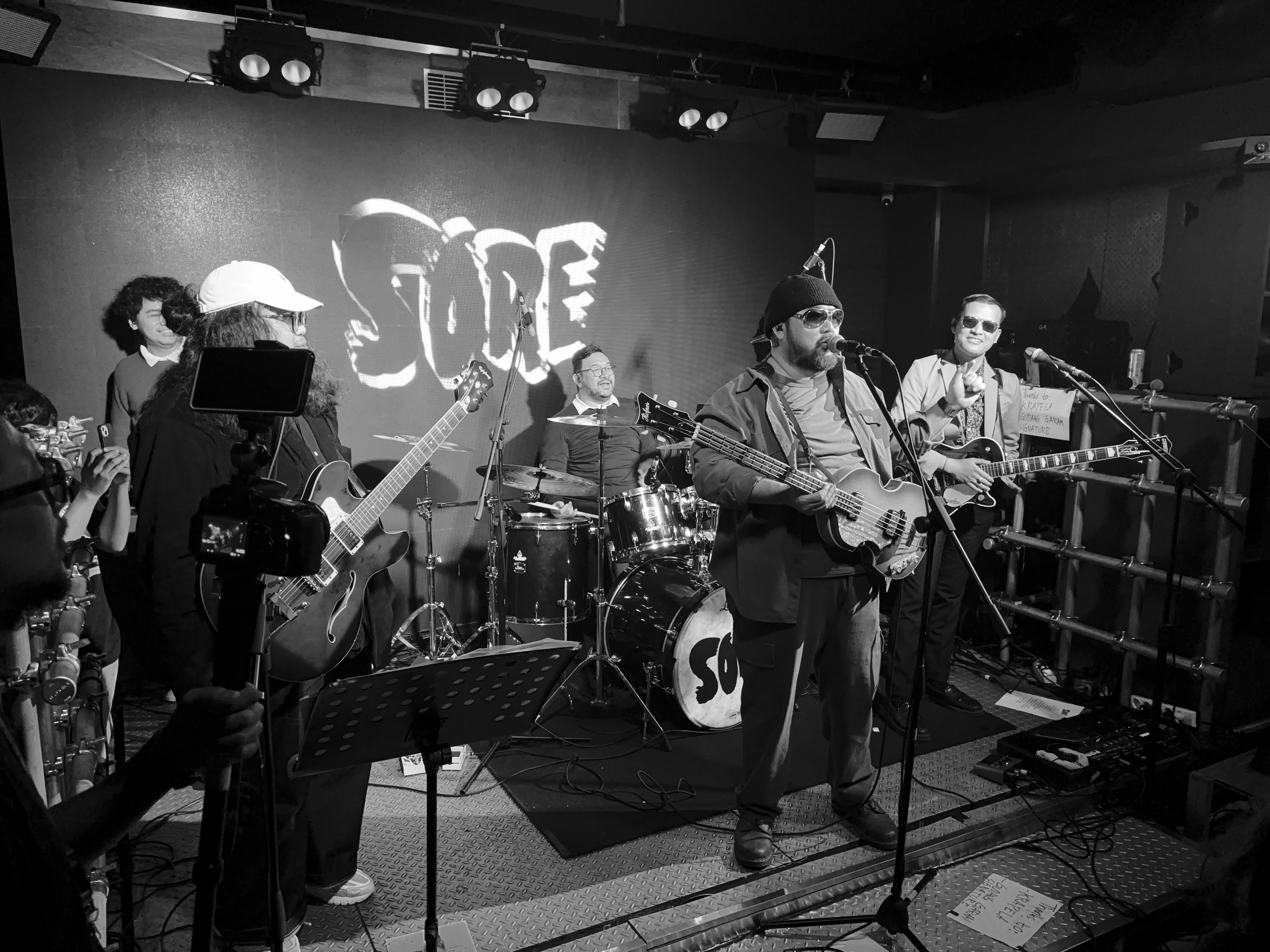
- Sore, 2024

Background information
- Origin: Jakarta, Indonesia
- Genres: Rock, indie, indie pop, psychedelic pop, progressive pop
- Years active: 2002–present
- Labels: Aksara Records, Rooftopsound Records, Setengah Lima Records
- Members: Awan Garnida; Bemby Gusti
- Past members: Mondo Gascaro; Dono Firman; Reza Dwiputranto; Ade Paloh

Sore (pronounced [sore], often stylized as SORE) is an Indonesian indie band formed in Jakarta in 2002. The band was originally formed by Ade Paloh, Mondo Gascaro and Awan Garnida. They have been close friends since childhood. Other two members, Bemby Gusti and Reza Dwiputranto, were brought in by Awan Garnida.

== History ==
=== 2004—2005: Early years and Centralismo debut album ===
In 2004 and early 2005, Sore contributed two songs in a couple of compilation albums. The first one was in a compilation album of Jakarta’s indie scene called JKRT: SKRG (an abbreviation of "Jakarta, Sekarang" which translates to "Jakarta, Now"). The album was released by Aksara Records. Another one was an original motion picture soundtrack of Janji Joni. The album was also released by Aksara Records.

SORE finally released their full-length debut album, Centralismo, in 2005. The album title itself refers to the word "central", which in this case refers to Central Jakarta, where the majority of band members grew up. The music varied greatly from track to track, as each member contributed lead singing and songwriting to this album. Their vintage instrumentation, like the use of vibraphones, mellotrons, and horn sections is reminiscent of popular music in the 1950s, 1960s, and 1970s.

The first album was praised by Time Magazine Asia as "One of Five Asian Albums Worth Buying", and Rolling Stone Indonesia magazine ranked it the 40th in "150 Greatest Indonesian Albums of All Time". The fifth single, "No Fruits for Today", also ranked as one of "150 Greatest Indonesian Songs of All Time".

=== 2005—2008: Ports of Lima ===
While preparing their materials for their second album, they contributed to four original soundtrack albums: Berbagi Suami (Love for Share); Kala (Dead Time); the Joko Anwar film Quickie Express; Perempuan Punya Cerita (Chants of Lotus), one of which became a hit single, "Pergi Tanpa Pesan", a reworking of an Indonesian classic from the late 1950s.

In April 2008, three years after releasing the debut album, SORE released their second album, Ports of Lima produced by the Aksara Records label. The album was also voted as "Best Album of 2008 in the #1st list rank number" by Rolling Stone Indonesia magazine.

=== 2012—2016: Gascaro's departure and Los Skut Leboys ===
Lead songwriter Ramondo Gascaro left the band in 2012, and Dono Firman left in 2013.

In 2015 they released Los Skut Leboys, a record that is predominantly indie rock, but contains some experimentalism as well. The album features a collaboration with Aimee Saras on Al Dusalima which harks back to the band's chamber pop roots, whilst the song R14 is dedicated to Ria Irawan, who was ill at the time.

=== 2023–present: Quo Vadis, SORE? and Paloh's death ===
On 10 February 2023, Sore released their first full release in eight years, Quo Vadis, SORE?.

Paloh died on 19 March 2024 due to illness. Despite Paloh's sudden death, the band agreed to continue playing, leaving Garnida and Gusti as remaining original members.

== Discography ==
=== Studio albums ===
- 2005: Centralismo
- 2008: Ports of Lima
- 2015: Los Skut Leboys
- 2023: Quo Vadis, SORE?

=== Live albums ===
- 2015: Live at IFI

=== EPs ===
- 2010: Sombreros Kiddos
- 2019: Mevrouw

=== Compilations ===
- 2013 : Sorealist

=== Singles ===
- 2004: "Cermin" - JKT:SKRG (Compilation)
- 2005: "Funk the Hole" - Janji Joni (Original Soundtrack)
- 2006: "Pergi Tanpa Pesan" - Berbagi Suami (Original Soundtrack)
- 2006: "No Fruits for Today" - Berbagi Suami (Original Soundtrack)
- 2007: "Hidup Itu Indah" - Mesin Waktu: Teman-Teman Menyanyikan Lagu Naif (Compilation)
- 2007: "Ada Musik Di Dalam" - Kala (Original Soundtrack)
- 2007: "Ernestito" - Quickie Express (Original Soundtrack)
- 2007: "Bebas" - Rolling Stone Rare and Raw Vol. 02 (Compilation)
- 2009: "Setengah Lima" - Groov3y i-ring (Compilation)
- 2009: "The Hitman" - Synchronize Session One (Compilation)
- 2009: "Nancy Bird" - Pintu Terlarang (Original Soundtrack)
- 2009: "Lullaby Blues" - Pintu Terlarang (Original Soundtrack)
- 2011: "Oh Jakarta" - Arisan! 2 (Original Soundtrack)
- 2012: "Bogor Biru" - Modus Anomali (Original Soundtrack)
- 2014: "Sssst..." - Urbanscapes 2013: This City’s Creative Arts Festival (A Sampling Of The Region’s Finest) (Compilation)
- 2025: "Sssst..." - Tinggal Meninggal (Original Soundtrack)
- 2025: "Setengah Lima" - Tinggal Meninggal (Original Soundtrack)
- 2026: "Surya Jelang Menepi"

== Personnel ==
=== Current members ===
- Awan Garnida - bass, vocals (2002–present)
- Bemby Gusti - drums, vocals (2002–present)

=== Touring members ===
- Gilang Pramudya - guitar, vocals (2018–present)
- Aufa Kantadiredja - keyboard, vocals (2022–present)
- Luthfi Zamzami - keyboard (2023–present)
- Marvin Muhammad - guitar, vocals (2024–present)

=== Former members ===
- Mondo Gascaro - keyboard, guitar, vocals (2002–2012; guest 2024)
- Reza Dwiputranto - guitar, vocals (2002–2019)
- Dono Firman - keyboard, guitar (2008–2012)
- Ade Paloh - guitar, vocals (2002–2024; his death)

== See also ==
- List of Indonesian rock bands
- List of Indonesian musicians
