= Centralismo (album) =

2005 studio album by Sore

Studio album by Sore
- Released: 15 July 2005
- Genre: Jazz fusion, chamber pop, lounge
- Length: 57:52
- Label: Aksara Records

Sore chronology
Centralismo (2005)	Ports of Lima (2008)

Professional ratings
Review scores
Source	Rating
AllMusic	4/5 stars
Time	Favorable

Centralismo is the debut album by Sore. The album is ranked on number No. 40 in Rolling Stone Indonesia: 150 Greatest Indonesian Albums of All Time.

== Track listing ==
All tracks are written by Ade Firza Paloh, except where noted.

No.	Title	Length
1.	"Bebas"	4:42
2.	"Mata Berdebu"	4:15
3.	"Somos Libres"	3:42
4.	"No Fruits for Today" (Firza Paloh, Ramondo Gascaro)	4:58
5.	"Cermin" (Reza Dwiputranto)	4:21
6.	"Keangkuhanku" (Dwiputranto)	4:58
7.	"Etalase" (Bemby Gusti Pramudya)	6:56
8.	"Ambang" (Firza Paloh, Gascaro)	5:20
9.	"Ada Musik di Dalam" (Firza Paloh, Dwiputranto, Gusti Pramudya, Awan Garnida, Gascaro)	4:40
10.	"Lihat" (Firza Paloh, Gusti Pramudya, Gascaro)	4:36
11.	"She's So Beautiful" (Lens TerWee of The Miskins)	5:12
12.	"Aku" (Dwiputranto)	4:15

== Personnel ==
- Ade Firza Paloh – Guitar, vocals, backing vocals
- Reza Dwiputranto – Bass, cymbals, acoustic guitar, electric guitar, hand clapping, percussion, vocals, backing vocals
- Awan Garnida – Bass, vocals, backing vocals
- Ramondo Gascaro – Bells, clavinet, clogs, acoustic guitar, electric guitar, hand clapping, mellotron, music box, organ, piano, shahnai, synthesizer, synthesizer vibes, vibraphone, vocals, backing vocals
- Bemby Gusti Pramudya – Drums, vocals, backing vocals
