= Ports of Lima (album) =

Studio album by Sore
- Released: April 24, 2008
- Recorded: Nov 2006 – Dec 2007
- Genre: Jazz fusion, chamber pop, lounge
- Length: 58:33
- Label: Aksara Records

Sore chronology
Centralismo (2005)	Ports of Lima (2008)	Los Skut Leboys (2015)

Professional ratings
Review scores
Source	Rating
Jakarta Post	5/5 stars
Junk Magazine	4/5 stars

Ports of Lima is Jakarta-based indie band Sore's second full-length album.

== Track listing ==
No.	Title	Length
1.	"Bogor Biru" (Ade Firza Paloh, Bemby Gusti Pramudya)	3:59
2.	"Senyum Dari Selatan" (Awan Garnida, Ramondo Gascaro)	3:51
3.	"Merintih Perih" (Reza Dwiputranto)	5:08
4.	"Essensimo" (Firza Paloh)	4:13
5.	"400 Elegi" (Gusti Pramudya)	4:05
6.	"Layu" (Reza Dwiputranto)	3:20
7.	"Setengah Lima" (Firza Paloh, Gusti Pramudya)	4:16
8.	"Ernestito" (Ramondo Gascaro)	4:53
9.	"Vrijeman" (Firza Paloh, Reza Dwiputranto)	6:10
10.	"Come by Sanjurou" (Firza Paloh)	4:38
11.	"In 1997 the Bullet Was Shy" (Ramondo Gascaro)	4:58
12.	"Apatis Ria" (Firza Paloh)	3:29
13.	"Karolina" (Gascaro, Firza Paloh)	5:34

== Line-Up ==
=== Band Member ===
- Ade Firza Paloh – Guitar, Vocals
- Awan Garnida – Bass, Vocals
- Ramondo Gascaro, – Keyboard, Vocals, Composer
- Reza Dwi Putranto – Guitar, Vocals
- Bemby Gusti Pramudya – Drums, Vocals
- Dono Firman – Synthesizer, Keyboard, Guitars

=== Credits ===
- Indra Aziz – Sax (Alto), Sax (Tenor), Soloist
- Reza Dwiputranto – Bass, Composer, Guitar (Acoustic), Guitar (Electric), Handclapping, Vocals, Vocals (Background)
- Awan Garnida – Bass, Vocals, Vocals (Background)
- Ario Hendrawan – Engineer, Arranger, Vocals (Background)
- Marty Paloh – Composer
- Andi Rianto – Piano
- David Tarigan – A&R
- Bemby Gusti – Bass, Bells, Bongos, Conga, Drums, Guitar (Acoustic), Guitar (Electric), Percussion, Piano, Rums, String Arrangements, Strings, Vibraphone, Vocals, Wood Block, Woodwind Arrangement
- Ramondo Gascaro – Artwork, Brass Arrangement, Choir Arrangement, Choir, Chorus, Drum Samples, Fender Rhodes, Flute, Guitar (Acoustic), Guitar (Electric), Guitar (Synthesizer), Handclapping, Harpsichord, Horn Arrangements, Mellotron, Organ, Organ (Hammond), Original Concept, Pianicca, Piano, Script, Shaker, String Arrangements, Strings, Synthesizer, Tambourine, Vibraphone, Vocals, Vocals (Background), Woodwind, Woodwind Arrangement.
