= Árstíðir =

Icelandic band

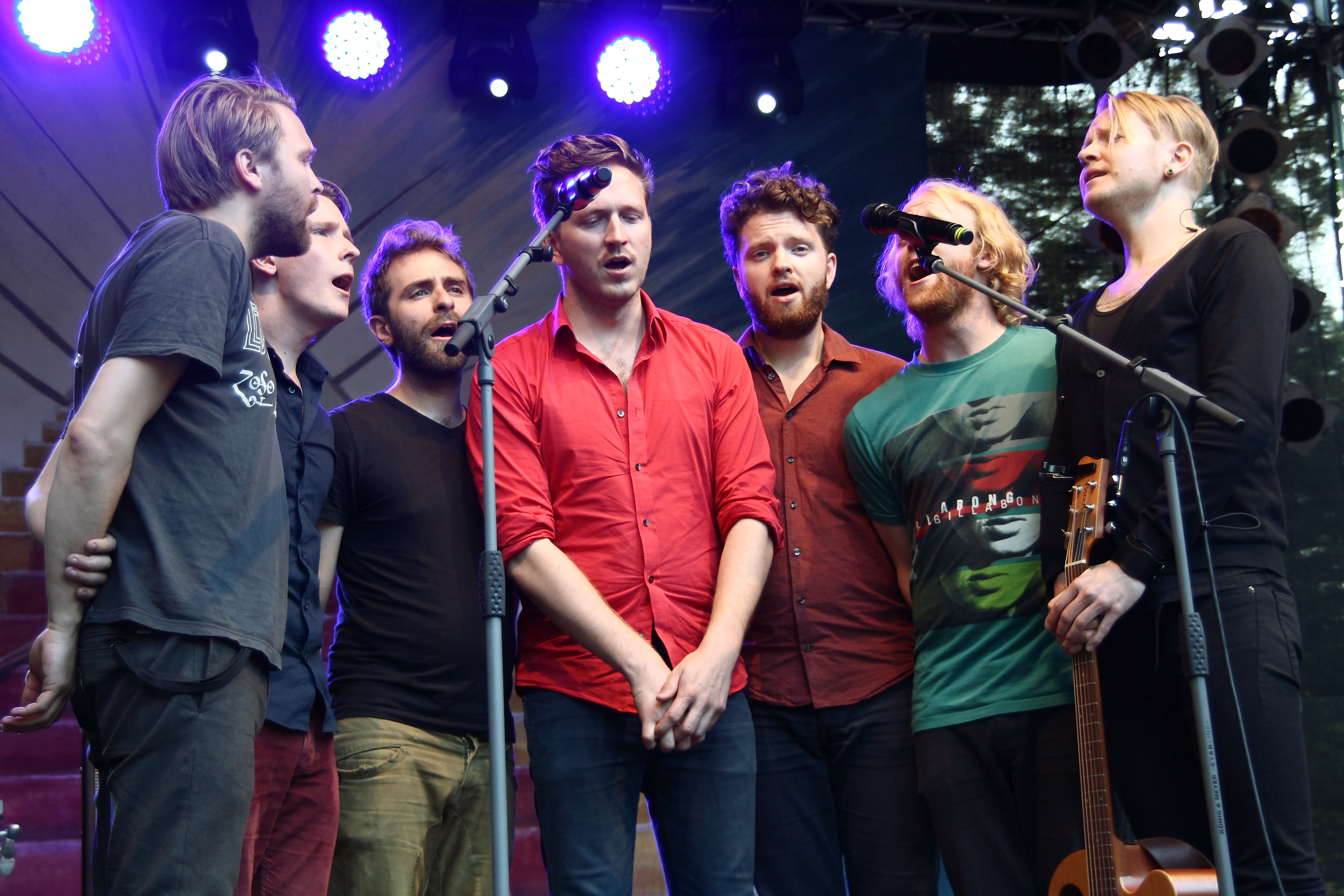
- Árstíðir at TFF Rudolstadt, 2013.

Background information
- Origin: Reykjavík, Iceland
- Genres: Indie; classical music; chamber pop
- Years active: 2008–present
- Labels: Nivalis; Beste Unterhaltung; Season of Mist
- Members: Gunnar Már Jakobsson; Ragnar Ólafsson; Daníel Auðunsson
- Past members: Karl James Pestka; Jón Elisson; Hallgrímur Jónas Jensson
- Website: arstidir.com

Árstíðir (English: Seasons) is an Icelandic classically influenced indie-folk rock/chamber pop band. The defining characteristic of this band is their vocal harmonies, as all members sing.

The band formed in 2008 in Reykjavík as a trio, consisting of Daníel Auðunsson (guitar), Gunnar Már Jakobsson (guitar) and Ragnar Ólafsson (baritone guitar). When they recorded their first album, Árstíðir, Jónas Jensson (cello) and Jón Elísson (piano) joined the band. In 2010, the band became a sextet with Karl James Pestka (violin). Jón Elísson and Hallgrímur Jónas Jensson left Árstíðir in late 2013, and Karl James Pestka in 2016.

Currently, Árstíðir is composed of members Gunnar Már Jakobsson (baritone guitar), Daníel Auðunsson (guitar) and Ragnar Ólafsson (piano). Since founding the band, they have released three albums: one live EP and two studio albums. Árstíðir have always been an independent band. In Iceland, they have their own record company, Nivalis, and in Germany they have a cooperation contract with Beste Unterhaltung. In 2014, they crowdfunded their third studio album, Hvel, via Kickstarter, which was released in March 2015.

== Discography ==
=== Studio ===
- 2009: Árstíðir (English: Seasons)
- 2011: Svefns og vöku skil (English: Sleep State Return)
- 2015: Hvel (English: Spheres)
- 2016: Verloren Verleden (English: Lost Past) in collaboration with Anneke van Giersbergen
- 2018: Nivalis (English: Snow)
- 2018: Garðurinn Minn in collaboration with Magnús Þór
- 2021: Pendúll (English: Pendulum)
- 2022: Blik (English: Look)
- 2024: Vetrarsól - Voices of the Winter Sun (a capella album)

=== Lives & EPs ===
- 2009: Live at Fríkirkjan (Free Church) (EP)
- 2012: Tvíeind (Remix EP)

== Viral Video ==
Árstíðir became known to a wider internet audience in 2013 when a YouTube video of an impromptu a capella performance of Heyr himna smiður, (English: Hear, Smith of Heavens), a 13th-century Icelandic hymn, at Vohwinkel train station in Wuppertal, Germany went viral after a performance there. The video was shot by their PR manager.

== Awards and nominations ==
Year	Nominee / work	Award	Result
2009	Album "Árstíðir"	#1 in Iceland Album Chart	Nominated
2012	Folkherbst in Plauen, Germany	Eiserner Eversteiner, Jury Award	Won
