= Where We Were Together =

Studio album by Say Sue Me
- Released: April 13, 2018
- Genre: Indie rock, jangle pop
- Length: 45:20
- Label: Damnably

Say Sue Me chronology
We've Sobered Up (2014)	Where We Were Together (2018)	The Last Thing Left (2022)

South Korean version cover
- South Korean version cover

Where We Were Together is the second studio album by South Korean indie rock band Say Sue Me. The album was released on 13 April 2018 through Damnably.

== Background ==
Following the release of his first album We've Sobered Up, Say Sue Me signed with the British label Damnably. They supported a tour of Otoboke Beaver. The band's drummer Kang Semin had to leave the band due to a serious injury, and new drummer Kim Changwon joined the band. After the new drummer joined, the band restarted recording their second album.

== Critical reception ==
Professional ratings
Aggregate scores
Source	Rating
Metacritic	80/100
Review scores
Source	Rating
AllMusic	4/5 stars
The Independent	4/5 stars
Paste	8.8/10
Pitchfork	6.8/10

Where We Were Together was well received by music critics. On review aggregator website, Metacritic, Where We Were Together received an average rating of 80 out of 100 based on five professional critic reviews, indicating "generally favorable reviews". Ben Salmon of Paste reviewed "Where We Were Together is the peak on an album packed with high points from a band poised for a serious breakthrough." Steven Arroyo of Pitchfork described the album as "It's a convincing demolition of the argument that Say Sue Me can't be anything other than gentle, and a persuasive case that they should be other things more often."

Publication	List	Rank	Ref.
AllMusic	Favorite indie pop and indie rock albums of 2018	N/A	
Music Y	The Best Albums of 2018	4	

== Track listing ==
No.	Title	Length
1.	"Let It Begin"	5:37
2.	"But I Like You"	4:11
3.	"Old Town"	3:53
4.	"Ours"	3:40
5.	"Funny and Cute"	3:37
6.	"I Just Wanna Dance"	2:12
7.	"B Lover"	2:54
8.	"After Falling Asleep"	3:49
9.	"Here"	4:11
10.	"About the Courage to Become Somebody's Past"	3:40
11.	"Coming to the End"	7:36
Total length:		45:20
