= We've Sobered Up =

Studio album by Say Sue Me
- Released: October 2, 2014
- Genre: Indie rock
- Length: 37:06
- Label: Electric Muse, Damnably

Say Sue Me chronology
We've Sobered Up (2014)	Where We Were Together (2018)

We've Sobered Up is the debut studio album by South Korean indie rock band Say Sue Me. The album was released on 2 October 2014 through Damnably. In 2017, Damnably released a compilation album Say Sue Me, which added a few singles to this album.

== Background ==
Say Sue Me was formed in 2012, and the album was recorded at their studio near Gwangalli Beach. They explained about the album, "Everyone really loved American indie new music in the '90s, so we added surf music on top of that." Web magazine Indiepost described the album as "The album with a proper mix of 60s surf music and 90s American indie rock."

== Track listing ==
No.	Title	Length
1.	"To Be Wise"	3:42
2.	"I Know I'm Kind of Boring"	2:50
3.	"Say Sue Me"	3:50
4.	"One Week"	3:18
5.	"Crying Episode"	4:04
6.	"Bad Feeling"	3:49
7.	"What I Have to Do"	3:04
8.	"Let's Don't Say Anything"	2:48
9.	"Sorry that I'm Drunk"	2:55
10.	"Long Night and Crying"	3:13
11.	"The Night of Gwanlli"	3:33
Total length:		37:06
