= Former Utopia =

English rock band

- Origin: London, England, UK
- Genre: Rock
- Years active: 2006–present
- Label: Damnably
- Members: George Gargan; Rama; Russ Evans

Former Utopia is a rock band from London, England. They formed after meeting at a Silver Jews gig in 2006. The band toured the UK with Julie Doiron in 2009 and with smallgang 2011 and Europe with Shonen Knife in 2012. They have also shared stages with Bottomless Pit, Uzeda, COME, Bellini, Thee More Shallows, Chris Brokaw, Geoff Farina, Shannon Wright, David Grubbs and PW Long.

The band's Collapsar EP was self-recorded at Karma Studios in a day at Stoke Newington in 2012, and mixed and mastered by Matthew Barnhart at Echolab Studios in Denton. Released on Damnably in 2013, tracks from the EP received BBC Radio 6 Music airplay from Gideon Coe, and Tom Ravenscroft.

In 2013, the band were selected to play at Incubate Festival in Tilburg.

== Band members ==
- George Gargan(guitar)
- Rama (Drums)
- Russ Evans(Bass)

George Gargan was formerly a member of the band Lazarus Clamp from 1999-2003 and played bass and sang on the albums The More We are The Funnier It Is (2004) and It Ain't What You Do It's What it Does to You (2008).

== Discography ==
- Tiptoe Through The Tulips - 2009, Damnably
- Collapsar - 2013, Damnably
- Magnetar - 2020, Damnably
