= Itekoma Hits =

Studio album by Otoboke Beaver
- Released: 26 April 2019
- Genre: Hardcore punk • noise rock • alternative rock
- Length: 26:26
- Label: Damnably

Otoboke Beaver chronology
Okoshiyasu!! Otoboke Beaver (2018)	Itekoma Hits (2019)	Super Champon (2022)

Itekoma Hits is an album by the Japanese punk rock band Otoboke Beaver, released by Damnably on 26 April 2019. The album features newly-recorded songs alongside tracks from the previously released EPs Bakuro Book (2016) and Love Is Short!! (2017). The album's release was preceded by the single "Anata Watashi Daita Ato Yome no Meshi" which is also included on the album.

== Reception ==
Professional ratings
Review scores
Source	Rating
AllMusic	4/5 stars
Pitchfork	7.7/10
PopMatters	7/10

Itekoma Hits received generally positive reviews from critics. AllMusic critic Heather Phares praised the band "for making their pummeling attacks sound both furious and gleefully liberated" and noted that the newly-recorded tracks "add more detail and sophistication" to the band's sound. Phares concluded that the album "doesn't leave listeners a moment to catch their breath -- or grow bored." In the words of PunkNews, "The four women who make up Otoboke Beaver are so unbelievably talented and insane and frenetic that the twenty-seven or so minutes that make up this album grab you immediately and never let you go."

Vrinda Jagota of Pitchfork described the album as "a tornado of defiance" and "fueled by a rage so ferocious it's thrilling to behold." Chris Conaton of PopMatters criticized the construction of some of the songs, but concluded that "Even when they're angry, these women are clearly having a great time, and that enthusiasm makes for an infectious listening experience." In a review for The Wire, Neil Kulkarni praised the "fantastically thoughtful songwriting" of the album.

== Track listing ==
Notes: (‡) indicates songs previously released on the EPs Bakuro Book (2016) and Love Is Short!! (2017).

(‡‡) indicates re-recorded songs: "Akimahenka" (originally from 2015) and "Anata Watashi Daita Ato Yome no Meshi" (originally from 2018) are new recordings of previously released songs with Kahokiss replacing Pop on drums.

All tracks are written by Accorinrin.

No.	Title	Length
1.	"Datsu, Hikage no Onna"	2:04
2.	"Akimahenka" (2019 version ‡‡)	1:13
3.	"S'il vous Plait" (‡)	2:15
4.	"Bakuro Book" (‡)	2:21
5.	"What Do You Mean You Have to Talk to Me at This Late Date?" (‡)	1:54
6.	"Introduce Me to Your Family" (‡)	2:28
7.	"Love Is Short!!" (‡)	2:11
8.	"Bad Luck"	2:06
9.	"Don't Light My Fire"	2:16
10.	"6 Day Working Week Is a Pain"	2:47
11.	"Binge Eating Binge Drinking Bulimia"	0:53
12.	"I'm Tired of Your Repeating Story"	1:43
13.	"Anata Watashi Daita Ato Yome no Meshi" (2019 version ‡‡)	1:57
14.	"Ikezu (Mean)" (‡)	0:18
Total length:		26:26

== Personnel ==
- Accorinrin – lead vocals, occasional rhythm guitar
- Yoyoyoshie – guitar, backing vocals
- Hirochan – bass, backing vocals
- Kahokiss – drums, backing vocals
- Pop – drums, backing vocals (‡)
