= The Last Thing Left =

Studio album by Say Sue Me
- Released: May 13, 2022
- Genre: Indie rock, jangle pop
- Length: 39:02
- Label: Damnably

Say Sue Me chronology
Where We Were Together (2018)	The Last Thing Left (2022)

The Last Thing Left is the third studio album by South Korean indie rock band Say Sue Me. The album was released on 13 May 2022 through Damnably.

== Background ==
Say Sue Me's second album Where We Were Together in 2018 had a successful result, but drummer Kang Semin died in 2019 while Kim Changwon and Ha Jaeyoung left the band for their own music careers. In 2020, the COVID-19 pandemic restricted their tours, and Lim Seongwan said the forced break left the band members lethargic. Explaining the album's title, vocalist Choi Soomi said "We were going to put aside the bad feelings that the band had all these years. We eventually thought about what's the last thing left, and that's love."

== Critical reception ==
Professional ratings
Aggregate scores
Source	Rating
Metacritic	80/100
Review scores
Source	Rating
AllMusic	4.5/5 stars
IZM	3.5/5 stars
Pitchfork	7.3/10
PopMatters	8/10
Sputnikmusic	3.8/5

The Last Thing Left was well received by music critics. On review aggregator website, Metacritic, The Last Thing Left received an average rating of 80 out of 100 based on four professional critic reviews, indicating "generally favorable reviews". Tim Sendra of AllMusic reviewed "That they manage to convey those feelings to the listener in such a pleasantly sweet fashion is a credit to them as a group and the album takes them from just another (albeit really good) chirpy indie pop band to one ready for the big leagues, sonically and emotionally." Joanna McNaney Stein of PopMatters said "Whether Say Sue Me are surf-rock, shoegaze, or dream-pop, none of these categories seem to matter when listening to the delightful The Last Thing Left."

== Track listing ==
The Last Thing Left track listing
No.	Title	Length
1.	"The Memory of the Time" (그 때의 기억)	4:11
2.	"Still Here" (featuring Kim Il Du)	4:09
3.	"Around You"	3:42
4.	"We Look Alike"	3:15
5.	"No Real Place"	2:51
6.	"To Dream" (꿈에; featuring Kim Oki)	4:32
7.	"Photo of You"	5:09
8.	"The Last Thing Left"	3:47
9.	"Now I Say"	4:23
10.	"George & Janice"	3:03
Total length:		39:02
