= Hazy Sour Cherry =

Modern Japanese indie-rock band

- Origin: Tokyo, Japan
- Genres: Indie rock
- Years active: 2018-present
- Label: Damnably
- Members: Tsuzumi: Jun; Karin; Chiba
- Past members: Professor Poppo
- Website: https://hazysourcherry.com/

Hazy Sour Cherry is a four-piece indie rock band from Tokyo, Japan. The band members were prominent in the Tokyo indie music scene before, being members of other various bands before forming the indie supergroup Hazy Sour Cherry in 2018. Their current line-up consists of Tsuzumi (vocals), Jun (guitar), Karin (drums) and Chiba (bass).

== Biography ==
Hazy Sour Cherry formed in 2018 with founding members Tsuzumi (of OCHA∞ME), Jun (of HATEMAN, Gorilla) and Karin (of The Highmarts) with their original bassist, Poppo Professor, joining later. Members met in underground music scene, the Shimokitazawa area of Tokyo.

Tsuzumi came up with their name, inspired by types of craft beer that they love, though Jun originally wanted to name them "Teenage FBI".

Hazy Sour Cherry signed with Damnably records and released their debut album in 2019, Tour De Tokyo.

In 2020, the band released two singles, No Fun and Hot Summer Night. Their bassist, Poppo, went on sabbatical in late 2020.

The band were featured as part of record label Damnably's online showcase for SXSW 2021. They also played the online festival Wales Goes Pop of the same year. Hazy Sour Cherry have been playing socially distanced shows across Japan since, with their support bassist Chiba (of M.A.Z.E.) now becoming a permanent fixture of the band.

They released a Christmas EP, Bell of the Beginning at the end of 2021. They have finished recording a new album, with plans to release later in 2022.

== Musical Styles and Influences ==
Their music has been described as ranging from "danceable Indie-pop with elements of Johnny Marr style guitar skills to fun doo-wop and more sombre ballads". Band members say they are fans of BMX Bandits, Young Fresh Fellows, Go-Kart Mozart, Beatles, Rolling Stones, Japan bands Raspberries and Firestarter, as well as label mates Say Sue Me.

== Members ==
Current

- Tsuzumi (vocals)
- Jun (guitar)
- Karin (drums)
- Chiba (bass)

Former

- Professor Poppo (bass)

== Discography ==
=== Studio albums ===
Title	Album details
Tour De Tokyo	Released: 22 November 2019; Label: Damnably; Format: LP, CD, digital download
