= Super Champon =

Studio album by Otoboke Beaver
- Released: 6 May 2022
- Studio: LM Studio, Osaka
- Genre: Punk rock, garage punk
- Length: 21:17
- Label: Damnably
- Producer: Otoboke Beaver, Ippei Suda

Otoboke Beaver chronology
Itekoma Hits (2019)	Super Champon (2022)

Singles from Super Champon
- 1. "I Am Not Maternal" Released: February 6, 2022; 2. "Dirty Old Fart Is Waiting for My Reaction" Released: February 13, 2022

Super Champon is an album by the Japanese punk rock band Otoboke Beaver, released by Damnably on 6 May 2022. It is the band's first full studio album featuring all new songs, rather than fully or partially compiling songs from previously released EPs and rarities.

== Background ==
The album was preceded by the singles "Dirty Old Fart Is Waiting for My Reaction" and "I Am Not Maternal". According to the band, the word Champon in the album's title refers to their mixing of genres, while the word "is a Japanese noun meaning a mixture or jumble of things of different types... It also sounds like Champion." The song "I Put My Love to You in a Song JASRAC" is a reference to the Japanese Society for Rights of Authors, Composers and Publishers.

The songs "I Am Not Maternal" and "I Won't Dish Out Salads" are both commentaries on the social demands placed on Japanese women. The song "Don't Call Me Mojo" is an ode to a Japanese TV show about undesirable women. Guitarist Yoyoyoshie, who is also an artist and animator, created the cartoon videos for the songs "I Am Not Maternal" and "I Don't Want to Die Alone".

== Reception ==
Professional ratings
Review scores
Source	Rating
Narc	4.5/5
Pitchfork	7.8/10

Super Champon received generally positive reviews from critics. Pitchfork described the album as "fiercer" than its predecessor Itekoma Hits, and called it "a tart smattering of face-scrunching, neon candy." Reviewer Madison Bloom continued, "for them, every social nicety is teetering on a ledge, looking down into mayhem. Super Champon is the sound of Otoboke Beaver shoving them over, one by one." Narc magazine noted the album's "blistering guitars and drums, wildly rampageous lyrics and masterful musicianship that bobs and weaves like a flyweight on speed." According to a reviewer for Everything Is Noise, the band has "harnessed even more entropy than before to bounce off the walls in even more impressive and captivating ways, all while being more concise than ever and without losing the breadth of their music."

== Track listing ==
All tracks are written by Accorinrin.

No.	Title	Length
1.	"I Am Not Maternal"	2:05
2.	"Yakitori"	1:44
3.	"I Won't Dish Out Salads"	1:22
4.	"Pardon?"	1:45
5.	"Nabe Party with Pocket Brothers"	1:13
6.	"Leave Me Alone! No, Stay with Me!"	1:42
7.	"I Checked Your Cellphone"	1:32
8.	"I Put My Love to You in a Song JASRAC"	1:12
9.	"Don't Call Me Mojo"	1:39
10.	"Where Did You Buy Such a Nice Watch You Are Wearing Now"	0:26
11.	"George & Janice"	0:42
12.	"First-Class Side-Guy"	2:09
13.	"You’re No Hero Shut Up Fuck You Man-Whore"	0:16
14.	"I Don't Want to Die Alone"	1:55
15.	"Dirty Old Fart Is Waiting for My Reaction"	0:59
16.	"Do You Want Me to Send a DM"	0:12
17.	"Do You Want Me to Send a DM Part 2"	0:13
18.	"Let's Shopping After Show"	0:17
Total length:		21:17

== Personnel ==
- Accorinrin – lead vocals
- Yoyoyoshie – guitar, backing vocals
- Hirochan – bass, backing vocals
- Kahokiss – drums, backing vocals

== Charts ==
Chart performance for Super Champon
Chart (2022)	Peak position
UK Album Downloads (OCC)	77
