= Grrrl Gang =

Indonesian indie pop band

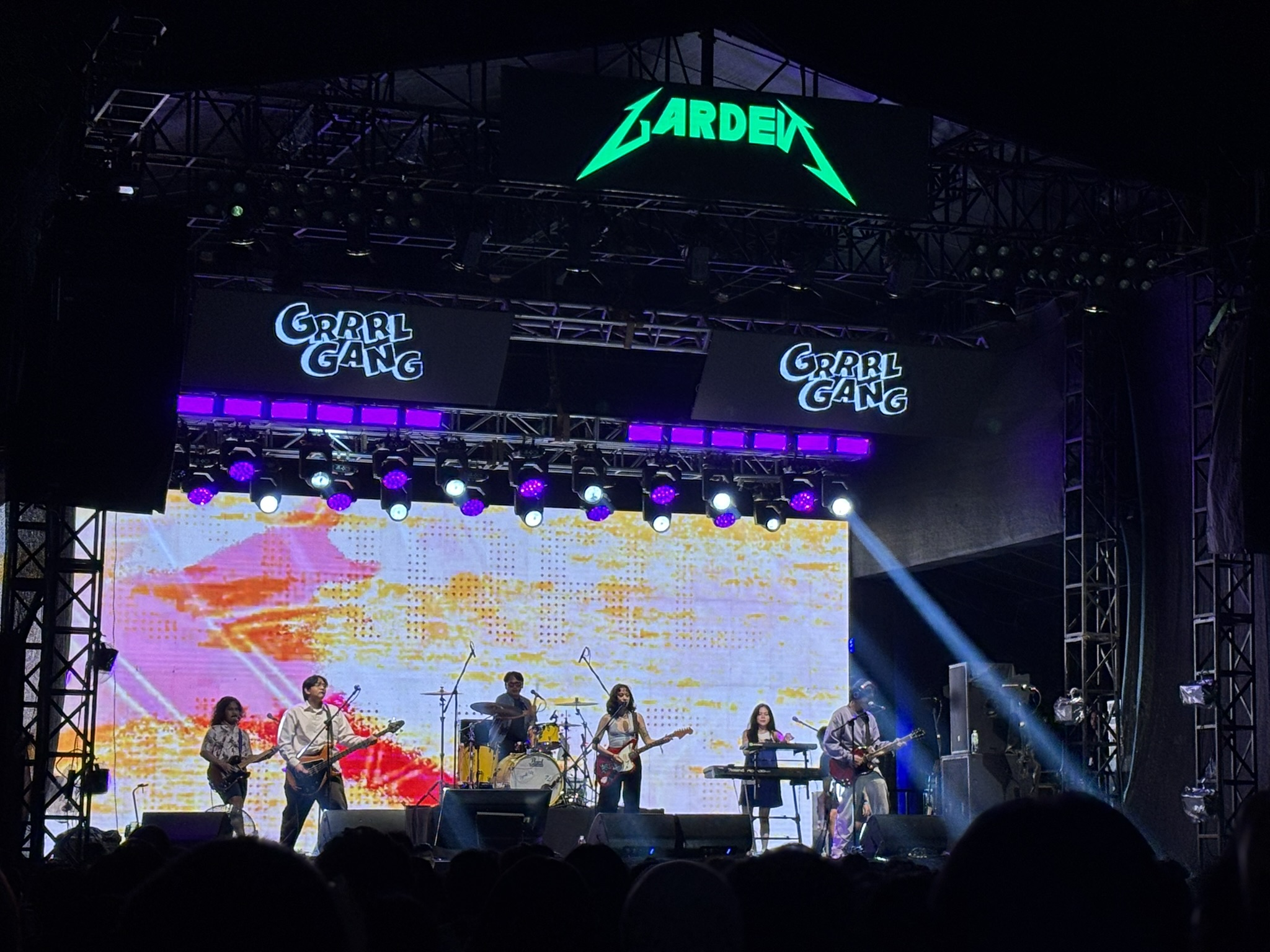

Background information
- Origin: Yogyakarta, Indonesia
- Genres: Indie pop; riot grrrl
- Years active: 2016–present
- Labels: Green Island; Trapped Animal; Big Romantic; Kill Rock Stars; Kolibri; Damnably
- Members: Angeeta Sentana; Edo Alventa; Akbar Rumandung

Grrrl Gang is an Indonesian indie pop band from Yogyakarta, Indonesia, consisting of vocalist/guitarist Angeeta Sentana, bassist/vocalist Akbar Rumandung, and guitarist/vocalist Edo Alventa.

== History ==
=== 2016–2018: Formation, Stop This Madness, and Not Sad, Not Fulfilled ===
The group was formed by Sentana and Rumandung during their studies at the Gadjah Mada University in 2016. Shortly after, Rumandung invited Alventa to join the band. They started their musical career with debut maxi single titled Stop This Madness, consisting of two singles "Bathroom" and "Thrills" on 9 March 2017 under independent record label Kolibri Records.

In 2018, they released an extended play, titled Not Sad, Not Fulfilled. After the release, they embarked on a Southeast Asian concert tour, including dates at the Esplanade Outdoor Theatre in Singapore and a homecoming date at the Jogja National Museum in Yogyakarta.

=== 2019–2022: International recognition and Here To Stay! ===
In September 2019, the group announced a hiatus to allow Alventa to focus on his day job, while Sentana and Rumandung pursued further studies. However, a month later, the group announced that they had signed a recording contract with London-based independent record label Damnably, in addition to confirming their performance at the South by Southwest music festival in 2020. Under the label, Grrrl Gang released their compilation album, Here To Stay! on 14 February 2020. Influential music critic Robert Christgau gave the album an "A−" rating and praised its lyrical contents.

Due to the COVID-19 pandemic, Grrrl Gang was forced to cancel their performance at SXSW. They eventually performed in the festival, which was held virtually a year later. In 2021, they released a single titled "Honey, Baby", along with an extended play that included four covers and remixes by fellow Indonesian musicians. The single was nominated for the Best Asian Song category at the NME Awards 2022.

In 2022, Grrrl Gang was recognized as one of the NME 100, a list of emerging artists created by British website NME.

=== 2023–present: Spunky! ===
Grrrl Gang relocated to the capital city of Jakarta and began recording their debut studio album with record producer Lafa Pratomo. On 30 May 2023, the group announced their debut studio album, Spunky! and released its title track as its lead single. They released singles "Rude Awakening" in June 2023, "Blue-Stained Lips" in July, and "Better Than Life" in August from then-upcoming studio album, Spunky!.

After the album release, Grrrl Gang embarked on a concert tour throughout Asia and Australia in October and November 2023, including performances at the inaugural edition of SXSW Sydney.

NME ranked the album at number 48 on their list of the 50 best albums of 2023, describing it as "an instant ticket to the sort of basement show where sweat rolls down the walls".

== Discography ==
=== Studio albums ===
List of studio albums
Title	Album details
Spunky!	Released: 22 September 2023; Label: Green Island, Trapped Animal, Big Romantic, Kill Rock Stars; Format: CD, LP, digital download

=== Compilation albums ===
List of compilation albums
Title	Album details
Here To Stay!	Released: 14 February 2020; Label: Damnably; Format: LP, digital download

=== Extended plays ===
List of extended plays
Title	Album details
Not Sad, Not Fulfilled	Released: 9 October 2018; Label: Kolibri; Format: CD, digital download
Honey, Baby	Released: 9 April 2021; Label: Kolibri; Format: CD, digital download

=== Singles ===
List of singles, showing year released and album name
Title	Year	Album
"Bathroom" / "Thrills"	2017	Stop This Madness
"Just a Game"	2018	Here To Stay!
"Dream Grrrl"	2018	Not Sad, Not Fulfilled
"Pop Princess"	2018	Not Sad, Not Fulfilled
"Honey, Baby"	2021	Non-album single
"Spunky!"	2023	Spunky!
"Rude Awakening"	2023	Spunky!
"Blue-Stained Lips"	2023	Spunky!
"Better Than Life"	2023	Spunky!
"Cool Girl"	2023	Spunky!

== Awards and nominations ==
Year	Association	Category	Nominated work	Result	Ref.
2022	NME Awards	Best Asian Song	"Honey, Baby"	Nominated	
2024	Anugerah Musik Indonesia	Best Alternative Duo/Group/Vocal Group/Collaboration	"Blue-Stained Lips"	Nominated	
2024	Anugerah Musik Indonesia	Best Alternative Music Album	Spunky!	Nominated	
