= Lazarus Clamp =

- Origin: Leicester, England
- Genres: Punk
- Years active: 1994–present
- Labels: Bearos Records, Sorted, Words and Works Records
- Website: http://www.lazarusclamp.co.uk

Lazarus Clamp are an English band punk rock band, formed in Leicester in 1994, known for keeping a low profile and for its humorous live performances.

== History ==
The band's debut single "Sea Sore Songs" was released on Amberley/Cleverlegs. The band had other early releases on Bearos Records and Sorted, both Midlands-based. The band had a good relationship with the now-defunct Guildford label, Words, and Works Rejected.

Their subsequent singles ("North", "Left-handed", "Some Rivals") and the band's first two LPs (Such as you are and still not seeming to mind and The more we are the funnier it is) show a wider range of influences. In early 2008, they released a double album, Death to Technicians / It ain't what you do it's what it does to you, described by Drowned in Sound as "wonkily elaborate". In late 2009, they released the Against entitlement LP. This received positive reviews from sources including The Sunday Times and Delusions of Adequacy.

== Discography ==
=== Singles ===
- "Sea Sore Songs" - 1999 (Amberley/ Cleverlegs)
- "North" - split 7-inch (Jonathan Whiskey)
- "Left-handed" - (Bearos Records)
- "Some Rivals" - split 7-inch (Sorted)
- "Don't Fence Me In" - split 7-inch (Damnably)

=== LPs ===
- Such as you are and still not seeming to mind. LP (2001, Words and works rejected/ Cleverlegs)
- The more we are the funnier it is. CD (2004, Words and works rejected/ Cleverlegs)
- Death to technicians. CD (2008, Bearos/ Cleverlegs)
- It ain't what you do its what it does to you. Additional CD album included with initial run of 'Death to Technicians.' (2008, Bearos/ Cleverlegs)
- Against entitlement. LP/CD. (2009, Little Red Rabbit/ Cleverlegs)
- The bird is not the metaphor. LP/CD. (2015, Damnably)
