= Say Sue Me =

South Korean indie rock band

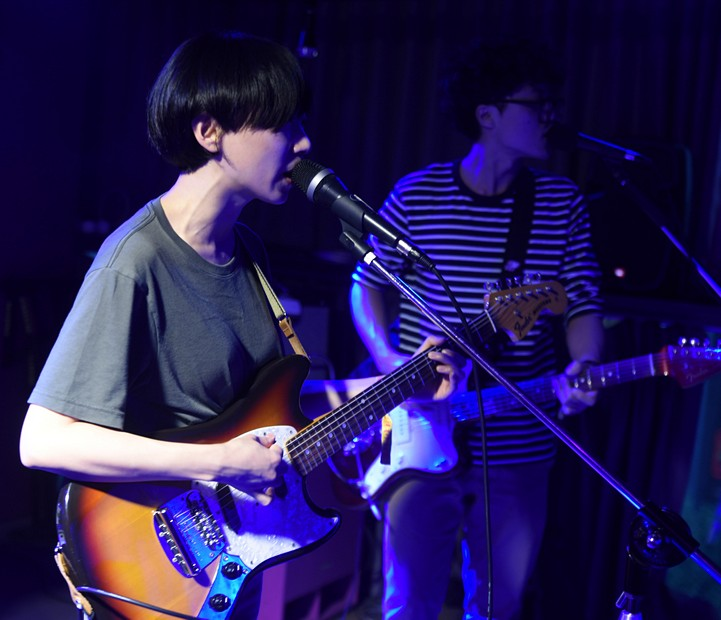
- Choi Su-mi of Say Sue Me in 2017

Background information
- Origin: Busan, South Korea
- Genres: Indie rock, surf rock
- Years active: 2012–present
- Labels: Electric Muse (South Korea); Damnably (UK); Tugboat (Japan)
- Members: Sumi Choi; Byungkyu Kim; Sungwan Lim; Jaeyoung Kim
- Past members: Jaeyoung Ha; Semin Kang; Changwon Kim
- Website: https://www.saysueme.com/

Say Sue Me (Korean: 세이수미) is an indie rock band from Busan, South Korea, currently consisting of members Sumi Choi, Byungkyu Kim, Sungwan Lim, and Jaeyoung Kim.

The group formed in 2012 and has released three full-length albums: We've Sobered Up (2014), Where We Were Together (2018) and The Last Thing Left (2022); and four extended plays: Big Summer Night (2015), Semin (2017), It's Just a Short Walk! (2018), and Christmas, It's Not a Biggie (2018).

Say Sue Me won Best Modern Rock Album and Best Modern Rock Song at the 2019 Korean Music Awards.

== Biography ==
Childhood friends Byungkyu (guitar), Jaeyoung Ha (bass), and Semin (drums) met Sumi (vocals) at a tea shop in the Nampo-dong neighborhood of Busan in 2012. The three liked Sumi's speaking voice and immediately offered her a spot as the vocalist in their new band that would become Say Sue Me.

Say Sue Me released their debut album, We've Sobered Up, in 2014, followed by their first EP, Big Summer Night, in 2015. The albums reached No. 64 and No. 79, respectively, on South Korea's Gaon Album Chart.

In 2016, drummer Semin fell into a semi-comatose state after rupturing his skull. Say Sue Me fans, as well as other indie bands from Busan, raised over 13 million won in one day to help pay for his medical bills.

The band brought on new drummer Changwon to temporarily replace Semin and named their 2017 EP, the Record Store Day release, Semin, after the injured drummer. That year, the band also released a self-titled compilation album on UK record label Damnably. The band played in London, UK that year in May, supporting label mates Otoboke Beaver at the renowned 100 Club. They also released a joint single, shared with their tour mates Otoboke Beaver, later that year, featuring song "Good For Some Reason" which was their first song together with new drummer Changwon.

In 2018, Say Sue Me release their second album, Where We Were Together, followed a week later by the Record Store Day EP, It's Just a Short Walk!, which includes covers of songs by Blondie, the Ramones, the Velvet Underground, and the Beach Boys. That year, the band performed at SXSW, marking their first performance in the United States, and toured the UK and Europe. During the tour, the band fell victim to a tire-slashing scam in Milan, losing a number of personal belongings, musical equipment and income from the tour. They started a fundraiser to help support them and future tours, releasing a 7" single with new songs "George & Janice" and "Don't Follow Our Van" as rewards for the fundraiser. At the end of the year, the band released the holiday EP, Christmas, It's Not a Biggie.

Say Sue Me were nominated for five awards at the 16th Korean Music Awards, including Artist of the Year, Song of the Year, and Album of the Year, making them the second most nominated act of the year, behind K-pop stars BTS. At the February 2019 awards ceremony, the band won Best Modern Rock Album for Where We Were Together and Best Modern Rock Song for "Old Town". The next month, the band performed again at SXSW and afterwards toured the UK again, following the release of a new single about humanity's disregard for the environment, "At the End of the Road". In time for Record Store Day of 2019 in April, the band remastered their first EP, Big Summer Night, and their first album, We've Sobered Up, both released on vinyl for the first time. Later that year, the band release new single "Your Book" with B-side "Good People".

Changwon Kim last played with Say Sue Me at the Eurockéennes festival in France of July 2019. Their new drummer is Sungwan Lim.

On October 12, 2019, the band announced that founding drummer Semin Kang had died. Following Semin's death, Say Sue Me reworked their single "Good For Some Reason" into a Spring and Winter version.

In December 2019, the band played a live performance for KEXP, making them the first ever Korean act to do so.

On August 10, 2020, Say Sue Me announced the departure of bassist Jaeyoung Ha from the group on the band's Instagram.

On October 4, 2020, Say Sue Me posted their first picture with current bassist Jaeyoung Kim.

In August 2021, Say Sue Me released new song "So Tender" for the soundtrack of Korean drama Nevertheless, streaming on Netflix. Shortly after, the band release a new song, "My Heart", made for another Korean TV series, Yumi's Cells.

The band were honoured to endorse Harmony guitars and Mono cases. They played two songs on the Harmony Jupiter and Silhouette electric guitar, exclusively for Harmony Home Sessions.

While the pandemic prevents any international touring for the band, Say Sue Me played a virtual tour, "The Time In Between". They played at local Busan venues Ol'55, Ovantgarde and The Basement, with the performances streamed online via Bandcamp.

On 13 May 2022, Say Sue Me released their third album entitled The Last Thing Left, which is the first album made since leaving their Korean label Electric Muse. The album was self-produced and recording in the band's own studio in Busan, released by Damnably records and Beach Town Music. The album received favourable reviews from Rolling Stone, "[Say Sue Me] continue to refine their unassuming rock music, adding a more nuanced emotional heft to their songs than ever before" and Pitchfork, "Making peace with the passing of their late drummer, the South Korean indie rockers lean into their gentler side as they channel noise-pop greats of yore".

== Musical style and influences ==
Say Sue Me's musical style has been described as surf rock or "surfgaze." The band has said that their surf rock sound was not intentional, but was likely influenced by their seaside hometown Busan and their practice room's proximity to the beach. The band's influences are mainly 60's surf rock and 90's indie rock and inspired by bands like Yo La Tengo, Pavement, Blur, Seam, The Ventures and Cat Power.

Choi sings in both Korean and English, and has said that she finds it harder to sing in Korean because she feels more "exposed".

== Members ==
Current

- Sumi Choi – vocals (2012–present)
- Byungkyu Kim – guitar (2012–present)
- Sungwan Lim – drums (2019–present)
- Jaeyoung Kim – bass (2020–present)

Former

- Jaeyoung Ha – bass (2012–2020)
- Semin Kang – drums (2012–2016)
- Changwon Kim – drums (2016–2019)

== Discography ==
=== Studio albums ===
Title	Album details	Peak chart positions
Title	Album details	KOR
We've Sobered Up	Released: 2 October 2014; Label: Electric Muse, Damnably; Format: LP, CD, digital download	64
Where We Were Together	Released: 13 April 2018; Label: Electric Muse, Damnably; Format: LP, CD, digital download	—
The Last Thing Left	Released: 13 May 2022; Label: Damnably, Beach Town Music; Format: LP, CD, digital download	—
"—" denotes release did not chart.

=== Compilation albums ===
Title	Album details
Say Sue Me	Released: 28 April 2017; Label: Damnably; Format: CD, digital download

=== Extended plays ===
Title	EP details	Peak chart positions
Title	EP details	KOR
Big Summer Night	Released: 7 July 2015; Label: Electric Muse, Damnably; Format: CD, digital download	79
Semin	Released: 22 April 2017; Label: Damnably; Format: Digital download	—
It's Just a Short Walk!	Released: 21 April 2018; Label: Damnably; Format: Digital download	—
Christmas, It's Not a Biggie	Released: 7 December 2018; Label: Electric Muse, Damnably; Format: CD, digital download	—
Time Is Not Yours	Released: 30 April 2025; Label: Damnably; Format: CD, digital download	—
"—" denotes release did not chart.

=== Other releases ===
Split 7" with Otoboke Beaver (2017, Damnably)

== Awards and nominations ==
Year	Award	Category	Nominated work	Result	Ref.
2019	Korean Music Awards	Album of the Year	Where We Were Together	Nominated	
2019	Korean Music Awards	Best Modern Rock Album	Where We Were Together	Won	
2019	Korean Music Awards	Artist of the Year	Say Sue Me	Nominated	
2019	Korean Music Awards	Song of the Year	"Old Town"	Nominated	
2019	Korean Music Awards	Best Modern Rock Song	"Old Town"	Won	
