= Otoboke Beaver =

Japanese punk rock band

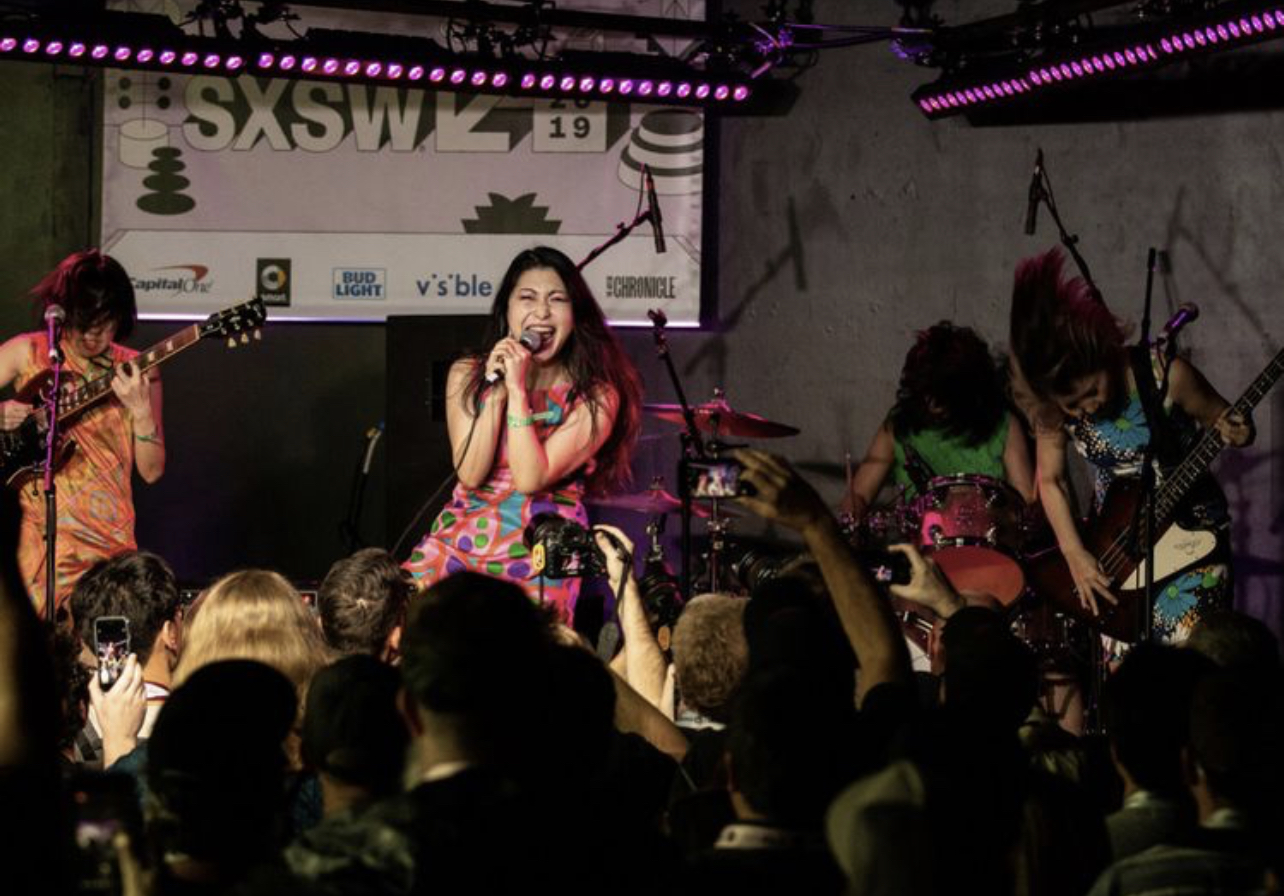
- Otoboke Beaver performing at the 2019 SXSW Festival, with former drummer Kahokiss

Background information
- Origin: Kyoto, Japan
- Genres: Punk rock; garage rock; riot grrrl; hardcore punk; garage punk; alternative rock
- Years active: 2009–present
- Label: Damnably
- Members: Accorinrin; Yoyoyoshie; Hirochan; Leo
- Past members: Nishikawachi; Pop; Kahokiss
- Website: otobokebeaver.com

Otoboke Beaver (Japanese: おとぼけビ～バ～) is a Japanese punk rock band from Kyoto, formed in 2009. The band currently consists of singer Accorinrin, guitarist Yoyoyoshie, bassist Hirochan, and drummer Leo. Their most recent album Super Champon was released in May 2022.

== History ==
=== Early history ===
Otoboke Beaver is named after a love hotel in Osaka which was located near the high school of one of the band members. The band formed in 2009 while the members were active in a rock music club at Ritsumeikan University in Kyoto. The original members included Accorinrin on vocals, Yoyoyoshie on guitar, Pop on drums, and Nishikawachi on bass.

In June 2011, Otoboke Beaver released a demo CD featuring three songs, including an early version of "Chuchu Song", a live track that would be later re-recorded and distributed to people who helped fund the band's first trip to the United States. In 2012, the group released their first live album via Egypt Records. In 2013, they released a limited-edition single via Jet Set Records, featuring the newly recorded "Otobokebeaver Daijikenbo" and two live tracks. In March of the same year, the band released the mini-album Love Me Sign. Bassist Nishikawachi left the band in 2013 and was replaced by Hirochan, a fan who asked to join via e-mail.

Otoboke Beaver participated in Record Store Day in 2015, releasing the single "Akimahenka" on vinyl. In 2016, the band signed with the British label Damnably. The Okoshiyasu!! Otoboke Beaver compilation album was released that year, featuring the majority of the songs found on the group's first two mini-albums, with the addition of the "Akimahenka" single. The band recorded a live session for XFM and toured the UK with Shonen Knife and Leggy. The EP Bakuro Book followed shortly thereafter, with another EP titled Love is Short!! appearing the following year for Record Store Day 2017. The song "Love Is Short!!" reached the UK singles chart.

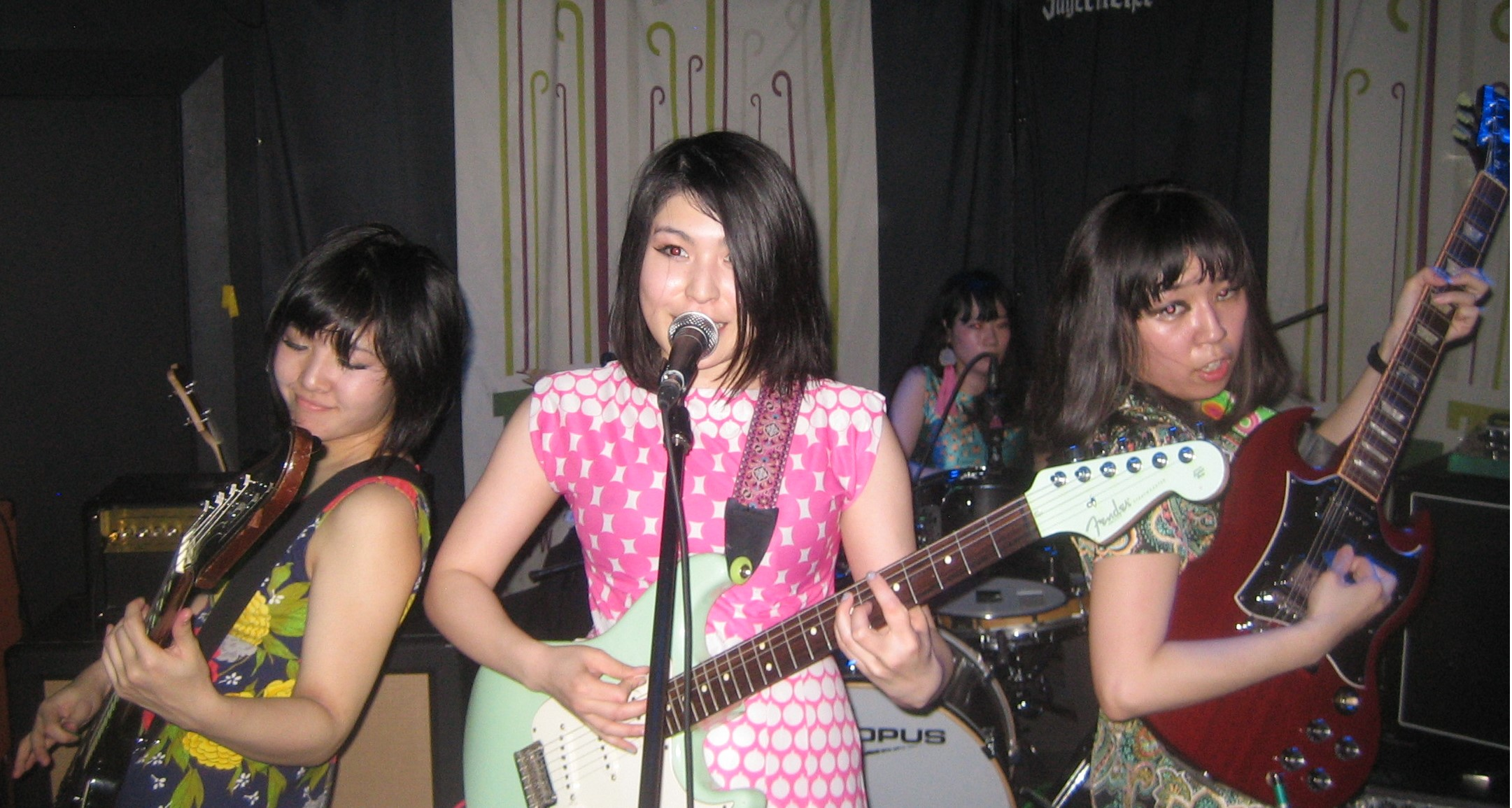
Performing in Nottingham, 2016, with original drummer Pop

The band began touring internationally in 2016, including dates at the 100 Club in London and the South by Southwest (SXSW) festival in the United States in 2017. Their trip to SXSW was financially assisted by fan-funding via Campfire and Kickstarter. In 2018, the band traveled over 24,000 miles (39,000 km) in one week to play two slots at the Coachella Festival and a three-date headlining tour in the UK with label-mates Say Sue Me and Leggy. Other notable tourmates have included The Cribs, Miyavi, Guitar Wolf, and Wussy.

The compilation album Okoshiyasu!! Otoboke Beaver was re-released on vinyl for Record Store Day in 2018. In that year, founding drummer Pop left the band. Pop was replaced by Kahokiss, who had attended the same university music club as the band's founding members almost a decade before.

In March 2019, Otoboke Beaver again performed at the SXSW festival in Austin, Texas. The album Itekoma Hits, featuring new songs and compiling some previously released singles, was released by Damnably in April 2019. The non-album single "Yobantoite Mojo" was released in late 2019; the song also served as the theme for the Japanese TV comedy Susumu Inomata and 8 Mojo. Also in late 2019, the band played the Koyabu Sonic festival, featuring a mixture of comedy acts and bands in an 8000-person stadium held by the Yoshimoto company.

=== International recognition ===
Along with releasing the single "Dirty Old Fart is Waiting for My Reaction" in early 2020, the members of Otoboke Beaver quit their day jobs to become a full-time touring band. They were able to tour for two weeks in Europe before the COVID-19 pandemic. During the lockdown period they focused on developing new songs and played several live shows via Instagram. The album Super Champon was released in May 2022. Otoboke Beaver returned to touring in late 2022 with a series of shows in Europe, followed by their first full-length tour of North America. Another tour of Europe and North America followed in early 2023. Their performance at that year's SXSW received coverage from Rolling Stone, which described their set as "both a goddamned riot and tight as hell."

The band embarked on a short tour of Australia and New Zealand in late 2023, followed by another tour of the United States and Canada in early 2024. These touring efforts attracted the attention of larger-market bands who invited Otoboke Beaver to serve as the opening act for shows in large venues, including Red Hot Chili Peppers and Green Day. In summer 2025, the band announced that drummer Kahokiss would take time off due to pregnancy, and recruited former Shonen Knife member Emi "Leo" Morimoto as the fill-in drummer for upcoming shows. In July 2025 the band released two live albums titled Live at Fandango and Live at KatuKatu.

The band appeared at the annual Lollapalooza music festival in Chicago in August 2025. In fall 2025 they opened arena shows in Japan for Foo Fighters and Oasis. This was followed by a short tour of South America in October/November 2025. In January 2026, the band announced the retirement of Kahokiss, with touring drummer Leo becoming a permanent member. Three final shows featuring Kahokiss were held in Japan in April 2026. That month, the band released its first new music in four years via three singles made available at Bandcamp; these are also the final recordings featuring Kahokiss. With new fulltime drummer Leo, the band toured Europe as the opening act for Foo Fighters in June 2026. The following month the band appeared at the Mosswood Meltdown Festival in Oakland, California, where they were introduced by filmmaker John Waters.

== Musical style and influences ==
According to its members, the band plays a "fast-paced and aggressive style of punk-rock", with "frequent changes in rhythm and tempo", accompanied by "gang vocals". Their songs feature love and relationships as regular themes, some based on singer Accorinrin's own experiences, and often critique the social roles required of women in modern Japanese society. This was not something Accorinrin was necessarily conscious of at first but she has embraced these feminist ideals after traveling abroad.

They have said they are inspired by a particular style of traditional Japanese comedy, Manzai. Its speed, tempo, and rhythm of delivery are an influence on their musical style. Accorinrin specifies Japanese comedian Ken Shimura and theatre comedy group Yoshimoto Shinkigeki as personal influences.

Each member draws inspiration from her own differing musical tastes: Yoyoyoshie likes Japanese rock, Hirochan likes hardcore punk, and Accorinrin and Kahokiss like Japanese pop music. They said that they are “influenced by western Riot Grrrl attitudes and the sounds of punk and angular post-rock”. The band mentioned further influences from groups such as Yapoos, Hikasyu, P-MODEL, Momoe Yamaguchi, and Afrirampo.

== Critical response ==
Otoboke Beaver's music has garnered them praise from the likes of Pitchfork ("even if their music is not explicitly feminist, there is power in hearing a group of four Asian women say exactly what they want"), and also from NPR, The Fader, Stereogum, i-D, and Fujirock Express.

In 2017, they were nominated for Best Live Act at the AIM Independent Music Awards. They have been featured on BBC6 radio. Dave Grohl of Foo Fighters described Otoboke Beaver by saying, "It’ll blow your mind, dude. It’s the most fucking intense shit you’ve ever seen." Upon the release of their album Super Champon in 2022, Anthony Fantano of The Needle Drop remarked "with two really fantastic albums under their belt at this point, is Otoboke Beaver not one of the best modern Punk bands that Japan has to offer right now?" Guitarist Yoyoyoshie has received praise for her playing style from several notable international musicians including Jack White and Eddie Vedder.

== Members ==
Current members

- Accorinrin (あっこりんりん) – vocals, occasional rhythm guitar (2009–present)
- Yoyoyoshie (よよよしえ) – guitar, backing vocals (2009–present)
- Hirochan (ひろちゃん) – bass, backing vocals (2013–present)
- Leo (れお) - drums, backing vocals (2025–present)

Former members

- Nishikawachi (西川ち) – bass, backing vocals (2009–2013)
- Pop (ぽっぷ) – drums, backing vocals (2009–2018)
- Kahokiss (かほキッス) – drums, backing vocals (2018–2026)

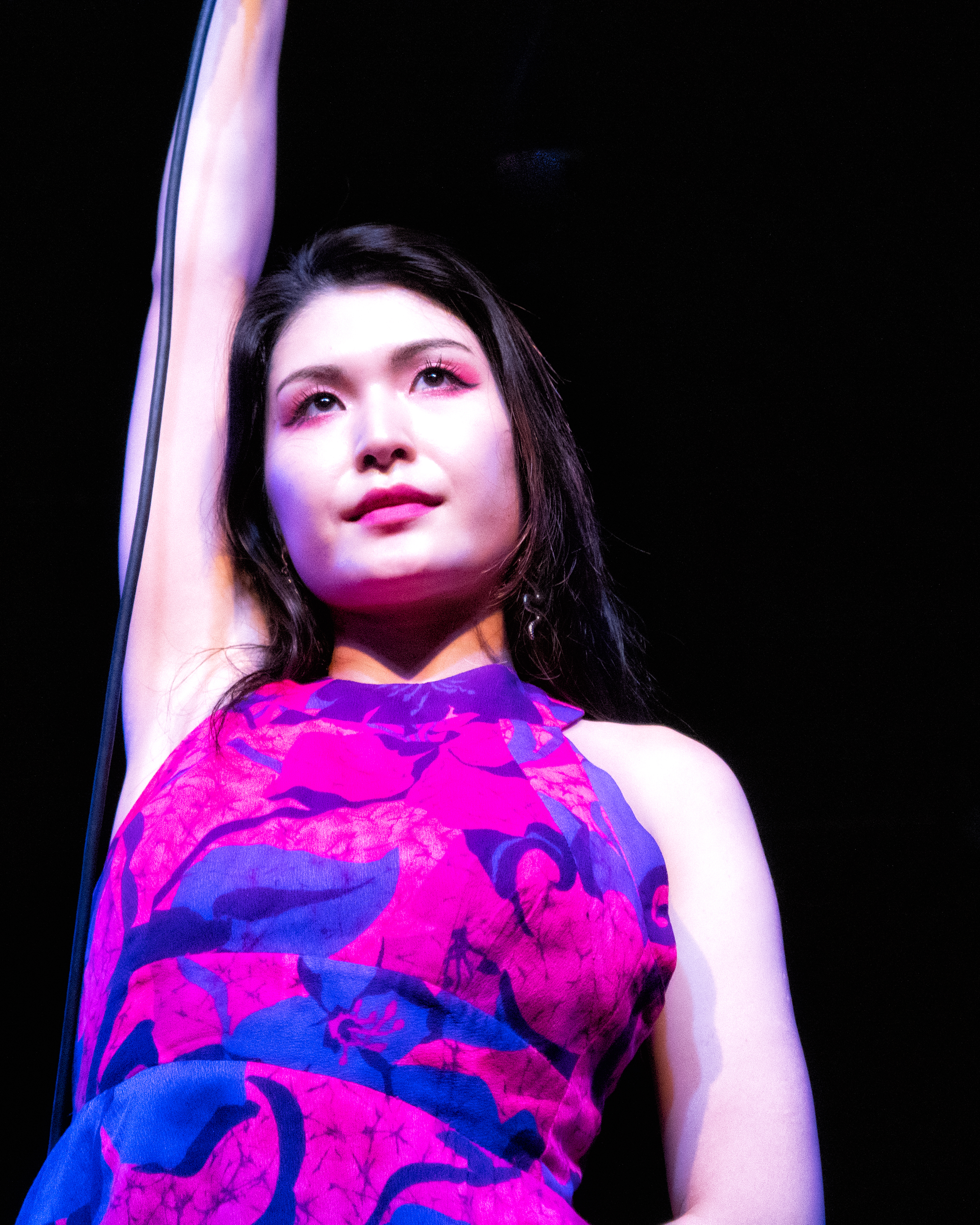
Accorinrin

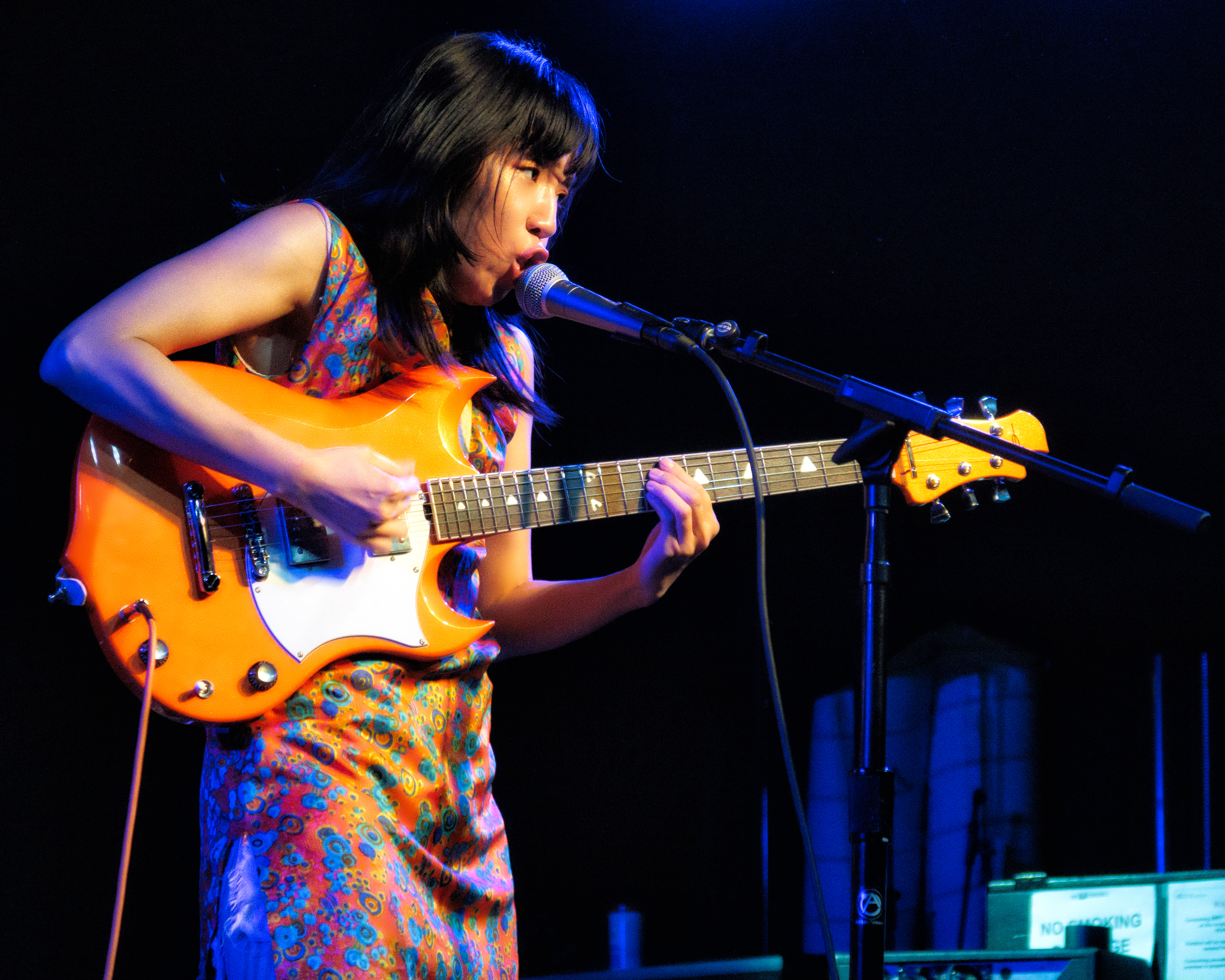
Yoyoyoshie

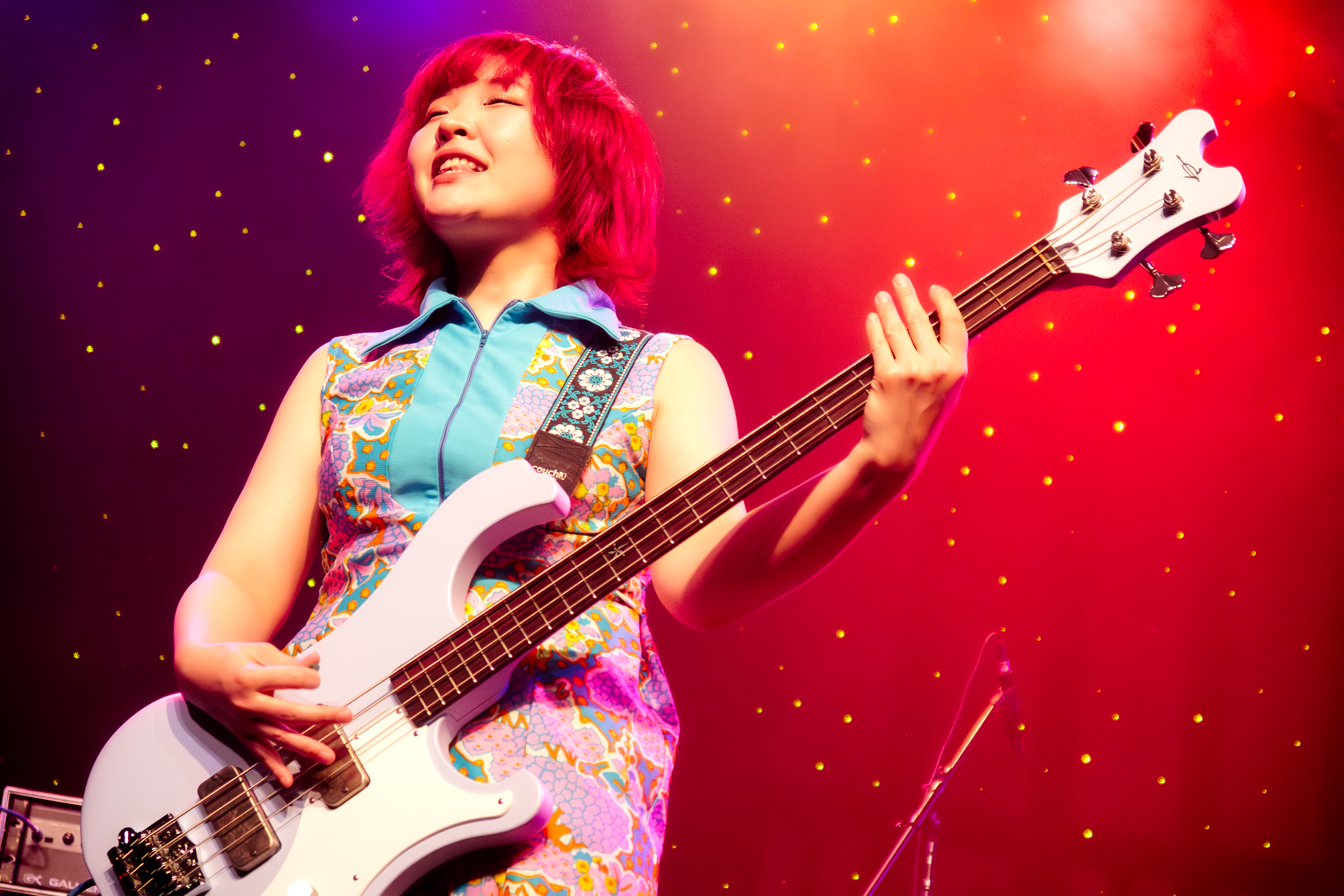
Hirochan

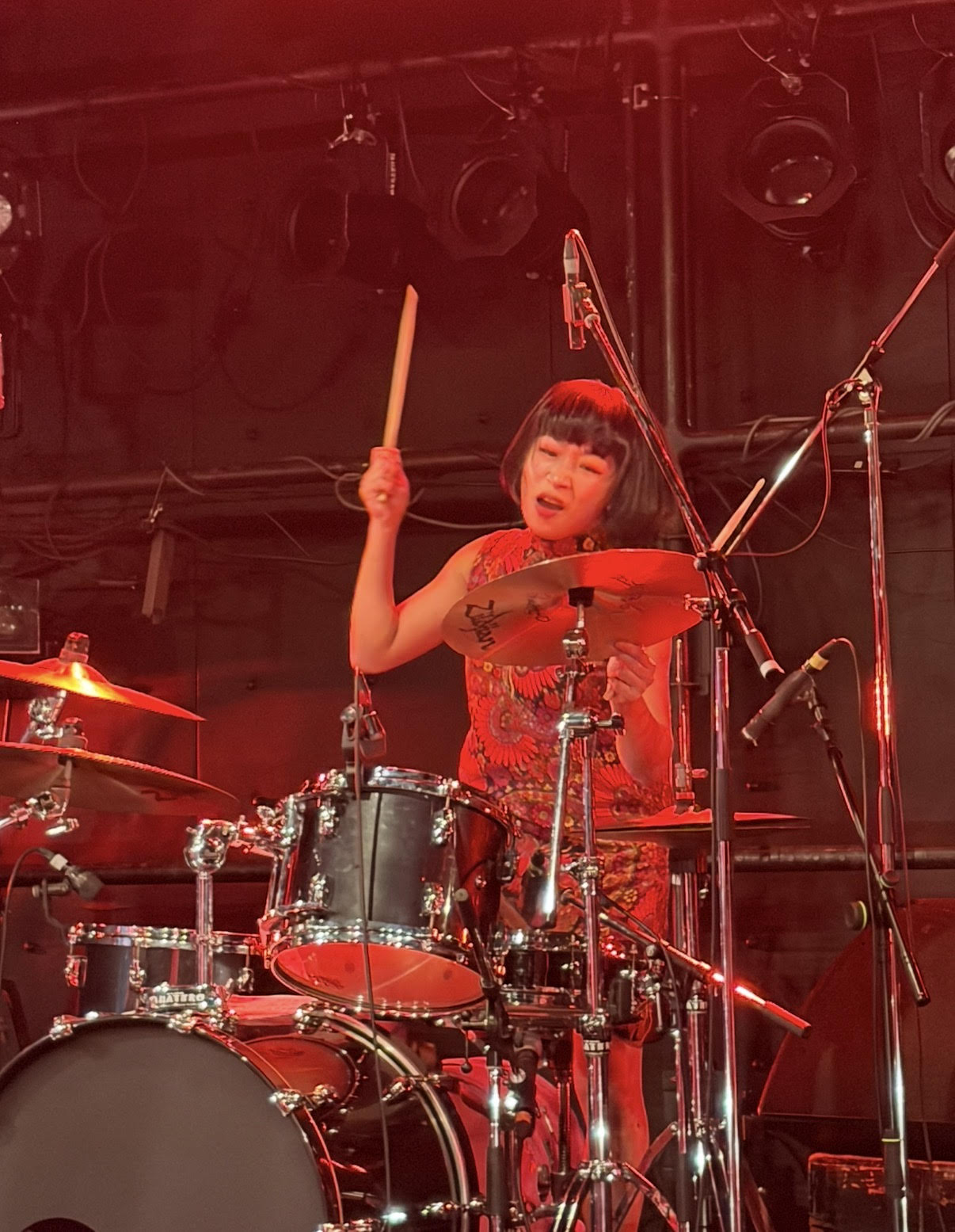
Leo

== Discography ==
=== Albums ===
- Anata No Ai De Manshitsu-chū (あなたの愛で満室中; demo, 2011)
- Konya Kagiri Nante Zettai Honto ni Iwasenai! (今夜限りなんて絶対ほんとに言わせないっ!; EP, 2011)
- Present Progressive Form #002 (live, 2012)
- Love Me Sign (EP, 2013)
- Okoshiyasu!! Otoboke Beaver (compilation, 2016)
- Bakuro Book (EP, 2016)
- Love Is Short!! (EP, 2017)
- Okoshiyasu!! Otoboke Beaver (remastered version, 2018)
- Itekoma Hits (2019)
- Super Champon (2022)
- Live at Fandango (live, 2025)
- Live at TakuTaku (live, 2025)

=== Singles ===
- "Otobokebeaver Daijikenbo" (おとぼけビ～バ～大事件簿; 2013)
- "Akimahenka" (2015)
- "S'il Vous Plait" (2017) [split with Say Sue Me]
- "Anata Watashi Daita Ato Yome No Meshi" (2018)
- "Yobantoite Mojo" (2019)
- "Is the New Album Out Yet?" (maxi single, 2026)

=== Videos ===
- "S'il Vous Plait" (2017)
- "Love Is Short!" (2017)
- "Mean" (2017)
- "Anata Watashi Daita Ato Yome No Meshi" (2019)
- "Datsu, Hikage no Onna" (脱・日陰の女; 2019, directed by Haruka Mitani)
- "Don't Light My Fire" (2019)
- "Dirty Old Fart Is Waiting For My Reaction" (2020)
- "I Am Not Maternal" (2022)
- "Pardon?" (2022)
- "I Don't Want to Die Alone" (2022)
- "I Don't Need to Be in Your Strike Zone" (2026)
