= Damnably =

English independent record label

Damnably Records
- Founded: 2006
- Founder: George Gargan; Janice Li
- Distributor: Proper/Utopia (UK/Europe) Redeye (US) Fuga (Digital)
- Genre: Punk, Indie Rock, Indie Pop, Alternative Rock
- Country of origin: UK
- Location: Stratford, London
- Official website: music.damnably.com

Damnably is an independent record label based in Stratford, East London. It was founded by George Gargan and Janice Li. Primarily created to promote a John Peel night at The Brixton Windmill in 2006, Damnably then undertook tour booking and evolved into a record label. It has since grown, adding a roster of artists from all around the world including USA, Canada, Japan, Korea, China, Indonesia, France and the UK.

== History ==
The label was founded in 2006 by George Gargan, of the band Former Utopia. He was later joined by filmmaker Janice Li. Together, the label was formed on a shoestring budget, incorporating a DIY approach which still remains an integral part of their ethos today.

The label's first release was a single by Former Utopia, and its first high-profile signing was Shonen Knife. After booking Shonen Knife for their first UK tour in 16 years, Damnably released their album, Super Group, which including additional live bonus tracks.

Successful London gigs led to more gigs nationwide as well as shows at SXSW in Austin, TX. Tours were booked for Julie Dorion, Dick Dale, Shonen Knife, Codeine, Come, Bitch Magnet, Wussy, Geoff Farina (of Karate) & Chris Brokaw (Come/Codeine/The New Year). Golden Week tours were booked for Otoboke Beaver as the Japanese band often did not share the same holidays as western workers, meaning this national holiday was the only time they could tour. Say Sue Me, Leggy and Drinking Boys and Girls Choir joined them as support.

Damnably hosted a series of World International The Fall, Smog and Sonic Youth nights featuring bands from out of London covering a song or two, in additional to playing their own set. Bar sales went towards bands who struggled to get London shows that were not pay-to-play. This led to a large triple stage World International John Peel Day event for two years, raising money for charities and with a large number of acts.

In April 2017, Damnably put on a show with Jon Fine (of Bitch Magnet) chatting to comedian Stewart Lee, followed by a performance with Jon and members from smallgang.

Say Sue Me toured extensively in 2018 playing all across the globe. They were the first ever Korean band to record a KEXP session, with Drinking Boys and Girls Choir being the third. In 2019, Say Sue Me won two Korean Music awards.

Damnably's acts performed as showcasing artists at SXSW for several years. In 2018, Otoboke Beaver, Say Sue Me, American werewolf academy, Leggy and didi performed. In 2019, Otoboke Beaver, Say Sue Me, Drinking Boys and Girls Choir, David Boring, Construction and Destruction, American Werewolf Academy performed. And in 2021, Otoboke Beaver, Say Sue Me, DBGC, Hazy Sour Cherry and Grrrl Gang performed in their online showcase.

Damnably acts have additionally performed at festivals like Coachella, Green Man, Fuji Rock, Primavera, Roskilde and Pohoda.

Damnably artists have performed sessions for BBC Radio, KEXP, XFM and even Vans. They have recorded songs for Netflix/JTBC shows, Anthony Bourdain's Parts Unknown, Japan's NHK documentary on SXSW.

Gargan and Li were married in the late 2010s, Say Sue Me and Otoboke Beaver both wrote songs titled George & Janice to commemorate their label bosses' wedding.

Damnably has been very vocal about gender representation in the music industry, with festival line-ups and agency rosters in the UK being dominated by white male acts, while Damnably's roster, invariably featuring women, is often ignored.

As Damnably's success grew, they quickly ran out of space operating out of their flats, opting to invest in a proper office space. As of 2019, Damnably are now based in a studio at Trampery on the Gantry.

== Artists ==
List of artists represented.

- Otoboke Beaver
- Say Sue Me
- Drinking Boys and Girls Choir
- Grrrl Gang
- Wussy
- Hazy Sour Cherry
- Bananach
- David Boring
- Hiperson
- o'summer vacation
- ODDLY
- Dogstar
- The Magic Words
- American Werewolf Academy
- didi
- Leggy
- Shonen Knife
- smallgang
- Former Utopia
- Lazarus Clamp
- Chris Brokaw
- Geoff Farina
- Chris Brokaw & Geoff Farina
- Glorytellers
- Exit Verse
- Yuki Kawana
- Yucca
- Bruja
- Joel RL Phelps
- Capt. Lovelace
- Golden Gurls

== Professional Bodies ==
Damnably is a member of the BPI, PRS for Music Limited, MCPS and Association of Independent Promoters (AIP).

== Discography ==
List of releases including the artist, title, medium and release year.

- DAMNABLY001 - Former Utopia, Michael L. Clamp, The Philanthropists - Tiptoe Through The Tulips / Don't Fence Me In / I Love Micky - 7" - 2010
- DAMNABLY002 - Shonen Knife - Super Group - CD - 2010
- DAMNABLY003 - Chris Brokaw and Geoff Farina - The Angel's Message To Me - CD - 2010
- DAMNABLY004 - Chris Brokaw and Geoff Farina - The Boarder's Door - CD - 2010
- DAMNABLY005 - Shonen Knife - Free Time - CD - 2011
- DAMNABLY006 - smallgang - Trespasses - CD - 2011
- DAMNABLY007 - American Werewolf Academy - The Hop / The Kid Stays In The Picture - 7" - 2011
- DAMNABLY008 - American Werewolf Academy - Everything Is Alright So Far - CD - 2011
- DAMNABLY010 - Shonen Knife - Osaka Ramones - CD - 2011
- DAMNABLY016 - Shonen Knife - Sweet Christmas - 7" - 2011
- DAMNABLY015 - Geoff Farina - The Wishes of the Dead - CD - 2012
- DAMNABLY018 - Wussy - Buckeye - CD - 2012
- DAMNABLY019 - Shonen Knife - Pop Tune - CD - 2012
- DAMNABLY020 - Chris Brokaw - Gambler's Ecstasy - CD - 2012
- DAMNABLY021 - Former Utopia - FU - CD, EP - 2013
- DAMNABLY022 - Golden Gurls - Typo Magic - CD - 2013
- DAMNABLY023 - Bored Spies - Summer720 - CD, 7" - 2013
- DAMNABLY024 - Glorytellers - Current Resident - CD - 2013
- DAMNABLY025 - smallgang - No Pain Whatsoever - CD - 2013
- DAMNABLY026 - American Werewolf Academy - Out Of Place All The Time - CD - 2013
- DAMNABLY027 - American Werewolf Academy - Edge of the Bed / Pray a Lie - 7" - 2013
- DAMNABLY028 - Joel RL Phelps & The Downer Trio - Gala - CD - 2013
- DAMNABLY030 - Shonen Knife - Overdrive - CD, LP - 2014
- DAMNABLY031 - Wussy - Attica! - CD - 2014
- DAMNABLY032 - smallgang - san - CD - 2014
- DAMNABLY033 - Exit Verse - Exit Verse - CD, LP - 2014
- DAMN29LP - Lazarus Clamp - The Bird is Not The Metaphor - LP - 2015
- DAMNABLY034 - American Werewolf Academy - I Can't Lose - 7" - 2015
- DAMNABLY035 - WOMPS - Live A Little Less - 7", CD - 2015
- DAMNABLY035 - Captain Lovelace - /* Preview Pane */ - Cass - 2015
- DAMNABLY038 - Wussy - Dropping Houses / Folk Night at Fucky's - CD - 2016
- DAMNABLY038 - Wussy - Forever Sounds - CD - 2016
- DAMNABLY039 - Otoboke Beaver - Okoshiyasu!! Otoboke Beaver - CD, LP - 2016
- DAMNABLY040 - Shonen Knife - Adventure - CD, LP - 2016
- DAMNABLY043 - Bruja - Tori / Sculie - 7" - 2016
- DAMNABLY044 - Leggy - Leggy - CD, LP - 2016
- DAMNABLY045 - Wussy - Ceremony / Days and Hours - 7" - 2016
- DAMNABLY047 - American Werewolf Academy - Dead Without Dying & Gleefully Detached - CD, LP - 2017
- DAMNABLY048 - Say Sue Me - Say Sue Me - CD - 2017
- DAMNABLY049 - Say Sue Me - Semin - 7" - 2017
- DAMNABLY050 - Otoboke Beaver - Love is Short!! - CD, EP - 2017
- DAMNABLY055 - The Magic Words - The Magic Words - Cass - 2017
- DAMNABLY058 - Say Sue Me, Otoboke Beaver - Split 7" - 7" - 2017
- DAMNABLY064 - Say Sue Me - It's Just a Short Walk - EP - 2018
- DAMNABLY067 - Say Sue Me - Where We Were Together - CD, LP - 2018
- DAMNABLY068 - Wussy - Getting Better - EP - 2018
- DAMNABLY069 - Wussy - What Heaven is Like - CD, LP - 2018
- DAMNABLY071 - Say Sue Me - Just Joking Around / B Lover - 7" - 2018
- DAMNABLY072 - didi - Like Memory Foam - CD - 2018
- DAMNABLY079 - Say Sue Me - Christmas, It's Not a Biggie - EP - 2018
- DAMNABLY074 - Say Sue Me - Big Summer Night - EP - 2019
- DAMNABLY075 - Say Sue Me - We've Sobered Up - LP - 2019
- DAMNABLY078 - Drinking Boys and Girls Choir - Keep Drinking - CD, LP - 2019
- DAMNABLY080 - Otoboke Beaver - Itekoma Hits - CD, LP - 2019
- DAMNABLY090 - Say Sue Me - Your Book / Good People - 7" - 2019
- DAMNABLY093 - Otoboke Beaver - Yobantoite Mojo - 5" - 2019
- DAMNABLY096 - Hiperson - Four Seasons - EP - 2019
- DAMNABLY098 - Hazy Sour Cherry - Tour De Tokyo - LP - 2019
- Say Sue Me - George & Janice - 7" - 2019
- DAMNABLY099 - Grrrl Gang - Here To Stay! - LP - 2020
- DAMNABLY073 - David Boring - Unnatural Objects and Their Humans - LP - 2020
- DAMNABLY092 - Former Utopia - Magnetar - LP - 2020
- DAMNABLY097 - Dogstar - Dogstar - LP - 2020
- DAMNABLY100 - Otoboke Beaver - I am Not Maternal - Digital - 2020
- DAMNABLY124 - o'summer vacation - Wicked Heart - LP - 2021
- DAMNABLY126 - Grrrl Gang - Honey, Baby - 7" - 2021
- DAMNABLY151 - Say Sue Me - 10 - Cass, EP - 2022
- DAMNABLY123 - Drinking Boys and Girls Choir - Marriage License - LP - 2022
- DAMNABLY140 - Say Sue Me - The Last Thing Left - CD, LP - 2022
- DAMNABLY145 - Hazy Sour Cherry - Strange World - CD, LP - 2022
- DAMNABLY150 - Otoboke Beaver - Super Champon - CD, LP - 2022
