= Indonesian Idol season 5 =

Indonesian Idol
- Season 5
- Hosted by: Daniel Mananta; Dewi Sandra
- Judges: Indra Lesmana; Titi DJ; Anang Hermansyah
- Winner: Januarisman
- Runner-up: Gisella Anastasia

Release
- Original network: RCTI
- Original release: April 4 – August 2, 2008

Season chronology
- ← Previous; Season 4 Next → Season 6

The fifth season of Indonesian Idol began on April 4, 2008 and finished on August 2, 2008. Amelia Natasha was replaced by Dewi Sandra as the co-host with Daniel Mananta.

Auditions were held in the following cities:

- Medan
- Palembang
- Manado
- Ambon
- Surabaya
- Yogyakarta
- Bandung
- Jakarta
- Denpasar

== Elimination chart ==
Females	Males	Top 24	Wild card	Top 12	Winner

Did not perform	Safe	Safe First	Safe last	Eliminated

Stage		Semi-finals		Wild card	Finals										
Date		5/2	5/9	5/9	5/16	5/23	5/30	6/6	6/13	6/20	6/27	7/4	7/11	7/18	8/2
Place	Contestant	Result													
1	Aris Runtuwene		Top 12							Bottom 3	Bottom 3	Bottom 3			Winner
2	Gisella Anastasia		Top 12					Bottom 3	Bottom 3				Bottom 3		Runner Up
3	Patudu Manik		Top 12			Bottom 3			Bottom 3			Bottom 3	Bottom 3	Elim	
4	Kunto Aji Wibisono		Top 12				Bottom 3				Bottom 3		Elim		
5	Dyna Fransisca		Top 12			Bottom 3				Bottom 3		Elim			
6	Obet JR Habibu		Top 12								Elim				
7	Andy Makaruwung		Wildcard	Top 12						Elim					
8	Elizabeth Putri Estrya		Wildcard	Top 12				Bottom 3	Elim						
9	Dede Richo		Top 12				Bottom 3	Elim							
10	Tifany Florina		Top 12		Bottom 3		Elim								
11	Della Setia Kusumawati		Top 12		Bottom 3	Elim									
12	Safira Rachma Rizkika		Top 12		Elim										
13-14	Indra Cipta Gunadi		Wildcard	Elim											
13-14	Yuka Kharisma		Wildcard	Elim											
15-16	Nur Ikwantoko		Elim												
15-16	TH Endah Paniwulan		Elim												
17-24	Agatha Nurdiana	Elim													
17-24	Chandra Janaiver Singkoh	Elim													
17-24	Guido Firdaus Hutagalung	Elim													
17-24	Hatna Danarda	Elim													
17-24	Irene Karompis	Elim													
17-24	Mario Octavianus	Elim													
17-24	Reny Dara Agustin	Elim													
17-24	Twenty Sriwulan	Elim													
