= Indy Barends =

Indonesian actress (born 1972)

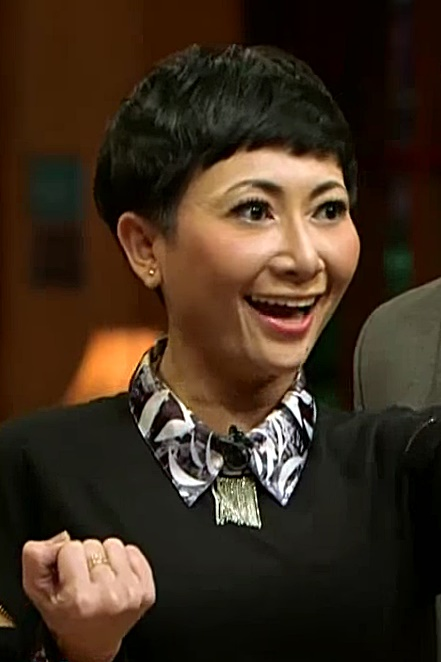
- Barends in 2017
- Born: Mendya Barends; 15 January 1972 (age 53); Bogor, West Java, Indonesia

Mendya Barends Sarmanella (born 15 January 1972), better known as Indy Barends, is an Indonesian radio personality, television host, presenter, humorist, and actress. She began her career as a radio DJ, and rose in popularity from the talk show Ceriwis at Trans TV. She has also been a judge at the Indonesian Idol and Indonesia's Got Talent shows.

== Early life ==
Mendya Barends was born on 15 January 1972 in Bogor to Hiras Paimatua Sidabutar and Betty Khusen. She studied in Bogor, completing high school at the Regina Pacis School in Bogor.

== Career ==
Barends began to work at Jakarta's Hard Rock FM station as a marketing staff, where she was offered a job as a radio DJ by then-senior announcer Meuthia Kasim. In 2001, during her time at the station, she co-hosted continuously with Muhammad Farhan for 32 hours, breaking Indonesian national records, and they went on to hold the record until 2019. Barends and Farhan were later hired by TV station Trans TV to co-host the Good Morning on the Weekend show there. Barends later became famous after she co-hosted the talkshow Ceriwis with Indra Bekti starting in 2004, and became a judge in the third season of the Indonesian Idol talent show.

Due to changes in Ceriwis's format, Barends left the show in 2010 and moved to tvOne where she again co-hosted with Farhan. She also became a judge at Indonesia's Got Talent in its 2014 iteration. By 2017, she rarely featured in television presenting, and was largely a radio host. In 2019, she announced her retirement from radio presenting.

Aside from being a presenter, Barends has taken on roles in several movies, namely Ariel & Raja Langit (2005), The Photograph (2007), Cinta Setaman (2008), Red Cobex (2010), and Glorious Days (2019). In 2012, she along with several partners opened an Italian restaurant.

== Personal life ==
She married Benyamin Sarmanella in 2001, and the couple has two children.
