= Salma Salsabil =

Indonesian singer (born 2002)

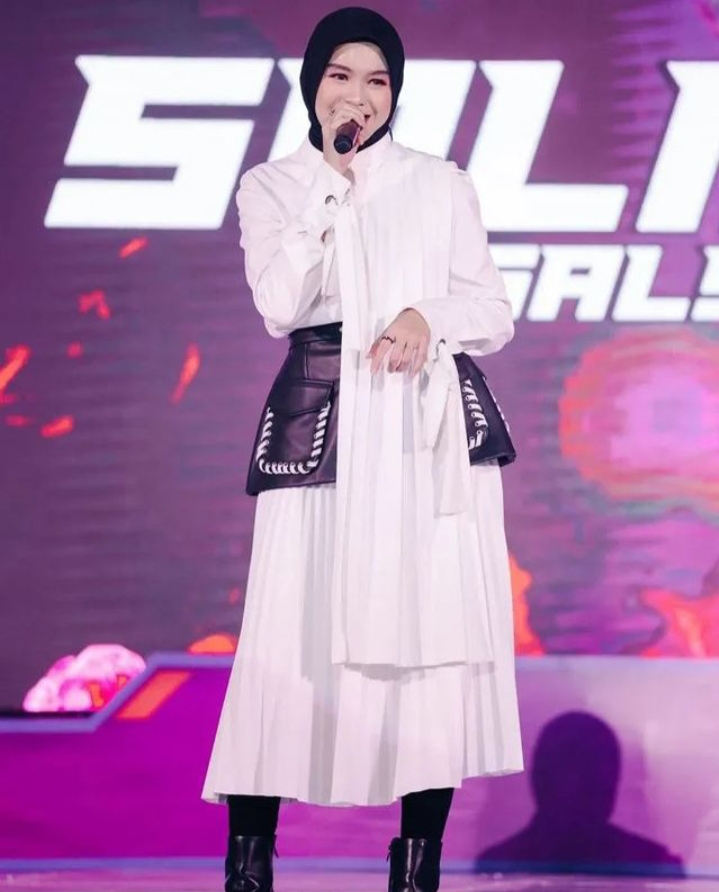
- Salma Salsabil in 2023
- Born: Salma Salsabil 'Aliyyah Putri Mandaya; 12 February 2002 (age 24); Probolinggo, East Java, Indonesia
- Other name: Salma
- Occupations: Singer; songwriter; actress; television presenter
- Years active: 2012–present
- Musical career
- Genres: Pop; pop kreatif; R&B
- Instruments: Vocals
- Label: Universal Music Indonesia

Salma Salsabil 'Aliyyah Putri Mandaya (born 12 February 2002) commonly known as Salma Salsabil, is an Indonesian singer-songwriter from Probolinggo, East Java. She won the twelfth season of Indonesian Idol broadcast by the television broadcaster RCTI in 2023, as well as being the first female singer wearing the hijab in the history of Indonesian Idol to win the competition. After winning, she performed the winning song as well as her debut single entitled "Menghargai Kata Rindu" which was released on 19 May 2023, with a different version from Nabila Taqiyyah, through the record label Universal Music Indonesia.

When participating in Indonesian Idol, Salma received the nickname Queen of Trending and Queen of Standing Ovation and was named as a participant who had "OK" (originality and quality) by one of the judges, namely Judika. Rossa, who is also one of the judges, said that Salsabil had created a new, very high benchmark for the next season of Indonesian Idol. Salma is the only contestant who has never been in an unsafe position from the Live Showcase round to the final round of the twelfth season.

== Early life and education ==
Salma is the youngest daughter of Ita Kusrini and Demis Ferid Mandaya. She has an older brother named Kelvinno Tama Putra Mandaya. Salma has the Mandaya surname which came from her father, who is a descendant of Muna, Southeast Sulawesi, because Salma, from the line of her grandfather named Laode Mandaya, is the grandson of a 26th King in the Kingdom of Muna (Wuna), named La Ode Bulae who ruled 1830–1861, with the title Sangia Laghada. Salma is also of Javanese and Madurese descent.

Salma began to like singing when she was in elementary school, she started by learning a musical instrument, namely the guitar, until then she formed a music group and finally she focused on being a soloist.

Salma graduated from SMK Negeri 12 Surabaya, East Java in 2020. She majored in Classical Music Arts competency, with a master's degree in guitar instruments. She is also known to choose keroncong extracurricular activities. Salma is recorded as having achieved a number of achievements representing her school in a number of competitions in the field of music, both at regional and national levels. Outside of school, she is also actively studying music by regularly performing in cafes as a solo singer or in a group, a wedding singer, and a singer at various events. Currently, Salma is a student majoring in Music Presentation at the Indonesia Institute of the Arts Yogyakarta. For winning the twelfth season of Indonesian Idol, the Chancellor gave an award in the form of releasing Salma from all the practicum courses she was taking.

== Career ==
Salma participated in Idola Cilik (fourth season), The Voice Kids Indonesia (first season), Rising Star Indonesia (second season), Sunsilk Hijab Hunt 2017 and The Voice Indonesia (third season) but failed to win the title. She had been once called a "failed artist" because she entered the small screen several times to take part in talent search events but had always failed. Finally, she won the twelfth season of the Indonesian Idol competition, defeating Nabila Taqiyyah through the vote count in the Result & Reunion round which took place on 22 May 2023.

== Discography ==
=== Singles ===
==== As featured artist ====
List of singles as lead artist, with chart positions and certifications, showing year released and album name
Title	Year	Peak chart positions	Album	Ref.
Title	Year	IDN Songs	Album	Ref.
"Ayah"	2014	*	non-album singles	
"Merindukanmu"	2022	—	non-album singles	
"Menghargai Kata Rindu"	2023	—	non-album singles	
"Bunga Hati"	2023	1	non-album singles	
"Rumah"	2024		non-album singles	
"Boleh Juga"	2024	11	non-album singles	
"—" denotes a recording that did not chart or was not released in that territory. "*" denotes that the charts did not exist at the time of release.

== Awards & nominations ==
Awards & nominations as main artist/work

Awards	Year	Category	Nominee/work	Result	Ref.
Anugerah Musik Indonesia	2023	Best of the Best Newcomer Artist	Salma Salsabil (Menghargai Kata Rindu)	Nominated	
Anugerah Musik Indonesia	2024	Best of the Best Production Work	Salma Salsabil (Bunga Hati)	Won	
Anugerah Musik Indonesia	2024	Best Solo Female Pop Artist	Salma Salsabil	Won	
Anugerah Musik Indonesia	2025	Best of the Best Production Work	Salma Salsabil (Berharap Pada Timur)	Pending	
Anugerah Musik Indonesia	2025	Best of the Best Album	Berharap Pada Timur (Salma Salsabil)	Pending	
Anugerah Musik Indonesia	2025	Best Pop Album	Berharap Pada Timur (Salma Salsabil)	Pending	
Anugerah Musik Indonesia	2025	Best Solo Female Pop Artist	Salma Salsabil (Berharap Pada Timur)	Pending	
Anugerah Musik Indonesia	2025	Best Pop Songwriter	Salma Salsabil & Clara Riva (Berharap Pada Timur)	Pending	
Indonesian Music Awards	2024	Female Singer of the Year	Salma Salsabil	Won	
Indonesian Music Awards	2024	Breakthrough Artist of the Year	Salma Salsabil	Won	
Asian Television Awards	2024	Most Popular Solo Female Performer (Jupiter Music Awards)	Salma Salsabil	Won	
Music Awards Japan	2025	Indonesian Popular Music (International Special Award)	Salma Salsabil (Bunga Hati)	Won	
Indonesian Television Awards	2023	Most Popular Television Newcomer Artist	Salma Salsabil	Won	
Spotify Wrapped Live	2024	Indonesia Top Radar Artist of the Year	Salma Salsabil	Won	
Indonesian Inspiring Celebrity Awards	2025	Rising Star Celebrity	Salma Salsabil	Won	
Dahsyatnya Awards	2023	Most Dahsyat (Amazing) Newcomer Artist	Salma Salsabil	Won	
Silet Awards	2023	Most Silet (Sharp) Newcomer Artist	Salma Salsabil	Won	
Go Spot Awards	2023	Uprising Singer of the Year	Salma Salsabil	Won	
Bandung Music Awards	2023	Most Popular Newcomer Artist - General Category	Salma Salsabil	Nominated	
Angket Mustang Awards	2023	Most Blooming Artist	Salma Salsabil	Won	
Voks Radio Award	2023	Most Played Pop Song of the Year (by General)	Salma Salsabil (Menghargai Kata Rindu)	Won	
Voks Radio Award	2023	Most Played Song of the Year (by Newcomer Artist)	Salma Salsabil (Menghargai Kata Rindu)	Won	
Pop Asia Awards	2023	Most Viral Song on TikTok	Salma Salsabil (Bunga Hati)	Won	

Awards & nominations as related artist/work

Awards	Year	Category	Nominee/work	Result	Ref.
Anugerah Musik Indonesia	2024	Best Pop Music Composer/Arranger	Arya Aditya Ramadhya, Ilman Ibrahim Isa, Nino Kayam (Boleh Juga - Salma Salsabil)	Nominated	
Anugerah Musik Indonesia	2024	Best Pop Music Composer/Arranger	S/EEK (Bunga Hati - Salma Salsabil)	Won	
Anugerah Musik Indonesia	2024	Best Pop Songwriter	Laleilmanino (Boleh Juga - Salma Salsabil)	Nominated	
Anugerah Musik Indonesia	2024	Best Pop Songwriter	Clara Riva (Bunga Hati - Salma Salsabil)	Nominated	
Anugerah Musik Indonesia	2024	Best Recording Producer	Laleilmanino (Boleh Juga - Salma Salsabil)	Nominated	
Anugerah Musik Indonesia	2024	Best Recording Producer	S/EEK (Bunga Hati - Salma Salsabil)	Won	
Anugerah Musik Indonesia	2024	Best Audio Production Team	Dimas Pradipta (Bunga Hati - Salma Salsabil)	Won	
Anugerah Musik Indonesia	2025	Best Pop Music Composer/Arranger	S/EEK (Berharap Pada Timur - Salma Salsabil)	Pending	
Anugerah Musik Indonesia	2025	Best Recording Producer	S/EEK (Berharap Pada Timur - Salma Salsabil)	Pending	
Anugerah Musik Indonesia	2025	Best Vocal Arrangement	Barsena Bestandhi (Berharap Pada Timur - Salma Salsabil)	Pending	
Angket Mustang Awards	2023	Most Support System	Salmine (Official Fanbase Salma Salsabil)	Won	
