= Joy Tobing =

Indonesian musician

- Born: Joy Destiny Tiurma Tobing; 20 March 1980 (age 46); Jakarta, Indonesia
- Origin: Indonesia
- Genres: Pop, Gospel
- Occupation: Singer
- Years active: 1996–present
- Labels: Rhema Records, Sony BMG

Joy Destiny Tiurma Tobing (born 20 March 1980) is an Indonesian gospel singer and the winner of the first season of Indonesian Idol.

== Biography ==
Tobing was a gospel singer when she signed up for the first season of Indonesian Idol, leading to some criticism since she was not considered an amateur.

She was expected to represent Indonesia in the Asian Idol and World Idol competitions, but disagreement arose with the idol show management, Indomugi Pratama, and her recording company, BMG Indonesia, insisting that as an artist she should not only have obligations but also have rights. During a press conference in November 2004, the team of Indomugi Pratama, BMG Indonesia, RCTI, and FremantleMedia, who hold the license for the Indonesian Idol program, claimed they were not sending Tobing to any Asian or World Idol because of this. They considered her disobedience to be her failure to behave as a good idol.

In March 2005, Tobing terminated her contract with BMG Indonesia which, in September 2004, released her Idol album Terima Kasih. At her press conference, Tobing and her lawyer stated that the reason she had long been treated unfairly, BMG Indonesia had never informed her about the selling of the album and did not give her any royalties.

== Contests ==
- 1994: Cipta Pesona Bintang, RCTI
- 1995: 1 Final Aksi, RCTI
- 1997: Pioneer Asia 5th Laser Karaoke Competition
- 2004: Indonesian Idol, RCTI
- 2013: "Fake ID"

== Indonesian Idol performances ==
- Top 30: Nothing Compares 2 U by Sinéad O'Connor
- Top 11: Seindah Biasa by Siti Nurhaliza
- Top 9: Khayal by Purnama Sultan
- Top 8: To Love You More by Céline Dion
- Top 7: Pelangi by Chrisye
- Top 6: Kamu Harus Cepat Pulang by Slank
- Top 5: Pesta by Elfa's Singer
- Top 4: Mengertilah Kasih by Ruth Sahanaya
- Top 4: Kuakui by Dewi Sandra
- Top 3: Yang Terbaik by Ruth Sahanaya
- Top 3: Surat Cinta by Vina Panduwinata
- Grand Final: Karena Cinta by Glenn Fredly
- Grand Final: Kuakui by Dewi Sandra
- Grand Final: The Trouble With Love Is by Kelly Clarkson

== Golden Memories Asia performances ==
- Top 24: Jangan Biarkan by Diana Nasution
- Top 20: Cinta Jangan Kau Pergi by Sheila Majid
- Top 16: Tanda-tanda by Mus Mujiono
- Top 12: Logika by Vina Panduwinata
- Top 9 Show Seandainya Aku Punya Sayap by Rita Butar-butar
- Top 9 Result: Mata Lelaki by Nicky Astria
- Top 6 Show: Ekspresi by Titi DJ
- Top 6 Result: Nuansa Bening by Keenan Nasution
- Top 4 Show: Cinta by Titiek Puspa
- Top 4 Result: TBA
- Grand Final Show: TBA
- Grand Final Result: TBA

== Controversy ==
Before joining the Indonesian Idol competition, Tobing had released several records, mostly Christian songs and songs in her family's ethnic language, Batak. According to Tobing's father, BMG Indonesia had been informed about this during the parents' interview with BMG when she advanced to the finals. It became big news when Octopus Record published her old record, The Song Of Joy, around the same time as the release of Terima Kasih, her Idol album, and during her dispute with Indomugi Pratama and BMG Indonesia. The Song of Joy was recorded from 1998 to 1999 but had not been released until September 2004. According to Octopus Record, they had asked permission from BMG to release Tobing's old records. They also offered to buy the recording master from BMG so there would be no competition, but BMG refused.

The incidents between some finalists and the show management, Indomugi Pratama, had occurred previously. One of the Top 4, Helena Andrian, canceled her contract and had to withdraw from the competition shortly before the grand final, causing her to be hastily expelled in the middle of the night from the apartment provided for the finalists. According to Adrian, around 2–3 weeks before the grand final, the finalists were suddenly asked to sign a new contract with new show management, Indomugi Pratama, with little time to consult or think about the contents, and little information was provided regarding their future management program. Among the clauses with which she disagreed were that all finalists were bound to Indomugi Pratama until three months after the grand final when Indomugi Pratama would then decide who would stay with them for the following three years. Afterward, Indomugi Pratama would continue to receive royalties for a total of 15 years.

== Discography ==
- Didia ("Where")
- Pada Kaki Salib-Mu ("At The Foot of Your Cross") with her sister, Jelita Tobing
- Praise & Worship (compilation)
- Wave Of Worship (compilation)
- Katakan Salahku
- Joy
- The Song Of Joy
- Indonesian Idol: Indonesian All-Time Hits (compilation)
- Terima Kasih ("Thank You", 2004)
- Rise (2005)
- Mujizat Itu Nyata ("The Miracle is True", 2006)
- Faithful (2008)

Preceded by	Indonesian Idol winner Joy Tobing (2004)	Succeeded by Mike Mohede
