= Indonesian Idol =

Indonesian singing competition

- Also known as: Indonesian Idol: Who's The Next? (season 3); Indonesian Idol: Be The Next (season 4); Indonesian Idol: Kebanggaan (season 5); Indonesian Idol: Be a Superstar (season 6); Indonesian Idol: A Decade of Dreams (season 8); Indonesian Idol Is Back (season 9); Indonesian Idol: Home of the Idols (season 10, 12–present); Indonesian Idol Special Season: A New Chapter (season 11)
- Genre: Reality television Talent show
- Created by: Simon Fuller
- Based on: Pop Idol
- Presented by: Current; Robby Purba; Enzy Storia; Former; Irgy Fahrezi; Atta; Daniel Mananta; Dewi Sandra; Sere Kalina; Boy William
- Judges: Current: Rossa; Maia Estianty; Judika; Bunga Citra Lestari; Soleh Solihun; Former: Titi DJ; Meuthia Kasim; Dimas Djayadiningrat; Indra Lesmana; Indy Barends; Jamie Aditya; Anang Hermansyah; Erwin Gutawa; Agnez Mo; Ari Lasso; Ahmad Dhani; Tantri Syalindri
- Theme music composer: Julian Gingell; Barry Stone; Cathy Dennis
- Country of origin: Indonesia
- Original language: Indonesian
- No. of seasons: 14
- No. of episodes: 346

Production
- Executive producers: Aurora Maris (2004–07); Yogi Hartarto (2004–08); Dada Soenardhi (2005); Muhammad Razief S (2006–08); Maria E. Febriyani (2010); Andrew Cam (2015–); Virgita Ruchiman (2012–); Fabian Dharmawan (2012–)
- Running time: 60–240 minutes
- Production companies: Fremantle (PT. Dunia Visitama Produksi); 19 Entertainment (Sony Pictures Television (uncredited))

Original release
- Network: RCTI
- Release: 9 April 2004 – present

Related
- Idol franchise American Idol; Pop Idol

Indonesian Idol is an Indonesian reality television singing competition created by Simon Fuller and produced by RCTI Production Team and FremantleMedia Asia. The show began airing on RCTI in March 2004 and became one of the most popular shows in the history of Indonesian television. Part of the Idol franchise, it was as a spin-off from the UK show Pop Idol.

The concept of the series is to find new solo recording artists where the winner is determined by the viewers. Through telephone calls, SMS text, and the RCTI+ app voting, viewers have chosen 13 winners to date: Joy Tobing, Mike Mohede, Ihsan Tarore, Rini Wulandari, Januarisman, Igo Pentury, Regina Ivanova, Nowela Auparay, Maria Simorangkir, Lyodra Ginting, Rimar Callista, Salma Salsabil, Shabrina Leanor, and Celyna Grace (listed in chronological order).

The series employs a panel of judges who critique the contestants' performances. The judges of the inaugural season were jazz musician Indra Lesmana, pop diva Titi DJ, radio personality Meuthia Kasim, and film director Dimas Djayadiningrat. The judging panels in the following seasons included TV hosts Indy Barends and Jamie Aditya, composer Erwin Gutawa, musicians Ahmad Dhani, Anang Hermansyah, and Maia Estianty; and singers Agnez Mo, Armand Maulana, Tantri Syalindri, Rossa, Ari Lasso, Bunga Citra Lestari, David Bayu, and Indonesian Idol season 2 runner-up Judika.

The show's inaugural season was hosted by radio DJ Atta and TV host Irgi Ahmad Fahrezy. In 2006, MTV Indonesia's VJ Daniel Mananta replaced Irgi as the main host, while singer Dewi Sandra replaced Atta in 2008, until Daniel Mananta became the sole host of the show in 2010–2012. In 2017, presenter Sere Kalina was added as a second host. In 2020, TV host, YouTuber, actor, and former VJ Boy William replaced Daniel Mananta as the sole host of the show. In 2026, a host position has changed again, this time was replaced by Robby Purba, TV host, actor, and former VJ who previously hosted a Syco-Fremantle talent search programs, namely X Factor Indonesia and Indonesia's Got Talent for third and fourth season.

The show has won several awards, including the 2005 and 2006 Panasonic Awards for the Best Music Variety Show. The show won over its popular rival singing competition show at the time, Akademi Fantasi Indosiar (known locally as AFI).

After the fifth season, the show was discontinued because of declining ratings before it resumed with its sixth season in 2010. The seventh season was held in 2012 and rapidly became the most successful season in the history of Indonesian Idol. Originally planned to be replaced by X Factor Indonesia in 2013, both shows were broadcast every alternate year. The show's rating declined again in 2014 which resulted in another discontinuation, when it was replaced by The Voice Indonesia. However, due to its low ratings, RCTI announced in June 2017 that Indonesian Idol would return after a three-year hiatus. The 13th season of the show premiered on Monday, 9 December 2024.

== Judges and hosts ==
The show originally had four judges, namely jazz musician Indra Lesmana, Indonesian pop singer Titi DJ, radio personality Meuthia Kasim, and film director Dimas Djayadiningrat. In season three, radio and television personality Indy Barends replaced Meuthia Kasim because of Meuthia's health. Indy stayed only for one season and left the show before season four. In season four, MTV video jockey, actor, and radio host Jamie Aditya replaced Indy Barends; and musician, singer, producer, and impresario Anang Hermansyah replaced Dimas Djay. In season five, Jamie left the panel, and only three judges—Indra, Titi, and Anang—were left. In 2010, Indra Lesmana and Titi DJ left the panel and were replaced by composer and conductor Erwin Gutawa and singer–actress Agnes Monica. Indonesian and Malaysian pop singer Rossa joined the panel to be the fourth judge. In 2012, Anang Hermansyah and Agnes Monica returned as judges, while a frontman of Dewa 19—musician, composer, and hits-maker music producer Ahmad Dhani—replaced Erwin Gutawa. In 2014, Titi DJ returned to the panel, while Agnes Monica left the panel and was replaced by singer and vocalist of Kotak Band Tantri Syalindri. Anang and Dhani returned as judges. In 2018, RCTI announced that all judges from last season would not be returning and the number of the panel was changed from four judges to five. Pop-rock singer and ex-frontman of Dewa 19, Ari Lasso; frontman of Gigi and songwriter Armand Maulana; music producer and musician Maia Estianty; actress and pop singer BCL, and the runner-up of Indonesian Idol season 2, Judika, were all set for the panel. For season 10, or "Idol X", all the judges from previous season returned, except for Armand, due to his duties on another talent show, who was replaced by a previous season's judge, Anang Hermansyah, after a hiatus of one season. In the 2020 season, BCL was replaced by pop singer Rossa, due to BCL's mental health after her husband's death in the same year. In the 2022 season, Maia and Ari were replaced by the judge exiting from the Special Season; BCL also rejoined the panel. The ex-frontman of Naif, David Bayu, was the new judge.

Guest judges may occasionally be introduced. In season one, the guest judge was pop singer Krisdayanti. In season two, musician, music producer, composer, and songwriter Yovie Widianto replaced Dimas Djay. Musician, composer, songwriter, and music producer Ahmad Dhani replaced Meuthia Kasim in the Any Cities audition. In season four, Titi DJ was replaced several times by comedian, actress, radio host, and singer Tika Panggabean in the Spectacular Show. In season six, singer, songwriter, music producer, composer, and music arranger Melly Goeslaw; Ahmad Dhani; frontman for ST 12 Charly van Houten; frontman for Ungu Pasha; and frontman for Gigi Armand Maulana were the guest judges in the Spectacular Show. Guest judges were used in the audition rounds in seasons five, six, and seven: such as singer Rio Febrian, Melly Goeslaw, singer and songwriter Nugie, and Yovie Widianto in season five and Melly Goeslaw, Ahmad Dhani, singer Hedi Yunus, pop-jazz singer Andien, and singer Nina Tamam in season seven.

The first two seasons were presented by Amelia Natasha (a.k.a. Ata) and Irgi Ahmad Fahrezy. Irgi quit after the second season and was replaced by Daniel Mananta. In the fifth season, Ata left the show and was replaced by RnB, dance, and pop singer Dewi Sandra. Since the sixth and seventh seasons, only Daniel Mananta was the host. In the eighth season, Pica Priscilla and Lolita Agustine acted as the backstage hosts. In the ninth and tenth seasons, Sere Kalina was also a host, with Daniel Mananta. In the eleventh season, actor, rapper, TV host, and YouTuber Boy William replaced Daniel Mananta as the host. However, when Boy William was tested positive for COVID-19 at the end of December 2020, until mid-January 2021, Daniel Mananta returned to be guest host. When Boy recovered, he hosted, together with Daniel, until Daniel left at end of January 2021. Boy was hosted until Season 13 in 2025. This season, Boy William is replace by X Factor Indonesia host, Robby Purba.

=== Presenters ===
Key: Current Previous

Presenters	Season														
Presenters	1	2	3	4	5	6	7	8	9	10	11	12	13	14	15
Robby Purba															
Enzy Storia															
Irgy Fahrezi															
Atta															
Daniel Mananta															
Dewi Sandra															
Lolita Agustine															
Pica Priscilla															
Sere Kalina															
Boy William															

=== Judges ===
Key: Current Previous

Judges	Season														
Judges	1	2	3	4	5	6	7	8	9	10	11	12	13	14	15
Judika															
Rossa															
Bunga Citra Lestari															
Maia Estianty															
Soleh Solihun															
Meuthia Kasim															
Dimas Djayadiningrat															
Indra Lesmana															
Titi DJ															
Indy Barends															
Jamie Aditya															
Anang Hermansyah															
Erwin Gutawa															
Agnes Monica															
Ahmad Dhani															
Tantri Syalindri															
Armand Maulana															
Ari Lasso															
David Bayu															

== Winners & Runner-ups ==
=== Winners ===
Season	Contestant	Audition City	Hometown	Date		Age of Coronation	Winning song (Composer)	Debut album
Season	Contestant	Audition City	Hometown	Birth	Coronation	Age of Coronation	Winning song (Composer)	Debut album
1 (2004)	Joy Tobing (Note: Later, Joy broke her contract with Fremantle Media and Indonesian Idol. As a result, her place as the winner was granted to runner-up, Delon Thamrin.)	Jakarta		20 March 1980	4 September 2004	24 years 5 months 15 days	"Karena Cinta" (Glenn Fredly)	Terima Kasih
2 (2005)	Mike Mohede †	Jakarta		7 November 1983	14 August 2005	21 years 9 months 7 days	"Semua Untuk Cinta" (Hendy Irvan)	Mike
3 (2006)	Ihsan Tarore	Medan		20 August 1989	19 August 2006	16 years 11 months 30 days	"Kemenangan Hati" (Yovie Widianto)	The Winner
4 (2007)	Rini Wulandari	Medan		28 April 1990	28 July 2007	17 years 3 months	"Aku Tetap Milikmu" (Anton BHS)	Aku Tetap Milikmu
5 (2008)	Januarisman	Jakarta		26 January 1986	2 August 2008	22 years 6 months 8 days	"Harapkan Sempurna" (Yogi Hartarto)	Ajari Aku
6 (2010)	Igo Pentury	Ambon		19 February 1993	7 August 2010	17 years 5 months 19 days	"Kemenangan Cinta" (Anang Hermansyah)	Terima Kasih
7 (2012)	Regina Ivanova	Jakarta		4 December 1986	7 July 2012	25 years 7 months 3 days	"Kemenangan" (Ahmad Dhani)	Kemenangan
8 (2014)	Nowela Auparay	Purwokerto and Bandung	Wamena	19 December 1987	23 May 2014	26 years 5 months 4 days	"Membawa Cinta" (Harry Budiman)	1
9 (2018)	Maria Simorangkir	Medan		7 October 2001	23 April 2018	16 years 6 months 16 days	"Yang Terbaik" (Abdul & The Coffee Theory)	Maria Simorangkir
10 (2020)	Lyodra Ginting	Medan		21 June 2003	2 March 2020	16 years 8 months 17 days	"Gemintang Hatiku" (Laleilmanino)	Lyodra
11 (2021)	Rimar Callista	Jakarta	Tangerang	18 January 1997	26 April 2021	24 years 3 months 8 days	"Waktu dan Perhatian" (Andmesh Kamaleng)	–
12 (2023)	Salma Salsabil	Yogyakarta	Probolinggo	12 February 2002	22 May 2023	21 years 3 months 10 days	"Menghargai Kata Rindu" (Mario G. Klau)	Berharap Pada Timur
13 (2025)	Shabrina Leanor (Note: birth name: Shabrina Leonita)	Jakarta	Manggar	23 July 2000	19 May 2025	24 years 9 months 25 days	"Pendampingmu #TahtaHatiku" (Yovie Widianto, Arsy Widianto)	TBA
14 (2026)	Celyna Grace (Note: birth name: Gracelyn Jessica)	Semarang		3 November 2007	25 May 2026	18 years 6 months 24 days	"Sumpah Mati" (Happy Andromeda, Mahalini Raharja, Giant Prayash, Andi Rianto)	TBA

=== Runner-ups ===
Season	Contestant	Audition City	Hometown	Date		Age of Coronation	Winning song (Composer)	Debut album
Season	Contestant	Audition City	Hometown	Birth	Coronation	Age of Coronation	Winning song (Composer)	Debut album
1 (2004)	Delon Thamrin	Jakarta	Jakarta	20 May 1978	4 September 2004	26 years 3 months 15 days	–	Bahagiaku
2 (2005)	Judika Sihotang	Jakarta	Sidikalang	31 August 1978	14 August 2005	26 years 11 months 14 days	–	One
3 (2006)	Dirly Sompie	Manado and Surabaya	Manado	10 December 1989	19 August 2006	16 years 8 months 9 days	"Kemenangan Hati" (Yovie Widianto)	Menggapai Mimpi
4 (2007)	Wilson Maiseka	Ambon and Surabaya	Ambon	24 August 1989	28 July 2007	17 years 11 months 4 days	–	–
5 (2008)	Gisella Anastasia	Surabaya		16 November 1990	2 August 2008	17 years 8 months 17 days	–	–
6 (2010)	Citra Scholastika	Yogyakarta		5 June 1994	7 August 2010	16 years 2 months 2 days	"Kemenangan Cinta" (Anang Hermansyah)	Pasti Bisa
7 (2012)	Kamasean Matthews	Jakarta	Jakarta	30 June 1995	7 July 2012	17 years 7 days	–	–
8 (2014)	Husein Alatas	Jakarta	Tangerang	5 July 1989	23 May 2014	24 years 10 months 18 days	"Membawa Cinta" (Harry Budiman)	–
9 (2018)	Ahmad Abdul	Surabaya	Kupang	31 May 1993	23 April 2018	24 years 10 months 23 days	"Yang Terbaik" (Abdul & The Coffee Theory)	–
10 (2020)	Tiara Anugrah	Surabaya	Jember	23 September 2001	2 March 2020	18 years 5 months 15 days	"Gemintang Hatiku" (Laleilmanino)	Tiara Andini
11 (2021)	Mark Natama	Jakarta	Medan	20 April 2001	26 April 2021	20 years 6 days	–	Bachelor of Romance
12 (2023)	Nabilah Taqqiyah	Jakarta	Banda Aceh	21 November 2005	22 May 2023	17 years 6 months 1 day	"Menghargai Kata Rindu" (Mario G. Klau)	Kekal Yang Sementara
13 (2025)	Fajar Noor (Note: birth name: Fajar Nurdiansyah)	Medan		23 May 2004	19 May 2025	20 years 11 months 26 days	"Tahta Hatiku #Pendampingmu" (Yovie Widianto, Arsy Widianto)	Sementara, Selamanya
14 (2026)	Niki Becker (Note: birth name: Nikita Becker)	Yogyakarta	Bekasi	25 September 2003	25 May 2026	22 years 8 months	"Sumpah Mati" (Happy Andromeda, Mahalini Raharja, Giant Prayash, Andi Rianto)	TBA

=== Based on Hometown ===
Island	Province	City (Note: birthplace)	Winner				Runner-up			
Island	Province	City	Man		Woman		Man		Woman	
Island	Province	City	Season	Contestant	Season	Contestant	Season	Contestant	Season	Contestant
Sumatera	Aceh	Banda Aceh							12 (2023)	Nabilah Taqqiyah
Sumatera	North Sumatra	Medan	3 (2006)	Ihsan Tarore	4 (2007)	Rini Wulandari	11 (2021)	Mark Natama (Note: origin town from Jakarta)		
Sumatera	North Sumatra	Medan			9 (2018)	Maria Simorangkir	13 (2025)	Fajar Noor (Note: birth name: Fajar Nurdiansyah)		
Sumatera	North Sumatra	Medan			10 (2020)	Lyodra Ginting				
Sumatera	North Sumatra	Sidikalang					2 (2005)	Judika Sihotang		
Sumatera	Bangka Belitung Islands	Manggar			13 (2025)	Shabrina Leanor (Note: birth name: Shabrina Leonita)				
Java	Banten	Tangerang			11 (2021)	Rimar Callista	8 (2014)	Husein Alatas		
Java	Jakarta	Jakarta	2 (2005)	Mike Mohede †	1 (2004)	Joy Tobing	1 (2004)	Delon Thamrin	7 (2012)	Kamasean Matthews
Java	Jakarta	Jakarta	5 (2008)	Januarisman	7 (2012)	Regina Ivanova				
Java	West Java	Bekasi							14 (2026)	Niki Becker (Note: birth name: Nikita Becker)
Java	Central Java	Semarang			14 (2026)	Celyna Grace (Note: birth name: Gracelyn Jessica)				
Java	Yogyakarta	Yogyakarta							6 (2010)	Citra Scholastika
Java	East Java	Surabaya							5 (2008)	Gisella Anastasia
Java	East Java	Jember							10 (2020)	Tiara Anugrah
Java	East Java	Probolinggo			12 (2023)	Salma Salsabil				
Bali and Nusa Tenggara	East Nusa Tenggara	Kupang					9 (2018)	Ahmad Abdul (Note: origin town from Denpasar)		
Sulawesi	North Sulawesi	Manado					3 (2006)	Dirly Sompie		
Ambon	Ambon	Ambon	6 (2010)	Igo Pentury			4 (2007)	Wilson Maiseka		
Papua	Highland Papua	Wamena			8 (2014)	Nowela Auparay (Note: origin town from Purwokerto)				

=== Based on Age ===
Age (Note: stated at win of contest.)			Winner				Runner-up			
Age			Man		Woman		Man		Woman	
Years	Month(s)	Day(s)	Season	Contestant	Season	Contestant	Season	Contestant	Season	Contestant
16	2	2							6 (2010)	Citra Scholastika
16	6	16			9 (2018)	Maria Simorangkir				
16	8	9					3 (2006)	Dirly Sompie		
16	8	17			10 (2020)	Lyodra Ginting				
16	11	30	3 (2006)	Ihsan Tarore						
17	0	7							7 (2012)	Kamasean Matthews
17	3	0			4 (2007)	Rini Wulandari				
17	5	19	6 (2010)	Igo Pentury						
17	6	1							12 (2023)	Nabilah Taqqiyah
17	8	17							5 (2008)	Gisella Anastasia
17	11	4					4 (2007)	Wilson Maiseka		
18	5	15							10 (2020)	Tiara Anugrah
18	6	24			14 (2026)	Celyna Grace (Note: birth name: Gracelyn Jessica)				
20	0	6					11 (2021)	Mark Natama		
20	11	26					13 (2025)	Fajar Noor (Note: birth name: Fajar Nurdiansyah)		
21	3	10			12 (2023)	Salma Salsabil				
21	9	7	2 (2005)	Mike Mohede †						
22	6	8	5 (2008)	Januarisman						
22	8	0							14 (2026)	Niki Becker (Note: birth name: Nikita Becker)
24	3	8			11 (2021)	Rimar Callista				
24	5	15			1 (2004)	Joy Tobing				
24	9	25			13 (2025)	Shabrina Leanor (Note: birth name: Shabrina Leonita)				
24	10	18					8 (2014)	Husein Alatas		
24	10	23					9 (2018)	Ahmad Abdul		
25	7	3			7 (2012)	Regina Ivanova				
26	3	15					1 (2004)	Delon Thamrin		
26	5	4			8 (2014)	Nowela Auparay				
26	11	14					2 (2005)	Judika Sihotang		

== Statistics ==
=== TOP5s' results ===
Season	Winner		Runner-up		3rd Place		4th Place		5th Place	
Season	Contestant	Bottom vote (Note: only counted from start of spectacular show.) (Note: only counted until before enter TOP 3)	Contestant	Bottom vote	Contestant	Bottom vote	Contestant	Bottom vote	Contestant	Bottom vote
1 (2004)	Joy Tobing	1	Delon Thamrin	2	Nania Yusuf	–	Helena Andrian	4	Michael Jakarimilena	4
2 (2005)	Mike Mohede †	2	Judika Sihotang	–	Firman Siagian	1	Monita Tahalea	3	Harry Mantong	4
3 (2006)	Ihsan Tarore	3	Dirly Sompie	3	Ghea Oktarin	1	Sanobo Sasamu	2	Maria Priscilla	2
4 (2007)	Rini Wulandari	1	Wilson Maiseka	1	Gabriela Christy	1	Sarah Hadju	5	Fandy Santoso	1
5 (2008)	Januarisman	3	Gisella Anastasia	3	Patudu Syammayim	4	Aji Wibisono	3	Dyna Fransisca	3
6 (2010)	Igo Pentury	4	Citra Scholastika	2	Gilang Saputra	5	Ray Generies	2	Tesa Novliana	3
7 (2012)	Regina Ivanova	–	Kamasean Matthews	1	Prattyoda Bhayangkara	2	Dionisius Agung	2	Febri Yoga	4
8 (2014)	Nowela Auparay	–	Husein Alatas	3	Di Muhammad Devirzha	–	Yuka Tamada	3	Yusuf Nur Ubay	3
9 (2018)	Maria Simorangkir	2	Ahmad Abdul	2	Joanita Veroni	2	Ayu Putrisundari	4	Ghea Indrawari	1
10 (2020)	Lyodra Ginting	1	Tiara Anugrah	1	Ziva Magnolya	3	Raja Giannuca	2	Mahalini Raharja	3
11 (2021)	Rimar Callista	3	Mark Natama	–	Anggi Marito	1	Melisa Hartanto	2	Jemimah Cita	5
12 (2023)	Salma Salsabil	–	Nabilah Taqqiyah	–	Rony Parulian	5	Nyoman Paul	4	Raisa Syarla	2
13 (2025)	Shabrina Leanor (Note: birth name: Shabrina Leonita)	1	Fajar Noor (Note: birth name: Fajar Nurdiansyah)	1	Mesa Hira (Note: birth name: Meisya Syahirah)	3	Vanessa Zee (Note: birth name: Vanessa Simorangkir)	3	Angie Carvalho (Note: birth name: Angelina Carvalho)	3
14 (2026)	Celyna Grace (Note: birth name: Gracelyn Jessica)	1	Niki Becker (Note: birth name: Nikita Becker)	2	Rio Lahskart (Note: birth name: Satrio Lahskart)	3	Meidra (Note: birth name: Meidra Aljuwi)	5	Josh Flo (Note: birth name: Florentino Joshua)	3
15 (TBA)

=== Last-standing' Contestants ===
Season	Man						Woman					
Season	1st		2nd		3rd		1st		2nd		3rd	
1 (2004)	2nd	Delon Thamrin	5th	Michael Jakarimilena	6th	Lucky Oktavian	1st	Joy Tobing	3rd	Nania Yusuf	4th	Helena Andrian
2 (2005) (Note: All woman last-standing' contestants were all woman contestants)	1st	Mike Mohede †	2nd	Judika Sihotang	3rd	Firman Siagian	4th	Monita Tahalea	6th	Maya Damayanti	9th	Vira Puspitasari
3 (2006)	1st	Ihsan Tarore	2nd	Dirly Sompie	4th	Sanobo Sasamu	3rd	Ghea Oktarin	5th	Maria Priscilla	7th	Christy Claudia
4 (2007)	2nd	Wilson Maiseka	5th	Fandy Santoso	6th	Dimas Mochammad	1st	Rini Wulandari	3rd	Gabriela Christy	4th	Sarah Hadju
5 (2008)	1st	Januarisman	3rd	Patudu Syammayim	4th	Aji Wibisono	2nd	Gisella Anastasia	5th	Dyna Fransisca	8th	Ibeth Estrya
6 (2010)	1st	Igo Pentury	3rd	Gilang Saputra	4th	Ray Generies	2nd	Citra Scholastika	5th	Atresye Toumahuw	8th	Keyko Vredhe
7 (2012)	3rd	Prattyoda Bhayangkara	4th	Dionisius Agung	5th	Febri Yoga	1st	Regina Ivanova	2nd	Kamasean Matthews	6th	Maria Rosalia
8 (2014)	2nd	Husein Alatas	3rd	Di Muhammad Devirzha	5th	Yusuf Nur Ubay	1st	Nowela Auparay	4th	Yuka Tamada	7th	Windy Yunita
9 (2018)	2nd	Ahmad Abdul	8th	Glen Samuel	9th	Chandra Wahyudi	1st	Maria Simorangkir	3rd	Joanita Veroni	4th	Ayu Putrisundari
10 (2020)	4th	Raja Giannuca	10th	Samuel Cipta	11th	Richard Jeremy	1st	Lyodra Ginting	2nd	Tiara Anugrah	3rd	Ziva Magnolya
11 (2021)	2nd	Mark Natama	6th	Azhardi Athariq	9th	Kelvin Joshua	1st	Rimar Callista	3rd	Anggi Marito	4th	Melisa Hartanto
12 (2023)	3rd	Rony Parulian	4th	Nyoman Paul	7th	Neyl Author	1st	Salma Salsabil	2nd	Nabilah Taqqiyah	5th	Raisa Syarla
13 (2025)	2nd	Fajar Noor (Note: birth name: Fajar Nurdiansyah)	6th	Piche Kota (Note: birth name: Petrus Kota)	7th	Kenriz (Note: birth name: Kenko Rizqullah)	1st	Shabrina Leanor (Note: birth name: Shabrina Leonita)	3rd	Mesa Hira (Note: birth name: Meisya Syahirah)	4th	Vanessa Zee (Note: birth name: Vanessa Simorangkir)
14 (2026)	3rd	Rio Lahskart (Note: birth name: Satrio Lahskart)	5th	Josh Flo (Note: birth name: Florentino Joshua)	6th	Ecky (Note: birth name: Muhammad Nurhidayatullah)	1st	Celyna Grace (Note: birth name: Gracelyn Jessica)	2nd	Niki Becker (Note: birth name: Nikita Becker)	4th	Meidra (Note: birth name: Meidra Aljuwi)
15 (TBA)

=== Oldest and Youngest' contestants ===
Season	Oldest						Youngest					
Season	Man			Woman			Man			Woman		
Season	Rank	Contestant	Birthdate	Rank	Contestant	Birthdate	Rank	Contestant	Birthdate	Rank	Contestant	Birthdate
1 (2004)	2nd (Note: the highest rank)	Delon Thamrin	20 May 1978 (Note: the oldest of all contestants)	1st	Joy Tobing	20 March 1980	7th	Bona Sardo	17 January 1984	8th	Karen Pooroe	12 November 1987 (Note: the youngest of all contestants)
2 (2005)	2nd	Judika Sihotang	31 August 1978	6th	Maya Damayanti	30 August 1983	12th	Danar Indra	5 September 1985	4th	Monita Tahalea	21 July 1987
3 (2006)	4th	Sanobo Sasamu	3 May 1980	8th	Sisi Hapsari	1 November 1984	1st	Ihsan Tarore	20 August 1989	7th	Christy Podung	11 December 1989
4 (2007)	5th	Fandy Santoso	26 April 1985	4th	Sarah Hadju	25 May 1980	2nd	Wilson Maiseka	24 August 1989	10th	Marsya Nada	14 March 1991
5 (2008)	7th	Andy Makarawung	9 February 1982	11th	Della Setia	8 August 1982	9th	Dedeh Richo	22 September 1989	12th	Safira Rachma	1 March 1991
6 (2010)	14th (Note: the lowest rank)	Andi Subagja	12 October 1984	9th	Diana Tumewa	19 June 1985	1st	Igo Pentury	19 February 1993	2nd	Citra Scholastika	5 June 1994
7 (2012)	4th	Dionisius Agung	30 April 1986	1st	Regina Ivanova	4 December 1986	9th	Rio Agung	19 July 1994	2nd	Kamasean Matthews	30 June 1995
8 (2014)	6th	Giofanny Elliandrian	16 May 1988	9th	Yunita Nursetia	17 April 1987	5th	Yusuf Nur Ubay	29 March 1996	10th	Dewi Puspita	24 March 1997
9 (2018)	2nd	Ahmad Abdul	31 May 1993	7th	Bianca Jodie	30 March 1996	10th	Kevin Aprilio	12 April 2000	1st	Maria Simorangkir	7 October 2001
10 (2020)	13th	Ola Elannor	9 July 1995	14th	Olivia Pardede	19 October 1992	10th	Samuel Cipta	1 May 2003	1st	Lyodra Ginting	21 June 2003
11 (2021)	11th	Ramanda Almuna	22 September 1995	4th	Melisa Hartanto	12 July 1994	6th	Azhardi Athariq	3 September 2002	7th	Kirana Anandita	13 September 2003
12 (2023)	7th	Neyl Author	2 July 1996	13th	Rosalina Samosir	30 May 1999	11th	Alfredo Fernando	22 August 2004	14th	Rachel Olivia	26 January 2006
13 (2025)	7th	Kenriz (Note: birth name: Kenko Rizqullah)	17 September 2001	1st	Shabrina Leanor (Note: birth name: Shabrina Leonita)	23 July 2000	11th	Axelo (Note: birth name: Axel Nababan)	23 July 2006	9th	Shakirra Vier (Note: birth name: Shakirra Vierny)	22 November 2008
14 (2026)	8th	Dandy Panjawi (Note: birth name: Andi Panjawi)	13 February 1999	4th	Meidra (Note: birth name: Meidra Aljuwi)	28 May 2000	14th	Arrul Munyenyo (Note: birth name: Arrul Erwandy)	3 February 2005	13th	Aruna (Note: birth name: Farras Nurrana)	28 July 2009
15 (TBA)

=== Standing Ovation(s) ===
Season	Most			Least			High Average								
Season	Most			Least			1st			2nd			3rd		
Season	Rank	Contestant	Time(s) (Note: counted from start of showcase.)	Rank	Contestant	Time(s)	Rank	Contestant	Points (shows)	Rank	Contestant	Points (shows)	Rank	Contestant	Points (shows)
9 (2018)	1st	Maria Simorangkir	69	9th	Chandra Wahyudi	0	1st	Maria Simorangkir	2,65 (26)	2nd	Ahmad Abdul	2,46 (26)	4th	Ayu Putrisundari	1,56 (16)
9 (2018)	1st	Maria Simorangkir	69	11th	Whitney Julinetha	0	1st	Maria Simorangkir	2,65 (26)	2nd	Ahmad Abdul	2,46 (26)	4th	Ayu Putrisundari	1,56 (16)
9 (2018)	1st	Maria Simorangkir	69	12th	Mona Magang	0	1st	Maria Simorangkir	2,65 (26)	2nd	Ahmad Abdul	2,46 (26)	4th	Ayu Putrisundari	1,56 (16)
10 (2020)	1st	Lyodra Ginting	69	10th	Samuel Cipta	0	8th	Novia Bachmid	2,90 (10)	1st	Lyodra Ginting	2,88 (24)	2nd	Tiara Anugrah	2,42 (24)
10 (2020)	1st	Lyodra Ginting	69	13th	Ola Elannor	0	8th	Novia Bachmid	2,90 (10)	1st	Lyodra Ginting	2,88 (24)	2nd	Tiara Anugrah	2,42 (24)
10 (2020)	1st	Lyodra Ginting	69	15th	Alda Wiyekedella	0	8th	Novia Bachmid	2,90 (10)	1st	Lyodra Ginting	2,88 (24)	2nd	Tiara Anugrah	2,42 (24)
11 (2021)	1st	Rimar Callista	90	10th	Femila Sinukaban	2	1st	Rimar Callista	3,60 (25)	8th	Fitri Novianti	2,63 (8)	3rd	Anggi Marito	2,56 (18)
12 (2023)	1st	Salma Salsabil	92	12th	Danil Pratama	0	1st	Salma Salsabil	3,68 (25)	7th	Neyl Author	2,50 (12)	6th	Novia Situmeang	2,14 (14)
13 (2025)	1st	Shabrina Leanor (Note: birth name: Shabrina Leonita)	73	12th	Ardhitio (Note: birth name: Tio Ardhana)	0	5th	Angie Carvalho (Note: birth name: Angelina Carvalho)	3,33 (15)	1st	Shabrina Leanor	2,80 (26)	2nd	Fajar Noor (Note: birth name: Fajar Nurdiansyah)	2,76 (26)
14 (2026)	3rd	Rio Lahskart (Note: birth name: Satrio Lahskart)	49	9th	Arrcely (Note: birth name: Aracely Ervina)	0	3rd	Rio Lahskart	2,23 (22)	2nd	Niki Becker (Note: birth name: Nikita Becker)	1,53 (30)	1st	Celyna Grace (Note: birth name: Gracelyn Jessica)	1,27 (30)
14 (2026)	3rd	Rio Lahskart	49	13th	Aruna (Note: birth name: Farras Nurrana)	0	3rd	Rio Lahskart	2,23 (22)	2nd	Niki Becker	1,53 (30)	1st	Celyna Grace	1,27 (30)
14 (2026)	3rd	Rio Lahskart	49	14th	Arrul Munyenyo (Note: birth name: Arrul Erwandy)	0	3rd	Rio Lahskart	2,23 (22)	2nd	Niki Becker	1,53 (30)	1st	Celyna Grace	1,27 (30)
14 (2026)	3rd	Rio Lahskart	49	15th	Praditya (Note: birth name: Aditya Prayoga)	0	3rd	Rio Lahskart	2,23 (22)	2nd	Niki Becker	1,53 (30)	1st	Celyna Grace	1,27 (30)
15 (TBA)

== Selection process ==
In a series of eliminations, the show selects the eventual winner out of many tens of thousands of contestants.

=== Auditions ===
There are 2 rounds of auditions which usually take place in large convention halls where thousands of people waited in line. The first-round judges are the Sony BMG people. Those who passed the first round of auditions continued to audition in front of the main judges. Contestants are required to sing a cappella, with poor singers often facing intense and humbling criticism from the judges. Typically, the judges express disgust or dismay or suppress laughter. Those who impress the majority of the judges, move on to the elimination round, which takes place in Jakarta. Usually only 150 to 170 contestants get through to the elimination round in Jakarta.

Contestants have to be Indonesian citizens. For the first season, contestants were required to be between the ages of 18 and 24 years old. To increase variety, in the second and third season the age requirement was lowered from 18 to 16 and the upper age limit was raised from 24 to 28. As a result, there were many teenagers that made it to the final 12, such as Monita and Vira in the second season, and also Tesa, Brinet, Christy, Ihsan, Gea, and Dirly in the third season. In the fifth season, the eligible age-range for contestants was from 17 to 29.

=== Elimination round ===
There are 3 elimination rounds. In the first elimination round, 170 contestants from around Indonesia are separated into 17 groups of 10 contestants eacj. In the second elimination round, male and female contestants are paired and sing duets. In the last elimination round the remaining contestants sing their choice of song, alone in front of the judges. The judges then inform them whether they have made it onto the stage show or not.

=== Workshop round ===
==== Season 1 ====
In the first season, 30 contestants were separated in groups of 10, and every week three contestants from each group were chosen for the Top 10 or The Spectacular Show. Audiences voted their favorites by SMS texting and Premium Calls. After 9 contestants were chosen, there was a wild card round. Only one contestant from the Wild Card round could join the 9 contestants at the Spectacular Show. Karen Theresia Pooroe won the most audience votes, advancing to the Top 10. Although the Spectacular Show was supposed to have a set of 10 contestants, the judges announced at the last minute that they would be advancing a second wild card, an eleventh, contestant, Lucky Octavian, as well.

==== Season 2 ====
In the second season, there was no Wild Card round. 24 contestants were separated into groups of 8. Every week, 4 contestants were picked to move on to the Top 12.

==== Season 3 ====
In the third season, the Workshop stage consisted of three rounds, each, for male and female contestants. There were 28 contestants that made it to the Workshop stage in the first week, with eight contestants (four males and four females) being sent home. Six contestants (three males and three females) were sent home in the second week, and the final Workshop eliminated four more contestants (two males and two females). Before the Spectacular round, a pre-gala and wild-card show was held. Four of the eliminated contestants were chosen by the judges and two of them, one male and one female, were given a place in the Spectacular Show based on the result of an audience vote.

==== Season 6 ====
The sixth season saw several changes to the format of the show. There were 14 finalists, instead of 12. In the Workshop round, 24 semi-finalists were divided into 2 groups. Each consisted of 6 males and 6 females. Four contestants from each group got voted off in the first and second weeks, and two in the third, fourth, and fifth weeks, resulting in the Top 10 contestants, who filled 10 of 14 spots in the Spectacular Show. The judges selected 8 of the previously eliminated 14 semi-finalists to compete in the Wild Card round. Two contestants were picked based on votes by the audience, while the other two were selected by the judges. An additional four contestants (two males and two females) advanced to the final group of 14.

=== Spectacular Show ===
In the Spectacular Show stage, which continues over eleven weeks, each finalist performs a song live (two in the top 4 and top 3 and three in the finale) in prime time, with a weekly theme, at the Balai Sarbini Concert Hall in Jakarta, in front of live audiences. Unlike American Idol, Indonesian Idol's Result Show is conducted about 1-hour after the Spectacular Show. The Result Show is conducted 7 days after the Grand Finale. In the Result Show, some finalists who get the fewest votes are put in the bottom three or bottom two. Each week, the finalist with the fewest votes is sent home. This process is repeated each week until the one remaining contestant is declared the winner.

Indonesian Idol's famous sentence announcing the result is Indonesia Memilih! (Indonesia has chosen!/Indonesia voted...), along with a 1-minute pause and, at last, the result. Every season, the two remaining finalists in the Grand Finale sing a new single for the Winner's Record. The song is to be recorded on the winner's album.

== Season contestants ==
=== Season 1-5 ===
Indonesian Idol
Indonesian Idol finalists (with dates of elimination)
Type		season 1 (2004)		season 2 (2005)		season 3 (2006)		season 4 (2007)		season 5 (2008)	
Grand Final		Joy Tobing	Winner	Mike Mohede	Winner	Ihsan Tarore	Winner	Rini Wulandari	Winner	Januarisman	Winner
Grand Final		Delon Thamrin	Runner-up	Judika Sihotang	Runner-up	Dirly Sompie	Runner-up	Wilson Maiseka	Runner-up	Gisella Anastasia	Runner-up
Road to Grand Final		Nania Yusuf	3rd Place	Firman Siagian	3rd Place	Ghea Oktarin	3rd Place	Gabriela Christy	3rd Place	Patudu Syammayim	3rd Place
Spectacular Show	IX	–		Monita Tahalea	23 July	Sanobo Sasamu	28 July	Sarah Hadju	6 July	Aji Wibisono	11 July
Spectacular Show	VIII	–		Harry Mantong	16 July	Maria Priscilla	21 July	Fandy Santoso	29 June	Dyna Fransisca	4 July
Spectacular Show	VII	Helena Andrian	14 August	Maya Damayanti	9 July	Ilham Basso	14 July	Dimas Mochammad	22 June	Obet Ronald Habibu	27 June
Spectacular Show	VI	Michael Jakarimilena	7 August	Glenn Waas	2 July	Christy Claudia	7 July	Julian Syahputra	15 June	Andy Makawurung	20 June
Spectacular Show	V	Lucky Oktavian	31 July	Yudi Manupassa	24 June	Sisi Hapsari	30 June	Priska Paramita	8 June	Ibeth Estrya	13 June
Spectacular Show	IV	Bona Sardo	24 July	Vira Puspitasari	18 June	Brinet Sudjana	23 June	Stevano Andrie	1 June	Dede Richo	6 June
Spectacular Show	III	Karen Pooroe	17 July	Wisnu Prabowo	11 June	Martesa Sumendra	16 June	Marsya Nada	25 May	Tifany Florina	30 May
Spectacular Show	II	Winda Viska	10 July	Ronald Silitonga	4 June	Lee Kulalean	9 June	Gana Eka	18 May	Della Setia	23 May
Spectacular Show	I	Suci Wulandari	3 July	Danar Indra	28 May	Elisabeth Depe	2 June	Rismawati	11 May	Safira Rizkika	16 May
Spectacular Show	I	Adika Pratama	3 July	Danar Indra	28 May	Elisabeth Depe	2 June	Rismawati	11 May	Safira Rizkika	16 May

=== Season 6-10 ===
Indonesian Idol
Indonesian Idol finalists (with dates of elimination)
Type		season 6 (2010)		season 7 (2012)		season 8 (2014)		season 9 (2018)		season 10 (2019–20)	
Grand Final		Igo Pentury	Winner	Regina Ivanova	Winner	Nowela Auparay	Winner	Maria Simorangkir	Winner	Lyodra Ginting	Winner
Grand Final		Citra Scholastika	Runner-up	Kamasean Matthews	Runner-up	Husein Alatas	Runner-up	Ahmad Abdul	Runner-up	Tiara Anugrah	Runner-up
Road to Grand Final		Gilang Saputra	3rd Place	Prattyoda; Bhayangkara	3rd Place	Di Muhammad; Devirzha	3rd Place	Joanita Veroni	3rd Place	Ziva Magnolya	3rd Place
Spectacular Show	XII	–		–		–		–		Raja Giannuca	10 February
Spectacular Show	XI	–		–		–		–		Mahalini Raharja	3 February
Spectacular Show	X	Ray Generies	16 July	–		–		–		Mirabeth Sonia	27 January
Spectacular Show	IX	Atresye Toumahuw	9 July	Dionisius Agung	16 June	Yuka Tamada	2 May	Ayu Putrisundari	26 March	Ainun Irsani	20 January
Spectacular Show	VIII	Windra Elfi	2 July	Febri Yoga	9 June	Yusuf Nur Ubay	25 April	Ghea Indrawari	19 March	Novia Bachmid	13 January
Spectacular Show	VII	Rio Basir	25 June	Maria Rosalia	25 May	Giofanny Elliandrian	18 April	Marion Jola	12 March	Agseisa Galuh	6 January
Spectacular Show	VI	Keyko Vredhe	18 June	Non Dera	18 May	Windy Yunita	4 April	Bianca Jodie	5 March	Samuel Cipta	23 December
Spectacular Show	V	Diana Tumewa	12 June	Rosandy Nugroho	11 May	Maesarah Nurzaka	28 March	Glen Samuel	26 February	Richard Jeremy	16 December
Spectacular Show	IV	Fendi	4 June	Rio Agung	4 May	Yunita Nursetia	21 March	Chandra Wahyudi	19 February	Keisya Levronka	9 December
Spectacular Show	III	Dea Larasati	28 May	Ivan Saputra	27 April	Miranti Yassovi	14 March	Kevin Aprillo	13 February	Ola Elannor	2 December
Spectacular Show	III	Dea Larasati	28 May	Ivan Saputra	27 April	Dewi Puspita	14 March	Kevin Aprillo	13 February	Ola Elannor	2 December
Spectacular Show	II	Mona Lengkong	21 May	Belinda Fueza	20 April	Ryan De Angga	28 February	Withney Julinetha	6 February	Olivia Pardede	25 November
Spectacular Show	II	Ica Intifada	21 May	Belinda Fueza	20 April	Ryan De Angga	28 February	Withney Julinetha	6 February	Olivia Pardede	25 November
Spectacular Show	I	Andi Subagja	14 May	Khanza Dinar	13 April	Martinha Tereza	21 February	Mona Magang	30 January	Alda Wiyekedella	18 November

=== Season 11-14 ===
Indonesian Idol
Indonesian Idol finalists (with dates of elimination)
Type		season 11 (2021)		season 12 (2023)		season 13 (2025)		season 14 (2026)		season 15 (TBA)
Grand Final		Rimar Callista	Winner	Salma Salsabil	Winner	Shabrina Leonita	Winner	Gracelyn Jessica	Winner	
Grand Final		Mark Natama	Runner-up	Nabilah Taqqiyah	Runner-up	Fajar Nurdiansyah	Runner-up	Nikita Becker	Runner-up	
Road to Grand Final		Anggi Marito	3rd Place	Rony Parulian	3rd Place	Meisya Syahirah	3rd Place	Satrio Lahskart	3rd Place	
Spectacular Show	XII	–		–		–		Meidra Aljuwi	4 May	
Spectacular Show	XI	–		Nyoman Paul	1 May	Vanessa Simorangkir	28 April	Florentino Joshua	27 April	
Spectacular Show	X	Melisa Hartanto	22 March	Raisa Syarla	10 April	Angelina Carvalho	21 April	Muhammad Nurhidayatullah	20 April	
Spectacular Show	IX	Jemimah Cita	15 March	Novia Situmeang	3 April	Petrus Kota	24 March	Kezia Famdale	13 April	
Spectacular Show	VIII	Azhardi Athariq	8 March	Neyl Author	27 March	Kenko Rizqullah	17 March	Andi Panjawi	6 April	
Spectacular Show	VII	Kirana Anandita	1 March	Anggis Devaki	20 March	Queenara Sudirman	10 March	Aracely Evina	30 March	
Spectacular Show	VI	Fitri Novianti	22 February	Dimansyah Laitupa	13 March	Shakirra Vierny	3 March	Regine Keiko	9 March	
Spectacular Show	V	Kelvin Joshua	15 February	Rahman Sadli	6 March	Anjelia Domianus	24 February	Kinanti Laksita	2 March	
Spectacular Show	IV	Femila Sinukaban	8 February	Alfredo Fernando	27 February	Axel Nababan	17 February	Alfauzi Komdan	23 February	
Spectacular Show	III	Ramanda Almuna	1 February	Danil Pratama	20 February	Tio Ardhana	10 February	Farras Nurrana	16 February	
Spectacular Show	II	Joy Fernando	25 January	Rosalina Samosir	13 February	Nakeisha Syifa	3 February	Arrul Erwandy	9 February	
Spectacular Show	II	Kezia Sirait	25 January	Rosalina Samosir	13 February	Nakeisha Syifa	3 February	Arrul Erwandy	9 February	
Spectacular Show	I	Karen Rantung	4 January	Rachel Olivia	6 February	Manisa Rotuani	27 January	Aditya Prayoga	2 February	

== Season synopses ==
=== Season 1 ===
The first season was in 2004, when the auditions were held in five cities: Medan, Yogyakarta, Bandung, Surabaya, and Jakarta. 32,000 people auditioned. The show became a phenomenon, with the Grand Finale, in September 2004, watched by about 4 million people. There were several people, who sang off-key in the auditions, who competed on the Coba Lagi Awards (Retry Awards). The winner of this award became a guest star on The Top 11 Spectacular Show's Result Show.

The number of the finalists in the first Spectacular Show was originally planned to be 10. However, the judges then made a surprising move by picking Lucky Octavian to also get the wild-card ticket (the first wild card ticket was taken by Karen Pooroe) making the number of contestants 11. Guy Sebastian who was in Indonesia for his album promo tour, was a guest star at the Top 7 Spectacular Show.

Indonesian Idol released its first compilation album, Indonesian Idol: Indonesian All Time Hits. The album was hugely successful and gained Double Platinum status. In the album, the Top 11 sang their first hit, Ekspresi.

The two finalists who battled at the Grand Finale were Joy Destiny Tobing and Delon Thamrin. There were 7,000 people who watched the show live at Istora Senayan, Jakarta. The soon-to-be Indonesian president Susilo Bambang Yudhoyono also watched the Grand Finale.

Joy signed a contract deal with BMG Indonesia, the partner of Indonesian Idol's 19 Management. Not so long after her victory, Joy released her first album, Terima Kasih (Thank You), including her new single, most notable as her coronation song, "Karena Cinta".

After the show, the top 10 finalists (with the exception of Helena Andrian, who withdrew from participation due to the agreement issues) had a tour around Indonesia. They visited Bandung, Semarang, Surabaya, and Medan. Indonesian Idol finalists were given the opportunity as the opening singers on an American Idol tour in Singapore not long after the show.

A few weeks after the tour, Joy's agreement with the show's producer, FremantleMedia, was terminated after some problems regarding the terms of her deal. As a result, runner-up Delon Thamrin was afterwards more heavily promoted by Fremantle.

After leaving Indonesian Idol, Joy made her first international album called Rise. Rumors had it that Joy had been planning to resign from Indonesian Idol since the audition brought her fame. Delon got his first role as a movie star by starring in the movie Vina Bilang Cinta with Indonesian actress Rachel Maryam.

Before Joy left, Helena also resigned from Indonesian Idol and released her first solo album in 2005, titled Keajaiban Cinta. Nania, the second runner-up, and Karen also chose to resign shortly after Helena.

Delon's first album was released in October 2004, with the single "Bahagiaku". His album also had a huge success. He was also featured on Indonesian singer Andre Hehanusa's album with his single "Aku Masih Cinta" ("I still Love You"). Delon's second album was released in December 2005. Delon was nominated as the Best New Singer in Anugrah Planet Muzik 2005. He also won a 2005 SCTV Award as Best New Artist.

Michael Jakarimilena appeared in a movie about a Papua boy, as one of the villagers. The movie was released in Indonesia in 2006. Winda Viska Ria acted on the local sitcom called OB Office Boy. Nania was featured in Indra Lesmana's album and sang "Sedalam Cintamu" ("As Deep as Your Love") with Indra Lesmana. Adika Priatama has been working for RCTI as a news anchor.

==== Finalists ====
(ages stated at time of contest)

Contestant	Age	Hometown	Voted off	Liveshow theme
Joy Tobing	24	Jakarta	Winner	Grand Finale
Delon Thamrin	26	Jakarta	4 September 2004	Grand Finale
Nania Yusuf	20	Surabaya	21 August 2004	Tribute to Divas
Helena Andrian	20	Jakarta	14 August 2004	Indonesian Top Hits
Michael Jakarimilena	21	Surabaya	7 August 2004	Groovy Hits
Lucky Oktavian	23	Jakarta	31 July 2004	Rock
Bona Sardo	20	Jakarta	24 July 2004	Chrisye Songs
Karen Pooroe	16	Bandung	17 July 2004	Love Songs
Winda Viska	19	Jakarta	10 July 2004	Indonesian All-Time Hits
Suci Wulandari	18	Jakarta	3 July 2004	Top 40 Hits
Adika Priatama	24	Jakarta	3 July 2004	Top 40 Hits

==== Elimination chart ====
Safe first	Safe second	Eliminated

Stage:		Spectacular Show								Finale
Week:		7/3^{1}	7/10	7/17	7/24^{2}	7/31	8/7	8/14	8/21	9/4^{3}
Place	Contestant	Result								
1	Joy Tobing		Btm 3							Winner
2	Delon Thamrin						Btm 2	Btm 2		Runner-up
3	Nania Yusuf				Abs^{2}				Elim	
4	Helena Andrian			Btm 3	Btm 3	Btm 3		Elim		
5	Michael Jakarimilena	Btm 4			Btm 3	Btm 3	Elim			
6	Lucky Oktavian			Btm 3		Elim				
7	Bona Sardo				Elim					
8	Karen Pooroe	Btm 4	Btm 3	Elim						
9	Winda Viska		Elim							
10–11	Suci Wulandari	Elim								
10–11	Adika Priatama	Elim								

^{1} The first week of the Spectacular Show was a Double Elimination Week and four contestants were announced as unsafe.
^{2} Due to having appendicitis, Nania was absent from the Top 7 show, leaving the show with only 6 contestants. She was allowed to remain on the show, proceeding to the top 6-week, but just for one week. Otherwise she would automatically be voted off.
^{3} It was revealed that the number of votes cast during the Grand Finale week was approximately 4 million. Less than 6 percent separated Joy and Delon.

=== Season 2 ===
The second season started on 25 March 2005. Auditions were held from 15 February to 17 March in five cities: Makassar, Yogyakarta, Bandung, Surabaya and Jakarta. The audition in Medan was canceled due to the 2004 tsunami that destroyed most of Aceh and North Sumatra. Instead, that audition was held in Makassar. There were 38,000 people who auditioned for the second season.

There were some changes in the second season, such as there being no Wildcard round, and the number of the finalists on the spectacular show being 12. Nine male, but only three female, contestants made it to the Top 12. It is the only Indonesian Idol season to have a gender imbalance among the finalists.

The Indonesian Idol Season 2 compilation album was released three weeks after the Spectacular Show began. The title of the album was Seri Cinta or Love Songs. The single album-hit was "Cintaku", sung by Season 2's Top 12.

The two finalists in the Grand Finale were Mike and Judika. The Grand Finale was held at the Plenary Hall of Jakarta Convention Center. In the Result Show, some stars became guest stars, one of whom was Christian Bautista, a male singer from the Philippines. Pop singer Ruth Sahanaya made a surprise appearance for Mike and Judika when they sang her song, "Tak Kuduga". Season 1 finalists came to the Result Show and sang together with Season 2's finalists.

Only 1 million votes were cast during the Grand Finale week. Mike took the crown by a slim two percent margin. Judika led the vote before the Result Show, but Mike passed him and won.

Not long after the finale, Mike released his self-titled album with his new single, "Semua Untuk Cinta (All For Love)". Many Indonesian composers contributed songs to Mike's first album, including "Cinta Tak Bertuan", composed by Glenn Fredly. Runner up Judika had released his solo album in August 2006. The Top 12 contestants had a tour of Surabaya. The tour was initially planned with stops at Bandung, Yogyakarta, and Makassar. However, Fremantle canceled it without giving any reason. After seven years passed, some of the finalists of Season 2 were confirmed to return to the music industry. Maya (now Kamaya) launched his first mini album in 2010; Wisnu, who had changed his name to Nino, released two singles in 2011; Monita, who placed fourth this season, launched her first album in 2010, produced by former judge Indra Lesmana. Also, Judika became a judge in Season 9.

Ronald Silitonga, Wisnu, Danar Indra, and Top 8 of Season 3 contestant Sisi Hapsari have formed a Christian music group called Awaken, which had mild success singing Indonesian gospel. In 2013, Danar Indra confirmed the launch of his first single, "Untuk Apa" ("What For") written by Bemby Noor, who has written for Afgan and Girlband Cherrybelle.

In 2016, the public was shocked by the death of Mike Mohede from a heart attack on a Sunday afternoon. It became the most trending topic ever in Indonesian entertainment history, and he was named as one of the best personalities in Indonesian Music. Weeks later, some winners of Indonesian Idol, and other finalists, gave a tribute concert watched by thousands of fans.

In 2017, Top 12 finalist Danar Indra confirmed, through his fan page, that he would release his first Christian Contemporary album and work with the keyboardist of Tompi and Trio Lestari. In January 2018, Danar had signed a solo deal with an independent Christian label, and on 18 January 2018, Danar released his debut solo single "Tuhan Adalah Gembalaku". The single did exceptionally well in digital and became fans' long-awaited single, after 12 years, and he became the first Indonesian Contemporary Christian artist in the millennial era (2010–2018). On 18 February 2018, Danar released his debut album, And I'm Dancing... digitally. The album was influenced by the ups and downs in his life, spiritual experiences, and Psalm 23. There are ten tracks, one of which is the international version of his first single, a duet with one gospel singer Maya Uniputty. Following the success of his debut album, he released a recycled CCM song: "Kau Sangat Ku Cinta", written by Franky Sihombing, in an acoustic version. In 2020, Danar teamed with The Voice Indonesia semi-finalist Jims Wong, to release a sophomore single, "Rencana-Mu", featuring Viona Paays. The single was mastered by Nashville Auto Mastering in the US and had mild success as a new Christian Contemporary song. In 2022, Danar teamed with a Christian worship leader and former vocalist of Lifetree, Franky Kuncoro, to release a recycled song: "Pilihan Yang Terbaik", in both studio and live versions, which aired on Revivo Channel. Danar produced a new album, Greatest Story Ever Told, launched at the end of 2022.

==== Finalists ====
(ages stated at time of contest)

Contestant	Age	Hometown	Voted off	Liveshow theme
Mike Mohede	22	Jakarta	Winner	Grand Finale
Judika Sihotang	27	Sidikalang	13 August 2005	Grand Finale
Firman Siagian	27	Medan	29 July 2005	
Monita Tahalea	18	Manado	22 July 2005	
Harry Mantong	24	Palu	15 July 2005	
Maya Damayanti	22	Bandung	8 July 2005	Legends
Glenn Waas	27	Jakarta	1 July 2005	My Idols
Yudhi Manupassa	24	Jakarta	24 June 2005	Rock
Vira Puspitasari	18	Mojokerto	17 June 2005	Upbeat Songs
Wisnu Prabowo	23	Jakarta	10 June 2005	90's
Ronald Silitonga	24	Bandung	3 June 2005	Band Hits
Danar Indra	20	Nganjuk	27 May 2005	Indonesian Top Hits

==== Elimination chart ====
Safe first	Safe second	Eliminated

Stage:		Spectacular Show										Finale
Week:		5/28	6/4	6/11	6/18	6/24	7/2	7/9	7/16	7/23	7/30	8/13
Place	Contestant	Result										
1	Mike Mohede								Btm 3	Btm 2		Winner
2	Judika Sihotang											Runner-up
3	Firman Siagian							Btm 3			Elim	
4	Monita Tahalea						Btm 3		Btm 3	Elim		
5	Harry Mantong			Btm 3		Btm 3		Btm 3	Elim			
6	Maya Damayanti		Btm 3		Btm 3		Btm 3	Elim				
7	Glenn Waas		Btm 3		Btm 3	Btm 3	Elim					
8	Yudhi Manupassa	Btm 3		Btm 3		Elim						
9	Vira Puspitasari	Btm 3			Elim							
10	Wisnu Prabowo			Elim								
11	Ronald Silitonga		Elim									
12	Danar Indra	Elim										

=== Season 3 ===
The third season of Indonesian Idol was launched on 21 April 2006. The auditions were held at some of Indonesia's major cities, such as Jakarta, Bandung, Yogyakarta, Surabaya, and Medan. This season, Indonesian Idol also conducted smaller auditions other cities, such as Manado and Ambon. The contestants who passed the initial round in both Manado and Ambon were eventually brought into an elimination round in Surabaya. After an additional elimination round, the final group of contestants was brought to Jakarta to determine the final twelve contestants who made it onto the Spectacular Show.

As in previous Indonesian Idol seasons, the Spectacular Show was held in Balai Sarbini (Sarbini Building) in South Jakarta. The third season's finalists were considered better than those of the previous seasons by the judges. However, there were some surprising eliminations at the Spectacular Show. Depe, who was regarded as a strong contender, became the first contestant to be eliminated. Indra Lesmana said that Depe was eliminated way too soon. Sisi, who was a huge favorite amongst judges, was eliminated on the fifth Spectacular Show. The Final Three consisted of Gea, Dirly, and Ihsan. Gea's fans' votes were not enough to save her from elimination from the Top 3. This left Dirly and Ihsan to battle at the Season 3 Grand Finale for the Indonesian Idol title. The Grand Finale was held at the Istora Senayan (Senayan Athletic Complex) in Central Jakarta. The live audience numbered approximately 7,000 people. "Kemenangan Hati", the winner's single for the third season, was written by Indonesia's top composer, Yovie Widyanto, who also served as guest judge at the Indonesian Idol's Season 2 auditions. The Grand Finale week garnered a total of approximately 2.7 million votes. Ihsan won with a margin of 10 percent more votes than Dirly.

The compilation album for the third season was Tribute to Tonny Koeswoyo. Tonny, one of the founding members of Koes Plus, a legendary Indonesian Rock Band, died in 1987. Before his death, he and his brothers produced more than a few catchy tunes that people still remember today. The Top 12 Finalists sang "Nusantara" (Nusantara is the other name for Indonesia) as well as Koes Plus' other famous hit songs, such as "Diana" and "Kembali ke Jakarta" (Return to Jakarta).

Since the show ended, Dirly and Gea have debuted their acting career in a TV drama called Idola (Idol), which was aired on RCTI every Mondays at 8 pm. Ihsan also acted in an Islamic religious series called Maha Kasih, which is also on RCTI.

==== Finalists ====
(ages stated at time of contest)

Contestant	Age	Hometown	Voted off	Liveshow theme
Ihsan Tarore	17	Medan	Winner	Grand Finale
Dirly Sompie	17	Manado	19 August 2006	Grand Finale
Ghea Oktarin	17	Bandung	4 August 2006	
Sanobo Sasamu	26	Serui	28 July 2006	Dua Warna
Maria Priscilla	22	Yogyakarta	21 July 2006	Rock
Ilham Basso	23	Makassar	14 July 2006	Audisiku
Christy Claudia	17	Manado	7 July 2006	Populer Lagi
Sisi Hapsari	22	Jakarta	30 June 2006	Idol in Action
Brinet Sudjana	17	Bandung	23 June 2006	Colourful Love
Martesa Sumendra	18	Jakarta	16 June 2006	Kreasi dan Ekspresi
Lee Kulalean	25	Ambon	9 June 2006	Ayo Dansa
Elisabeth Depe	22	Malang	2 June 2006	Platinum 12

==== Elimination chart ====
Safe first	Safe second	Eliminated

Stage		Spectacular Show										Finale
Week:		6/2	6/9	6/16	6/23	6/30	7/7	7/14	7/21	7/28	8/4	8/19
Place	Contestant	Result										
1	Ihsan Tarore						Btm 3		Btm 2	Btm 2		Winner
2	Dirly Sompie		Btm 3			Btm 3		Btm 3				Runner-up
3	Ghea Oktarin	Btm 3									Elim	
4	Sanobo Sasamu	Btm 3								Elim		
5	Maria Priscilla							Btm 3	Elim			
6	Ilham Basso				Btm 3		Btm 3	Elim				
7	Christy Claudia			Btm 3		Btm 3	Elim					
8	Sisi Hapsari		Btm 3	Btm 3	Btm 3	Elim						
9	Brinet Sudjana				Elim							
10	Martesa Sumendra			Elim								
11	Lee Kulalean		Elim									
12	Elisabeth Depe	Elim										

=== Season 4 ===
The fourth season premiered on 30 March 2007. Auditions began in early January. Ata and Daniel were back as hosts. Indra Lesmana and Titi DJ returned as judges while Indy Barends and Dimas Djayadiningrat were replaced by Anang Hermansyah and Jamie Aditya. The fourth season's compilation album, titled Masterpiece, was released on the seventh week of the Spectacular Show. The single hit was "Bendera" (originally sung by Cokelat), performed by the Top 12 finalists.

Rini Wulandari was named the winner of Season 4 on 28 July 2007. She is the fourth finalist from Medan, North Sumatra, who made it to the finale. This season was the first time since the first season when a female won. The composition of 1 male and 3 females on the Top 4 is also exactly the same composition as in Season 1. Rini's debut album was released in November 2007, which included her winner's single. Runner-up Wilson released his first single in March 2010. Fifth-place finisher Fandy Santoso is now the lead singer of the band Kerispatih, replacing the band's former vocalist Sammy, who was kicked out of the band due to drug use.

==== Finalists ====
(ages stated at time of contest)

Contestant	Age	Hometown	Voted off	Liveshow theme
Rini Wulandari	17	Medan	Winner	Grand Finale
Wilson Maiseka	18	Ambon	28 July 2007	Grand Finale
Gabriela Christy	18	Bandung	13 July 2007	Tantangan
Sarah Hadju	27	Jakarta	6 July 2007	Tribute to Chrisye
Fandy Santoso	22	Surabaya	29 June 2007	Masterpiece
Dimas Mochammad	21	Bandung	22 June 2007	Percussion Night
Julian Syahputra	19	Bandung	15 June 2007	Movie Soundtrack
Priska Paramita	18	Makassar	8 June 2007	Musik 4 Dekade
Stevano Andrie	18	Manado	1 June 2007	Persembahanku
Marsya Nada	16	Jakarta	25 May 2007	Ungkapan Hati
Gana Eka	22	Denpasar	18 May 2007	Rock n Roll
Rismawati	25	Bandung	11 May 2007	Hits Number 1

==== Elimination chart ====
Safe first	Safe second	Eliminated

Stage:		Spectacular Show										Finale
Week:		5/11	5/18	5/25	6/1	6/8	6/15	6/22^{1}	6/29	7/6^{2}	7/13	7/28^{3}
Place	Contestant	Result										
1	Rini Wulandari								Btm 2			Winner
2	Wilson Maiseka									Btm 2		Runner-up
3	Gabriela Christy		Btm 3								Elim	
4	Sarah Hadju			Btm 3		Btm 3	Btm 3	Btm 2		Elim		
5	Fandy Santoso								Elim			
6	Dimas Mochammad			Btm 3	Btm 3	Btm 3	Btm 3	Elim				
7	Julian Syahputra				Btm 3		Elim					
8	Priska Paramita		Btm 3			Elim						
9	Stevano Andrie	Btm 3			Elim							
10	Marsya Nada			Elim								
11	Gana Eka	Btm 3	Elim									
12	Rismawati	Elim										

^{1} It was announced as the bottom two rather than the usual bottom three. Dimas was finally voted off after 5 times consecutively being placed in the bottom three or bottom two.
^{2} It was revealed that Rini got the largest number of votes. It also meant that Gaby got the second highest number of votes.
^{3} Rini received 51.2% of all the votes that were cast, while Wilson received only 48.8%

=== Season 5 ===
The fifth season of Indonesian Idol first aired on 4 April 2008 on RCTI. This season the age limit was changed to range from 16–29 to 17–29. The fifth season of Idol in Indonesia saw contestants able to perform with an instrument at any stage of the competition whereas other adaptations of Idol that have introduced live instrumentation only allow the concept at certain times during the show.

The commercial announcing Season 5 was first aired during a commercial break of Asian Idol. Online registration was open on Indonesian Idol's official website. Auditions started on 3 February, starting in Medan. Daniel returned as the show's host, along with two new hosts, Dewi Sandra and Marissa Nasution. Ata was no longer the host because she moved to Australia with her husband. Auditions were held in 15 cities. Eight cities held full auditions: Medan, Manado, Ambon, Bali, Surabaya, Bandung, Palembang, and Jakarta. Seven other cities were visited by an Audition Bus that toured: Yogyakarta, Malang, Madiun, Salatiga, Cilacap, Tegal, and Cirebon. A Dream Box was placed in The Wave Mall in Bali for auditions. The judges for the fifth season were Indra Lesmana, Titi DJ, and Anang Hermansyah.

==== Finalists ====
(ages stated at time of contest)

Contestant	Age	Hometown	Voted off	Liveshow theme
Januarisman	20	Jakarta	Winner	Grand Finale
Gisella Anastasia	18	Surabaya	2 August 2008	Grand Finale
Patudu Manik	20	Semarang	18 July 2008	
Kunto Aji Wibisono	21	Yogyakarta	11 July 2008	
Dyna Fransisca	18	Palembang	4 July 2008	
Obet JR Habibu	24	Ambon	27 June 2008	
Andy Makaruwung	26	Manado	20 June 2008	
Elizabeth Putri Estrya	21	Bandung	13 June 2008	
Dede Richo	19	Medan	6 June 2008	
Tifany Florina	20	Malang	30 May 2008	
Della Setia Kusumawati	26	Jakarta	23 May 2008	
Safira Rachma Rizkika	17	Madiun	16 May 2008	

==== Elimination chart ====
Safe first	Safe second	Eliminated

Stage:		Spectacular Show										Finale
Week:		5/16	5/23	5/30	6/6	6/13	6/20	6/27	7/4	7/11	7/18	8/2
Place	Contestant	Result										
1	Januarisman						Btm 3	Btm 3	Btm 3			Winner
2	Gisella Anastasia				Btm 3	Btm 3				Btm 3		Runner-up
3	Patudu Manik		Btm 3			Btm 3			Btm 3	Btm 3	Elim	
4	Kunto Aji Wibisono			Btm 3				Btm 3		Elim		
5	Dyna Fransisca		Btm 3				Btm 3		Elim			
6	Obet JR Habibu							Elim				
7	Andy Makaruwung						Elim					
8	Elizabeth Putri Estrya				Btm 3	Elim						
9	Dede Richo			Btm 3	Elim							
10	Tifany Florina	Btm 3		Elim								
11	Della Setia Kusumawati	Btm 3	Elim									
12	Safira Rachma Rizkika	Elim										

=== Season 6 ===
The sixth season of Indonesian Idol premiered on 5 March 2010, on RCTI. The sixth season saw several changes to the format of the show. There were 14 finalists instead of 12. Another change in the format, which was revealed in the fourth week of the Spectacular Show, is the one-time veto power for the judges to save a contestant who was eliminated by the viewers' votes.

On 12 March 2009, RCTI's CEO announced that Indonesian Idol would not be running a sixth season. But in late October 2009, RCTI surprised its audience by showing a short commercial of the Indonesian Idol logo. Rumors started spreading that Indonesian Idol would be back in 2010 after a hiatus for one season. No press confirmation was given. The judges for the sixth season were Agnes Monica, Erwin Gutawa, Rossa, and Anang Hermansyah.

After many rumors, RCTI finally confirmed the return of Indonesian for Season 6, by making audition commercials that featured Daniel Mananta (who came back as host), which confirmed that Indonesian Idol would be back in 2010. The auditions for Season 6 were held from December 2009 and in 17 cities. There was a form to fill out at the Indonesian Idol website to try for auditions. Auditioners had to be between the ages of 16 and 27 by 16 November 2009.

==== Finalists ====
(ages stated at time of contest)

Contestant	Age	Hometown	Voted off	Liveshow theme
Igo Pentury	17	Ambon	Winner	Grand Finale
Citra Scholastika	16	Yogyakarta	7 August 2010	Grand Finale
Gilang Saputra	19	Yogyakarta	23 July 2010	
Ray Generies	25	Medan	16 July 2010	
Tesa Novliana	24	Surabaya	9 July 2010	
Windra Elfi	24	Bukittinggi	2 July 2010	
Rio Basir	22	Makassar	25 June 2010	
Keyko Vredhe	21	Medan	18 June 2010	
Diana Tumewa	25	Jakarta	12 June 2010	
Fendi	19	Makassar	4 June 2010	
Dea Larasati	19	Bandung	28 May 2010	
Mona Lengkong	21	Manado	21 May 2010	
Ica Intifada	20	Surabaya	21 May 2010	
Andi Subagja	26	Bandung	14 May 2010	

==== Elimination chart ====
Safe first	Safe second	Out	Judges' save ^{2}

Stage		Spectacular Show											Finale
Week:		5/14	5/21^{1}	5/28	6/4^{2}	6/12^{3}	6/18	6/25	7/2	7/9^{4}	7/16	7/23	8/7
Ranking	Contestant	Result											
1	Igo Pentury					Btm 3			Btm 3		Btm 3		Winner
2	Citra Scholastika				Btm 3	Btm 3							Runner-up
3	Gilang Saputra			Btm 3				Btm 3	Btm 3	Btm 3	Btm 3	Out	
4	Ray Generies									Safe^{5}	Out		
5	Tesa Novliana						Btm 3	Btm 3		Out			
6	Windra Elfi								Out				
7	Rio Basir		Btm 4				Btm 3	Out					
8	Keyko Vredhe						Out						
9	Diana Tumewa				Btm 3	Out							
10	Fendi			Btm 3	Out								
11	Dea Larasati	Btm 3	Btm 4	Out									
12–13	Mona Lengkong		Out										
12–13	Ica Intifada	Btm 3	Out										
14	Andi Subagja	Out											

^{1} On 2nd Spectacular Show, 2 contestants must voted off.
^{2} Starting from the Top 10 stage, the judges can use Veto Rights, to rescue voted off contestants. Veto Rights can only be used only once.
^{3} The 5th Spectacular Show was postponed a day because of the opening of the 2010 FIFA World Cup on 11 June 2010.
^{4} On the 10th Spectacular Show, 2 contestants were voted off.
^{5} Judges use their Veto Rights to save Ray from elimination.

=== Season 7 ===
RCTI confirmed the return of Indonesian Idol for a seventh season, which aired from 17 February 2012, every Friday at 8:00 pm.

The show, which was dropped the previous year for the launch of MasterChef Indonesia, made a comeback later in the year. In 2012, RCTI appointed Fabian Dharmawan to be the Executive Producer and a project leader for Indonesian Idol 2012, while Fremantle Media appointed Glenn Sims to lead the new creative direction and tone for the series. Both Dharmawan and Sims worked closely to free the show of heavy-handed gimmicks that had bogged down previous seasons, and to dramatically lift production values. As a result, compared to all the previous seasons, this season of Idol achieved the highest ratings and share in average and went on to become the most successful season in the history of Indonesian Idol.

Daniel Mananta, who previously hosted the show, returned as the main host. The judges for this season were Anang Hermansyah, Agnes Monica, and Ahmad Dhani.

==== Finalists ====
(ages stated at time of contest)

Contestant	Age	Hometown	Voted off	Liveshow theme
Regina Ivanova	26	Jakarta	Winner	Grand Finale
Kamasean Matthews	27	Jakarta	7 July 2012	Grand Finale
Prattyoda	25	Kebumen	23 June 2012	Indonesian Hits / International Hit / Tribute to Chrisye
Dionisius Agung	26	Purwokerto	16 June 2012	Solo & Duet
Febri Yoga	24	Tegal	9 June 2012	The Lucky Songs (1st Week); Favorite & Dream Songs (2nd Week)
Maria Rosalia	21	Solo	25 May 2012	Dhani's Choice
Non Dera	19	Cianjur	18 May 2012	Viewers' Choice
Rosandy Nugroho	26	Jakarta	11 May 2012	The Power of Love / Duets
Rio Agung	18	Sumedang	4 May 2012	Tribute to Judges / Boy & Girl Band Indonesia
Ivan Saputra	24	Jakarta	27 April 2012	Songs of Dedication
Belinda Fueza	20	Jakarta	20 April 2012	The Biggest Band
Khanza Dinar	18	Jakarta	13 April 2012	The Star is Born

==== Elimination chart ====
Safe first	Safe second	Eliminated	Judges' save

Stage:		Spectacular Show											Finale
Week:		4/13	4/20	4/27	5/4	5/11	5/18	5/25	6/1	6/9	6/16	6/23	7/7
Place	Contestant	Result											
1	Regina Ivanova												Winner
2	Kamasean Matthews								Safe				Runner-up
3	Prattyoda							Btm 2		Btm 2		Elim	
4	Dionisius Agung						Btm 3				Elim		
5	Febri Yoga				Btm 3		Btm 3		Btm 2	Elim			
6	Maria Rosalia	Btm 3		Btm 3		Btm 3		Elim					
7	Non Dera				Btm 3	Btm 3	Elim						
8	Rosandy Nugroho	Btm 3		Btm 3		Elim							
9	Rio Agung		Btm 3		Elim								
10	Ivan Saputra		Btm 3	Elim									
11	Belinda Fueza		Elim										
12	Khanza Dinar	Elim											

=== Season 8 ===
The eighth season of Indonesian Idol returned in 2014. This season doubled as the 10th anniversary of Indonesian Idol. The judges for this season were Anang Hermansyah, Ahmad Dhani, Titi DJ, and Tantri Syalindri. After a great success in producing X Factor Indonesia, Fabian Dharmawan was appointed, for the second time, as the Executive Producer. A little but noticeable difference in picture quality in this series: most of the outdoor scenes were shot in HD and most of the establishing shots were shot using helicams. Still using the same but slightly improved formula in producing, Fabian invested heavily in the judges' chemistry and the raw talents of the contestants.

==== Finalists ====
(ages stated at time of contest)

Contestant	Age	Hometown	Voted off	Liveshow theme
Nowela Auparay	26	Purwokerto	Winner	Grand Finale
Husein Alatas	24	Jakarta	23 May 2014	Grand Finale
Di Muhammad Devirzha	23	Banda Aceh	9 May 2014	Road to Grand Final
Yuka Tamada	20	Makassar	2 May 2014	The Fabulous Four
Yusuf Nur Ubay	17	Magelang	25 April 2014	From the Bottom of the Heart
Giofanny Elliandrian	25	Manado	18 April 2014	Judges' Choice (1st week); From East To West (2nd week)
Windy Yunita	20	Jakarta	4 April 2014	Instant Hits
Maesarah Nur Zakah	21	Bandung	28 March 2014	We Will Rock You
Yunita Nursetia	26	Makassar	21 March 2014	The Soundtracks
Dewi Puspita	16	Madiun	14 March 2014	Worldwide Top Chart (1st week); My Love Story (2nd week)
Miranti Yassovi	24	Jakarta	14 March 2014	Worldwide Top Chart (1st week); My Love Story (2nd week)
Ryan D'Angga	24	Madiun	28 February 2014	Indonesian Mega Hits
Martinha Tereza	19	Cirebon	21 February 2014	Dream Comes True

==== Elimination chart ====
Safe first	Safe second	Eliminated

Stage:		Spectacular Show										Finale
Week:		2/21	2/28	3/14	3/21	3/28	4/4	4/18	4/25	5/2	5/9	5/23
Place	Contestant	Result										
1	Nowela Auparay											Winner
2	Husein Alatas							Btm 2				Runner-up
3	Di Muhammad Devirzha										Elim	
4	Yuka Tamada				Btm 3		Btm 2			Elim		
5	Yusuf Nur Ubay		Btm 3			Btm 2			Elim			
6	Giofanny Elliandrian	Btm 3						Elim				
7	Windy Yunita						Elim					
8	Maesarah Nur Zakah			Btm 3	Btm 3	Elim						
9	Yunita Nursetia				Elim							
10-11	Dewi Puspita	Btm 3	Btm 3	Elim								
10-11	Miranti Yassovi			Elim								
12	Ryan D'Angga		Elim									
13	Martinha Tereza	Elim										

=== Season 9 ===
The ninth season of Indonesian Idol returned at the end of 2017. After the previous, 2014 season of Indonesian Idol, FremantleMedia presented a new breakthrough singing contest, namely Just Duet, created alongside NET. However, as both had disappointing ratings, RCTI and FremantleMedia brought back Indonesian Idol for the ninth season after a three-year hiatus. The judges for this season were Ari Lasso, Armand Maulana, Bunga Citra Lestari, Judika, and Maia Estianty.

==== Finalists ====
(ages stated at time of contest)

Contestant	Age	Hometown	Voted off	Liveshow theme
Maria Simorangkir	16	Medan	Winner	Grand Finale
Ahmad Abdul	24	Denpasar	23 April 2018	Grand Finale
Joanita Veroni	20	Fakfak	9 April 2018	Superstars Duet / Contestant's Choice (1st week); Road to Grand Finale (2nd week)
Ayu Putrisundari	19	Cilegon	26 March 2018	Judges Collaborations / Top of the Charts
Ghea Indrawari	19	Singkawang	19 March 2018	Millenial Collaboration / Sing For Your Life
Marion Jola	17	Kupang	12 March 2018	Songs from 21st Century
Bianca Jodie	21	Yogyakarta	5 March 2018	Original Soundtrack
Glen Samuel	21	Jayapura	26 February 2018	Songs About Love
Chandra Wahyudi	24	Samarinda	19 February 2018	This Is Me
Kevin Aprilio	17	Yogyakarta	13 February 2018	Solo / Duet
Withney Julinetha	17	Ambon	6 February 2018	Expect the Unexpected / Audition Songs
Mona Magang	20	Atambua	30 January 2018	Indonesian Idols

==== Standing Ovation ====
Standing Ovation counted start in Live Showcase Round.

Color Gray means that night, Contestant did not show or eliminated.

List of Standing Ovation(s)
Place	Contestant	Showcase		Top 15	Spectacular Show																	Road to Grand Final		Grand Final				Result and Reunion		Total SO	Total Show	Average
Place	Contestant	Showcase		Top 15	I		II		III		2/19	2/26	3/5	3/12		3/19		3/26		4/2		Road to Grand Final		Grand Final				Result and Reunion		Total SO	Total Show	Average
Place	Contestant	1/15	1/16	1/22	1/29	1/30	2/5	2/6	2/12	2/13	2/19	2/26	3/5	3/12		3/19		3/26		4/2		4/9		4/16				4/23		Total SO	Total Show	Average
1	Maria Simorangkir	4		1	-		-	-	4	-	5	5	5	5	5	-	5	4	-	-	1	5	-	-	5	-	5	5	5	69	26	2,65
2	Ahmad Abdul	-		-	-		4	-	-	4	-	5	2	5	4	4	5	4	3	-	1	5	-	3	-	-	5	5	5	64	26	2,46
3	Joanita Veroni	-		5	2		-	-	4	1	2	-	-	-	5	-	-	4	5	-	-	-	-							28	20	1,40
4	Ayu Putrisundari		-	-		-	-	4	-	1	4	4	3	-	5	-	-	4	-											25	16	1,56
5	Ghea Indrawari		5	-	-		-	-	-	4	-	5	-	-	4	-	-													18	14	1,29
6	Marion Jola		4	-		1	-	-	-	-	-	-	1	-	4															10	12	0,83
7	Bianca Jodie	-		-		-	-	-	-	-	-	3	-																	3	10	0,30
8	Glen Samuel	-		-		1	-	-	-	-	-	-																		1	9	0,11
9	Chandra Wahyudi	-		-		-	-	-	-	-	-																			0	8	0,00
10	Kevin Aprilio		2	-	-		-	1	-	-																				3	7	0,43
11	Withney Julinetha	-		-	-		-	-																						0	5	0,00
12	Mona Magang		-	-	-																									0	3	0,00

==== Elimination chart ====
Safe first	Safe second	Eliminated

Stage:		Spectacular Show										Finale
Week:		1/30	2/6	2/13	2/19	2/26	3/5	3/12	3/19	3/26	4/9	4/23
Place	Contestant	Result										
1	Maria Simorangkir					Btm 3	Btm 3					Winner
2	Ahmad Abdul				Btm 3					Btm 2		Runner-up
3	Joanita Veroni						Btm 3		Btm 3		Elim	
4	Ayu Putrisundari				Btm 3			Btm 2	Btm 3	Elim		
5	Ghea Indrawari								Elim			
6	Marion Jola					Btm 3		Elim				
7	Bianca Jodie			Btm 3			Elim					
8	Glen Samuel	Btm 3	Btm 3	Btm 3		Elim						
9	Chandra Wahyudi		Btm 3		Elim							
10	Kevin Aprilio			Elim								
11	Withney Julinetha	Btm 3	Elim									
12	Mona Magang	Elim										

=== Season 10 ===
The tenth season of Indonesian Idol returned in 2019, after a one-year hiatus. Daniel Mananta and Sere Kalina returned as hosts for the season. The panel of judges for this season were Ari Lasso, Anang Hermansyah, Bunga Citra Lestari, Judika and Maia Estianty. There were guest judges for several city auditions. They were pop-rock singer and ex-frontman of ADA Band Baim, singer-actor Marcell Siahaan, singer Rizky Febian, winner of Season 8, Nowela Auparay, runner-up of Season 6 and pop-jazz singer Citra Scholastika, runner-up of Season 9 Ahmad Abdul, and finalist of Season 9 Marion Jola. This season was won by Lyodra Ginting and, for the first time, the top 3 were dominated by the girls. This was the comeback of Anang Hermansyah after a season's hiatus.

==== Finalists ====
(ages stated at time of contest)

Contestant	Age	Hometown	Voted off	Liveshow theme
Lyodra Ginting	16	Medan	Winner	Grand Finale
Tiara Anugrah	18	Jember	2 March 2020	Grand Finale
Ziva Magnolya	18	Bogor	17 February 2020	
Raja Giannuca	17	Solo	10 February 2020	
Mahalini Raharja	19	Denpasar	3 February 2020	
Mirabeth Sonia	24	Samarinda	27 January 2020	
Ainun Irsani	19	Palopo	20 January 2020	
Novia Bachmid	17	Bolaang Mongondow	13 January 2020	
Agseisa Galuh	26	Banjarmasin	6 January 2020	
Samuel Cipta	16	Jakarta	23 December 2019	
Richard Jeremy	24	Yogyakarta	16 December 2019	
Keisya Levronka	16	Malang	9 December 2019	
Ola Elannor	24	Mojokerto	2 December 2019	
Olivia Pardede	27	Jakarta	25 November 2019	
Alda Wiyekedella	20	Surabaya	18 November 2019	

==== Standing Ovation ====
Standing Ovation counted start in Live Showcase Round.

Color Gray means that night, Contestant did not show or eliminated.

List of Standing Ovation(s)
Place	Contestant	Showcase 1 & 2		Final Showcase 1 & 2		Spectacular Show														Road to Grand Final		Grand Final				Result and Reunion		Total SO	Total Show	Average
Place	Contestant	11/4	11/5	11/11	11/12	11/18	11/25	12/2	12/9	12/16	12/23	1/6	1/13	1/20	1/27	2/3		2/10		2/17		2/24				3/2		Total SO	Total Show	Average
1	Lyodra Ginting	-		3		1	3	5	5	5	3	-	-	5	2	5	5	5	3	2	-	-	2	5	-	5	5	69	24	2,88
2	Tiara Anugrah	-		3		3	-	3	-	5	-	-	-	5	5	5	3	-	-	-	3	-	5	3	-	5	5	53	24	2,42
3	Ziva Magnolya	5		4		2	3	2	5	1	5	-	-	-	1	5	5	-	-	-	2							40	18	2,22
4	Raja Giannuca	-		-		-	-	-	-	-	-	1	1	-	-	5	-	-	-									7	16	0,38
5	Mahalini Raharja	-		-		-	2	3	-	5	-	-	-	-	-	5	-											15	14	1,07
6	Mirabeth Sonia		3		3	-	-	5	-	-	5	-	-	-	-													16	12	1,33
7	Ainun Irsani		2		2	-	-	2	-	-	-	5	-	-														11	11	1,00
8	Novia Bachmid	-		-		-	4	5	4	5	5	1	5															29	10	2,90
9	Agseisa Galuh		2		4	-	-	3	1	-	5	-																15	9	1,67
10	Samuel Cipta	-			-	-	-	-	-	-	-																	0	8	0,00
11	Richard Jeremy	5		-		-	-	-	-	-																		5	7	0,71
12	Keisya Levronka	-		5		1	-	-	-																			6	6	1,00
13	Ola Elannor		-		-	-	-	-																				0	5	0,00
14	Olivia Pardede		5		3	-	-																					8	4	2,00
15	Alda Wiyekedella	-		-		-																						0	3	0,00

==== Elimination chart ====
Safe first	Safe second	Safe third	Eliminated

Stage:		Spectacular Show													Finale
Week:		11/18	11/25	12/2	12/9	12/16	12/23	1/6	1/13	1/20	1/27	2/3	2/10	2/17	3/2
Place	Contestant	Result													
1	Lyodra Ginting								Btm 3						Winner
2	Tiara Anugrah								Btm 3						Runner-up
3	Ziva Magnolya									Btm 3		Btm 2	Btm 2	Elim	
4	Raja Giannuca										Btm 3		Elim		
5	Mahalini Raharja			Btm 3							Btm 3	Elim			
6	Mirabeth Sonia		Btm 4			Btm 3	Btm 3	Btm 3		Btm 3	Elim				
7	Ainun Irsani					Btm 3		Btm 3		Elim					
8	Novia Bachmid								Elim						
9	Agseisa Galuh		Btm 4		Btm 3		Btm 3	Elim							
10	Samuel Cipta				Btm 3		Elim								
11	Richard Jeremy	Btm 3	Btm 4	Btm 3		Elim									
12	Keisya Levronka				Elim										
13	Ola Elannor	Btm 3		Elim											
14	Olivia Pardede		Elim												
15	Alda Wiyekedella	Elim													

=== Season 11 ===
The eleventh season was held amidst the COVID-19 pandemic. All of the judges from the previous season returned to the judging panel. Starting this season, Boy William replaced Daniel Mananta as the sole host of the show. This season was won by Rimar Callista.

==== Finalists ====
(ages stated at time of contest)

Contestant	Age	Hometown	Voted off	Liveshow theme
Rimar Callista	24	South Tangerang	Winner	Grand Finale
Mark Natama	20	Jakarta	26 April 2021	Grand Finale
Anggi Marito	19	Tarutung	12 April 2021	Road To Grand Final
Melisa Hartanto	27	Surabaya	22 March 2021	Special Collaboration Night & Electro Dance Music Vibe
Jemimah Cita	22	Jakarta	15 March 2021	Special Duet With Judges
Azhardi Athariq	19	Depok	8 March 2021	The Ultimate Playlist & Battle Duet
Kirana Anandita	18	Purwakarta	1 March 2021	Idol Love Song
Fitri Novianti	22	Mataram	22 February 2021	Nights Of The DIvas
Kelvin Joshua	23	Bekasi	15 February 2021	Superband/Band Idola
Femila Sinukaban	22	Karo	8 February 2021	Aneka Ria Idola
Ramanda Almuna	26	Tasikmalaya	1 February 2021	
Joy Fernando	21	East Flores	25 January 2021	
Kezia Sirait	26	Bogor	25 January 2021	
Karen Rantung	20	Manado	4 January 2021	

==== Standing Ovation ====
Standing Ovation counted start in Live Showcase Round.

Color Gray means that night, Contestant did not show or eliminated.

List of Standing Ovation(s)
Place	Contestant	Showcase 1 - 3			Wildcard	Final Showcase	Spectacular Show														Road to Grand Final			Grand Final				Result and Reunion		Total SO	Total Show	Average
Place	Contestant	Showcase 1 - 3			Wildcard	Final Showcase	1/4	II		2/1	2/8	2/15	2/22	3/1	3/8		3/15		3/22		Road to Grand Final			Grand Final				Result and Reunion		Total SO	Total Show	Average
Place	Contestant	12/14	12/15	12/21	12/22	12/28	1/4	1/18	1/25	2/1	2/8	2/15	2/22	3/1	3/8		3/15		3/22		4/12			4/19				4/26		Total SO	Total Show	Average
1	Rimar Callista		1		3	5	1		-	5	5	1	-	5	5	3	4	5	5	5	2	5	5	5	-	5	5	5	5	90	25	3,60
2	Mark Natama		-			-	4	1		-	3	-	-	-	-	3	4	5	-	2	4	1	-	4	3	1	-	2	2	39	25	1,63
3	Anggi Marito	-				-	5	-		-	-	-	-	2	5	5	4	5	5	5	-	5	5							46	18	2,56
4	Melisa Hartanto		2			-	5		4	5	5	1	-	-	-	4	4	-	5	-										35	15	2,33
5	Jemimah Cita			-	2	5	5		-	-	4	-	-	-	-	1	4	-												21	14	1,50
6	Azhardi Athariq		-			-	-		-	4	-	-	-	4	-	-														8	11	0,73
7	Kirana Anandita			-		4	3	2		-	5	-	2	-																16	9	1,78
8	Fitri Novianti			5		-	5	-		5	5	1	-																	21	8	2,63
9	Kelvin Joshua	-			-	-	-	-		2	2	-																		4	8	0,50
10	Femila Sinukaban	-			-	-	-	-		2	-																			2	7	0,29
11	Ramanda Almuna			-		-	-		-	4																				4	5	0,80
12-13	Joy Fernando	4				-	-		1																					5	4	1,25
12-13	Kezia Sirait		5			-	-	-																						5	4	1,25
14	Karen Rantung			3		-	-																							3	3	1,00

==== Elimination chart ====
Safe first	Safe second	Eliminated

Stage:		Spectacular Show											Finale
Week:		1/4	1/25	2/1	2/8	2/15	2/22	3/1	3/8	3/15	3/22	4/12	4/26
Place	Contestant	Result											
1	Rimar Callista					Btm 3	Btm 2				Btm 2		Winner
2	Mark Natama												Runner-up
3	Anggi Marito									Btm 2		Elim	
4	Melisa Hartanto				Btm 3						Elim		
5	Jemimah Cita			Btm 4		Btm 3		Btm 2	Btm 2	Elim			
6	Azhardi Athariq								Elim				
7	Kirana Anandita							Elim					
8	Fitri Novianti	Btm 4			Btm 3		Elim						
9	Kelvin Joshua	Btm 4	Btm 4	Btm 4		Elim							
10	Femila Sinukaban			Btm 4	Elim								
11	Ramanda Almuna		Btm 4	Elim									
12-13	Joy Fernando		Elim										
12-13	Kezia Sirait	Btm 4	Elim										
14	Karen Rantung	Elim											

=== Season 12 ===
The twelfth season went into production after Indonesia's Got Talent's Season 3 finale. The cities scheduled to hold auditions were Medan, Bandung, Denpasar, Yogyakarta, Flores, Kupang, Samarinda, Manado, Lombok, Malang, Surabaya, and Jakarta. The auditions began on 8 October 2022 and concluded on 13 November 2022.

This marked the second season for Boy William as the sole host of the show. Maia Estianty became the guest judge this season, while Ari Lasso left the judging panel after three seasons. Bunga Citra Lestari returned as judge, with David Bayu, vocalist of Indonesian band Naif, joining the judging panel for the first time. Showcase rounds were held on 16 and 17 January, the Top 15 round began on 30 January, and the Spectacular Show began on 6 February. The season concluded on 22 May and was won by Salma Salsabil.

==== Finalists ====
(ages stated at time of contest)

Contestant	Age	Hometown	Voted off	Liveshow theme
Salma Salsabil	20	Probolinggo	Winner	Grand Finale
Nabillah Taqqiyah	17	Banda Aceh	22 May 2023	Grand Finale
Rony Parulian	21	Jakarta	8 May 2023	The Ultimate Song
Nyoman Paul	21	Buleleng	1 May 2023	Hits Idol
Raisa Syarla	19	Kutai Kartanegara	10 April 2023	A New Harmony & The Powe of Dream Song
Novia Situmeang	23	Sidikalang	3 April 2023	Trio Medley Song & Indonesian Viral Song
Neyl Author	26	Bandung	27 March 2023	Goyang Melayu Band Indonesia (EDM Ver.)
Anggis Devaki	20	Gianyar	20 March 2023	Duet & 1 Billion Views Song
Dimansyah Laitupa	24	Ambon	13 March 2023	Soundtrack Indonesian Movie
Rahman Sadli	24	Ambon	6 March 2023	Indonesian Male Singer
Alfredo Fernando	18	Bekasi	27 February 2023	Dangdut/Koplo/Jawa
Danil Pratama	23	Central Bangka	20 February 2023	Indonesian Female Singer
Rosalina Samosir	23	Medan	13 February 2023	Indonesian Big Band
Rachel Olivia	17	Jakarta	6 February 2023	Free Song

==== Standing Ovation ====
Standing Ovation counted start in Live Showcase Round.

Color Gray means that night, Contestant did not show or eliminated.

List of Standing Ovation(s)
Place	Contestant	Showcase 1 & 2		Final Showcase 1 & 2		Road to Spectacular Show	Spectacular Show															Road to Grand Final		Grand Final				Result and Reunion	Total SO	Total Show	Average
Place	Contestant	1/16	1/17	1/23	1/24	1/30	2/6	2/13	2/20	2/27	3/6	3/13	3/20		3/27	4/3		4/10		5/1		5/8		5/15				5/22	Total SO	Total Show	Average
1	Salma Salsabil		-	5		5	2	-	-	5	2	5	5	5	5	5	3	4	5	-	5	5	3	5	5	5	3	5	92	25	3,68
2	Nabillah Taqqiyah		-	-		-	-	-	-	-	3	3	-	5	1	3	3	4	-	2	-	5	3	5	5	1	3	5	51	25	2,04
3	Rony Parulian	-			-	-	-	-	-	2	1	-	5	-	-	3	-	4	5	-	-	5	5						30	20	1,50
4	Nyoman Paul	-			-	-	1	-	-	2	-	4	-	4	-	3	5	4	4	2	-								29	18	1,61
5	Raisa Syarla	-			2	-	-	-	-	-	-	-	4	-	1	5	1	4	-										17	16	1,06
6	Novia Situmeang		5	-		1	1	-	-	4	5	2	-	2	5	5	-												30	14	2,14
7	Neyl Author		2	3		5	-	-	-	5	5	4	-	1	5														30	12	2,50
8	Anggis Devaki	-		2		-	-	-	-	-	-	-	4	-															6	11	0,54
9	Dimansyah Laitupa	-			-	-	-	1	-	1	-	1																	3	9	0,33
10	Rahman Sadli		3	1		-	-	3	3	1	-																		11	8	1,37
11	Alfredo Fernando	5			-	1	3	-	-	-																			9	7	1,28
12	Danil Pratama	-		-		-	-	-	-																				0	6	0,00
13	Rosalina Samosir	-			1	-	-	-																					1	5	0,20
14	Rachel Olivia	-			-	3	-																						3	4	0,75

==== Elimination chart ====
Safe first	Safe second	Eliminated

Stage:		Spectacular Show												Finale
Week:		2/6	2/13	2/20	2/27	3/6	3/13	3/20	3/27	4/3	4/10	5/1	5/8	5/22
Place	Contestant	Result												
1	Salma Salsabil													Winner
2	Nabillah Taqqiyah													Runner-up
3	Rony Parulian					Btm 2	Btm 3		Btm 2	Btm 3		Btm 2	Elim	
4	Nyoman Paul							Btm 3		Btm 3	Btm 2	Elim		
5	Raisa Syarla		Btm 2								Elim			
6	Novia Situmeang				Btm 2					Elim				
7	Neyl Author						Btm 3	Btm 3	Elim					
8	Anggis Devaki							Elim						
9	Dimansyah Laitupa			Btm 3			Elim							
10	Rahman Sadli	Btm 3	Btm 3		Btm 3	Elim								
11	Alfredo Fernando	Btm 3		Btm 3	Elim									
12	Danil Pratama			Elim										
13	Rosalina Samosir		Elim											
14	Rachel Olivia	Elim												

=== Season 13 ===
RCTI and Fremantle announced that Indonesian Idol would be back for its thirteenth season. Auditions were held in thirteen cities, five for major auditions while eight for minor auditions. The cities included were Surabaya, Palembang, Medan, Denpasar, Surakarta, Kupang, Banjarmasin, Makassar, Yogyakarta, Malang, Semarang, Kupang, Bandung, and Jakarta. Auditions started on 27–28 June 2024, at Semarang, while the season premiered on 9 December 2024.

Maia Estianty returned as main judge, replacing David Bayu, who withdrew due to his daughter's controversies. Showcase rounds were held on 6 and 7 January, the Top 15 round began on 20 January, and the Spectacular Show began on 27 January. The season concluded on 19 May and was won by Shabrina Leanor.

==== Finalists ====
(ages stated at time of contest)

Contestant (Note: Name of the contestants are their stage name.)	Age	Hometown	Voted off	Liveshow theme
Shabrina Leanor	24	East Belitung	Winner	Grand Finale
Fajar Noor	20	Medan	19 May 2025	Grand Finale
Mesa Hira	18	Medan	5 May 2025	The Fams Special Performance
Vanessa Zee	20	Pematangsiantar	28 April 2025	Idol X Juicy Luicy
Angie Carvalho	16	Banjarmasin	21 April 2025	Idola & Cerita Cinta
Piche Kota	22	Atambua	24 March 2025	Idol in Harmony
Kenriz	23	Central Aceh	17 March 2025	Idol Switch (Cross Gender Song)
Rara Sudirman	16	Jakarta	10 March 2025	Idol and The Beat
Shakirra Vier	16	Bandung	3 March 2025	Idolanya Idola
Anjelia Dom	21	Medan	24 February 2025	Idol Digoyang
Axelo	18	South Tangerang	17 February 2025	Original Soundtrack
Ardhitio	20	Medan	10 February 2025	Indonesian Top Streams Playlist
Nakei	16	Medan	3 February 2025	Indonesian Middle - Up Tempo (Beat/Groove)
Manisa Llona	23	Bekasi	27 January 2025	Contestants' Choice

==== Standing Ovation ====
Standing Ovation counted start in Live Showcase Round.

Color Gray means that night, Contestant did not show or eliminated.

List of Standing Ovation(s)
Place	Contestant	Showcase 1 & 2		Final Showcase 1 & 2		Road to Spectacular Show	Spectacular Show														Road to Grand Final			Grand Final				Result and Reunion		Total SO	Total Show	Average
Place	Contestant	1/6	1/7	1/13	1/14	1/20	1/27	2/3	2/10	2/17	2/24	3/3	3/10	3/17	3/24		4/21		4/28		5/5			5/12				5/19		Total SO	Total Show	Average
1	Shabrina Leanor		5		1	2	3	-	-	5	3	1	1	-	-	5	-	-	5	2	4	3	5	5	5	5	5	4	4	73	26	2,80
2	Fajar Noor		5	-		4	-	-	-	4	-	-	5	-	5	-	2	-	-	5	4	5	5	5	5	5	5	4	4	72	26	2,76
3	Mesa Hira		-	2		-	-	-	2	-	-	1	5	5	-	-	-	1	4	-	4	-	-							24	20	1,20
4	Vanessa Zee	-		3		2	-	1	-	-	5	-	-	-	-	-	1	-	5	5										22	17	1,29
5	Angie Carvalho	4			-	5	5	4	5	2	2	5	5	-	5	5	3	-												50	15	3,33
6	Piche Kota	-		-		-	-	1	-	1	-	-	-	2	-	-														4	13	0,30
7	Kenriz		-	-		-	-	1	-	1	-	1	-	2																5	11	0,45
8	Rara Sudirman		-		2	2	-	-	-	4	5	4	5																	22	10	2,20
9	Shakirra Vier	-			-	-	2	2	2	3	-	3																		12	9	1,33
10	Anjelia Dom	1		-		4	-	5	-	5	1																			16	8	2,00
11	Axelo		-		-	-	-	2	-	-																				2	7	0,28
12	Ardhitio		-	-		-	-	-	-																					0	6	0,00
13	Nakei	4		-		-	-	-																						4	5	0,80
14	Manisa Llona		-		-	1	-																							1	4	0,25

==== Elimination chart ====
Safe first	Safe second	Eliminated

Stage:		Spectacular Show												Finale
Week:		1/27	2/3	2/10	2/17	2/24	3/3	3/10	3/17	3/24	4/21	4/28	5/5	5/19
Place	Contestant	Result												
1	Shabrina Leanor						Btm 3							Winner
2	Fajar Noor											Btm 2		Runner-up
3	Mesa Hira					Btm 3			Btm 2		Btm 2		Elim	
4	Vanessa Zee							Btm 2		Btm 2		Elim		
5	Angie Carvalho			Btm 3			Btm 3				Elim			
6	Piche Kota									Elim				
7	Kenriz				Btm 3				Elim					
8	Rara Sudirman		Btm 3	Btm 3		Btm 3		Elim						
9	Shakirra Vier	Btm 3			Btm 3		Elim							
10	Anjelia Dom					Elim								
11	Axelo	Btm 3	Btm 3		Elim									
12	Ardhitio			Elim										
13	Nakei		Elim											
14	Manisa Llona	Elim												

=== Season 14 ===
RCTI and Fremantle announced that Indonesian Idol would be back for its fourteenth season. Auditions were held in thirteen cities, five for major auditions while eight for minor auditions. The cities included were Surabaya, Palembang, Medan, Denpasar, Surakarta, Kupang, Banjarmasin, Makassar, Yogyakarta, Malang, Semarang, Kupang, Bandung, and Jakarta. Auditions started on 3–4 July 2025, at Surakarta, while the season premiered on 22 December 2025.

Soleh Solihun joined as new main judge, replacing Anang Hermansyah. Showcase rounds were held on 19 and 20 January, and the Spectacular Show began on 2 February. The season concluded on 25 May and was won by Celyna Grace.

==== Finalists ====
(ages stated at time of contest)

Contestant (Note: Name of the contestants are their stage name.)	Age	Hometown	Voted off	Liveshow theme
Celyna Grace	18	Semarang	Winner	Grand Finale
Niki Becker	22	Bekasi	25 May 2026	Grand Finale
Rio Lahskart	25	Mojokerto	11 May 2026	Cerita Cinta Idola
Meidra	25	Tanjung Balai Karimun	4 May 2026	The Aces & the Queens "Untuk Kamu Yang Selalu Ada"
Josh Flo	26	Manokwari	27 April 2026	Lima Idola (Idola Duet & Fresh Hits)
Ecky	26	Banjarmasin	20 April 2026	Idol Akustika
Kezi Stephanie	20	Kupang	13 April 2026	Idol Timuran
Dandy Panjawi	26	Makassar	6 April 2026	Idol and the Beat
Arrcely	22	Malang	30 March 2026	Idola Irama
Keiko Regine	17	Jakarta	9 March 2026	A Day with Judges
Keenan	16	Jember	2 March 2026	Idolanya Idola
Ozi Alfauz	25	Ternate	23 February 2026	Movie Soundtrack
Aruna	16	Semarang	16 February 2026	
Arrul Munyenyo	20	Batam	9 February 2026	
Praditya	24	Bone	2 February 2026	

==== Standing Ovation ====
Standing Ovation counted start in Live Showcase Round.

Color Gray means that night, Contestant did not show or eliminated.

List of Standing Ovation(s)
Place	Contestant	Showcase 1 & 2		Final Showcase 1 & 2		Spectacular Show																		Road to Grand Final		Grand Final				Result and Reunion				Total SO	Total Show	Average
Place	Contestant	1/19	1/20	1/26	1/27	2/2	2/9	2/16	2/23	3/2	3/9	3/30	4/6		4/13		4/20		4/27		5/4			5/11		5/18				5/25				Total SO	Total Show	Average
1	Celyna Grace	-			-	-	-	4	4	3	2	1	3	5	-	-	1	-	4	-	-	2	-	4	-	-	5	-	-	-	-	-	-	38	30	1.27
2	Niki Becker	-			2	3	1	-	-	-	4	3	1	-	4	-	1	-	-	-	4	5	-	4	-	2	3	-	1	4	-	4	-	46	30	1.53
3	Rio Lahskart	-		1		-	4	-	1	-	2	1	-	5	4	4	4	2	4	3	2	4	4	4	-									49	22	2.23
4	Meidra	-		-		-	-	-	1	-	4	-	-	-	1	-	-	-	-	4	-	5	4											19	20	0.95
5	Josh Flo		2	-		-	-	-	-	1	-	-	-	-	-	4	2	2	2	2														15	17	0.88
6	Ecky		-		-	-	-	-	2	-	4	-	-	-	-	4	-	2																12	15	0.80
7	Kezi Stephanie	-			-	3	-	-	-	-	-	-	-	-	-	-																		3	13	0.23
8	Dandy Panjawi	2		-		-	-	-	-	-	-	-	-	-																				2	11	0.18
9	Arrcely		-	-		-	-	-	-	-	-	-																						0	9	0.00
10	Keiko Regine		-		-	2	-	-	-	-	1																							3	8	0.38
11	Keenan	1			-	-	-	-	2	-																								3	7	0.43
12	Ozi Alfauz	-		1		-	-	-	-																									1	6	0.17
13	Aruna		-		-	-	-	-																										0	5	0,00
14	Arrul Munyenyo		-	-		-	-																											0	4	0.00
15	Praditya		-		-	-																												0	3	0.00

==== Elimination chart ====
Safe first	Safe second	Eliminated

Stage:		Spectacular Show													Finale
Week:		2/2	2/9	2/16	2/23	3/2	3/9	3/30	4/6	4/13	4/20	4/27	5/4	5/11	5/25
Place	Contestant	Result													
1	Celyna Grace				Btm 3										Winner
2	Niki Becker						Btm 3						Btm 2		Runner-up
3	Rio Lahskart	Btm 3				Btm 3				Btm 2				Elim	
4	Meidra						Btm 3	Btm 3			Btm 2	Btm 2	Elim		
5	Josh Flo					Btm 3			Btm 2			Elim			
6	Ecky		Btm 3								Elim				
7	Kezi Stephanie									Elim					
8	Dandy Panjawi	Btm 3			Btm 3			Btm 3	Elim						
9	Arrcely							Elim							
10	Keiko Regine			Btm 3			Elim								
11	Keenan		Btm 3			Elim									
12	Ozi Alfauz			Btm 3	Elim										
13	Aruna			Elim											
14	Arrul Munyenyo		Elim												
15	Praditya	Elim													

== Indonesian Idol Extra ==
This supplementary program features news and updates about Indonesian Idol contestants, highlights from the show, as well as exclusive behind-the-scenes coverage of Indonesian Idol. The show first aired in 2004.

Year	Season	Title	Host(s)
2004	1	Demam Indonesian Idol	Addry Danuatmadja
2005	2	Indonesian Idol Extra	Herjunot Ali, Suci Wulandari
2006	3	Idol Banget	Nirina Zubir, Indra Bekti
2007	4	Idol Banget	Nirina Zubir, Indra Bekti, Olga Syahputra
2008	5	Idol Hi-Five	Arie Dagienk, Magdalena
2010	6	Dahsyat-nya Indonesian Idol	Raffi Ahmad, Olga Syahputra, Luna Maya
2012	7	Indonesian Idol X-TRA	Daniel Mananta, Ayya Renita
2014	8	Dahsyat-nya Indonesian Idol	Raffi Ahmad, Ayu Dewi
2018	9	Idol Banget	All Contestant
2019–20	10	Idol Xtra	All Contestant
2020–21	11	Idol Xtra	All Contestant
2023	12	Idol Xtra	All Contestant
2025	13	Idol Xtra	All Contestant
2026	14	Idol Xtra	All Contestant

== Controversies ==
- Joy, the winner of the first season, ceased all ties with Fremantle Media and the Indonesian Idol franchise within weeks of her victory, due to contractual disagreements between Joy and the show's management Indomugi Pratama. This included a six-year contract with Sony BMG and several appearance commitments, including singing at local malls. Joy found this offensive to the Idol title. All traces of her Idol journey were removed from the official site.
- During the Workshop Round of Season 4 and Season 5, many contestants said Saya sudah berusaha.. ("At least I've tried...") or Apabila saya diberi kesempatan untuk minggu depan, saya akan ... ("If people give me the chance to stay here for another week, I will...") or Apabila Indonesia memilih saya untuk minggu depan, saya....("If Indonesia chooses me for next week, I....") when they received negative feedback from the panels. This stirred up some rumors among fans that it might have been scripted.

== Awards and nominations ==
Year	Association	Category	Nominee	Result
2005	Panasonic Awards	Program Music/Variety Show Terfavorit (Favorite Music/Variety Show Program)	Indonesian Idol	Won
2006	Panasonic Awards	Program Music/Variety Show Terfavorit (Favorite Music/Variety Show Program)	Indonesian Idol	Won
2006	Panasonic Awards	Presenter Musik/Variety Show Terfavorit (Favorite Music/Variety Show Program)	Daniel Mananta	Nominated
2007	Panasonic Awards	Program Music/Variety Show Terfavorit (Favorite Music/Variety Show Program)	Indonesian Idol	Nominated
2007	Panasonic Awards	Presenter Musik/Variety Show Terfavorit (Favorite Music/Variety Show Host)	Daniel Mananta	Nominated
2011	Panasonic Gobel Awards	Program Pencarian Bakat Terfavorit (Favorite Talent Search Program)	Indonesian Idol 2010	Nominated
2011	Panasonic Gobel Awards	Presenter Talent Show Terfavorit (Favorite Talent Show Host)	Daniel Mananta	Nominated
2013	Panasonic Gobel Awards	Program Pencarian Bakat Terfavorit (Favorite Talent Search Program)	Indonesian Idol 2012	Nominated
2013	Panasonic Gobel Awards	Presenter Talent Show Terfavorit (Favorite Talent Show Host)	Daniel Mananta	Won
2015	Panasonic Gobel Awards	Program Pencarian Bakat & Reality Show Terfavorit (Favorite Talent Search & Reality Show Program)	Indonesian Idol 2014	Nominated
2018	Panasonic Gobel Awards	Program Pencarian Bakat Terfavorit (Favorite Talent Search Program)	Indonesian Idol musim 9 (season 9)	Won
