= Nowela Auparay =

Indonesian singer

Nowela Elizabeth Auparay
- Born: Nowela Elizabeth Mikhelia Auparay; 19 December 1987 (age 38); Wamena, Papua, Indonesia
- Genres: R&B, pop, rock
- Occupation: Singer
- Instrument: Vocal
- Years active: 2014–present
- Labels: Universal Music Indonesia

Nowela Elizabeth Mikhelia Auparay (born 19 December 1987) is an Indonesian singer and winner of the eighth season of Indonesian Idol.

== Career ==
Nowela was born in Wamena, Papua. Her father is of Papua New Guinean descent, and her mother is of Batak descent. After graduating from high school, she worked as a café singer for six years before participating in the eighth season of Indonesian Idol.

== Performances and results ==
Performances and results Indonesian Idol (season 8)
Episode	Theme	Song	Original artist	Result
Audition	N/A	"Mercy"	Duffy	Advanced
1st Elimination	A capella	"Wrecking Ball"	Miley Cyrus	Advanced
2nd Elimination	Group Performance	"Mama Papa Larang"	Judika	Advanced
3rd Elimination	Solo	"Royal"	Lorde	Advanced
Top 15	N/A	"Superwoman"	Alicia Keys	Advanced
Top 14	The Dream Come True	"Wrecking Ball"	Miley Cyrus	Advanced
Top 13	Mega Hits Indonesia	"Apanya Dong"	Euis Darliah	Advanced
Top 12	Worldwide's Top Chart	"Rude Boy"	Rihanna	Advanced
Top 11	My Love Story	"Uninvited"	Alanis Morissette	Advanced
Top 10	The Greatest Soundtrack	"Let it Go"	Idina Menzel	Advanced
Top 9	We Will Rock You	"Black Dog"	Led Zeppelin	Advanced
Top 8	Instant Hits	"Team"	Lorde	Advanced
Top 7	Judges' Choice	"Sang Dewi"	Titi DJ	Advanced
Top 7	Judges' Choice	"The One That Got Away"	Katy Perry	Advanced
Top 6	From East To West	"Rekayasa Cinta"	Camelia Malik	Advanced
Top 6	From East To West	"Empire State of Mind"	Alicia Keys feat. Jay-Z	Advanced
Top 5	From The Bottom Of Heart	"Bukan Dia Tapi Aku"	Judika	Advanced
Top 5	From The Bottom Of Heart	"Unconditionally"	Katy Perry	Advanced
Top 4	The Fabulous Four	"(You Make Me Feel Like) A Natural Woman"	Aretha Franklin	Advanced
Top 4	The Fabulous Four	"Just Give Me a Reason"	Pink feat. Nat Rues (feat. Sandy Shandoro)	Advanced
Top 3	Road To Grand Final	"Run the World (Girls)"	Beyoncé	Advanced
Top 3	Road To Grand Final	"Hanya Memuji"	Marcell Siahaan feat. Shanty (feat. Marcell Siahaan)	Advanced
Grand Final	N/A	"Only Girl (In the World)"	Rihanna	Advanced
Grand Final	N/A	"Apakah Ini Cinta"/ "Alone"	Judika/ Heart (feat. Judika)	Advanced
Grand Final	N/A	"Roar"	Katy Perry	Advanced
Result and Reunion	A Decade of Dreams	"Feel This Moment"	Pitbull feat. Christina Aguilera	Winner
Result and Reunion	A Decade of Dreams	"Membawa Cinta"	Winning song (feat. Iwa-K and Husein Alatas)	Winner

Preceded by Regina Ivanova	Indonesian Idol winner 2014	Succeeded by Maria Simorangkir
