= Rini Wulandari =

Rinni Wulandari
- Born: Rini Wulandari; 28 April 1987 (age 39)
- Origin: Medan, North Sumatra, Indonesia
- Genres: R&B, Indo Pop
- Occupation: singer
- Years active: 2007–present
- Label: SKY Entertainment
- Spouse: Jevin Julian (m. 2017)

Rini Wulandari (born 28 April 1987) or known by her stage name, RINNI, is an Indonesian R&B singer. On 28 July 2007, she won the fourth season of the reality television show Indonesian Idol, making her the second female winner. She won the competition at the age of 17, making her the first youngest winner in Indonesian Idol history.

== Biography ==
=== Early life ===
Rini Wulandari was born to R.Soetrisno and Sri Hartati Mardiningish. She is the youngest of four children. She came from a family of musicians. Her mother was a former lead singer of Quintana Band and her father was a bassist when he was young. Rini became the lead singer of Quintana, following in the footsteps of her mother. Rini graduated from SMA Negeri 1 Medan in 2004.

=== Indonesian Idol ===
Rini auditioned for Idol in her hometown of Medan on the second day auditions. On 5 May 2007, Rini made it into the top twelve of Indonesian Idol or also known Spectacular rounds. In the first spectacular round, she sang Warna's "50 Tahun Lagi". During the top 6 performances which was Percussion Night week, Rini sang a rendition of Gloria Estefan's "Conga" which garnered her a top 5 position. Other songs Rini performed on Indonesian Idol include Christina Aguilera's "Reflection", Mariah Carey's "Emotions", and Celine Dion's "Because You Loved Me". Rini made it to the finale and won the title over Wilson with 51.2% of the audience vote.

=== List of Indonesian Idol performances ===
Original audition: "Cintai Aku Lagi" by Sania

Week #	Song Choice	Original Artist	Theme	Result
1st Workshop	"Cintai Aku Lagi"	Sania	Personal Choice	Safe
2nd Workshop	"Kuakui"	Dewi Sandra	Personal Choice	Safe
3rd Workshop	"Percayalah"	Ecoutez	Personal Choice	Safe
Pre Gala Show	"Reflection"	Christina Aguilera	Personal Choice	Selected to Spectacular Rounds
Top 12	"50 Tahun Lagi"	Warna	Indonesian Top Hits	Safe
Top 11	"Antara Ada dan Tiada"	Utopia	Rock Week	Safe
Top 10	"Because You Loved Me"	Celine Dion	Voice of The Heart	Safe
Top 9	"Jera"	Agnes Monica	Dedication	Safe
Top 8	"I Love You"	Dewi Sandra	Four Decade of Music	Safe
Top 7	"Matahari"	Berlian Hutauruk	Movies Soundtracks	Safe
Top 6	"Conga"	Miami Sound Machine	Percussion Night	Safe
Top 5	"Cinta Jangan Kau Pergi"	Sheila Majid	Masterpiece	Bottom two
Top 4	"Seperti Yang Kau Minta" "Zamrud Khatulistiwa"	Chrisye	Tribute to Chrisye	First to Safe
Top 3	"Cinta" "Emotions"	Titiek Puspa; Mariah Carey	The Challenge	Safe
Battle Cafe Show	"Lelaki Buaya Darat" "Tanpa Kekasihku" "Kuakui"	Ratu; Agnes Monica; Dewi Sandra	Personal Choice	—
Grand Final	"Warna" "Because You Loved Me" "Aku Tetap Milikmu"	Sheila Majid; Celine Dion; Original Song	Judges' Choice; Personal Choice; Winner Song	Winner

=== After Idol ===
Rinni Wulandari has released 4 albums, 'Aku Tetap Milikmu'(2007)'Independent Part 1'(2015) 'Independent Part 2'(2017) and her latest album SKINS (2021).

Rinni has another duo project "SOUNDWAVE" along with her husband, Jevin Julian. They met on the Producer/Remixer Competition on Net TV in 2015. Since then, they decided to keep making music as a duo until now.

Through her career, Rinni Wulandari has been nominated in several music awards, such as AMI Awards, Anugrah Planet Muzik Singapore, and Indonesian Choice Awards. In 2020, she won AMI Awards for the first time as The Best R&B Singer. She also performed at Music Matters Singapore in 2015. Rinni performed for the opening ceremony ASEAN GAMES in 2018. She collaborated with other South East Asian artists for a charity single 'Heal' for COVID-19 in August 2020.

=== List of Asian Idol : Choice of Indonesia performances ===
Week #	Song Choice	Original Artist	Result
Premiere	"Andai Aku Bisa" "Crazy in Love" "Di Penghujung Muda" "Breakthrough" "Zamrud Khatulistiwa" "When You Believe" (With Delon, Mike & Ihsan)	Chrisye; Beyoncé Knowles; Samsons Nidji Chrisye; Whitney Houston & Mariah Carey	—
Finale	"I Love You" (Duet with Dewi Sandra) "Ketahuan" (Duet With Mike) "Do I Make You Proud" (With Delon, Mike & Ihsan)	Dewi Sandra; Matta Band; Taylor Hicks	—

=== Graduate ===
In 2012, she is one of the small list of Indonesian artists with bachelor's degrees which graduated from Paramadina University, Jakarta majored in communications. "I'm relieved. I can concentrate more on my singing career now.

== Discography ==
=== Albums ===
- 2007: Indonesian Idol: Masterpiece (Compilation)
- 2007: Aku Tetap Milikmu
- 2010: Idola Terdahsyat (Compilation)
- 2015 Independent Part 1
- 2017 Independent Part 2
- 2021 SKINS

=== EP ===
- 2023 Crescent

Preceded by Ihsan Tarore	Indonesian Idol winner Rini Wulandari (2007)	Succeeded by Aris Runtuwene
