= Januarisman =

Aris
- Born: Januarisman Runtuwene; 25 January 1985 (age 41)
- Origin: Jakarta, Indonesia
- Genres: Rock music
- Occupations: Musician, singer-songwriter
- Instruments: Vocals, guitar, piano, keyboard
- Years active: 2008–present
- Label: Sony BMG Indonesia

Januarisman Runtuwene better known as Januarisman or Aris, (born 25 January 1985, in Jakarta, Indonesia) is an Indonesian rock singer. On 2 August 2008, he won the fifth season of the reality show Indonesian Idol. After winning a competition BMG Recordings terminated his contract while he was recording his first album. As of now, he has no singles or albums released. He has no plans to sue the company for terminating the contract.

== Biography ==
=== Early life ===
Aris dropped out of school and became a street musician for financial reasons when he was in middle school. He used to perform in many public places, such as Kampung Melayu bus station and the KRL Jabotabek train. He was married to Rosalia Oktaviani and has one son named Mocalist Rasya Faturullah.

== Indonesian Idol ==
Aris auditioned for Indonesian Idol in Jakarta.

He sang a song from an Indonesian band ST12,"Rasa Yang Tertinggal". Titi DJ, one of the judges, cried during Aris' performance.

Aris made it to the final and won season five of Indonesian Idol after defeating Gisella Anastasia.

=== List of Indonesian Idol performances ===
Week #	Song Choice	Original Artist	Result
Audition	"Rasa Yang Tertinggal" "Rahasia Hati" "Akhir Cerita Cinta"	ST 12; Kerispatih; Glenn Fredly	Advanced
Elimination Round	"Menjaga Hati"	Yovie and Nuno	Advanced
1st Workshop	"Permintaan Hati"	Letto	Safe
2nd Workshop	"Rasa Yang Tertinggal"	ST 12	Safe
Pre Gala Show	"Sedang Ingin Bercinta"	Dewa 19	Selected to Spectacular Rounds
Top 12	"Terbang"	Gigi	Safe
Top 11	"Masih (Sahabatku, Kekasihku)"	ADA Band	Safe
Top 10	"Sobat"	Padi	Safe
Top 9	"Bayang Semu"	Ungu	Safe
Top 8	"Disini Untukmu"	Ungu	Safe
Top 7	"Mana Kutahu"	Ari Lasso	Bottom Three
Top 6	"Sahabat"	Peterpan	Bottom Three
Top 5	"Seperti Bintang"	Yovie and Nuno	Safe
Top 4	"Sepanjang Usia" "Tak Bisa Ke Lain Hati"	Kerispatih; KLakustik	Safe
Top 3	"Tak Akan Ada Cinta Yang Lain" "Berartinya Dirimu"	Dewa 19; Krisdayanti featuring Anang Hermansyah	Safe*
Grand Final	"Mana Kutahu" "The Reason" "Rasa Yang Tertinggal"	Ari Lasso; Hoobastank; ST 12	–
Grand Final Result and Reunion Show	"Harapkan Sempurna"	Aris	Winner

- It was revealed that Aris received the most votes out of the Top 3

== Discography ==
=== Singles ===
Year	Title	Album
2008	"Harapkan Sempurna"	"Harapkan Sempurna" – Single

Preceded by Rini Wulandari	Indonesian Idol winner Aris (2008)	Succeeded by Igo Pentury
