= Anang Hermansyah =

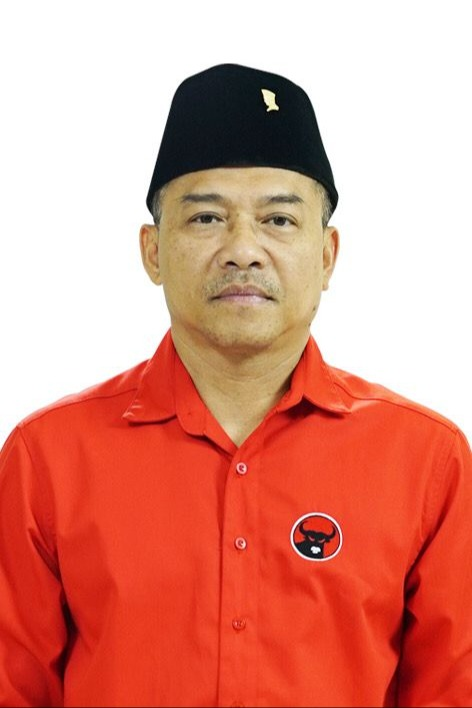

Member of the People's Representative Council
- In office 1 Oktober 2014 – 1 Oktober 2019
- President: Joko Widodo
- Constituency: East Java IV; Jember & Lumajang

Personal details
- Born: Anang Hermansyah; 18 March 1969 (age 57) Jember, East Java, Indonesia
- Party: National Mandate Party (Since 2014)
- Spouses: Krisdayanti (m. 1996; div. 2009) Ashanty (m. 2012)
- Children: 4
- Parent(s): Abdul Choliq Wijaya (father); Anissa Choliq Wijaya (mother)
- Relatives: Atta Halilintar (son-in law)
- Education: SMA Negeri 4 Surabaya
- Occupation: Musician • Producer • Politician
- Musical career
- Genres: Rock; pop; hard rock; pop rock; soft rock; pop metal; alternative rock
- Instruments: Vocal; Guitar
- Label: Warner Music Indonesia

Anang Hermansyah (born 18 March 1969) is an Indonesian singer, musician, producer, and politician, who served as a member of the People's Representative Council from the East Java IV constituency as from 2014 until 2019. Since 2007, Anang has been one of the judges for the singing talent contest Indonesian Idol.

== Early life and education ==
Anang attended elementary school in SD Jember Kidul in 1977 and entered middle school in SMP Negeri 1 Jember in 1983. He would go to SMA Negeri 4 Surabaya for high school in 1986.

== Musical career ==
Anang joined a band in high school in Jember, East Java. However, he only got serious about music when he was studying at the Islamic University of Bandung by joining Doel Sumbang's studio. Around this time, Anang made a musical recording with Doel Sumbang, although it was not published.

He joined the hard rock/alternative rock band, Kidnap Katrina:[4] In 1989, Anang decided to move to Jakarta and became acquainted with Pay Siburian, a BIP guitarist who was still playing for Slank. Through Pay, Anang also joined the Gang Potlot social circle and later strengthened the Kidnap Katrina group founded by Massto[5] (Bimbim Slank's sister[6]) and Koko (sister of Kaka Slank[7]). Together with Kidnap Katrina, Anang released a self-titled album[8] with his hits entitled "Biru"[9] in 1993.

Going solo: After leaving Kidnap Katrina, Anang decided to go solo and released albums, including Letlah, Lepas, and Melayang. After he divorced Krisdayanti, he released his album, Separuh Jiwaku Pergi (Half of My Soul Go). He also duets with Syahrini in the song Jangan Memilih Aku (Don't Choose Me). This song managed to score a huge success. He then also sang a second duet, entitled Cinta Terakhir (The Last Love), with Syahrini.

In 2011, he ended his duet with Syahrini and took Ashanty as his new duet partner. Their relationship progressed from being just a duet of friends into lovers and eventually getting married. The couple Anang and Ashanty released an album entitled My Soulmate and gave birth to 2 hits, Determining My Heart and My Soulmate.

Apart from singing success, Anang is also a songwriter, arranger, and producer for several singers, Not only in the world of singing, Anang has also spread his wings in the world of acting by producing a film entitled "The Difficulty of Being a Virgin". This film is supported by Restu Sinaga, Nova Eliza, Al Fathir Muchtar, Olga Syahputra, Tio Pakusadewo, and Julia Perez.

== Personal life ==
Anang married Krisdayanti on August 22, 1996, together they have 2 children : Titania Aurelie Hermansyah and Azriel Akbar Hermansyah. However, their marriage has often been hit by gossip. In 2009, the couple divorced religiously in August, then legally divorced in November. Anang remarried to Ashanty, proposing to her on February 25, 2012. Together, Anang and Ashanty have 2 children : Arsy and Arsya.

== Discography ==
Album solo

- Biarkanlah (1992)
- Lepas (1994)
- Melayang (1996)
- Separuh Jiwaku Pergi (2009)

Album duet

- Jangan Memilih Aku (2010)
- Tanpa Bintang (2010)
- Jodohku (2011)
- Luar Biasa (2019)
- Cinta Tanpa Syarat (2021)
