= Meuthia Kasim =

Indonesian radio announcer (born 1968)

Meuthia "Mukas" Kasim (born August 19, 1968) is a radio announcer, radio personality, and entrepreneur in Indonesia. Meuthia judged in the first and second seasons of Indonesian Idol. During the second season of Indonesian Idol, Meuthia experienced a stroke and has since retired from all public events thus far.

== Personal life ==
Meuthia is married to Bimbom Barkah, head of Universal Music Indonesia.
