= Indonesian Idol season 9 =

Indonesian Idol
- Season 9
- Hosted by: Daniel Mananta
- Judges: Arman Maulana; Ari Lasso; Judika; Bunga Citra Lestari; Maia Estianty
- Winner: Maria Simorangkir
- Runner-up: Ahmad Abdul
- Finals venue: Ecovention Ocean Ecopark

Release
- Original network: RCTI
- Original release: December 18, 2017 – April 23, 2018

Season chronology
- ← Previous; Season 8 Next → Season 10

The ninth season of Indonesian Idol premiered on RCTI at the end of 2017 after a three-year hiatus. Registration opened 21 August. The main audition process was held in five major cities in Indonesia: Bandung, Yogyakarta, Surabaya, Medan and Jakarta.

This season was won by the youngest contestant from the history of Indonesian Idol, at 16 year-old, Maria Simorangkir, from Medan, North Sumatra with Ahmad Abdul as the runner-up.

== Hiatus ==
After the 10th anniversary of Indonesian Idol broadcasts, the show was replaced with The Voice Indonesia for the second season on RCTI, since the broadcast on Indosiar could not be extended and preferred to focus on the Dangdut contest. In the final year, FremantleMedia presented a new breakthrough singing contest, namely Just Duet, created alongside NET. However, as both events had decreased ratings, RCTI and FremantleMedia brought back Indonesian Idol for the ninth season.

== Hosts and judges ==
=== Host ===
- Daniel Mananta

=== Judges ===
The judges were:

- Ari Lasso
- Armand Maulana
- Bunga Citra Lestari
- Judika
- Maia Estianty

== Schedule auditions ==
=== Regional auditions ===
Cities audition	Date	Location	Golden tickets
Yogyakarta, DI Yogyakarta	18–19 September 2017	Jogja Expo Center	
Medan, North Sumatera	23–24 September 2017	Medan International Convention Center	
Surabaya, East Java	30 September-1 October 2017	BK3S	
Bandung, West Java	7–8 October 2017	Sasana Budaya Ganesha	
Jakarta, DKI Jakarta	14–16 October 2017	Jakarta International Expo	
Total number of golden tickets for elimination round			113

Terms contestants: Contestants must be 16–27 years old and lived in Indonesia

=== Special city auditions ===
In addition to big cities, Indonesian Idol also held auditions in several cities in Indonesia to move to the main audition (regional audition):

- Kupang
- Makassar
- Manado
- Malang
- Palembang
- Semarang
- Ambon
- Padang
- Purwokerto
- Banjarmasin
- Cirebon
- Balikpapan
- Sukabumi

== Elimination round ==
Held at the Studio 4 of RCTI for the third straight year, the first day of the elimination round featured the 113 contestants from the auditions round singing solo a cappella. 50 contestants advanced. The next round required the contestants to split up into 10 groups and perform. 26 of them advanced to the finals of the elimination round requiring a solo performance with a full band. 20 of them made it to the Top 20 show where the judges take contestants one by one and tell them if they made the final 20.

== Semi-finalist ==
The following is a list of Top 20 semi-finalists who failed to reach the finals:

Contestant	Age	Occupation	Hometown
Amevia Adhila Putri	17	High School Student	Yogyakarta
Billy Wino	24	Singer	Ambon, Maluku
Elvan Saragih	19	College Student	Jakarta
Irine Septiani	25	Background Singer	Jakarta
Jouharotul Khoiriyyah	20	College Student	Surabaya, East Java
M. Ilham	21	College Student	Jakarta
Naomi Harahap	26	Lawyer	Medan, North Sumatra
Vallen Raturamis	23	Singer	Manado, North Sulawesi

== Finalist ==
The following is the list of Top 20 semi-finalists who succeed to reach the finals:

Contestant	Age	Occupation	Hometown
Ahmad Abdul	27	Graphic Designer / Musician	Denpasar, Bali
Ayu Putrisundari	19	College Student	Yogyakarta
Bianca Jodie	21	Restaurant Marketing	Yogyakarta
Chandra Wahyudi	24	Street Musician	Samarinda, East Kalimantan
Ghea Indrawari	19	College Student	Singkawang, West Kalimantan
Glen Samuel	21	College Student / Singer	Jayapura, Papua
Joanita Veroni	20	College Student	Kaimana, West Papua
Kevin Aprillio	17	High School Student	Yogyakarta
Maria Simorangkir	16	High School Student	Medan, North Sumatra
Marion Jola	17	High School Student	Kupang, East Nusa Tenggara
Mona Magang	20	College Student	Atambua, East Nusa Tenggara
Withney Julinetha	16	High School Student	Ambon, Maluku

== Semi-finals ==
=== Showcase Round ===
The top 20 Show was divided into two nights and aired live on 15 and 16 January 2018 at 9:00 p.m. The contestants performed songs of their choice (there was no particular theme) with twelve contestants performed on the first night, and the other performed on the second night along with the result. Ten contestants with most vote advanced automatically to the Spectacular Show, and then each judges would pick one contestant left to compete along the Top 10. There were 20 semi-finalists, twelve females and eight males.

==== Showcase Round Night 1 ====
Order	Contestant	Song (Original Artist)	Result
1	Amevia Putri Adhila	"Jangan Gila" (Bunga Citra Lestari)	Eliminated
2	Glen Samuel	"How Long" (Charlie Puth)	Armand's choice
3	Ahmad Abdul	"This Town" (Niall Horan)	Advanced
4	Vallen Raturamis	"Dia" (Anji)	Eliminated
5	Elvan Saragih	"Terjebak Nostalgia" (Raisa)	Eliminated
6	Bianca Jodie	"Bukti" (Virgoun)	Advanced
7	Naomi Harahap	"It's All Coming Back to Me Now" (Celine Dion)	Ari's Choice
8	Joanita Veroni	"Runnin' (Lose It All)" (Naughty Boy feat. Beyoncé & Arrow Benjamin)	Advanced
9	Chandra Wahyudi	"Pergilah Kasih" (Chrisye)	Judika's choice
10	Irine Septiani	"Hanya Cinta yang Bisa" (Agnez Mo feat. Titi DJ)	Eliminated
11	Withney Julinetha	"Masterpiece" (Jessie J)	Advanced
12	Maria Simorangkir	"Don't You Worry 'bout a Thing" (Stevie Wonder)	Maia's choice

==== Showcase Round Night 2 ====
Order	Contestant	Song (Original Artist)	Result
1	M. Ilham Nahumarury	"Perfect Strangers" (Jonas Blue & JP Cooper)	Eliminated
2	Kevin Aprilio	"Cukup Tahu" (Rizky Febian)	Advanced
3	Mona Magang	"Best Thing I Never Had" (Beyoncé)	Advanced
4	Ayu Putrisundari	"Attention" (Charlie Puth)	Advanced
5	Jauharotul Khoiriyyah	"Yank" (Wali)	Bunga's choice
6	Marion Jola	"Dekat di Hati" (RAN)	Advanced
7	Ghea Indrawari	"Akad" (Payung Teduh)	Advanced
8	Billy Wino	"Kekasih Bayangan" (Cakra Khan)	Advanced

=== Top 15 Show ===
The semifinalists once again took the stage to compete the 12 tickets to the Spectacular Show. The one night show took place on 22 January 2018 at 9:00 pm (UTC−5 9:00 am) live. The Top 15 contestants performed the songs of their choice and no particular theme introduced yet. Ten contestants with the most votes advanced to the Spectacular Show along with two contestants chosen by judges as a wildcard contestants.

Order	Contestant	Song (Original Artist)	Result
1	Mona Magang	"Beautiful" (Christina Aguilera)	Advanced
2	Jauharotul Khoiriyyah	"Fana Merah Jambu" (Fourtwnty)	Eliminated
3	Chandra Wahyudi	"Nakal" (Gigi)	Advanced
4	Billy Wino	"Berharap Tak Berpisah" (Reza Artamevia)	Eliminated
5	Ayu Putrisundari	"Chained to the Rhythm" (Katy Perry feat. Skip Marley)	Wildcard
6	Maria Simorangkir	"Tears" (Clean Bandit feat. Louisa Johnson)	Advanced
7	Withney Julinetha	"Jangan Hilangkan Dia" (Rossa)	Advanced
8	Ghea Indrawari	"Dear Future Husband" (Meghan Trainor)	Advanced
9	Kevin Aprillo	"Dewi" (Dewa 19)	Wildcard
10	Bianca Jodie	"Perfect" (Ed Sheeran)	Advanced
11	Ahmad Abdul	"Cinta dan Benci" (Geisha)	Advanced
12	Marion Jola	"Damn I Love You" (Agnez Mo)	Advanced
13	Naomi Harahap	"Back to You" (Louis Tomlinson feat. Bebe Rexha)	Eliminated
14	Glenn Samuel	"Talking to the Moon" (Bruno Mars)	Advanced
15	Joanita Veroni	"Whole Lotta Woman" (Kelly Clarkson)	Advanced

== Finals ==
=== Top 12 - Indonesian Idols ===
Episode	Order	Contestant	Song (Original artist)	Result
Spectacular Show 1 (Monday, January 29)	1	Kevin Aprilio	"Sadis" (Afgan)	Advanced
Spectacular Show 1 (Monday, January 29)	2	Mona Magang	"Cinta Pertama dan Terakhir" (Sherina)	Eliminated
Spectacular Show 1 (Monday, January 29)	3	Withney Julinetha	"Malaikat Juga Tahu" (Dewi 'Dee' Lestari)	Bottom 3
Spectacular Show 1 (Monday, January 29)	4	Maria Simorangkir	"Apakah Ini Cinta" (Judika)	Advanced
Spectacular Show 1 (Monday, January 29)	5	Joanita Veroni	"Mencintaimu" (Krisdayanti)	Advanced
Spectacular Show 1 (Monday, January 29)	6	Ahmad Abdul	"Rahasia Hati" (Element)	Advanced
Spectacular Show 1 (Monday, January 29)	7	Ghea Indrawari	"Kangen" (Dewa 19)	Advanced
Spectacular Show 2 (Tuesday, January 30)
Spectacular Show 2 (Tuesday, January 30)	8	Glen Samuel	"Cinta Kan Membawamu Kembali" (Dewa 19)	Bottom 3
Spectacular Show 2 (Tuesday, January 30)	9	Bianca Jodie	"Penyendiri" (Nadya Fatira)	Advanced
Spectacular Show 2 (Tuesday, January 30)	10	Marion Jola	"Firasat" (Marcell Siahaan)	Advanced
Spectacular Show 2 (Tuesday, January 30)	11	Ayu Putrisundari	"Jaran Goyang" (Nella Kharisma)	Advanced
Spectacular Show 2 (Tuesday, January 30)	12	Chandra Wahyudi	"I'm Sorry Goodbye" (Krisdayanti)	Advanced

=== Top 11 - Expect the Unexpected / Audition Songs ===
Episode	Order	Contestant	Song (Original Artist)	Result
Spectacular Show 3 (Monday, February 5)	1	Joanita Veroni	"Trouble" (Iggy Azalea featuring Jennifer Hudson)	Safe
Spectacular Show 3 (Monday, February 5)	2	Ayu Putrisundari	"Pamit" (Tulus)	Safe
Spectacular Show 3 (Monday, February 5)	3	Bianca Jodie	"Broken Vow" (Lara Fabian)	Safe
Spectacular Show 3 (Monday, February 5)	4	Kevin Aprilio	"Sayang" (Via Vallen)	Safe
Spectacular Show 3 (Monday, February 5)	5	Chandra Wahyudi	"Bebaskan Diriku" (Armada)	Bottom 3
Spectacular Show 3 (Monday, February 5)	6	Withney Julinetha	"Firework" (Katy Perry)	Eliminated
Spectacular Show 3 (Monday, February 5)	7	Marion Jola	"Work" (Rihanna featuring Drake)	Safe
Spectacular Show 3 (Monday, February 5)	8	Maria Simorangkir	"This Is What You Came For" (Calvin Harris featuring Rihanna)	Safe
Spectacular Show 3 (Monday, February 5)	9	Ghea Indrawari	"Isn't She Lovely" (Stevie Wonder)	Safe
Spectacular Show 3 (Monday, February 5)	10	Glen Samuel	"Strip That Down" (Liam Payne featuring Quavo)	Bottom 3
Spectacular Show 3 (Monday, February 5)	11	Ahmad Abdul	"Don't Look Back in Anger" (Oasis)	Safe
Spectacular Show 4 (Tuesday, February 6)
Spectacular Show 4 (Tuesday, February 6)	1	Ghea Indrawari	"Issues" (Julia Michaels)	Safe
Spectacular Show 4 (Tuesday, February 6)	2	Kevin Aprilio	"Ain't No Sunshine" (Bill Withers)	Safe
Spectacular Show 4 (Tuesday, February 6)	3	Ayu Putrisundari	"Blue Suede Shoes" (Elvis Presley)	Safe
Spectacular Show 4 (Tuesday, February 6)	4	Glen Samuel	"Lay Me Down" (Sam Smith)	Bottom 3
Spectacular Show 4 (Tuesday, February 6)	5	Ahmad Abdul	"Lost Stars" (Adam Levine)	Safe
Spectacular Show 4 (Tuesday, February 6)	6	Marion Jola	"Siapkah Kau 'tuk Jatuh Cinta Lagi" (HIVI!)	Safe
Spectacular Show 4 (Tuesday, February 6)	7	Withney Julinetha	"Mamma Knows Best" (Jessie J)	Eliminated
Spectacular Show 4 (Tuesday, February 6)	8	Maria Simorangkir	"Sampai Habis Air Mataku" (Novita Dewi)	Safe
Spectacular Show 4 (Tuesday, February 6)	9	Joanita Veroni	"Love On Top" (Beyoncé)	Safe
Spectacular Show 4 (Tuesday, February 6)	10	Chandra Wahyudi	"The Second You Sleep" (Saybia)	Bottom 3
Spectacular Show 4 (Tuesday, February 6)	11	Bianca Jodie	"Side to Side" (Ariana Grande)	Safe

=== Top 10 - Solo / Duet ===
For the first time in the Spectacular Show, all the finalists took a solo and duet performance with other finalist.

Episode	Order	Contestant	Song (Original Artist)	Result
Spectacular Show 5 (Monday, February 12)	1	Ayu Putrisundari	"Stressed Out" (Twenty One Pilots)	Safe
Spectacular Show 5 (Monday, February 12)	2	Marion Jola	"Moving On" (Andien)	Safe
Spectacular Show 5 (Monday, February 12)	3	Maria Simorangkir	"Note to God" (JoJo)	Safe
Spectacular Show 5 (Monday, February 12)	4	Bianca Jodie	"True Colors" (Cyndi Lauper)	Bottom 3
Spectacular Show 5 (Monday, February 12)	5	Ghea Indrawari	"Adventure of a Lifetime" (Coldplay)	Safe
Spectacular Show 5 (Monday, February 12)	6	Chandra Wahyudi	"Cukup Siti Nurbaya" (Dewa 19)	Safe
Spectacular Show 5 (Monday, February 12)	7	Kevin Aprilio	"Stay with Me" (Sam Smith)	Eliminated
Spectacular Show 5 (Monday, February 12)	8	Joanita Veroni	"Could You Be Loved" (Bob Marley and the Wailers)	Safe
Spectacular Show 5 (Monday, February 12)	9	Ahmad Abdul	"Wild Thoughts" (DJ Khaled featuring Rihanna and Bryson Tiller)	Safe
Spectacular Show 5 (Monday, February 12)	10	Glen Samuel	"Mirrors" (Justin Timberlake)	Bottom 3
Spectacular Show 6 (Tuesday, February 13)
Spectacular Show 6 (Tuesday, February 13)	1	Bianca Jodie & Glen Samuel	"Surat Cinta Untuk Starla" (Virgoun)	N/A
Spectacular Show 6 (Tuesday, February 13)	2	Ahmad Abdul & Ghea Indrawari	"Dari Mata" (Jaz)	N/A
Spectacular Show 6 (Tuesday, February 13)	3	Chandra Wahyudi & Maria Simorangkir	"Mengejar Matahari" (Ari Lasso)	N/A
Spectacular Show 6 (Tuesday, February 13)	4	Kevin Aprilio & Marion Jola	"Buktikan" (Dewi Sandra with Rayen Pono)	N/A
Spectacular Show 6 (Tuesday, February 13)	5	Ayu Putrisundari & Joanita Veroni	"Come Together" (The Beatles)	N/A

- Guest performer(s): Anne-Marie ("Rockabye" & "Friends")

=== Top 9 - This Is Me ===
Due to Miss Indonesia 2018 final night on Friday, February 23 that held on the same studio as Indonesian Idol this season, the Top 9 finalists only sang one time on Monday show and there wasn't Tuesday show as usual. The results was also announced at the end of the Monday show.

Episode	Order	Contestant	Song (Original Artist)	Result
Spectacular Show 7 (Monday, February 19)	1	Bianca Jodie	"In the Name of Love" (Martin Garrix featuring Bebe Rexha)	Safe
Spectacular Show 7 (Monday, February 19)	2	Glen Samuel	"Treasure" (Bruno Mars)	Safe
Spectacular Show 7 (Monday, February 19)	3	Chandra Wahyudi	"Tua Tua Keladi" (Anggun)	Eliminated
Spectacular Show 7 (Monday, February 19)	4	Ahmad Abdul	"Monokrom" (Tulus)	Bottom 3
Spectacular Show 7 (Monday, February 19)	5	Ayu Putrisundari	"Déjà Vu" (Beyoncé)	Bottom 3
Spectacular Show 7 (Monday, February 19)	6	Marion Jola	"Dangerous Woman" (Ariana Grande)	Safe
Spectacular Show 7 (Monday, February 19)	7	Maria Simorangkir	"Kecewa" (Bunga Citra Lestari)	Safe
Spectacular Show 7 (Monday, February 19)	8	Ghea Indrawari	"I'm Yours" (Jason Mraz)	Safe
Spectacular Show 7 (Monday, February 19)	9	Joanita Veroni	"Respect" (Aretha Franklin)	Safe

=== Top 8 - Songs About Love ===
Episode	Order	Contestant	Song (Original Artist)	Result
Spectacular Show 8 (Monday, February 26)	1	Ahmad Abdul	"Kiss Me" (Sixpence None the Richer)	Safe
Spectacular Show 8 (Monday, February 26)	2	Joanita Veroni	"Jangan Cintai Aku Apa Adanya" (Tulus)	Safe
Spectacular Show 8 (Monday, February 26)	3	Marion Jola	"Pupus" (Dewa 19)	Bottom 3
Spectacular Show 8 (Monday, February 26)	4	Bianca Jodie	"Sambalado" (Ayu Ting Ting)	Safe
Spectacular Show 8 (Monday, February 26)	5	Ghea Indrawari	"Aku Cinta Kau dan Dia" (Ahmad Band)	Safe
Spectacular Show 8 (Monday, February 26)	6	Ayu Putrisundari	"Haruskah Ku Mati" (ADA Band)	Safe
Spectacular Show 8 (Monday, February 26)	7	Maria Simorangkir	"Cinta di Ujung Jalan" (Agnez Mo)	Bottom 3
Spectacular Show 8 (Monday, February 26)	8	Glen Samuel	"Beauty and a Beat" (Justin Bieber)	Eliminated

=== Top 7 - Original Soundtrack ===
Episode	Order	Contestant	Song (original artist)	Result
Spectacular Show 9 (Monday, March 5)	1	Ayu Putrisundari	"Writing's on the Wall" (Sam Smith)	Safe
Spectacular Show 9 (Monday, March 5)	2	Ghea Indrawari	"How Far I'll Go" (Auliʻi Cravalho)	Safe
Spectacular Show 9 (Monday, March 5)	3	Marion Jola	"Toxic" (Britney Spears)	Safe
Spectacular Show 9 (Monday, March 5)	4	Maria Simorangkir	"Never Enough" (Loren Allred)	Safe
Spectacular Show 9 (Monday, March 5)	5	Ahmad Abdul	"Starving" (Hailee Steinfeld & Grey featuring Zedd)	Safe
Spectacular Show 9 (Monday, March 5)	6	Joanita Veroni	"Biru" (Vina Panduwinata)	Bottom 2
Spectacular Show 9 (Monday, March 5)	7	Bianca Jodie	"Skyscraper" (Demi Lovato)	Eliminated

- Guest performer(s): Shane Filan ("Need You Now" with Top 7 finalists & "Heaven")

=== Top 6 - Songs from 21st Century ===
Episode	Order	Contestant	Song (original artist)	Result
Spectacular Show 10 (Monday, March 12)	1	Joanita Veroni	"Tell Me You Love Me" (Demi Lovato)	Safe
Spectacular Show 10 (Monday, March 12)	2	Marion Jola	"Ciao Adios" (Anne Marie)	Eliminated
Spectacular Show 10 (Monday, March 12)	3	Ghea Indrawari	"Somewhere Only We Know" (Keane)	Safe
Spectacular Show 10 (Monday, March 12)	4	Ayu Putrisundari	"Finesse" (Bruno Mars featuring Cardi B)	Bottom 2
Spectacular Show 10 (Monday, March 12)	5	Ahmad Abdul	"History" (One Direction)	Safe
Spectacular Show 10 (Monday, March 12)	6	Maria Simorangkir	"Irreplaceable" (Beyonce)	Safe
Spectacular Show 10 (Monday, March 12)	7	Ayu Putrisundari, Joanita Veroni, Maria Simorangkir	"Bang Bang" (Jessie J, Ariana Grande, Nicki Minaj)	N/A
Spectacular Show 10 (Monday, March 12)	8	Ahmad Abdul, Ghea Indrawari, Marion Jola	"Uptown Funk" (Mark Ronson featuring Bruno Mars)	N/A

- Guest performer(s): Jonatan Cerrada ("Lelaki Lain di Hati")

=== Top 5 - Millenial Collaborations / Sing For Your Life ===
Each contestants sang one solo and one EDM duet with young Indonesian music producers / composers.

Episode	Order	Contestant	Song (original artist)	Result
Spectacular Show 11 (Monday, March 19)	1	Maria Simorangkir & Irsan Ramadhan	"Kala Cinta Menggoda" (Chrisye)	Safe
Spectacular Show 11 (Monday, March 19)	2	Ghea Indrawari & Osvaldo Rio	"Sewindu" (Tulus)	Eliminated
Spectacular Show 11 (Monday, March 19)	3	Ayu Putrisundari & Ananta Vinnie	"Separuh Nafas" (Dewa 19)	Bottom 3
Spectacular Show 11 (Monday, March 19)	4	Ahmad Abdul & Eka Gustiwana	"Masih Ada" (Ello)	Safe
Spectacular Show 11 (Monday, March 19)	5	Joanita Veroni & Alffy Rev	"Khayalan Tingkat Tinggi" (Noah)	Bottom 3
Spectacular Show 11 (Monday, March 19)	6	Ghea Indrawari	"Tiba-Tiba Cinta Datang" (Maudy Ayunda)	Eliminated
Spectacular Show 11 (Monday, March 19)	7	Ahmad Abdul	"You Are the Reason" (Calum Scott)	Safe
Spectacular Show 11 (Monday, March 19)	8	Ayu Putrisundari	"Rapuh" (Agnez Mo)	Bottom 3
Spectacular Show 11 (Monday, March 19)	9	Joanita Veroni	"This Is Me" (Keala Settle)	Bottom 3
Spectacular Show 11 (Monday, March 19)	10	Maria Simonrangkir	"Domino" (Jessie J)	Safe

=== Top 4 - Judges Collaborations / Top of the Charts ===
Each contestant will perform one hit song and one duet with the judges. Ahmad Abdul paired with Bunga Citra Lestari, Ayu Putrisundari paired with Ari Lasso, Joanita Veroni with Armand Maulana, and Maria Simorangkir got to sing with Judika.

Episode	Order	Contestant	Song (original artist)	Result
Spectacular Show 12 (Monday, March 26)
Spectacular Show 12 (Monday, March 26)	1	Ahmad Abdul & Bunga Citra Lestari	"Karena Ku Cinta Kau" (Bunga Citra Lestari)	Bottom 2
Spectacular Show 12 (Monday, March 26)	2	Ayu Putrisundari & Ari Lasso	"Aku dan Dirimu" (Ari Lasso featuring Bunga Citra Lestari)	Eliminated
Spectacular Show 12 (Monday, March 26)	3	Joanita Veroni & Armand Maulana	"Tunggu di Sana" (Armand Maulana)	Safe
Spectacular Show 12 (Monday, March 26)	4	Maria Simorangkir & Judika	"Jikalau Kau Cinta" (Judika)	Safe
Spectacular Show 12 (Monday, March 26)	5	Joanita Veroni	"Proud Mary" (Ike & Tina Turner)	Safe
Spectacular Show 12 (Monday, March 26)	6	Maria Simorangkir	"I Don't Want to Miss a Thing" (Aerosmith)	Safe
Spectacular Show 12 (Monday, March 26)	7	Ahmad Abdul	"Ku Menunggu" (Rossa)	Bottom 2
Spectacular Show 12 (Monday, March 26)	8	Ayu Putrisundari	"Killing Me Softly with His Song" (Fugees)	Eliminated

- Guest Performer(s): Rossa ("Pernah Memiliki" & "Terlalu Cinta" with Top 4 finalists)

=== Top 3 (first week) - Superstar Duet / Contestant's Choice ===
The finalists will have to do a duet one more time, but right now they paired with Indonesian superstar, Yura for Ahmad Abdul, Krisdayanti for Joanita Veroni, and Kotak for Maria Simorangkir. There wasn't any elimination this week, instead, the Top 3 will have to sing one more time next week during "Road to Grand Finale".

Episode	Order	Contestant	Song (original artist)	Result
Spectacular Show 13 (Monday, April 2)
Spectacular Show 13 (Monday, April 2)	1	Maria Simorangkir & Kotak	"Terbang" (Kotak)	Safe
Spectacular Show 13 (Monday, April 2)	2	Ahmad Abdul & Yura	"Cinta dan Rahasia" (Yura featuring Glenn Fredly)	Safe
Spectacular Show 13 (Monday, April 2)	3	Joanita Veroni & Krisdayanti	"Mahadaya Cinta" (Krisdayanti)	Safe
Spectacular Show 13 (Monday, April 2)	4	Ahmad Abdul	"Shut Up and Dance" (Walk the Moon)	Safe
Spectacular Show 13 (Monday, April 2)	5	Maria Simorangkir	"New Rules" (Dua Lipa)	Safe
Spectacular Show 13 (Monday, April 2)	6	Joanita Veroni	"I Want You Back" (The Jackson 5)	Safe

- Group Performance: "Pesta" (Top 3 finalists)
- Guest Performer(s): Kotak ("Mati Rasa")

=== Top 3 (second week) - Road to Grand Finale ===
The contestants each sang one song that represents their type of music they want to take in their careers, and one duet with Indonesian newcomer, Rizky Febian.

Episode	Order	Contestant	Song (original artist)	Result
Spectacular Show 14 (Monday, April 9)
Spectacular Show 14 (Monday, April 9)	1	Joanita Veroni	"Jailhouse Rock" (Elvis Presley)	Eliminated
Spectacular Show 14 (Monday, April 9)	2	Maria Simorangkir	"I Have Nothing" (Whitney Houston)	Safe
Spectacular Show 14 (Monday, April 9)	3	Ahmad Abdul	"Better Man" (Robbie Williams)	Safe
Spectacular Show 14 (Monday, April 9)	4	Joanita Veroni & Rizky Febian	"Cukup Tau" (Rizky Febian)	Eliminated
Spectacular Show 14 (Monday, April 9)	5	Ahmad Abdul & Rizky Febian	"Kesempurnaan Cinta" (Rizky Febian)	Safe
6	Maria Simorangkir & Rizky Febian	"Penantian Berharga" (Rizky Febian)	Safe	

- Group Performance: "Feels" (Rizky Febian with Top 3 finalists)
- Guest Performer(s): The Script ("Superheroes", "Breakeven", "The Man Who Can't Be Moved" and "Hall of Fame")

=== Grand Finale - Ballad / Yovie's Songbook / Jevin's Collaborations / Winning Song ===
The finalists each sang one ballad song that represents their personality, one duet with Indonesian composer / producer, Yovie Widianto, one EDM duet with Indonesian newcomer producer / beatboxer, Jevin Julian, and each finalist's winning song.

Episode	Order	Contestant	Song (original artist)
Grand Finale Show (Monday, April 16)
Grand Finale Show (Monday, April 16)	1	Ahmad Abdul	"Fix You" (Coldplay)
Grand Finale Show (Monday, April 16)	2	Maria Simorangkir	"My Heart Will Go On" (Celine Dion)
Grand Finale Show (Monday, April 16)	3	Ahmad Abdul & Yovie Widianto	"Peri Cintaku / Suratku" (Marcell / Hedi Yunus)
Grand Finale Show (Monday, April 16)	4	Maria Simorangkir & Yovie Widianto	"Bukan Untukku / Mantan Terindah" (Rio Febrian / Kahitna)
Grand Finale Show (Monday, April 16)	5	Maria Simorangkir & Jevin Julian	"Risalah Hati" (Dewa 19)
Grand Finale Show (Monday, April 16)	6	Ahmad Abdul & Jevin Julian	"Cobalah Mengerti" (Noah)
Grand Finale Show (Monday, April 16)	7	Maria Simorangkir	"Yang Terbaik"
8	Ahmad Abdul	"Yang Terbaik"	

- Group Performance:
  - "Idola Indonesia" (Maria & Abdul feat. Indonesian Idol All Stars)
  - "Rise" (Maria & Abdul)
- Guest Performer(s):
  - "Kemenangan Hati" (Ihsan Tarore, Rini Wulandari, Citra Scholastika, Regina Ivanova, Nowela Auparay feat. Yovie Widianto)
  - "And I'm Telling You I'm Not Going" (Regina Ivanova)
  - "Because You Loved Me" (Rini Wulandari)
  - "Wrecking Ball" (Nowela Auparay)
  - "Menghujam Jantungku" (Citra Scholastika)
  - "Bento" (Ihsan Tarore)
  - "Ekspresi" (Nowela Auparay, Regina Ivanova, Citra Scholastika, Rini Wulandari, dan Ihsan Tarore)
  - "You Don't Have To Go" (Citra Scholastika)

=== Result and Reunion - Finalist's Favourite / Legends' Mashups ===
The finalists each sang one of their favourite song in their life, and one duet with Indonesian legendary singers, Glenn Fredly and Sandhy Sondoro. People voted based on last week's performances (Grand Finale) and these performances.

Episode	Order	Contestant	Song (original artist)	Result
Result & Reunion Show (Monday, April 23)
Result & Reunion Show (Monday, April 23)	1	Ahmad Abdul	"Won't Go Home Without You" (Maroon 5)	Runner-up
Result & Reunion Show (Monday, April 23)	2	Maria Simorangkir	"Stand Up For Love" (Destiny's Child)	Winner
Result & Reunion Show (Monday, April 23)	3	Maria Simorangkir & Sandhy Sondoro	"Tak Pernah Padam / Gejolak Cinta" (Sandhy Sondoro / Indah Dewi Pertiwi feat. Sandhy Sondoro)	Winner
4	Ahmad Abdul & Glenn Fredly	"Kasih Putih / Hikayat Cintaku" (Glenn Fredly / Glenn Fredly feat. Dewi Persik)	Runner-up	

- Group Performance:
  - "Karena Cinta" (Glenn Fredly feat. Top 10 Indonesian Idol)
  - "Idola Indonesia" (Top 12 Indonesian Idol)
- Guest Performer(s):
  - "Sayang" (Kevin Aprilio & Via Vallen)
  - "Firasat" (Via Vallen)
  - "Haruskah Ku Mati" (Ayu Putrisundari & Donnie Sibarani)
  - "Cinta Kan Membawamu Kembali" (Glen Samuel & Reza Artamevia)
  - "Kau" (Mona Magang, Withney Julinetha, Joanita Veroni & Saykoji)
  - "Dekat Di Hati" (Marion Jola & RAN)
  - "That's What I Like" (Marion Jola)
  - "Adam Hawa" (Chandra Wahyudi & Armada)
  - "Asal Kau Bahagia" (Ghea Indrawari, Bianca Jodie & Armada)

== Elimination chart ==
Females	Males	Top 20	Top 15	Wild Card	Winner

Did Not Participate	Top Vote	Safe First	Safe Last	Eliminated	Judges' Save (Note: This season, the judges decided to not use their Veto Rights.)

Stage:		Top 20	Top 15	Spectacular Show										Final
Week:		15-16/1 (Note: The final result was on January 16th, but on January 15th they revealed the Top 7 and Bottom 5.)	22/1	30/1	6/2	13/2	19/2	26/2	5/3	12/3	19/3	26/3	9/4	23/4
Place	Contestant	Result												
1	Maria Simorangkir	Top 15					Top 3	Bottom 3	Top 2	Top 2				Winner
2	Ahmad Abdul	Top 15			Top 3	Top 3	Bottom 3	Top 3		Top 2		Bottom 2		Runner-up
3	Joanita Veroni	Top 15	Top 3				Top 3		Bottom 2		Bottom 3		Elim	
4	Ayu Putrisundari	Top 15	Saved			Top 3	Bottom 3			Bottom 2	Bottom 3	Elim		
5	Ghea Indrawari	Top 15		Top 3		Top 3		Top 3			Elim			
6	Marion Jola	Top 15	Top 3	Top 3	Top 3			Bottom 3	Top 2	Elim				
7	Bianca Jodie	Top 15	Top 3	Top 3		Bottom 3	Top 3	Top 3	Elim					
8	Glen Samuel	Top 15		Bottom 3	Bottom 3	Bottom 3		Elim						
9	Chandra Wahyudi	Top 15			Bottom 3		Elim							
10	Kevin Aprilio	Top 15	Saved		Top 3	Elim								
11	Withney Julinetha	Top 15		Bottom 3	Elim									
12	Mona Magang	Top 15		Elim										
13	Billy Wino	Top 15	Elim											
14	Jauharotul Khoiriyyah	Top 15	Elim											
15	Naomi Harahap	Top 15	Elim											
16	Amevia Putri	Elim												
17	Elvan Saragih	Elim												
18	Irine Septiani	Elim												
19	Ilham Nahumarury	Elim												
20	Vallen Raturamis	Elim												

== Sponsor ==
- Grab
- Opera Mini
- Vivo Smart Phone
