= Ari Renaldi =

- Origin: Bandung, Indonesia
- Occupations: Music producer, Composer, Arranger, Music director, Mixing engineer, Sound engineer, Drummer

Ari Renaldi is an Indonesian music producer, composer, arranger, sound and mixing engineer, music director and musician. His production credits include Mocca, Tulus, Vidi Aldiano, Raisa Andriana, Afgan, Yura Yunita, Sezairi Sezali, Maudy Ayunda, Rossa, Ungu, Juicy Luicy, Yovie & Nuno amongst many others.

During college years, Renaldi started his career as session drummer for Project Pop, Glenn Fredly, Rio Febrian, R42 and many others. He is currently the drummer for 4Peniti, a jazz band based in Bandung and was formed in 2002 with Rudy Zulkarnaen (simakDialog), Ammy Kurniawan and Zaki 'Peniti'. Renaldi is a member of 2010 and 2012 Mix With The Masters series.

Beside record producing, Renaldi have done music directing for concerts and live performances as well. He is the music director for all of Tulus major performances, including 2015 and 2017 Java Jazz International Festival, 2016 San Francisco US Live and other eight solo concerts (Tulus: An Introduction, Beyond Sincere, Diorama, Gajah Concert Tour, Konser Monokrom Malaysia, Bandung, Jakarta) from 2011 to 2015 in Bandung, Jakarta and Yogyakarta cities in Indonesia. He is also the music director for Tulus at the collaboration concert between Ari Lasso and Tulus titled "Dua Ruang" held at Istora Senayan, Jakarta on October 4, 2015.

== Achievements ==
On 2015 at the 18th Anugerah Musik Indonesia (AMI) Awards, an annual Indonesian major music awards, he won four AMI awards for Best of the Best Album, Best of the Best Production Work, Best Pop Album and Best Mix Engineer out of seven nominations, mostly for his works with Tulus in Gajah album in which he acts as the album producer. In 2008, he also won an AMI Award for Best Alternative Production Works with Mocca in Colours album.

In 2017, he won all AMI awards for the top categories including Best of the Best Album, Best of the Best Production Work, Best Pop Album, Best Sound Production Team and Best Soul/R&B/Urban Album. At the latest 2019 AMI Award, he again received AMI Award for Best Pop Album Producer for his work with Yura Yunita in Merakit Album and Best Sound Production Team for Adu Rayu (Yovie Widianto, Tulus, Glenn Fredly), one of the most highly appreciated single of the year in Indonesia. Until 2019, Renaldi has won 13 awards and been nominated 25 times by AMI Awards.

His works often receive positive reviews and recognition, especially "Gajah" and "Yura" albums which was ranked the 1st and 6th in the 20 Best Album of 2014 by Rolling Stone Indonesia magazine in addition to their nominations as Best Pop Album and Best Soul/R&B Album in the 2015 AMI Awards. "Gajah" album was also listed among the top 9 Indonesian albums by Tempo magazine.

In addition, four of his produced singles, namely Jatuh Hati (Raisa), Cinta dan Rahasia (Yura Yunita), 1000 Tahun Lamanya (Tulus) dan Teman Hidup (Tulus) were published as Top 10 Indonesian Songs 2015 by one of the biggest social media company, Path Indonesia.

=== Anugerah Musik Indonesia Award ===
Renaldi's Anugerah Musik Indonesia (Indonesian Music Awards) wins and nominations are:

Year	AMI Award Nominee	Category	Result	Total wins	Total Nominations
2022	Hati-Hati di Jalan (Tulus)	Best of The Best Production Work (Producer)	Won	7	17
2022	Tutur Batin (Yura Yunita)	Best of The Best Production Work (Producer)	Nominated	7	17
2022	Manusia (Tulus)	Best of The Best Album (Producer)	Won	7	17
2022	Tutur Batin (Yura Yunita)	Best of The Best Album (Producer)	Nominated	7	17
2022	Ari Renaldi - Hati-Hati di Jalan (Tulus)	Best Record Producer	Won	7	17
2022	Ari Renaldi - Tujuh Belas (Tulus)	Best Record Producer	Nominated	7	17
2022	Ari Renaldi - Hati-Hati di Jalan (Tulus)	Best Sound Production Team	Won	7	17
2022	Ari Renaldi - Dunia Tipu-Tipu (Yura Yunita)	Best Sound Production Team	Nominated	7	17
2022	Ari Renaldi - Tujuh Belas (Tulus)	Best Sound Production Team	Nominated	7	17
2022	Muhammad Tulus, Ari Renaldi - Hati-Hati di Jalan (Tulus)	Best Pop Songwriter	Nominated	7	17
2022	Ari Renaldi - Hati-Hati di Jalan (Tulus)	Best Pop Music Arranger	Won	7	17
2022	Manusia (Tulus)	Best Pop Album (Producer)	Won	7	17
2022	Tutur Batin (Yura Yunita)	Best Pop Album (Producer)	Nominated	7	17
2022	Sahabat Dulu (Prinsa Mandagie)	Best Original Soundtrack Production Work (Producer)	Won	7	17
2022	Tak Kan Hilang (Budi Doremi)	Best Original Soundtrack Production Work (Producer)	Nominated	7	17
2022	Diri (Tulus)	Best Folk/Country/Ballad Production Work (Producer)	Nominated	7	17
2022	Bandung (Yura Yunita)	Best Regional Language Song Production Work (Producer)	Nominated	7	17
2021	Berisik (Dere)	Best Folk/Country/Ballad Production Work	Won	1	5
2021	Ari Renaldi - Duhai Sayang (Yura Yunita)	Best Pop Music Arranger	Nominated	1	5
2021	Ari Renaldi - The Heart You Hurt (Hati Yang Kau Sakiti - Korean Version) (Rossa)	Best Rearranged Production Work	Nominated	1	5
2021	Ari Renaldi, Harmoko Aguswan - Kota (Dere)	Best Sound Production Team	Nominated	1	5
2021	Ari Renaldi - Duhai Sayang (Yura Yunita)	Best Record Producer	Nominated	1	5
2019	Ari Renaldi - Adu Rayu (Yovie Widianto, Tulus, Glenn Fredly)	Best Sound Production Team	Won	2	5
2019	Ari Renaldi - Labirin (Tulus)	Best Sound Production Team	Nominated	2	5
2019	Merakit (Yura Yunita)	Best Pop Album (Producer)	Won	2	5
2019	Labirin (Tulus)	Best Record Producer	Nominated	2	5
2019	Labirin (Tulus)	Best of The Best Production Work (Producer)	Nominated	2	5
2018	Ari Renaldi - Harus Bahagia (Yura Yunita)	Best Pop Music Arranger	Won	1	2
2018	Ari Renaldi - Aku Sedang Mencintaimu (Maudy Ayunda)	Best Sound Production Team	Nominated	1	2
2017	Monokrom (Monokrom - Tulus)	Best of The Best Production Work (Producer)	Won	5	6
2017	Monokrom (Tulus)	Best of The Best Album (Producer)	Won	5	6
2017	Monokrom (Tulus)	Best Soul/R&B/Urban Album (Producer)	Won	5	6
2017	Ari Renaldi / Tulus Company - Monokrom (Tulus)	Best Album Record Producer	Won	5	6
2017	Ari Renaldi / Rudy Zulkarnaen - Monokrom (Tulus)	Best Sound Production Team	Won	5	6
2017	Ari Renaldi / Anggi Anggoro - Cinta Dalam Hidupku (Rossa)	Best Sound Production Team	Nominated	5	6
2016	Pamit (Tulus)	Best of The Best Production Work (Producer)	Nominated	0	3
2016	Ari Renaldi - Pamit (Tulus)	Best Pop Record Producer	Nominated	0	3
2016	Tulus & Ari 'Aru' Renaldi - Pamit (Tulus)	Best Pop Songwriter	Nominated	0	3
2015	Jangan Cintai Aku Apa Adanya (Gajah - Tulus)	Best of The Best Production Work (Producer)	Won	4	7
2015	Gajah (Tulus)	Best of The Best Album (Producer)	Won	4	7
2015	Gajah (Tulus)	Best Pop Album (Producer)	Won	4	7
2015	Yura (Yura Yunita)	Best Soul/R&B Album (Producer)	Nominated	4	7
2015	Ari Renaldi - Gajah (Gajah - Tulus)	Best Pop Record Producer	Nominated	4	7
2015	Ari Renaldi - 1000 Tahun Lamanya (Tulus)	Best Mix Engineer	Won	4	7
2015	Ari Renaldi - Bayangkan Rasakan (Moments - Maudy Ayunda)	Best Mix Engineer	Nominated	4	7
2012	Teman Pesta (Tulus - Tulus)	Best Alternative Production Work (Producer)	Nominated	0	1
2008	The Best Thing (Colours - Mocca)	Best Alternative Production Work (Producer)	Won	1	1
				21	47

=== Bandung Music Award ===
Year	Bandung Music Award Nominee	Category	Result
2022	Ari Renaldi - Tutur Batin (Yura Yunita)	Best Mix Engineer	Won

=== Anugerah Industri Muzik (AIM) Award ===
Year	Nominated work/Recipient	Award	Result
2022	Simon Khoo, Ari Renaldi, Aubrey Suwito - Belagu (Dayang Nurfaizah)	Best Album Record	Won
2022	Simon Khoo, Ari Renaldi, Aubrey Suwito - Tudung Periuk (Dayang Nurfaizah)	Best Song Record	Won
2022	Simon Khoo, Ari Renaldi, Aubrey Suwito - Malam Ku Bermimpi (Dayang Nurfaizah)	Best Song Record	Nominated

=== Anugerah Planet Muzik (APM) Award ===
Year	Nominated work/Recipient	Award	Result
2016	Pamit (Monokrom - Tulus)	APM Most Popular Song	Nominated
2016	Pamit (Monokrom - Tulus)	Best Song (Indonesia)	Nominated
2015	Jangan Coba Berlari (Sezairi)	Best Collaboration (Song)	Won
2015	Satu Hari Di Bulan Juni (Gajah - Tulus)	APM Most Popular Song	Nominated
2014	Jangan Cintai Aku Apa Adanya (Gajah - Tulus)	Best Song (Indonesia)	Nominated

== Production Discography ==
=== Single/Song ===
Ari Renaldi has been credited as producer and arranger and/or mixing engineer on the following songs:

Year	Song / Single (Artist)	Credit	Song Recognition
2024	Ai no Chiisana Uta (Moona Hoshinova)	Mix Engineer	
2024	High Tide (Moona Hoshinova)	Mix Engineer	
2024	Taut Hati (Moona Hoshinova)	Composer, Producer, Arranger, Mix engineer	
2023	Tak Istimewa (Ify Alyssa)	Producer, Arranger, Mix engineer	
2023	Sejuta Miliar Dunia (Sheemar & Melanie Putria)	Producer, Arranger, Mix engineer	
2023	Hujan (Arsy Widianto, Ziva Magnolya)	String Arranger, Mix engineer	
2023	Kita Dan Doa (Andmesh Kamaleng)	Producer, Arranger, Mix engineer	
2023	Ku Tak Tahu Apa Yang Kau Inginkan (Bilal Indrajaya)	Producer, Arranger, Mix engineer	
2023	Cinta Tlah Terlambat (Stevan Pasaribu)	Composer, Producer, Arranger, Mix engineer	
2023	sebentar. (Najmi Niery)	Mix engineer	
2023	Lihatlah Lebih Dekat (Yura Yunita)	Producer, Arranger, Mix engineer	
2023	Menyesal (Yovie Widianto, Lyodra, Tiara Andini, Ziva Magnolya)	String Arranger, Mix engineer	
2023	I Am (Kafin Sulthan)	Producer, Arranger, Mix engineer	
2023	Roda-Roda (Ify Alyssa)	Producer, Arranger, Mix engineer	
2023	Teringat Selalu (Tetty Kadi)	Producer, Arranger, Mix engineer	
2023	Misal (Yovie & Nuno)	Producer, Arranger, Mix engineer	
2023	Jiwa Yang Bersedih (Ghea Indrawari)	Mix Engineer	
2023	Masa Mudaku Habis (Ghea Indrawari)	Mix Engineer	
2023	Ekspektasi (Aruma, Raim Laode)	Mix Engineer	
2023	Menyapa Dunia (Dato Sri' Siti Nurhaliza)	Mix Engineer	
2023	Sehebat Matahari (Dato Sri' Siti Nurhaliza)	Mix Engineer	
2023	Jika Bisa Kulupa (Tiara Effendy)	Mix Engineer	
2023	Menanti (Ziva Magnolya)	Mix Engineer	
2023	Mencoba Pergi - OST. Ganjil Genap (Tiara Effendy)	Mix Engineer	
2023	Lebih Indah (The Groove)	Mix Engineer	
2023	Self Soothing (Sezairi, album)	Mix Engineer	
2023	Tak Mungkin (KIM)	Mix Engineer	
2023	Bersamamu (Jaz Hayat)	Mix Engineer	
2023	Who's Toxic? It's You! (Moona Hoshinova)	Composer, Producer, Arranger, Mix engineer	
2023	Bertengkar Manis (Rossa, Barsena Bestandhi)	Producer, Arranger, Mix engineer	
Semesta Menari (Ify Alyssa)	Producer, Arranger, Mix engineer		
2022	Perisai Jitu (Moona Hoshinova)	Composer, Producer, Arranger, Mix engineer	
2022	Kau (Angel Pieters)	Strings Arranger	
2022	dekati. (Najmi Niery)	Mix engineer	
2022	Peri Cintaku (Ziva Magnolya)	Strings arranger, Mix engineer	
2022	Hati-Hati Di Jalan (Tulus)	Composer, Producer, Arranger, Mix engineer	
2022	Tutur Batin (Yura Yunita)	Producer, Arranger, Mix engineer	
2022	Tak Akan Hilang (Budi Doremi)	Producer, Arranger, Mix engineer	
2022	Tujuh Belas (Tulus)	Producer, Arranger, Mix engineer	
2022	Merasa Indah (Tiara Andini)	Strings arranger, Mix engineer	
Dara (Vidi Aldiano)	Producer, Arranger, Mix engineer		
2021	Benang-Benang Asmara (Andien)	Producer, Arranger, Mix engineer	
2021	Mencintai Hati Yang Tak Cinta (Arsy Widianto)	Mix engineer	
2021	Sahabat Dulu (Prinsa Mandagie)	Producer, Arranger, Mix engineer	
2021	Rumah Yang Baru (Mawar De Jongh, Adikara Fardy, Dee Lestari)	Producer, Arranger, Mix engineer	
2021	Ingkar (Tulus)	Composer, Producer, Arranger, Mix engineer	
2021	Memilih Aku (Arsy Widianto & Tiara Andini)	Strings arranger, Mix engineer	
2021	Not For Us (Maudy Ayunda)	Producer, Arranger, Mix engineer	
2021	Heartless (Maudy Ayunda)	Producer, Arranger, Mix engineer	
2021	Don't Know Why (Maudy Ayunda)	Producer, Arranger, Mix engineer	
2021	Leave And Goodbye (Titi Radjo Padmaja)	Mix engineer	
2021	Sajadah Panjang (Yovie & Nuno)	Producer, Arranger, Mix engineer	
2021	Berisik (Dere)	Producer, Arranger, Mix engineer	2021 AMI Award winner for Best Folk/Country/Ballad Production Work
2021	Bulan Yang Baik (Sal Priadi)	Producer, Arranger, Mix engineer	
2021	Ragu (Raisa)	Composer	
2021	Cinta Seperti Aku (Aurelie Hermansyah)	Mix engineer	
2021	Tari Tualang Tiga (Dayang Nurfaizah)	Mix engineer	
2021	Tak Seindah Wajah (Dayang Nurfaizah)	Mix engineer	
2021	Jikalau Abang Merindu (Dayang Nurfaizah)	Mix engineer	
2021	Gurindam Jiwa (Dayang Nurfaizah, Hael Husaini)	Mix engineer	
2021	Dikirim Jangan Dipesan Jangan (Dayang Nurfaizah)	Mix engineer	
2021	Malam Ku Bermimpi (Dayang Nurfaizah)	Mix engineer	
2021	Tudung Periuk (Dayang Nurfaizah)	Mix engineer	
2021	Bahaya (Korean version) (Arsy Widianto, Tiara Andini)	Strings arranger, Mix engineer	
2021	Bahaya (Arsy Widianto, Tiara Andini)	Strings arranger, Mix engineer	
2021	Padamu Luka (Arsy Widianto)	Mix engineer	
2021	Diam-Diam (Arsy Widianto, Tiara Andini)	Mix engineer	
2021	Cintanya Aku (Arsy Widianto, Tiara Andini)	Strings arranger, Mix engineer	2021 AMI Award Winner for Best Pop Songwriter; 2021 AMI Award Nominee for Best Pop Music Arranger; 2021 AMI Award Nominee for Best Collaboration Production Work
2021	Tanya (Dere)	Mix engineer	
2021	Arti Mencinta (Rieka Roslan)	Mix engineer	
2020	Cintai (Tanpa Patah Hati) (Aaliyah Massaid)	Mix engineer	
2020	Kota (Dere)	Mix engineer	2021 AMI Award Nominee for Best Sound Production Team
2020	Duhai Sayang (Yura Yunita)	Producer, Arranger, Mix engineer	2021 AMI Award Nominee for Best Record Producer; 2021 AMI Award Nominee for Best Pop Music Arranger
2020	Beside Me (Abirama)	Producer, Arranger, Mix engineer	
2020	I'm Better Off (Sandrina Sitohang)	Producer, Arranger, Mix engineer	
2020	The Heart You Hurt (Hati Yang Kau Sakiti - Korean Version) (Rossa)	Producer, Arranger, Mix engineer	2021 AMI Award Nominee for Best Rearranged Production Work
2020	Tentang Kamu (Lyodra Ginting)	Arranger, Mix engineer	2021 AMI Award Nominee for Best Pop Female Artist
2020	Honestunes (Grace Sahertian feat. Ayub Jonn, Shotgun Dre, Aryo Wismoyo	Mix engineer	
2020	Irama Laot Teduh (Sal Priadi)	Producer, Arranger, Mix engineer	
2020	Adaptasi (Tulus)	Mix engineer	
2020	Mengapa Kita #TerlanjurMencinta (Lyodra Ginting)	Co-producer, String Arranger, Mix engineer	
2020	Maafkan Aku #TerlanjurMencinta (Tiara Andini)	String Arranger, Mix engineer	
2020	Tak Sanggup Melupa #TerlanjurMencinta (Ziva Magnolya)	Mix engineer	
2020	Cerita Cinta (Arsy Widianto)	Mix engineer	
2020	Masih (Rossa)	String arranger, Mix engineer	
2020	Bertahan Lewati Senja (Vidi Aldiano)	Producer, Arranger, Mix engineer	
2020	Kisah Indah (Devano Danendra)	Producer, Arranger, Mix engineer	
2020	Malam Sepi (Yura Yunita)	Producer, Arranger, Mix engineer	
2020	You Are Too Beautiful (Elfa Zulham feat. Teddy Adhitya)	Mix engineer	
2020	Sungguh Rindu (Mario Ginanjar)	Producer, Arranger, Mix engineer	
2020	Rindu Dalam Hati (Arsy Widianto, Brisia Jodie)	Producer, Arranger, Mix engineer	
2020	Aku Cinta Dia (Ricky Lionardi x Andien)	Mix engineer	
2020	Daylight (Sandrina Sitohang)	Producer, Arranger, Mix engineer	
2019	Goodbye (Maudy Ayunda)	Producer, Arranger, Mix engineer	
2019	Bahagia Itu Sederhana ~ Shiawase wa Yattekuru (Hiroaki Kato)	Producer, Arranger, Mix engineer	
2019	Fonk In The city (Saxx In The city)	Mix engineer	
2019	Nada Sou Sou (Hiroaki Kato feat. Arina Ephipania)	Producer, Arranger, Mix engineer	
2019	Sejauh Dua Benua (Arsy Widianto, Brisia Jodie)	Mix engineer	
2019	Terang (Dato' Siti Nurhaliza)	Mix engineer	
2019	Karena Cinta Yang Menemani (Rossa) OST. Susi Susanti Love All	Producer, Arranger, Mix engineer	
2019	Janji (Lyla x Ghea Indrawari)	Producer, Arranger, Mix engineer	
2019	Percaya Aku (Chintya Gabriella)	Arranger, Mix Engineer	
2019	Temani Aku (Maudy Ayunda)	Producer, Arranger, Mix engineer	
2019	Cinta Dan Rahasia - Orchestral Version (Yura Yunita)	Producer, Arranger, Mix engineer	
2019	Get Along With You - Piano Version (Yura Yunita)	Mix engineer	
2019	Get Along With You - Studio Version (Yura Yunita)	Mix engineer	
2019	Mawar Jingga (Juicy Luicy)	Producer, Arranger, Mix engineer	
2019	Adu Rayu (Yovie Widianto, Tulus, Glenn Fredly)	String Arranger, Mix engineer	2019 AMI Award Winner for Best of The Best Production Work; 2019 AMI Award Winner for Best Collaboration Production Work; 2019 AMI Award Winner for Best Pop Arranger; 2019 AMI Award Winner for Best Sound Production Team; 2019 AMI Award Winner for Best Record Producer; 2019 AMI Award Nominee for Best Pop Songwriter
2019	Kasihku Selamanya (Dato' Siti Nurhaliza)	Mix engineer	
2019	Pertemuan Semu (Fabian Winandi)	Mix engineer	
2019	Sepenuh Hatiku (M.E. Voices)	Mix engineer	
2019	Pesona Cinta (Adikara Fardy)	Producer, Arranger, Mix engineer	
2018	Berlayar Kembali (D'Cinnamons)	Producer, Arranger, Mix engineer	
2018	Natsu Wa Kinu (Tulus)	Producer, Arranger, Mix engineer	
2018	Planet Tempat Ku Sembunyi (Arsy Widianto)	Producer, Arranger, Mix engineer	
2018	Shouri No Uta (Hiroaki Kato)	Mix Engineer	
2018	Dreamer (Diastika)	Producer, Arranger, Mix engineer	
2018	Buka Hati (Yura Yunita)	Producer, Arranger, Mix engineer	2019 AMI Award Winner for Best Pop Female Artist
2018	Hari Bahagia (Astrid feat. Anji)	Producer, Arranger, Mix engineer	
2018	Labirin (Tulus)	Producer, Arranger, Mix engineer	2019 AMI Award Winner for Best Urban Male/Female Artist; 2019 AMI Award Nominee for Best of The Best Production Work; 2019 AMI Award Nominee for Best Sound Production Team
2018	Takkan Apa (Yura Yunita)	Producer, Arranger, Mix engineer	
2018	Kesempatan (Diastika)	Composer, Producer, Arranger, Mix engineer	
2018	Kulari Ke Pantai (RAN)	Mix engineer	2018 AMI Award Nominee for Best Pop Duo/Group/Vocal Group/Collaboration; 2018 AMI Award Nominee for Best Original Soundtrack Production Work
2018	Jakarta Sunset (Hiroaki Kato)	Producer, Arranger, Mix engineer	
2018	Dengan Caraku (Arsy Widianto, Brisia Jodie)	Producer, Arranger, Mix engineer	2018 AMI Award Winner for Best Pop Duo/Group/Vocal Group/Collaboration
2018	Terluka (Armand Maulana)	Producer, Arranger, Mix engineer	
2018	Pekat (Yura Yunita)	Mix engineer	
2018	Langit Abu-abu - Accapela version (Tulus)	Producer, Arranger, Mix engineer	
2018	Aku Sedang Mencintaimu (Maudy Ayunda)	Producer, Arranger, Mix engineer	2018 AMI Award Nominee for Best Sound Production Team; 2018 AMI Award Nominee for Best Pop Female Artist
2018	Harus Bahagia (Yura Yunita)	Producer, Arranger, Mix engineer	2018 AMI Award Winner for Best Pop Music Arranger; 2018 AMI Award Winner for Best Pop Female Artist; 2018 AMI Award Winner for Best Pop Songwriter
2018	Bukan Cinta Biasa - Dekade Version (Afgan)	Producer, Arranger, Mix engineer	
2018	Nembak #MenyatakanCinta (Arsy Widianto)	Producer, Arranger, Mix engineer	
2018	Ruang Rindu (Hiroaki Kato feat. Noe "Letto")	Producer, Arranger, Mix engineer	
2018	Jumpa Ketiga (Ghaniyya)	Mix engineer	
2018	Teman Bahagia (Jaz)	Mix engineer	
2018	Cinta Surga (Anang & Ashanty)	Producer, Arranger, Mix engineer	
2018	Cinta 99% (Dea)	Producer, Arranger, Mix engineer	
2017	Masih Berharap (Isyana Sarasvati)	Producer, Arranger, Mix engineer	
2017	Tukar Jiwa (Tulus)	Composer, Producer, Arranger, Mix engineer	
2017	Kau Yang Sembunyi (Hanin Dhiya)	Producer, Arranger, Mix engineer	
2017	Cinta 99% (Dea Dalila)	Producer, Arranger, Mix engineer	
2017	Cuma Kamu (Ila Damiaa)	Producer, Arranger, Mix engineer	
2017	Aku Bukan Malaikat (Siti Nurhaliza)	Mix engineer	
2017	Monokrom (Tulus)	Composer, Producer, Arranger, Mix engineer	2017 AMI Award Winner for Best of The Best Production Work; 2017 AMI Award Winner for Best Sound Production Team; 2017 AMI Award Winner for Best Soul/R&B/Urban Artist
2017	Kejar Mimpi (Maudy Ayunda)	Producer, Arranger, Mix engineer	
2017	Kasmaran (Jaz Hayat)	Producer, Arranger, Mix engineer	
2017	Hara Tanah (Nidji)	Producer, Arranger, Mix engineer	
2017	Buatmu Tertawa (Hiroaki Kato)	Producer, Arranger, Mix engineer	
2017	Cinta Dalam Hidupku (Rossa)	Producer, Arranger, Mix engineer	2017 AMI Award Nominee for Best Sound Production Team; 2017 AMI Award Nominee for Best Original Soundtrack Production Work
2017	Surat (Fabian Winandi)	Producer, Arranger, Mix engineer	
2017	Rencana Besar (Sheryl Sheinafia)	Producer, Arranger, Mix engineer	
2017	Sebatas Teman Saja (Sheryl Sheinafia)	Producer, Arranger, Mix engineer	
2016	Tanda Mata (Glenn Fredly)	Producer, Arranger, Mix engineer	
2016	Intuisi (Yura Yunita)	Producer, Arranger, Mix engineer	2017 AMI Award Winner for Best Pop Songwriter; 2017 AMI Award Winner for Best Pop Female Artist
2016	Ruang Sendiri (Tulus)	Composer, Producer, Arranger, Mix engineer	
2016	Berlalu (Afgan)	Producer, Arranger, Mix engineer	
2016	Kunci Hati (Afgan)	Producer, Arranger, Mix engineer	
2016	Dari Mata (Jaz Hayat)	Mix engineer	
2016	Masa Kecilku (Clarice Cutie)	Mix engineer	
2016	Bukan Untuk Sembarang Hati (Anang & Ashanty)	Producer, Arranger, Mix engineer	
2016	Jangan Lupakan (Bisma Karisma)	Producer, Arranger, Mix engineer	
2016	Woohoo! (Ruth Sahanaya)	Producer, Arranger	
2016	Pamit (Tulus)	Composer, Producer, Arranger, Mix engineer	2016 AMI Award Winner for Best Pop Male Artist; 2016 AMI Award Nominee for Best of The Best Production Work; 2016 AMI Award Nominee for Best Pop Recording Producer; 2016 AMI Award Nominee for Best Pop Songwriter; 2016 APM Award Nominee for Most Popular Song; 2016 APM Award Nominee for Best Song (Indonesia)
2015	セパトゥ〜くつ〜 (Tulus)	Producer, Arranger, Mix engineer	
2015	Percayalah (Afgan & Raisa)	Producer, Arranger, Mix engineer	
2015	Kalau Bukan Cinta Apalagi (Agus Hafi)	Producer, Arranger, Mix engineer	
2015	Aku Cinta Dia Yang Cinta Pacarnya (Juicy Luicy)	Producer, Arranger, Mix engineer	
2015	Jatuh Hati (Raisa)	Producer, Arranger, Mix engineer	
2015	Jangan Coba Berlari (Sezairi)	Producer, Arranger, Mix engineer	
2015	Knock Me Out (Afgan)	Mix engineer	
2015	Turis (Lyla)	Producer, Arranger, Mix engineer	
2015	Cinta Sekali Saja (Noura)	Producer, Arranger, Mix engineer	
2015	Bayangkan Rasakan (Maudy Ayunda)	Mix engineer	
2015	Untuk Apa (Maudy Ayunda)	Producer, Arranger, Mix engineer	
2015	Arloji (Maudy Ayunda)	Producer, Arranger, Mix engineer	
2015	Sekali Lagi (Maudy Ayunda)	Producer, Arranger, Mix engineer	
2015	Pogo! Pogo! (Ungu)	Producer, Arranger, Mix engineer	
2015	Andai Aku Bisa (Ungu)	Producer, Arranger, Mix engineer	
2015	Segala Puji Syukur (Ungu)	Producer, Arranger, Mix engineer	
2014	1000 Tahun Lamanya (Tulus)	Producer, Arranger, Mix engineer	
2014	Demi Hati (Angela Nazar)	Producer, Arranger, Mix engineer	
2013	Pupus/Kasih Tak Sampai (Vidi Aldiano)	Producer, Arranger, Mixing	

=== Album ===
Ari Renaldi has been credited as producer, arranger and/or mixing engineer on the following albums:

Year	Album - Artist	Track	Credit	Recognition
2023	Another Journey : The Beginning - Rossa	02. Wanita; 03. Masih; 06. The Heart You Hurt (Hati Yang Kau Sakiti Korean Version); 07. Bertengkar Manis	Producer, Arranger, Mix engineer	
2022	Manusia - Tulus	01. Tujuh Belas; 02. Kelana; 03. Remedi; 04. Interaksi; 05. Ingkar; 06. Jatuh Suka; 07. Nala; 08. Hati-Hati Di Jalan; 09. Diri; 10. Satu Kali	Composer, Producer, Arranger, Mix engineer	
2021	Tutur Batin - Yura Yunita	02. Bandung; 04. Mau Kemana; 07. Tutur Batin; 08. Duhai Sayang	Composer, Producer, Arranger, Mix engineer	
2021	Jalan Ajaib - 4Peniti	01. Soundcheck; 02. Mau Untung Jadi Buntung; 03. Bagus; 04. Di HadapanMu (Aku Kecil); 05. Diam; 06. Semua Karena Kau; 07. Membuatmu Jatuh Cinta; 08. Jalan Ajaib	Composer, Co-Producer, Co-Arranger, Mix engineer	
2019	Langsung Dari Konser Monokrom Jakarta (Live) - Tulus	01. Pembuka - Live; 02. Baru - Live; 03. Jatuh Cinta - Live; 04. Gajah - Live; 05. Ruang Sendiri - Live; 06. Tukar Jiwa - Live; 07. Cahaya - Live; 08. Bumerang - Live; 09. Medley: Teman Pesta / Kisah Sebentar - Live; 10. Labirin - Live; 11. Monokrom - Live; 12. Langit Abu - Abu - Live; 13. Tergila - Gila - Live; 14. Mahakarya - Live; 15. Teman Hidup - Live; 16. Sepatu - Live; 17. Jangan Cintai Aku Apa Adanya - Live; 18. Sewindu - Live; 19. Pamit - Live; 20. Lagu Untuk Matahari - Live; 21. Manusia Kuat - Live	Composer, Producer, Arranger, Mix engineer	
2018	Katakanlah Cinta - Naura	Karena Kamu Artinya Cinta (Sentuhan Ibu); Katakanlah Cinta; Selamanya Untukmu (#TemanNaura); Who You Are	Mix Engineer	
2018	Merakit - Yura Yunita	Takkan Apa; Apakah Kamu; Buka Hati; Kata Hilang Makna; Dekap; Intuisi; Harus Bahagia; Merakit; Malam Sepi	Producer, Arranger, Mix engineer	2019 AMI Award Winner for Best Pop Album; 2019 AMI Award Nominee for Best of The Best Album
2017	Surat - Fabian Winandi	Surat; Not Tonight; Pelipur Lara; Insepsi; Makna; Terhapus Pagi; Dengar Suara (feat. Ginda Bestari); We Are Family; Langit	Mix engineer	
2017	Hiroaki Kato - Hiroaki Kato	Minami Kaze; Buatmu Tertawa; Ruang Rindu (feat. Noe "LETTO"); Musik; Beda Selera; My Everything; Jakarta Sunset; Happy!; Terima Kasih; Nada Sousou (feat. Arina "MOCCA")	Producer, Arranger, Mix engineer	
2016	Monokrom - Tulus	Manusia Kuat; Pamit; Ruang Sendiri; Tukar Jiwa; Tergila - gila; Cahaya; Langit Abu-abu; Mahakarya; Lekas; Monokrom	Composer, Producer, Arranger, Mix engineer	2017 AMI Award Winner for Best of The Best Album; 2017 AMI Award Winner for Best of Album Recording Producer; 2017 AMI Award Winner for Best Soul/R&B/Urban Album; 2016 Rolling Stone Best Album of The Year #10
2016	Sezairi (EP) - Sezairi Sezali	Intro; Terrified (feat. THELIONCITYBOY); Empty; It Will Never Mend; Better Than	Producer, Arranger, Mix engineer	
2015	Fabian - Fabian Winandi	Showtime; Sturara; Mengapa; Mimpi; Bisakah Kuhentikan Waktu; Have Fun Baby; Senyum Untukmu; Inilah Musikku; Showtime (English Version)	Producer, Arranger, Mix engineer	
2014	Yura - Yura Yunita	Balada Sirkus; Keruh Di Air Jenuh; Cinta dan Rahasia; Jester Suit; Superlunar; Get Along With You; Itu Kamu; Kataji; Berawal Dari Tatap	Producer, Arranger, Mix engineer	
2014	Gajah - Tulus	Baru; Bumerang; Sepatu; Bunga Tidur; Tanggal Merah; Gajah; Lagu Untuk Matahari; Satu Hari di Bulan Juni; Jangan Cintai Aku Apa Adanya	Producer, Arranger, Mix engineer	2016 AMI Award Winner for Best of The Best Album; 2016 AMI Award Winner for Best Pop Album; 2014 Rolling Stone Indonesia 20 Best Album of The Year #1
2014	Home - Mocca	Good Morning Song; Bandung (Flower City); Building Memories; Last Piece; Somewhere In My Dreamland; Stars in Your Eyes; Imaginary Girlfriend; You're The Man; Bundle of Joy; Changing Fate; Home; Goodnight Song (Outro)	Mix engineer	
2014	It's All Yours - Tesla Manaf	A Man's Relationship With His Fragile Area; Necrophilia; Counting Miles & Smiles; Movin Side; Early Years; Multiply By Zero; Chin Up; The Sweetest Horn; It's All Yours: Part 1; It's All Yours: Part 2; It's All Yours: Part 3; It's All Yours: Part 4; It's All Yours: Part 5; It's All Yours: Part 6	Mix engineer	
2011	Tulus - Tulus	Merdu Untukmu (Intro); Teman Pesta; Kisah Sebentar; Sewindu; Diorama (Studio Live); Tuan Nona Kesepian; Jatuh Cinta; Teman Hidup; Sewindu (Rhodes version); Merdu Untukmu (Outro)	Producer, Arranger, Mix engineer	
2007	Colours - Mocca	Love You Anyway; You Don't Even Know Me; You've Cheated On Me; Dear Diary; You; Do What You Wanna Do; Seven Days Ago; The Best Thing; Hyper-Ballad; Sing; The Object Of My Affection; Let Me Go; Ode For The Loves One	Co-producer, Mix engineer	
2006	4Peniti - 4Peniti	Tiada; Menari Bumi; Cinta Ini Sepanjang Hidupku; Anak Nakal; Bebek & Sapi; Indah Damai	Co-producer, Co-arranger, Mix engineer	
2005	OST. Untuk Rena - Mocca	Sebelum Kau Tidur; Hanya Satu; Friend; Happy; Sunday Afternoon (akustik)	Co-producer, Mix engineer	
2004	Friends - Mocca	On The Night Like This; I Think I'm In Love; My Only One; Friends; Lucky Man; I Would Never (feat. Karolina Komstedt of Club 8); You And Me Against The World; Buddy Zeus; This Conversation (feat. Bob Tutupoly); How Wonderful Life Would Be; Swing It Bob! Feat (feat. Bob Tutupoly); Its Over Now; Me And My Boyfriend (Acoustic)	Co-producer, Mix engineer	

=== Mixing credits ===
Ari Renaldi has been credited as mix engineer in the following albums and songs:

- 2016: The Groove - Forever U'll Be Mine (album)
- 2015: Maudy Ayunda - Moments (album)
- 2015: Ungu - Mozaik (album)
- 2013: Vidi Aldiano - Dunia Baru
- 2013: The Soul Of Magnolia - Bintang (album)
- 2011: Liyana Fizi - Between The Lines (album)
- 2006: Rieka Roslan - Bercerita (album)

== Concert Production Credit ==
- 2019: TULUS Festival Sewindu Jakarta, as music director and Drums
- 2019: TULUS Sewindu Tour Indonesia (Malang, Solo, Yogyakarta), as music director and Drummer
- 2019: TULUS Sewindu Tour Kuala Lumpur, as music director and Drums
- 2019: YURA Merakit Konser Jakarta, as music director and Mixing Engineer
- 2019: YURA Merakit Intimate Concert Bandung, as music director and Mixing Engineer
- 2019: TULUS Konser Monokrom Jakarta, as music director and Drums
- 2018: TULUS Konser Monokrom Bandung, as music director and Drums
- 2018: TULUS Live at Istana Budaya Kuala Lumpur, as music director and Drums
- 2016: TULUS San Francisco US Live, as music director and Drums
- 2015: Konser Gajah TULUS Yogyakarta, as music director and Mixing Engineer
- 2014: Konser Gajah TULUS Jakarta, as music director and Mixing Engineer
- 2014: Konser Gajah TULUS Bandung, as music director and Mixing Engineer
- 2013: Konser Diorama TULUS, Bandung, as music director and Mixing Engineer
- 2012: TULUS: Beyond Sincere Concert Bandung, as music director and Mixing Engineer
- 2011: TULUS: An Introduction, Bandung as music director and Mixing Engineer
