= Java Soulnation =

- Genre: R&B; hip hop; rap; soul
- Location: Istora Senayan (2008-2013)
- Years active: 2008-2013
- Founders: Java Festival Production
- Website: www.javasoulnation.com

Java Soulnation was a music festival concept offering youth-characterized music (R&B, hip hop, rap and soul) in Jakarta, Indonesia. It was announced in 2014 that the festival was merged with Java Rockin'land into Java Soundsfair.

== 2008 ==
The first Java Soulnation was held at Istora Senayan, Jakarta, Indonesia on 17 and 18 October 2008.

Line-Up

Headliner(s)
- Akon
- Ashanti
International performer(s)
- Blackalicious
- Blackstreet
- Che'Nelle
- DJ C-Bu
- DJ Tayone
- Iz & The Nufirm
- Rahsaan Patterson
- Thaitanium
- Tony Toni Tone
Local performer(s)
- Batik Tribe
- Cronik
- D'Essentials of Soul (featuring Maliq & D'Essentials, Ello, Cindy & Sania)
- DJ Ethnic
- Faro
- HIPHOPROCKS! (featuring The Flowers, Faro, Soul ID, Yacko, Fade to Black & DJ Flame)
- J-Flow
- Jamie Aditya Graham
- Mizta D
- Pandji
- RAN
- Saykoji
- Sonic Squad

== 2009 ==
The second edition was held at Istora Senayan for the second time and it was held on 30 & 31 October 2009. It was supported by national GSM mobile operator, Axis.

Line-Up

International performer(s)
- Arrested Development
- Atlantic Starr
- Corporate Lo-Fi
- DJ Moni
- DJ Spooky
- D.M.C.
- Jessica Mauboy feat. Iz
- Musiq Soulchild
- The Ting Tings
- Tortured Soul
Local performer(s)
- Aditya
- Aldisyah
- BATIK TRIBE feat. KINGSTONE
- Bondan Prakoso & Fade2Black
- Boogiemen
- Crystal Opera
- DJ Larry
- DJ Leno
- Home Grown
- IndonesiaUnite RISE feat. Glenn Fredly, Dewi Sandra, Yacko, JFlow
- J-Flow
- Joeniar Arief
- Konflik Live PA
- Maliq & D'Essentials
- Ndeesaster Live PA
- NEO
- Pesta Rap
- Rafi & The Beat feat. Cindy Bernadette & Abdul
- RAN
- Ras Muhammad
- SAI & The Funky Bunch
- Sevensoul
- T-Five
- The G
- X-Calibour
- Zamzam

== 2010 ==
The third edition was held at Istora Senayan, Jakarta, Indonesia and it was on 29 and 30 October 2010.

Line-Up

International performer(s)
- Akil & Louis Logic
- Coolio
- Les Nubians
- Raúl Midón
- Relax
- Simply Red
- Tambuco
Local performer(s)
- Bag & Beat
- Bayu Risa
- Boogieman & Homegrown
- Dira Sugandi
- Drew
- Ecoutez
- Electro Funk Latin feat DJ Max Don & Yeppy Romero
- Guntur
- Indonesia Youth Regeneration
- Jemima
- Pandji Pragiwaksono
- Rafi & The Beat
- Saba
- Sandhy Sondoro
- Sob
- Soul D'Soul Joeniar Arief feat. Lala Suwages & Soulmate
- Soul ID
- Soulvibe
- Tangga
- Tribute to Motown music by Barry Likumahuwa
- Yacko

== 2011 ==
The fourth edition was held at Istora Senayan, and it was held for three days for the first time, 23, 24 and 25 September 2011. It was supported by L.A. Lights.

Line-Up

International performer(s)
- Depapepe
- LMFAO
- Martin Denev Jazzawacka featuring Matthew Sayersz & Audrey Papilaya
- Mike Posner
- Naughty By Nature
- Nelly
- Public Enemy
- Sophie Ellis-Bextor
- Valerius
Local performer(s)
- Aditya
- Agrikulture
- Aktion To Reaktion + Massive Kontrol
- Amanda & Friends
- Andezzz
- Aonyx
- Back Alley
- Bag + Beat
- Bayu Risa
- Boogiemen
- Drew
- Easy Tiger
- EGRV
- Electro Funk Latin feat. Yeppy Romero, Dj Max Don & Imaniar
- Gamaliel Audrey Cantika
- Hi-Vi!
- Homogenic
- Hook
- Jemima
- Lala Suwages
- Local Drug Store
- Maliq & D'Essentials
- Marcell
- Matthew Sayersz
- Millane Fernandez
- Mjolnir
- Mobil Derek
- Radhini
- Raisa
- RAN
- Ras Muhammad
- Rock N Roll Mafia
- Roman Foot Soldier
- Sevensoul
- Shaggy Dog
- Sir. Dandy
- SOB
- Soulmate
- Space System
- T-Five
- Tangga
- The extraLARGE
- Tika And The Dessident
- Tribute to Amy Winehouse
- Tribute to Funk
- Twentyfirst Night
- Un Soiree
- Vibetronic `DYZTRK & Soulvibe
- Wizzow From Batik Tribe

== 2012 ==
The 2012 Java Soul Nation took place at Istora Senayan on 28, 29 and 30 September 2012. Once again, the event was supported by L.A. Lights.

Line-Up

Headliner(s)
- Scissor Sisters
- James Morrison
- Robin Thicke
International performer(s)
- Bone Thugs-n-Harmony
- Color Me Badd
- Hercules and Love Affair
- Jay Sean
- Theme Park
- Totally Enormous Extinct Dinosaurs
- Valerius
Local performer(s)
- Aditya
- Aldisyah
- Backalley
- Bayu Risa
- Bottlesmoker
- Bubugiri
- Dewi Sandra
- Dis & That
- Easy Tiger
- Ecoutez
- Endrumarch
- Gamaliel, Audrey & Cantika
- Hi-Vi
- Homogenic
- Horney Browney
- L.A. Lights Music Project
- Massive Control
- Matthew Sayersz
- Project 9 (RAN & Soulvibe)
- Rafi and The Beat Experience
- Raisa
- Rock n Roll Mafia
- Ron
- Sandhy Sondoro
- Soulmate
- Spice Girls Experience
- Stereocase
- Tulus
- Wisnu

== 2013 ==
The last edition of Java Soulnation took place at Istora Senayan on 4, 5 and 6 October 2013.

Line-Up

Headliner(s)
- Far East Movement
- Macy Gray
- Mamas Gun
International performer(s)
- All-4-One
- Alphamama
- Chef'Special
- Felix Zenger
- Go Chic
- Karmin
- Shane Filan
Local performer(s)
- Adera
- Adhitia Sofyan
- Aditya
- Agrikulture
- Art Of Tree
- Backalley tribute to Daft Punk
- Bayu Risa
- Bottlesmoker
- Dira Sugandi & Teza Sumendra
- Grace Sahertian
- Jamie Aditya
- L.A. Lights Music Project
- Lala
- Lala Suwages
- Matthew Sayersz
- Neonomora
- Neurotic
- Payung Teduh
- Project POP
- Raisa
- Rock N Roll Mafia
- Souljah
- Tangga
- Tulus
