= List of awards and nominations received by Tulus =

Tulus awards and nominations
Awards and nominations
Award	Wins	Nominations
Anugerah Musik Indonesia	17	35
Anugerah Planet Muzik	2	10
Dahsyatnya Awards	7	18
Hai Reader's Poll Music Awards	4	6
Indonesian Choice Awards	5	9
Rolling Stone Editor's Choice Awards	1	1

Totals (Note: Certain award groups do not simply award one winner. They acknowledge several different recipients, have runners-up, and have third place. Since this is a specific recognition and is different from losing an award, runner-up mentions are considered wins in this award tally. For simplification and to avoid errors, each award in this list has been presumed to have had a prior nomination.)
- Wins: 46
- Nominations: 97

Muhammad Tulus, who goes by the stage name Tulus, is an Indonesian singer-songwriter. He has released three albums: Tulus (2011), Gajah (2014) and Monokrom (2016). Gajah remained in the top 10 best selling albums of iTunes Asia for two consecutive months. In addition, the album was listed among the top 9 Indonesian albums by Tempo magazine.

In October 2014, Tulus performed at the 2014 Anugerah Planet Muzik in Singapore. The event was broadcast live in Malaysia and Indonesia. Tulus was named "Best New Artist (Male)" at the 2014 Anugerah Planet Muzik. In 2016, Tulus returning earning two nominations, including APM Most Popular Artist at the 2016 Anugerah Planet Muzik.

In September 2015, Tulus received nine nominations and won six awards, including "Best of the Best Album", "Best Pop Album", and "Best Pop Male Solo Artist" at the 2015 Anugerah Musik Indonesia.

== Anugerah Musik Indonesia ==
The Anugerah Musik Indonesia (English translation: Indonesian Music Awards), is an annual Indonesian major music award. They have been compared to the American Grammy Awards and British Brit Awards. It is the highest music award given to outstanding artists in Indonesia. Tulus has received thirteen awards from 22 nominations.

Year	Nominee / work	Award	Result	Ref.
2012	"Teman Pesta"	Best Alternative Production Work	Nominated	
2014	"Kita Bisa" (feat. RAN)	Best R&B/Soul Production Work	Nominated	
2015	"Jangan Cintai Aku Apa Adanya"	Best Pop Male Solo Artist	Won	
2015	"Jangan Cintai Aku Apa Adanya"	Best of the Best Production Work	Won	
2015	"Jangan Cintai Aku Apa Adanya"	Best Pop Songwriter	Won	
2015	"Gajah"	Best Pop Songwriter	Nominated	
2015	"Gajah"	Best Pop Recording Producer	Nominated	
2015	Gajah	Best Pop Album	Won	
2015	Gajah	Best of the Best Album	Won	
2015	"Baru"	Best R&B/Soul Male/Female Solo Artist	Nominated	
2015	"1000 Tahun Lamanya"	Best Mix Engineer	Won	
2016	"Pamit"	Best Pop Male Solo Artist	Won	
2016	"Pamit"	Best Pop Songwriter	Nominated	
2016	"Pamit"	Best Pop Recording Producer	Nominated	
2016	"Pamit"	Best of the Best Production Work	Nominated	
2016	"Para Pemenang" (feat. RAN)	Best Soul/R&B/Urban Group/Collaboration	Nominated	
2017	"Monokrom"	Best Soul/R&B/Urban Male/Female Solo Artist	Won	
2017	"Monokrom"	Best of the Best Production Work	Won	
2017	"Monokrom"	Best Mix Engineer	Won	
2017	Monokrom	Best Soul/R&B/Urban Album	Won	
2017	Monokrom	Best of the Best Album	Won	
2017	Monokrom	Best Recording Album Producer	Won	
2019	Labirin	Best Urban Pop Solo Artist	Won	
2019	Adu Rayu (feat. Glenn Fredly	Best of The Best Production Work	Won	
2019	Adu Rayu (feat. Glenn Fredly	Best Collaboration	Won	
2019	Adu Rayu (feat. Glenn Fredly	Best Songwriter	Nominated	
2020	Adaptasi	Best Pop Male Solo Artist	Nominated	
2022	Manusia	Best of The Best Album	Won	
2022	Manusia	Best Pop Album	Won	
2022	Hati-hati di Jalan	Best of The Best Production Work	Won	
2022	Hati-hati di Jalan	Best Pop Song	Won	
2022	Hati-hati di Jalan	Best Pop Male Solo Artist	Won	
2022	Hati-hati di Jalan	Best Pop Songwriter	Nominated	
2022	Hati-hati di Jalan	Best Music Video	Nominated	
2022	Diri	Best Folk/Country Song	Nominated	

== Anugerah Planet Muzik ==
The Anugerah Planet Muzik (English translation: Planet Music Awards) was an annual award given to the most popular artists from Indonesia, Singapore, and Malaysia. Tulus has received two awards from 10 nominations.

Year	Nominee / work	Award	Result	Ref.
2014	"Jangan Cintai Aku Apa Adanya"	Best New Artist (Male)	Won	
2014	"Jangan Cintai Aku Apa Adanya"	Best Song (Indonesia)	Nominated	
2015	"Jangan Coba Berlari" (Written and composed by Tulus)	Best Collaboration (Song)	Won	
2015	"Satu Hari di Bulan Juni"	APM Most Popular Song	Nominated	
2015	Tulus	APM Most Popular Artist	Nominated	
2016	Tulus	APM Most Popular Artist	Nominated	
2016	"Pamit"	APM Most Popular Song	Nominated	
2016	"Pamit"	Best Song (Indonesia)	Nominated	
2017	"Monokrom"	Best Song (Indonesia)	Nominated	
2017	"Monokrom"	Best Artist (Male)	Nominated	

== Ardan Group Awards ==
The Ardan Group Awards are an awards were presented by Ardan Group, to honour for musician who has the highest airplay in a year in four radio namely, Ardan Radio, Radio B, Radio Cakra and Solo Radio. Tulus has received one award.

Year	Nominee / work	Award	Result	Ref.
2013	Tulus (4745 times play in a year)	Most Widely Played Song	Won	

== Cornetto Pop Awards ==
The Cornetto Pop Awards are an annual awards were presented by brand Cornetto, to honour for talent musician in achievement music work. Tulus has received two awards.

Year	Nominee / work	Award	Result	Ref.
2017	Tulus	Favorite Pop Male Singer	Won	
2017	"Manusia Kuat"	Best Pop Music Video	Won	

== Dahsyatnya Awards ==
Presented on 2009, the Dahsyatnya Awards are annual awards presented by the daily Indonesian TV show Dahsyat that airs on RCTI, to be awarded for talent artists who become outstanding (Indonesian: Terdahsyat) in music and entertainment. Tulus has received seven awards from 18 nominations.

Year	Nominee / work	Award	Result	Ref.
2015	"Gajah"	Outstanding Song	Nominated	
2015	"Baru"	Outstanding Video Clip	Won	
2015	"Baru"	Outstanding Video Clip Director	Won	
2015	Tulus	Outstanding Male Solo Singer	Nominated	
2016	Tulus	Outstanding Male Solo Singer	Nominated	
2016	"Jangan Cintai Aku Apa Adanya"	Outstanding Video Clip	Won	
2016	"Jangan Cintai Aku Apa Adanya"	Outstanding Model Video Clip	Nominated	
2016	"Jangan Cintai Aku Apa Adanya"	Outstanding Video Clip Director	Nominated	
2017	"Ruang Sendiri"	Outstanding Video Clip Director	Nominated	
2017	Tulus	Outstanding Male Solo Singer	Nominated	
2017	"Pamit"	Outstanding Song	Nominated	
2017	"Pamit"	Outstanding Video Clip	Nominated	
2017	"Monokrom"	Outstanding Video Clip	Nominated	
2017	"Monokrom"	Outstanding Video Clip Director	Won	
2018	"Monokrom"	Outstanding Song	Won	
2018	Tulus	Outstanding Male Solo Singer	Won	
2018	"Tukar Jiwa"	Outstanding Video Clip	Won	
2018	"Manusia Kuat"	Outstanding Video Clip	Won	

== Global Seru Awards ==
The Global Seru Awards are awarded to celebrities who have caught the attention of the public through interesting or exciting accomplishments.

Year	Nominee / work	Award	Result	Ref.
2015	Tulus	Most Exciting Hit	Nominated	

== Hai Reader's Poll Music Awards ==
The Hai Reader's Poll Music Awards are an online awards to honour for talent artist in music. The awards show presented by Indonesian magazine Hai and using online voting. Tulus has received four awards from 6 nominations.

Year	Nominee / work	Award	Result	Ref.
2014	Gajah	The Best Album	Won	
2014	"Sepatu"	The Best Single	Nominated	
2014	Tulus	The Best Pop	Won	
2014	Tulus	The Best Male	Won	
2015	Tulus	The Best Male	Won	
2015	Konser Gajah	The Best Concert	Nominated	

== Indonesian Choice Awards ==
The Indonesian Choice Awards are an annual entertainment awards were presented by NET. since established in 2014, for honour for artists who had reached achievement in music, entertainment and movie. Tulus has received five awards from 9 nominations.

Year	Nominee / work	Award	Result	Ref.
2014	Gajah	Album of the Year	Nominated	
2014	"Sepatu"	Song of the Year	Nominated	
2014	Tulus	Male Singer of the Year	Won	
2016	Tulus	Male Singer of the Year	Won	
2017	Tulus	Male Singer of the Year	Won	
2017	Monokrom	Album of the Year	Won	
2017	"Ruang Sendiri"	Song of the Year	Won	
2017	"Monokrom"	Music Video of the Year	Won	
2018	"Manusia Kuat"	Music Video of the Year	Won	

== JawaPos.com Readers Choice Awards ==
The JawaPos.com Readers Choice Awards was an online awards have first established in 2017 by newspaper Jawa Pos, to honour for public figure in music, film and entertainment. Tulus has received one award.

Year	Nominee / work	Award	Result	Ref.
2017	Tulus	Favorite Male Singer	Won	

== Maya Awards ==
The Maya Awards (Indonesian translation: Piala Maya), is an annual Indonesian film award initiated in 2012 by Indonesian online film enthusiasts, that is initiated by @FILM_Indonesia Twitter account. Nominations and awards are given to each year's best local productions. Tulus has received two awards from 3 nominations.

Year	Nominee / work	Award	Result	Ref.
2014	"Lekas" (for film 3 Nafas Likas)	Best Theme Song	Nominated	
2016	"Ruang Sendiri"	Best Music Video	Won	
2017	"Manusia Kuat"	Best Music Video	Won	

== Mom & Kids Awards ==
The Mom & Kids Awards were established in 2015 by MNCTV to honour for talent artist in music and entertainment, as inspiration for mother and kids.

Year	Nominee / work	Award	Result	Ref.
2015	Tulus	Favorite Male Singer	Nominated	
2016	Tulus	Favorite Idol Singer	Nominated	

== Nickelodeon Indonesia Kids Choice Awards ==
The Nickelodeon Indonesia Kids' Choice Awards is the Indonesian version of Nickelodeon Kids' Choice Awards, held since 2008 in Jakarta. Tulus has received one award from 3 nominations.

Year	Nominee / work	Award	Result	Ref.
2015	Tulus	Favorite Singer	Nominated	
2016	"Pamit"	Favorite Indonesian Song	Nominated	
2017	Tulus	Favorite Singer	Won	

== Oz Radio Bandung FM Awards ==
The Oz Radio Bandung FM Awards are an online radio awards were presented by OZ Radio FM, for talent musician/singer who have listed of 'friendly' in music. Tulus has received two awards from 8 nominations.

Year	Nominee / work	Award	Result	Ref.
2017	"Pamit"	Most Friendly Song	Won	
2017	Tulus	Most Friendly Ozclusive	Won	
2017	Tulus	Most Friendly Male Singer	Nominated	
2017	Tulus	Most Friendly Musician	Nominated	
2018	Tulus	Most Friendly Musician	Pending	
2018	Tulus	Most Friendly Male Singer	Pending	
2018	"Tukar Jiwa"	Most Friendly Song	Pending	
2018	Teman Tulus	Most Friendly Fanbase	Pending	

== Rolling Stone Editor's Choice Awards ==
The Rolling Stone Editor's Choice Awards were created by Rolling Stone Indonesia magazine for outstanding contribution to the popularity of works, accomplishments, achievements, influence and popularity in popular culture. Tulus has received one award.

Year	Nominee / work	Award	Result	Ref.
2013	Tulus	Rookie of the Year	Won	

== SCTV Awards ==
The SCTV Awards are an award ceremony were presenting to artists who had most famous (Indonesian: Paling Ngetop) in entertainment by the Indonesian television station SCTV since 2001.

Year	Nominee / work	Award	Result	Ref.
2015	Tulus	Famous Singer	Nominated	

== SCTV Music Awards ==
The SCTV Music Awards is an annual awards for Indonesian musician and held by Indonesian television station, SCTV, since 2003 and also presenting some awards, who the winner selected based on voting public through SMS.

Year	Nominee / work	Award	Result	Ref.
2015	Tulus	Most Famous Male Solo Singer	Nominated	
2016	Tulus	Most Famous Male Solo Singer	Nominated	
2017	Tulus	Most Famous Male Solo Singer	Nominated	

== Selebrita Awards ==
The Selebrita Awards are an awards ceremony were presented by infotainment Selebrita since 2013, to awarded for celebrity in entertainment. It's based on voted by fans in Trans 7 website poll.

Year	Nominee / work	Award	Result	Ref.
2015	"Gajah"	Most Celeb Song	Nominated	
2016	"Pamit"	Most Celeb Song	Nominated	

== Honor awards, magazines, newspapers ==
=== Hai Magazine ===
Year	Nominee / work	Award	Result	Ref.
2015	Tulus	Artist of the Year	Won	

=== Java Jazz Festival ===
Year	Nominee / work	Award	Result	Ref.
2015	Tulus	Most Young Talented	Won	

=== JOOX Indonesia ===
JOOX is a music streaming platform that offers features such as radio stations, curated charts, editor’s picks, new releases, and offline listening. Tulus has received one award.

Year	Nominee/work	Award	Result	Ref
2017	Tulus	The Most Streamed Artist in 2017	Won	

=== Spotify Indonesia ===
Year	Nominee / work	Award	Result	Ref.
2016	Tulus	Top Male Artist 2016 (Indonesia)	Won	

=== Tempo Magazine ===
Year	Nominee / work	Award	Result	Ref.
2014	Gajah	Top 9 Indonesian Music Album	Won	
