= Yura Yunita =

Indonesian singer and songwriter (born 1987)

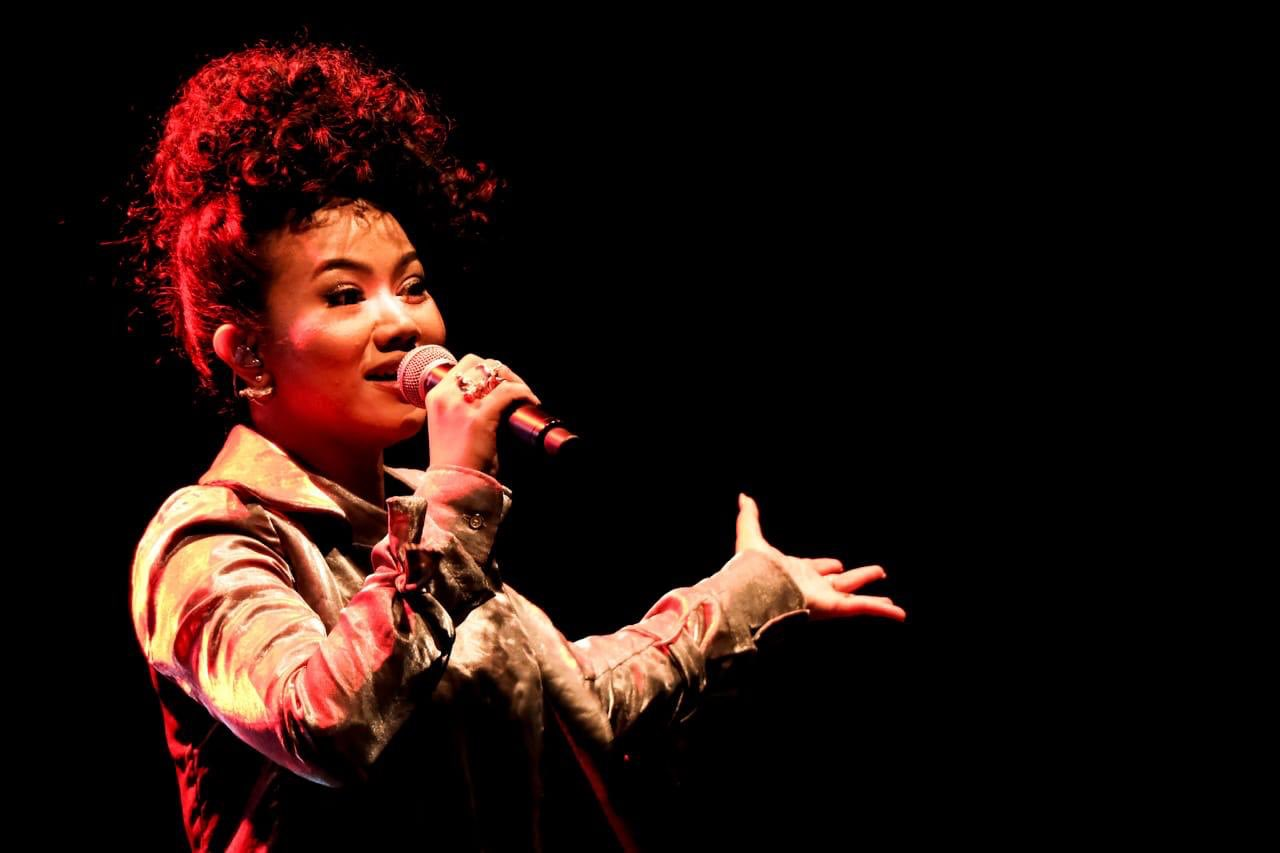
- Yunita in 2020
- Born: Yunita Rachman; 9 June 1987 (age 39); Bandung, West Java, Indonesia
- Spouse: Donne Maula (m. 2020)
- Musical career
- Genres: Blues; Jazz; Pop; Soul
- Occupations: Singer; Songwriter
- Instruments: Vocal; Piano; Guitar; Keyboard
- Label: Ayura

Yunita Rachman or better known as Yura Yunita (born in Bandung, West Java on 9 June 1987) is an Indonesian singer and songwriter of Sundanese descent.

Having succeeded with the hit "Cinta Dan Rahasia", she then released a third single entitled "Berawal Dari Tatap", which was released in conjunction with her music video. The single release, "Berawal Dari Tatap", was on top charts in major cities in Indonesia. This song was written by her.

In the beginning of 2015, she became a line-up artist at the 2015 Jakarta International Java Jazz Festival. In 2015, she also got three nominations in the 2015 Indonesia Choice Awards for category "Female Singer of the Year", "Breakthrough Artist of the Year", and "Song of the Year" (for the song "Cinta Dan Rahasia").

On 21 September 2018, Yura Yunita released her second album, Merakit. Six days later, she won her third Anugerah Musik Indonesia (AMI) Award for the Best Pop Female Solo Artist category, with the single Harus Bahagia.

Yura Yunita obtained her Bachelor's degree from Faculty of Communication, Padjadjaran University.

== Discography ==
=== Studio album ===
- Yura (2014)
- Merakit (2018)
- Tutur Batin (2021)

=== Singles ===
==== As lead artist ====
| Year | Title | Producer | Album | Label |
|---|---|---|---|---|
| 2014 | Balada Sirkus | Ari Renaldi | Yura | Musik Bagus Indonesia |
| 2014 | Cinta Dan Rahasia (feat. Glenn Fredly) | Ari Renaldi, Glenn Fredly | Yura | Musik Bagus Indonesia |
| 2015 | Berawal Dari Tatap | Ari Renaldi | Yura | Musik Bagus Indonesia |
| 2016 | Kasih Jangan Kau Pergi | Ifa Fachir | OST – I Am Hope | Musik Bagus Indonesia |
| 2016 | Intuisi | Yura | Merakit | Musik Bagus Indonesia |
| 2017 | Buktikan | Yura | (Single) | RPM |
| 2018 | Harus Bahagia | Ari Renaldi | Merakit | Ayura |
| 2018 | Pekat (feat. Reza Rahadian) | Yura, Reza Rahadian | (Single) | Ayura |
| 2018 | Takkan Apa | Ari Renaldi | Merakit | Ayura |
| 2018 | Buka Hati | Ari Renaldi | Merakit | Ayura |

==== As a featured artist ====
| Year | Title | Lead artist | Album |
|---|---|---|---|
| 2015 | Make You Feel Alright | Ginda Bestari | Soulful Desire |
| 2016 | Berani Sadari | Afgan | Sides |
| 2016 | Melawan Dunia | RAN | RAN |

== Videography ==
=== Music videos ===
| Year | Title | Director | Notes |
|---|---|---|---|
| 2014 | Balada Sirkus | Audy Erel | |
| 2015 | Berawal Dari Tatap | Marisca Surahman | Shot in Bandung |
| 2016 | Kataji | Desal Sembada | |
| 2016 | Get Along With You | Marisca Surahman | |
| 2016 | Cinta Dan Rahasia | Glenn Fredly | Feat. Glenn Fredly |
| 2016 | Intuisi | Jordan Marzuki | Shot in Kanazawa, Japan |
| 2017 | Melawan Dunia | Tessy Penyami | As a featured artist of RAN |
| 2017 | Buktikan | Jordan Marzuki | |
| 2018 | Harus Bahagia | Shadtoto Prasetio | |
| 2018 | Pekat | Samuel Erha | Feat. Reza Rahadian |
| 2018 | Takkan Apa | Didi Mulyadi Witono | |
| 2018 | Buka Hati | Galih Mulya Nugraha | Creative direction by Tulus |

== Awards and nominations ==
| Year | Award | Category | Recipients / Title | Results |
|---|---|---|---|---|
| 2014 | Hai Reader's Poll Music Awards | Best Female Artist | Yura Yunita | Nominated |
| 2015 | Indonesian Choice Awards | Breakthrough Artist of the Year | Yura Yunita | Nominated |
| 2015 | Indonesian Choice Awards | Female Singer of the Year | Yura Yunita | Nominated |
| 2015 | Indonesian Choice Awards | Song of the Year | Cinta Dan Rahasia (feat. Glenn Fredly) | Nominated |
| 2015 | Anugerah Musik Indonesia | Best Soul/R&B Album | Yura | Nominated |
| 2015 | Anugerah Planet Muzik | Best New Artist (Female) | Berawal Dari Tatap | Nominated |
| 2015 | Hai Reader's Poll Music Awards | The Best Female | Yura Yunita | Nominated |
| 2016 | Dahsyatnya Awards | Outstanding Newcomer | Yura Yunita | Nominated |
| 2016 | Dahsyatnya Awards | Outstanding Duet/Collaboration | Yura Yunita (feat. Glenn Fredly) | Nominated |
| 2016 | SCTV Music Awards | Most Famous Newcomer | Yura Yunita | Nominated |
| 2016 | Indonesian Choice Awards | Female Singer of the Year | Yura Yunita | Nominated |
| 2017 | Dahsyatnya Awards | Outstanding Music Video | Intuisi | Nominated |
| 2017 | Dahsyatnya Awards | Outstanding Model of a Music Video (with Reza Rahadian) | Intuisi | Nominated |
| 2017 | OZ Radio Bandung FM Awards | Most Friendly Song | Intuisi | Nominated |
| 2017 | OZ Radio Bandung FM Awards | Most Friendly Fanbase | Hip Hip Yura | Nominated |
| 2017 | OZ Radio Bandung FM Awards | Most Friendly Musician | Yura Yunita | Won |
| 2017 | OZ Radio Bandung FM Awards | Most Friendly Female Singer | Yura Yunita | Nominated |
| 2017 | SCTV Music Awards | Most Famous Female Solo Singer | Yura Yunita | Nominated |
| 2017 | JawaPos.com Reader's Choice Awards | Favourite Female Singer | Yura Yunita | Nominated |
| 2017 | Indonesian Choice Awards | Female Singer of the Year | Yura Yunita | Nominated |
| 2017 | Anugerah Musik Indonesia | Best Pop Female Solo Artist | Intuisi | Won |
| 2017 | Anugerah Musik Indonesia | Best Pop Songwriter | Intuisi | Won |
| 2018 | Dahsyatnya Awards | Outstanding Duet/Collaboration | Melawan Dunia (feat. RAN) | Nominated |
| 2018 | Dahsyatnya Awards | Outstanding Female Solo Singer | Yura Yunita | Nominated |
| 2018 | OZ Radio Bandung FM Awards | Most Friendly Female Singer | Yura Yunita | Pending |
| 2018 | OZ Radio Bandung FM Awards | Most Friendly Fanbase | Hip Hip Yura | Pending |
| 2018 | Anugerah Musik Indonesia | Best Pop Female Solo Artist | Harus Bahagia | Won |
