= Java Soundsfair =

Music festival in Jakarta

- Genre: Pop; R&B; Rock
- Dates: 24-26 October 2014
- Location: Jakarta Convention Center
- Years active: 2014
- Founders: Java Festival Production
- Website: www.javasoundsfair.com

Java Soundsfair was a music festival based in Jakarta, Indonesia. The only edition was held for three days, 24–26 October 2014 and it was held at Jakarta Convention Center. The event was promoted by Java Festival Production.

== Line-ups ==
All information taken from the website. Headline performers are listed in Boldface.

=== 2014 ===
Friday, 24 October

Main Hall	Cendrawasih 1 & 2	Cendrawasih 3	Assembly 1	Assembly 2
**MAGIC!**; RAN; Sophie Ellis-Bextor	Universounds Rise & Star; Tokyo Ska Paradise Orchestra; Asian Dub Foundation	CTS; Kraak & Smaak (DJ set); Darkbark Live; Jakarta Techno Militia	Elephant Kind; MY SKIN AGAINST YOUR SKIN; Neonomora	Bona Pascal; Stars & Rabbit
Assembly 3	Lobby	Merak	Kasuari	
Rock n Roll Mafia; SORE; Bottlesmoker; Barasuara	KELEVRA; Suddenly September; KarnaTra	Puti Chitara; Superglad; Morfem; Matajiwa	LCDTRIP; Lightcraft; Rebel Education Project	

Saturday, 25 October

Main Hall	Cendrawasih 1 & 2	Cendrawasih 3	Assembly 1	Assembly 2
**Cody Simpson**; Ipang; Tulus	Maliq & D'Essentials; Yamaha Music Sings Coldplay feat. Sandhy Sondoro, Kikan Namara, Bams, Is Payung Teduh & Sashi G; Poolside	.GiF; Ductape; Basement House; Kraak & Smaak (DJ set)	Lie Gramophone; NICK; Cibo Matto	L'Alphalpha; Teman Sebangku; The Milo
Assembly 3	Lobby	Merak	Kasuari	
Monkey To Millionaire; BRNDLS; Homogenic; Angsa & Serigala	Diana Tumewa; Los Daniels; Weish; Gilbert Pohan	Pandai Besi; Marsh Kids; Sentimental Moods; Pure Saturday; White Shoes & The Couples Company	Bandung Inikami Orcheska; Dhyo Haw; Leonardo and His Impeccable Six; The Alastair x DJ Cream	

Sunday, 26 October

Main Hall	Cendrawasih 1 & 2	Cendrawasih 3	Assembly 1	Assembly 2
**The Jacksons**; Ari Lasso; Yuna	Mocca; Roosevelt; Kraak & Smaak (DJ set)	About Wax; House Cartel; Javabass Soundsystem; Makoto	Kelompok Penerbang Roket; G-Pluck; Young de Brock	Story Starry Nite; Dekat; Dhirabongs
Assembly 3	Lobby	Merak	Kasuari	
Poolside; Art of Tree; The S.I.G.I.T	Cashew Chemist; Merah; RED	Adhitia Sofyan; Bonita And The Husband; Endah N Rhesa; Float	Neurotic; Teza Sumendra; Matthew Sayersz; Kunto Aji	
