= Bob Tutupoly =

Indonesian singer (1939–2022)

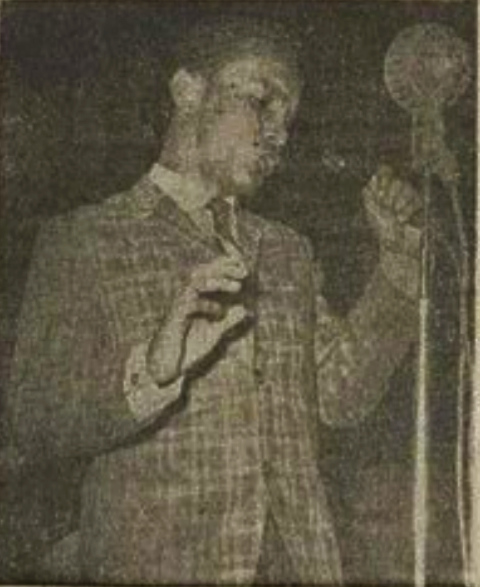
- Tutupoly in 1967

Background information
- Born: Bobby Willem Tutupoly; 13 November 1939; Surabaya, East Java, Dutch East Indies
- Died: 5 July 2022 (aged 82) Jakarta, Indonesia
- Occupations: Singer, host, actor
- Labels: Blackboard, Arco Studio, Golden Hand, Aroma Records, Tropidana Records, Tanama Record dan Gita Virma Record
- Spouse: Rosmayasuti Nasution (1977–2022)

Bobby Willem Tutupoly (13 November 1939 – 5 July 2022), better known as Bob Tutupoly, was an Indonesian singer, host, and actor. He started his recording career in Jakarta in 1965 with Pattie Bersaudara. He was known for his songs such as "Lidah Tak Bertulang", "Tiada Maaf Bagimu", "Tinggi Gunung Seribu Janji", and "Widuri". He is widely regarded as one of the most iconic Indonesian singers ever.

== Early life ==
Bob Tutupoly was the second child of five siblings, born to Adolf Laurens Tutupoly and Elisabeth Wilhemmina Henket-Sahusilawane, who were migrants from Negeri Ouw, Maluku. He was born at William Booth Hospital, Diponegoro Street, Surabaya on 13 November 1939. Bob had an older brother named Christian Jacobus Tutupoly and three younger siblings named Alexander Bartjes Tutupoly, Hendrika Laurensia Tutupoly, and Adolf Tutupoly Jr. (who died in 1947 during the struggle for independence in Yogyakarta).

== Career ==
=== Singing career ===
Bob Tutupoly showed his talent for singing since he was young. He sang at hotels and joined several bands and vocal groups, such as Kwartet Jazz (Jazz Quartet) on Radio Republik Indonesia (RRI) in Surabaya. He then recorded popular songs like "Tiada Maaf Bagimu" and "Tinggi Gunung Seribu Janji" with the famous Pattie Sisters. After performing in neighboring countries like Malaysia and Singapore, Bob moved to the United States in 1969 at the invitation of the Los Angeles-based Indonesian group Venturas to record some music. But nothing materialized, and Bob eventually became a singer at nightclubs in Las Vegas.

In 1976, he returned to Indonesia and recorded the now-classic song "Widuri", written by Slamet Adriyadi. The song became very popular and is considered one of his signature songs.

=== Hosting career ===
Bob Tutupoly also built his career as an iconic host of quiz shows on TVRI, such as Pesona 13 and Ragam Pesona. He was known for his charismatic and humorous personality.

== Acting career ==
Bob Tutupoly also tried his hand at acting. He appeared in several Indonesian films, such as Gli Innamorati Della Becak (1958), Penasaran (1977), and Sebelah Mata (2008). In Penasaran, he played a singer who was involved in a love triangle with two women. In Sebelah Mata, he played a retired singer who was reunited with his old bandmates.

== Discography ==
=== Albums ===
- Hush-Not A Word To Mary (1968) with The Pro's
- Salah Duga (1970) with The Comets
- Bob Tutupoly Vol. 3 (1975)
- Bob Tutupoly Vol. 2 (1976) with De Meicy
- Bob Tutupoly Vol 1 (1977) with Panca Nada
- Penantian Tak Bertepi (1982) with Purnama Sultan
- Yang Mempesona (1988)
- Satukanlah (1999) with Yuni Shara
- The Best Of Bob Tutupoly (unknown year)
- Antara Bulan Dan Bintang (unknown year)
- Broery Pesolima Bersama D'Lloyd (unknown year) with Broery Pesolima and D'Lloyd

=== Singles ===
- "Tiada Maaf Bagimu" / "Tinggi Gunung Seribu Janji" (1965) with Pattie Bersaudara
- "Lidah Tak Bertulang" / "Kau Yang Kusayang" (1966)
- "Widuri" / "Kerinduan" (1976)
- "Kau Yang Terindah" / "Kisah Cinta" (1977)
- Symphoni Yang Indah (1980)
- "Aku Tak Percaya" / "Kau Yang Terindah" (1988)
- "Widuri 2000" / "Widuri 2000 Remix" (2000)

=== Guest appearances ===
- This Conversation and Swing it Bob (2004) on Mocca's second album Friends

== Family ==
Bob Tutupoly married Rosmayasuti Nasution, a dancer and Miss Jakarta 1972, in 1977. They had one daughter, Sasha Karina Tutupoly.

== Death ==
Bob Tutupoly died of complications from a stroke on 5 July 2022 at Mayapada Hospital in South Jakarta. He was 82 years old. He had suffered a stroke and had been receiving treatment at his home before being hospitalized.

== Filmography ==
=== Films ===
Year	Title	Role	Notes
1958	Gli Innamorati Della Becak		
1977	Penasaran	A singer	
2008	Sebelah Mata	A retired singer	

== Awards and nominations ==
Year	Award	Category	Result	Ref.
2015	Anugerah Musik Indonesia	Legend Award	Won	
