= Tulus (album) =

Album by Tulus

Studio album by Tulus
- Released: September 2011
- Recorded: Aru Studio, Bandung, Escape Studio, Bandung, Taman Lansia, Bandung (Merdu Untukmu (Outro))
- Genres: Jazz; Pop
- Length: 29:20
- Labels: Demajors; Trinity Optima Production
- Producer: Ari Renaldi

Tulus chronology
Tulus (2011)	Gajah (2014)

Tulus is the debut studio album by Indonesian recording artist Tulus. The album was produced by Ari Renaldi and released by Tulus Record in September 2011. It also launched by Demajors. The album contains 10 songs, including "Merdu Untukmu", "Diorama", and "Sewindu".

Tulus wrote most of the songs, like "Sewindu", "Teman Hidup", "Kisah Sebentar", "Tuan Nona kesepian" and "Jatuh Cinta" which dominated the charts on radio stations across Indonesia. The self-titled album was top the charts on January until February 2012, by Rolling Stone Indonesia.

== Track listing ==
No.	Title	Writer(s)	Length
1.	"Merdu Untukmu" (Intro)	Tulus; Anto Arief	1:03
2.	"Teman Pesta"	Tulus	2:46
3.	"Kisah Sebentar"	Tulus	2:55
4.	"Sewindu"	Tulus; Razis Henry	4:00
5.	"Diorama" (Studio Live)	Tulus; Ivan Jonathan	2:49
6.	"Tuan Nona Kesepian"	Tulus	3:20
7.	"Jatuh Cinta"	Tulus	3:55
8.	"Teman Hidup"	Tulus	3:42
9.	"Sewindu" (Rhodes version)	Tulus; Razis Henry	3:49
10.	"Merdu Untukmu" (Outro)	Tulus; Anto Arief	1:02
Total length:			29:20

== Personnel ==
- Tulus – lead vocals, lyrics, backing vocal
- Anto Arief – guitar, lyrics (track no 2, 6)
- Razis Henry – lyrics
- Ari Renaldi – producer, drum, keys
- Rudy Zulkarnaen – upright bass (track no 2, 3, 7, 8)
- Grace Sahertian, Marshella Safira, Lukman Hakim – backing vocals (track no 2, 3)
- Topan Abimanyu – guitar (track no 3, 4, 7, 8)
- Brury Effendi – trumpet, flugerhorn (track no 3, 7)
- Imam Praseno – piano (track no 3)
- dr. Gega Nesywara – electric bass (track no 4)
- Sindhu Bayusekti – bass (track no 5, 6)
- Ivan Jonathan – piano, rhodes (track no 5, 10)
- Marshella Safira, Lukman Hakim – backing vocal (track no 6)
- Grace Sahertian – backing vocal (track no 7)

== Popular culture ==
The cover of the album was used as the butt of jokes for meme-makers.
