= Dewi Sandra =

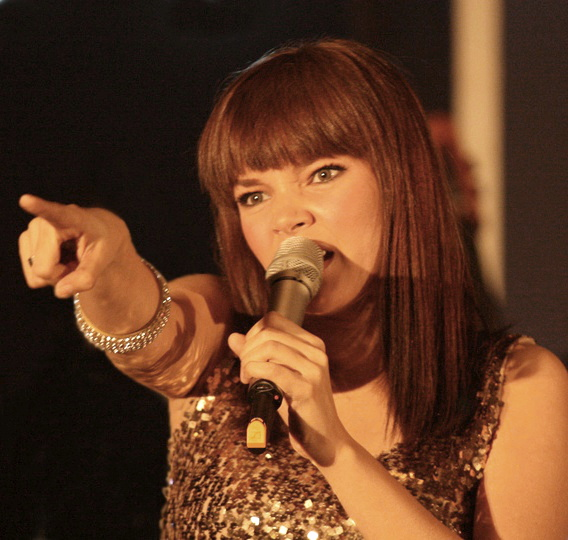
- Dewi Sandra in 2010

Background information
- Also known as: Dewi Sandra
- Born: Dewi Sandra Killick; 3 April 1980 (age 45); Rio de Janeiro, Brazil
- Genres: Pop; R&B; Jazz; Dance-Pop
- Occupations: Singer model
- Years active: 1995–present

Dewi Sandra Killick (born 3 April 1980) is a Brazilian-born Indonesian singer and model of mixed English and Betawi descent.

== Biography ==
Sandra was born in Brazil on 3 April 1980. She is of mixed heritage; her mother, Hajjah Prihartini, was Betawi and her father, John George Killick, was a British national. As a child, she was overweight, which led her to receive the nickname "Miss Piggy". However, she lost weight and began modelling in her teens, later recording the compilation album Menari-Nari (Dance) with her fellow models.

She released her first solo album, Kurasakan (I Feel), in 1998 to lukewarm reception. Critics objected that she was only "selling a pretty face". She then received further vocal training, after which she released Tak Ingin Lagi (Don't Want It Anymore), which was received better.

Her next album, Kuakui (I Admit), was released in 2004 after three years production. The following album, 2007's Star, was more experimental. It mixed uptempo beats on some tracks with slow ballads.

The following year, Sandra became the host of the fifth season of Indonesian Idol. She also turned to acting, starring in several teen films.

Sandra released her fifth album, Wanita (Woman), not long after her divorce in 2009. A single from the album, "Kapan Lagi Bilang I Love You" ("When Will You Say I Love You Again"), was released in April, with the album following in October. One of the songs, "Satu Untuk Selamanya", discussed how happy she had been with Glenn Fredly at the beginning of their relationship.

In 2011 she was cast in her first sinetron (Indonesian soap opera), Nada Cinta (Tones of Love), as a singing teacher. She expressed surprise at the rushed nature of the filming.

== Style ==
Her first four albums were categorized with "bouncy R&B songs infused with a joyful mood". However, her fifth album, Wanita, featured more melancholic melodies.

== Personal life ==
She married actor Surya Saputra in the early 2000s; they divorced in 2005. She then married singer Glenn Fredly. He proposed to her at the National Monument and they were married in Bali on her 26th birthday. But that interfaith marriage did not last long. Fredly initiated divorce proceedings in April 2009. On 11 December 2011, Dewi Sandra is married for third time, to Agus Rahman.

She enjoys reading, becoming addicted to it after being introduced to the Harry Potter series as a teenager. She also enjoys watching movies and travelling.

Sandra admires Madonna, Oprah Winfrey, and Nelson Mandela; Madonna and Oprah for being strong, emancipated women, and Mandela for being a dedicated leader.

== Awards and nominations ==
Year	Award	Category	Recipients	Result
2001	Anugerah Musik Indonesia	AMI Award for Best R&B Album	Dewi Sandra	Won
2004	For Him Magazine	Sexiest Female Indonesian Artist	Dewi Sandra	—N/a
2013	Indonesian Film Festival	Citra Award for Best Leading Actress	Air Mata Surga	Nominated

== Discography ==
- Hangatnya Cinta (1995)
- Kurasakan (I Feel; 1998)
- Tak Ingin Lagi (Don't Want It Anymore; 2000)
- Kuakui (I Admit; 2004)
- Star (2007)
- Wanita (Woman; 2009)
