= Mocca (band) =

Indonesian band

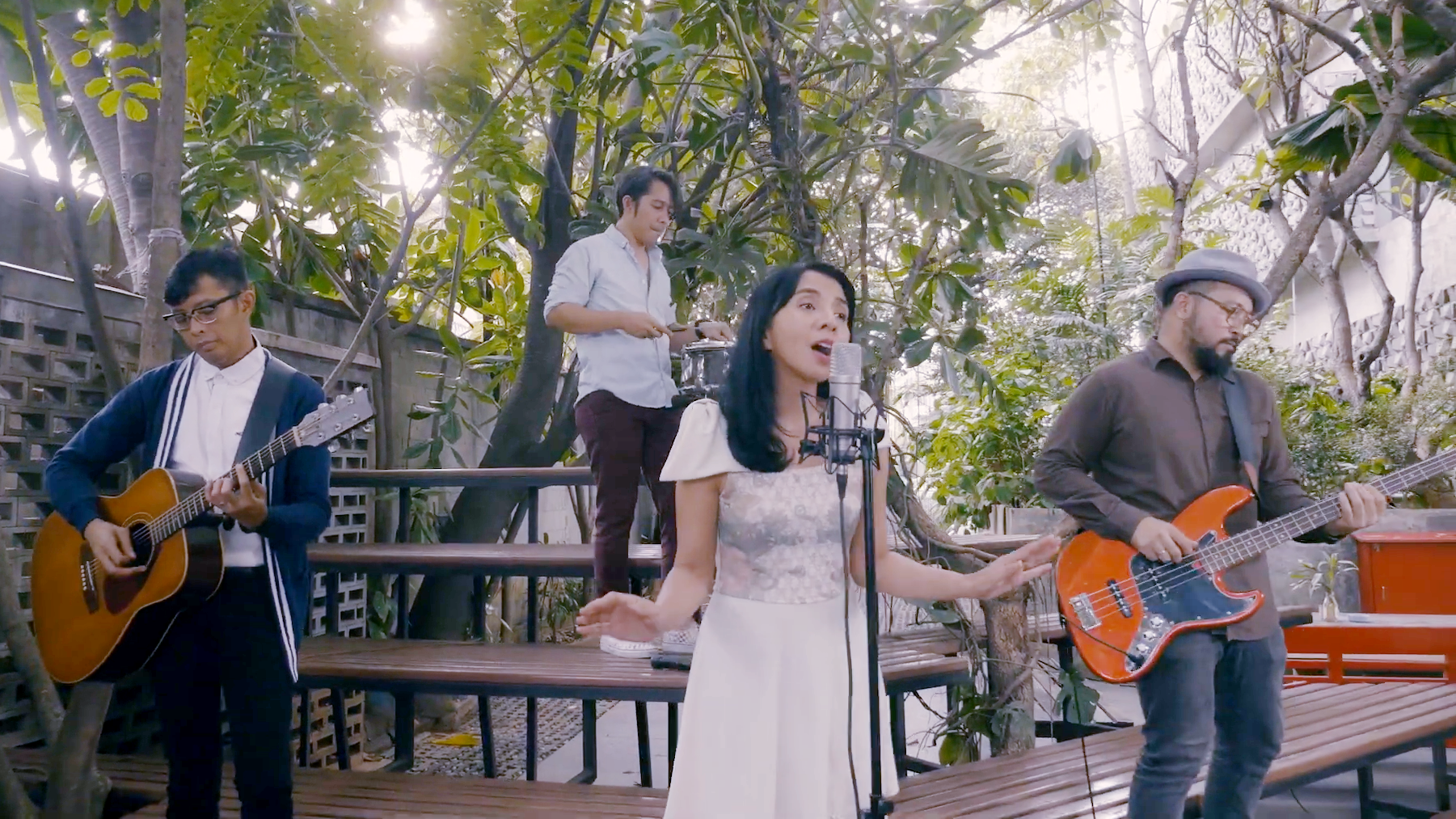
- Mocca performing in December 2019

Background information
- Origin: Bandung, Indonesia
- Genres: Indie pop, swing, jazz
- Years active: 1997 – present
- Label: FFWD, Lucky Me Music
- Members: Arina Ephipania Simangunsong; Riko Prayitno; Achmad ("Toma") Pratama; Indra Massad
- Website: www.moccaofficial.com

Mocca is an Indonesian four-member jazz and swing band based in Jakarta.

== The band ==
Mocca was formed in 1997 by Arina Ephipania (vocals, flute) and Riko Prayitno (guitar), who met while studying at the National Institute of Technology. In a 2004 interview with The Straits Times Ephipania said "Riko was influenced by rock music, I was fascinated by motion picture music and story telling, so we came up with this concept of telling stories in a musical form." The other two principal members are Achmad Pratama (a.k.a. Toma) (bass) and Indra Massad (drums). They signed with independent label Fast Forward Records in 2002. The band is popular in Singapore, Malaysia, Thailand, Japan, Korea and Taiwan. Mocca's fans are called Swinging Friends.

Mocca includes the following other members when playing live:

- Ardiansyah — trombone (2002–present)
- Agung Nugraha — keyboards (2002–present)
- Indra Kusumah — keyboards and guitar, occasional (2015–present)
- Yonathan Godjali — keyboards (2020–present)
- Rio Fritz Torang - keyboards (2021–present)
- Dodo Rahmadi - trumpet (2021–present)
- Akbari "Bane" Hakim — trumpet (2020)
- Ronald Tommy Pangemanan — trumpet (2002-2019)

== Discography ==
- My Diary (2002) Indonesia's best selling Indie album of the 2000s. Rolling Stone Indonesia magazine placed My Diary at 59th on their list The 150 Greatest Indonesian Albums of All Time. Me and My Boyfriend, the fifth track on the album, was ranked 150th Greatest Indonesian Songs of All Time. It sold an estimated 150,000 copies in Indonesia.
- Friends (2004) featuring guest artists Bob Tutupoly and Karoline Komstedt from Club 8. It was re-released in 2015.
- OST Untuk Rena (2005)
- Colours (2007)
- Mini Album (also known as Dear Friends or Mocca) (2010)
- Home (2014)
- Lima (2018) the band's first Indonesian language album
- Day by Day (2020) released as a limited edition (500) box set to mark the band's 21st anniversary
- Funfair EP (2021) featuring guest artist David Bayu

In 2019, to celebrate Mocca’s 20th anniversary, a tribute album You and Me Against the World was released, featuring nine new musicians and bands.

== Film and TV ==
The band appeared regularly on MTV Indonesia in the 2000s.

- 2005 - Hanya Satu appeared on the OST of Untuk Rena, directed by Riri Riza
- 2005 - On the Night like This and I Remember appeared on the OST of Catatan Akhir Sekolah
- 2008 - Listen to Me appeared on the OST of Oh, My God!!
- 2009 - Do What You Wanna Do appeared on the OST of South Korean film Bandhobi, directed by Shin Dong-il
- 2011 - Happy from their 2005 album featured on the OST of South Korean film Cool Guys, Hot Ramen (aka Flower Boy Ramen Shop), directed by Jung Jung-hwa.
- 2011 - directors Ari Rusyadi and Nicholas Yudifar released a documentary Mocca: Life Keeps on Turning about the band's first 12 years together, before Arina moved to America. It was nominated for the 2011 Golden Hanoman Award
- 2019 - Happy appeared on the OST of Inseparable Bros
- 2019 - Friends appeared on the OST of Senior
- 2021 - Simple I Love You appeared on the OST of Cinta Pertama, Kedua & Ketiga

Their music has appeared on TV adverts in South Korea, Thailand and Indonesia and on South Korean TV shows including We Got Married and Personal Taste.

== International appearances ==
- Indonesian Art Festival, Victoria Theater Hall, Singapore (2003)
- Poptastic!, Singapore (2004)
- Esplanade, Singapore (2005)
- Pattaya Festival Thailand, Bangkok (2005)
- My Diary: The Two Cities Tour, Singapore and Kuala Lumpur (2006)
- Sound Rainbow: Livin With People of Asia, Okinawa, Japan (2006)
- Perayaan HUT RI ke-63 di KBRI Malaysia, Wisma Duta, Kuala Lumpur (2008)
- Mocca: Inthebox Records Live in Malaysia, Kuala Lumpur (2008)
- Grand Mint Festival, Olympic Park, Seoul, South Korea (2008)
- M.Net Street Take 1 and The EBS space (TV shows), Seoul, South Korea (2008)
- Mosaic Music Festival, Singapore (2009)
- Swing Again with Mocca, Shah Alam, Malaysia (2009)
- Asia Uncut, Star World, Singapore (2009)
- Hua Hin Jazz Festival, Hua Hin City, Thailand (2009) where they played for King Bhumibol the Great
- Mocca’s Concert, Seoul, South Korea (2009)
- MOCCA 10th Anniversary Tour, Singapore and Malaysia, (2009)
- Pentaport Rock Festival, Incheon, South Korea (2012)
- MU:CON (Seoul International Music Fair), South Korea (2013)
- Neonlights Festival, Fort Canning Gate, Singapore (2015)
- Asia Song Festival, South Korea (2017)
- OzAsia Festival, Adelaide, Australia (2017)

== Awards ==
| Year | Nominee / work | Award | Result |
|---|---|---|---|
| 2003 | Most Favourite New Artist | MTV Indonesia | Nominated |
| 2003 | Best Music Video Award Me and My Boyfriend | MTV Indonesia | Won |
| 2003 | Best Newcomer | Anugerah Musik Indonesia (AMI) | Nominated |
| 2004 | Most Favourite Indonesian Artist | MTV Asia | Nominated |
| 2005 | Editor's Choice | Rolling Stone | Won |
| 2008 | Best Alternative Production | Anugerah Musik Indonesia (AMI) | Won |
| 2008 | Best Graphic Design | Anugerah Musik Indonesia (AMI) | Nominated |
