= Gajah =

Studio album by Tulus
- Released: February 19, 2014
- Recorded: 2013–2014 (Studio ARU, Bandung)
- Genres: Jazz, Pop
- Length: 29:20
- Label: TulusCo
- Producer: Ari Renaldi

Tulus chronology
Tulus (2011)	Gajah (2014)	Monokrom (2016)

Singles from Gajah
- 1. "Sepatu" Released: August 22, 2013; 2. "Baru" Released: January 22, 2014

Gajah (Elephant) is the second studio album by Indonesian singer-songwriter Tulus. The album was released on February 19, 2014, by Demajors. The album occupied the eighth position in iTunes Indonesia in July. A few months after release, the single "Gajah" entered the charts in Indonesia. "Sepatu" had re-released single for Japanese' version "Kutsu" (セパトゥ〜くつ〜) and lyrically had translated by Hiroaki Kato, a Japanese artist. Other singles from the album were "1000 Tahun Lamanya" and "Jangan Cintai Aku Apa Adanya".

The songs were written by Tulus, except "Baru", written by Tulus and Ferry Nurhayat. Gajah was listed to entering for Top 9 Indonesian Album by Indonesian Tempo magazine.

The album won two awards (Best of the Best Album and Best Pop Album) at the 2015 Anugerah Musik Indonesia. The album was nominated for "Album of the Year" at the 1st Indonesian Choice Awards, but lost to Raisa' Heart to Heart.

== Track listing ==
No.	Title	Writer(s)	Length
1.	"Baru"	Tulus; Ferry Nurhayat	2:58
2.	"Bumerang"	Tulus	3:58
3.	"Sepatu"	Tulus	3:39
4.	"Bunga Tidur"	Tulus	3:31
5.	"Tanggal Merah"	Tulus	2:22
6.	"Gajah"	Tulus	3:59
7.	"Lagu Untuk Matahari"	Tulus	3:41
8.	"Satu Hari di Bulan Juni"	Tulus	3:15
9.	"Jangan Cintai Aku Apa Adanya"	Tulus	3:49
Total length:			31:32

== Commercial responses ==
The single "Sepatu" as released on iTunes on August 22, 2013. The song received positive reviews and sold well on iTunes.

The album Gajah was launched on February 19, 2014, through iTunes and physical release on CD. The album received positive reviews, selling 5,000 copies in its first week and 60,000 copies in the first two months, the best selling album from Demajors since Endah N Rhesa, which sold 30,000 copies.

== Personnel ==
- Tulus – lead vocals, lyrics, co-producer
- Riri Muktamar – executive producer
- Ari Renaldi – producer, mixing, mastering, arranger, arasemen, drums, piano, percussion, and keyboard
- Rudy Zulkarnaen – arranger (track no 5), arasemen (track no 5), bass, contrabass
- Yonathan Godjali – daras music idea (track no 6)
- Topan Abimanyu – guitar (track no 2, 3, 4, 6, 7, 8, 9)
- Anto Arief – guitar (track no 1)
- Brury Effendi – trumpet, flugelhorn
- Matt Ashworth – saxophone
- Raga Dipa Eka Kirana – violin
- Laksmitada Dewi Nurul Qolbiah – violin
- Tommy Ilham Junaedi – violin
- Andan Adrian – cello
- Ammy Kurniawan – guitar (track no 8)
- Ferry Nurhayat – backing vocal (track no 1, 7, 8)
- Lia Amalia – backing vocal (track no 7, 8)

== Awards and nominations ==
Year	Awards	Category	Results
2014	Indonesian Choice Awards	Album of the Year	Nominated
2014	Tempo Magazine	Top 9 Indonesian Music Album	Won
2014	Hai Reader's Poll Music Awards	The Best Album	Won
2015	Anugerah Musik Indonesia	Best of the Best Album	Won
2015	Anugerah Musik Indonesia	Best Pop Album	Won
