= Tulus (singer) =

Indonesian singer (born 1987)

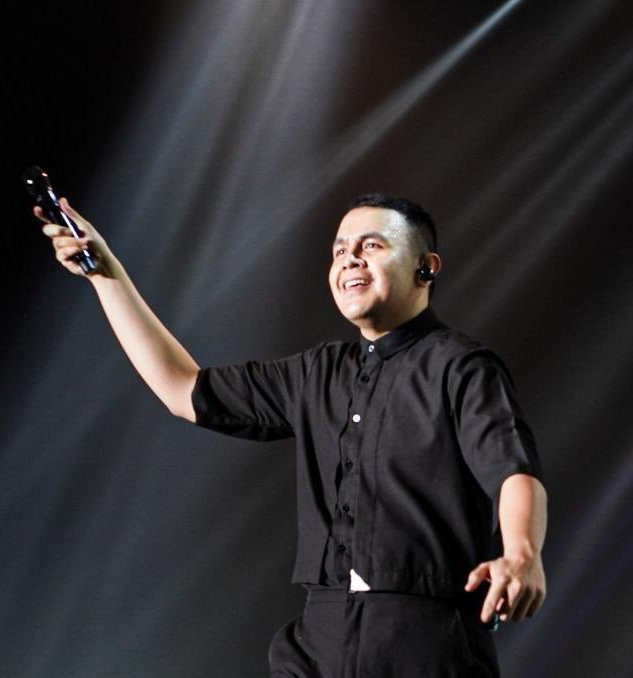
- Tulus performing in Jakarta, 2020
- Born: Muhammad Tulus; 20 August 1987 (age 38); Bukittinggi, West Sumatera, Indonesia
- Occupations: Singer, songwriter
- Years active: 2011–present
- Musical career
- Genres: Pop; Jazz; R&B; Swing
- Label: TulusCompany
- Website: situstulus.com

Muhammad Tulus (born 20 August 1987), better known by his mononym Tulus, is an Indonesian singer and songwriter of Minangkabau descent.

== Career ==
=== Albums ===
His debut album, Tulus, was released in 2011. Rolling Stone Indonesia put this album on the top chart of Indonesia's Best Album and awarded Tulus Rookie of the Year in 2013. His second album, Gajah, was released in 2013. Since then, 88,000 copies have been produced and distributed, making it one of the largest CD productions in Indonesia (2014–2015). It was the only music album in the Indonesian language that was listed in The Top 10 Best Selling Music Album in iTunes Asia, two months in a row after it was released. The title of the album was chosen because it was a childhood nickname of Tulus. "Gajah" is also the title of one of the songs on the album. It also includes the songs "Tanggal Merah", "Satu hari di Bulan Juni", "Bumerang", "Gajah", and others. "Sepatu" was re-released with a Japanese version, entitled "Kutsu" (セパトゥ〜くつ〜) which translated by Hiroaki Kato, on iTunes on 10 October 2015.

In 2016, his third studio album Monokrom was officially released on 3 August, by his own label Tulus Co. It was also released under CD to 100 Indonesian music stores and also released in digital in Malaysia.

=== Music videos ===
The six music videos for both of Tulus' albums were released on his YouTube channel. They are titled "Sewindu", "Baru", "Gajah", and "Jangan Cintai Aku Apa Adanya". Tulus directed the music videos for "Teman Hidup" and "Sepatu". The music video for "Sepatu" was shot in Hamburg, Germany and "Baru" was shot in Tokyo, Japan. In 2016, Tulus shot the music video for "Pamit" in Prague, Czech Republic.

=== Overseas performances ===
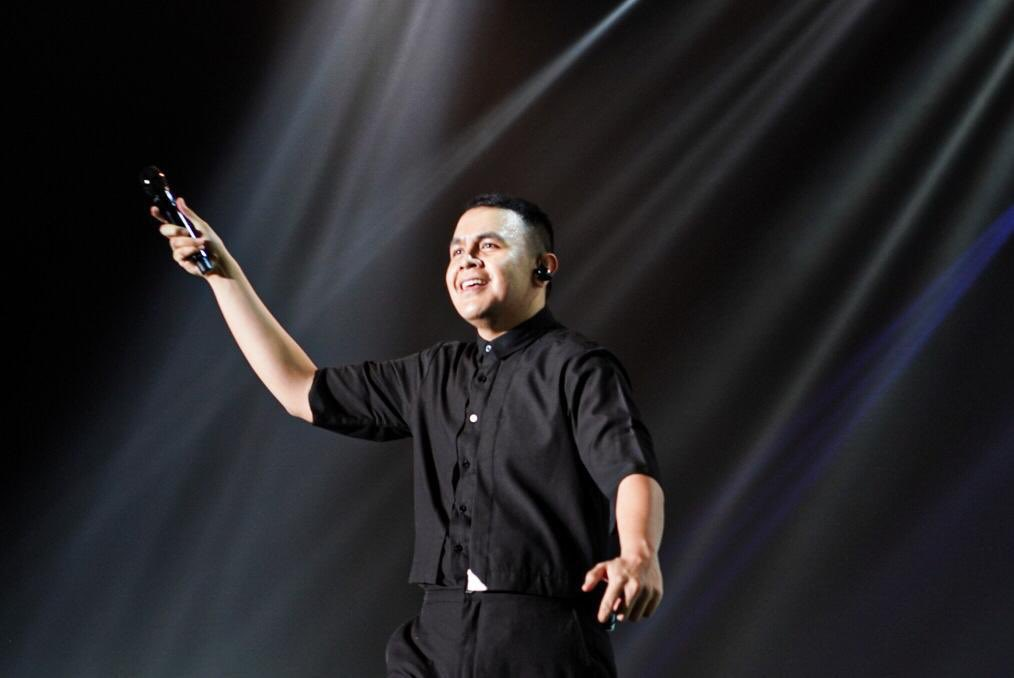
Tulus performs at Jakarta International Java Jazz Festival 2020.

Tulus has performed six solo concerts, titled Tulus: An Introduction (2011), Tulus: Beyond Sincere (2012), Tulus: Diorama Concert (2013), Tulus: Gajah Concert Bandung (2014), Tulus: Gajah Concert Jakarta (2014), Tulus: Gajah Concert Yogyakarta (2015). He has also performed at Java Jazz, Java Soundsfair, Bali Live Jazz Festival, Soulnation, and at Sounds of Indonesia in Hamburg, Germany.

In October 2014, Tulus performed at the Anugerah Planet Muzik award ceremony in Singapore that was broadcast live in Malaysia and Indonesia. Tulus also won the "Best New Male Artist" award.

In May 2015, Tulus represented Indonesia at the Asia Pacific Festival and International Music Conference of Music Matters 2015 in Singapore. He performed twice for the conference attendees during the festival. In September 2015, he was invited to perform at Soundsekerta 2015. This event was created by Indonesian students community in Melbourne, Australia. Tulus was invited to perform at the Hamazo 10th Festival in Hamamatsu, Japan in October 2015. That same month, he appeared at Macquarie University Auditorium, Sydney. This event was created by the local Indonesian student community.

=== The Voice Kids Indonesia ===
On 29 April 2016, Tulus joined the coaching panel of The Voice Kids Indonesia with Bebi Romeo and Agnez Mo.

=== Collaborations ===
In addition to his albums, Tulus has collaborated on projects for brand activation campaigns. In 2014 – 2015, Tulus acted as a brand ambassador for Bend The Rules International campaign, held by Hewlett-Packard. Tulus released a new theme song in support of this campaign.

Tulus composed a single, entitled "Lekas", which was used on the soundtrack for the Indonesian movie, 3 Nafas Likas (2014). In mid 2015, Tulus created a song with Ran, an Indonesian music group, for that will be used in an ad campaign for Listerine.

== Tulus Company ==
Tulus Company is an independent music label company was founded by Tulus together with his brother, Riri Muktamar, in 2010. Tulus Company has two main business divisions: Tulus Management (Tulus Man.) and Tulus Production (Tulus Pro.). Tulus has written songs released in two albums through Tulus Company, an independent record label company that he co founded with his older brother, Riri Muktamar.

== Discography ==
=== Studio albums ===
- Tulus (2011)
- Gajah (2014)
- Monokrom (2016)
- Manusia (2022)

=== Singles ===
==== As lead artist ====
List of singles, showing year released and selected chart positions
Title	Year	Peak chart positions		Certifications	Album
Title	Year	IND	WW	Certifications	Album
"Sewindu"	2011	–	–		Tulus
"Teman Hidup"	2011	–	–		Tulus
"Sepatu"	2013	–	–		Gajah
"Baru"	2014	–	–		Gajah
"Gajah"	2014	–	–		Gajah
"Jangan Cintai Aku Apa Adanya"	2015	–	–		Gajah
"Pamit"	2016	–	–		Monokrom
"Ruang Sendiri"	2016	36	–		Monokrom
"Monokrom"	2016	21	–		Monokrom
"Manusia Kuat"	2017	–	–		Monokrom
"Tukar Jiwa"	2017	–	–		Monokrom
"Langit Abu-Abu"	2018	–	–		Monokrom
"Labirin"	2018	–	–		Non-album singles
"Adu Rayu" (with Yovie Widianto & Glenn Fredly)	2019	4	–		Non-album singles
"Hati-Hati di Jalan"	2022	1	123		Manusia

== Television ==
Year	Title	Role
2016–2017	The Voice Kids Indonesia	Himself (coach)
