= Glenn Fredly =

Indonesian singer-songwriter (1975–2020)

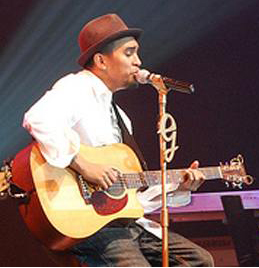
- Latuihamallo performing a tribute to Chrisye at the 2009 Java Jazz Festival

Background information
- Born: Glenn Fredly Deviano Latuihamallo; 30 September 1975; Jakarta, Indonesia
- Died: 8 April 2020 (aged 44) Jakarta, Indonesia
- Genres: Jazz; pop; R&B
- Occupations: Singer; songwriter; producer; actor
- Instruments: Vocals; guitar; bass guitar; piano
- Years active: 1995–2020
- Spouse(s): Dewi Sandra (m. 2006; div. 2009) Mutia Ayu Wandini (m. 2019)
- Website: glennfredly.com

Glenn Fredly Deviano Latuihamallo (30 September 1975 – 8 April 2020), better known as Glenn Fredly, was an Indonesian R&B singer and songwriter as well as producer and actor. Entering the music industry after winning a singing contest in 1995, he released more than 10 albums. He produced new talented artists like female vocalist Yura and male soloist Gilbert Pohan. He also produced Cahaya Dari Timur: Beta Maluku. In 2013, he served as a coach for The Voice Indonesia.

== Early life ==
Latuihamallo was born in Jakarta on 30 September 1975 to Hengky and Linda Latuihamallo. He was the first of five children. He was of Moluccan descent.

== Career ==
In 1995, he won the Cipta Pesona Bintang singing contest. That same year, he joined the rock band Funk Section. The following year, he was a finalist in the Asia Song Festival. In 1998, Latuihamallo left Funk Section to be a solo R&B singer, feeling that it suited his vocal style better. He released his first album, GLENN, that year. It was relatively well received, selling 50 thousand copies; R&B was generally not popular in Indonesia at the time.

In 2000, Latuihamallo released his second solo album, Kembali (Return), with the single "Kasih Putih" ("White Love") receiving much airplay. In 2001, he placed third in the Russian Asia Dauzy International Song Festival.

In August 2002, he released one of his most successful albums, titled Selamat Pagi, Dunia (Good Morning, World).

He married singer Dewi Sandra in Uluwatu, Bali on 3 April 2006. He filed for divorce in 2009.

In March 2009, Latuihamallo was one of the main performers in a tribute concert to deceased Indonesian singer Chrisye during the Java Jazz Festival. That same year, he performed tribute concerts to Michael Jackson in five cities throughout Indonesia, covering Jackson's hit songs.

In 2011, he joined Tompi and Sandhy Sondoro to perform a set of concerts under the name Trio Lestari (The Eternal Trio).

Latuihamallo celebrated his 17th anniversary in the music business with a sold-out concert in front of 7,500 people at Istora Gelora Bung Karno on 2 September 2012.

In 2014, he entered film producing with the film Cahaya Dari Timur: Beta Maluku, which received the best movie award from the Indonesian Film Festival.

== Death ==
Latuihamallo died on 8 April 2020 in Setia Mitra Hospital in South Jakarta at the age of 44. It was reported that his cause of death was meningitis. He was married to his wife, Mutia Ayu, for 7.5 months (they were married on 19 August 2019). Their daughter, Gewa, was born on 28 February 2020.

== Influences ==
Latuihamallo credited Michael Jackson as being one of his influences, saying that Jackson inspired him "through his music, his style, his dancing, everything". He also credited Jackson's humanitarian work for inspiring his own charitable work. He also admired Marvin Gaye and Quincy Jones, and was a fan of Chrisye.

== Discography ==
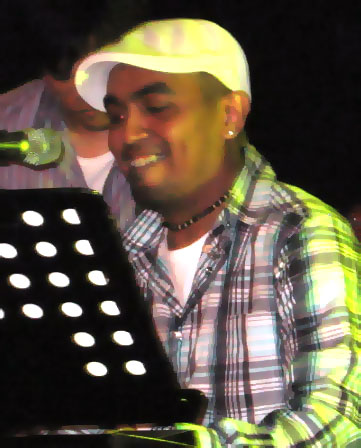
Latuihamallo during performance in the Netherlands in 2005.

=== Albums ===
- GLENN (1998)
- Kembali (Return, 2000)
- Selamat Pagi, Dunia (Good Morning, World, 2003)
- Selamat Pagi, Dunia (Repackaged, 2004)
- OST Cinta Silver (2005)
- Aku dan Wanita (I and Women, 2006)
- Terang (Light, 2006)
- Happy Sunday (2007)
- Private Collection (2008)
- Lovevolution (2010)
- Luka, Cinta & Merdeka (Blood, Love and Freedom, 2012)
- Live at Lokananta (2013)
- Romansa ke Masa Depan (Romance to The Future, 2019)

=== Movies ===
- ? (2011)
- Cahaya Dari Timur: Beta Maluku (2014)
- Filosofi Kopi (2015)
- Surat dari Praha (2016)
- Pretty Boys (2019)
