= Indonesian Idol season 4 =

Indonesian Idol
- Season 4
- Hosted by: Daniel Mananta; Amelia Natasha
- Judges: Indra Lesmana; Titi DJ; Anang Hermansyah; Jamie Aditya
- Winner: Rini Wulandari
- Runner-up: Wilson Maiseka
- Finals venue: Balai Sarbini, South Jakarta

Release
- Original network: RCTI MNC Entertainment Re Run
- Original release: March 30 – July 28, 2007

Season chronology
- ← Previous; Season 3 Next → Season 5

Indonesian Idol (season 4)
- Finalists (with dates of elimination)
Rini Wulandari	Winner
Wilson Maiseka	July 28
Gabriela Christy	July 13
Sarah Hadju	July 6
Fandy Santoso	June 29
Dimas Mochammad	June 22
Julian Anthony	June 15
Priska Paramita	June 8
Steve Wowiling	June 1
Marsya Nada	May 25
Gana Eka	May 18
Rismawati	May 11

The 4th season of Indonesian Idol premiered on RCTI on March 30, 2007 and concluded on July 28, 2007. Daniel Mananta and Ata continued to host the show. On the workshop round plus the first two spectacular show, Daniel hosted the show alone due to Ata's pregnancy. Ata started joining Daniel back hosting the show on the third spectacular show. Additionally, Nirina Zubir and Indra Bekti were also announced as the hosts of Idol Banget, a behind-the-scenes show of Indonesian Idol.

Changes were made to the judging team this season. While Titi DJ and Indra Lesmana returned as the judges, due to scheduling difficulties of their career, Indy Barends and Dimas Djayadiningrat had resigned from judging the fourth season of Indonesian Idol. They both were replaced by Anang Hermansyah and Jamie Aditya. Anang, who is the husband of Indonesia's most famous Pop Diva, Krisdayanti, is also known as an established musician as well as a music producer. Jamie Aditya, was a Video Jockey during MTV Asia early years. Tika Panggabean served as guest judge several times during the temporary absence of judges Titi DJ and Jamie Aditya.

Rini Wulandari was announced the winner of the competition on July 28, 2007, defeating runner-up Wilson Maiseka after nearly 2.4 million votes. The split between the two was 51.2 percent to 48.8 percent. After winning, Rini sang the song "Aku Tetap Milikmu", which was the winning song of the Idol Song Competition.

== Early process ==
On Wednesday, January 10, 2007, FremantleMedia Asia officially launched the fourth edition of award-winning Indonesian Idols. The show was initially announced at the 2006 Panasonic Awards when the Indonesian Idols judges were on hand to receive the award for the Best Music and Variety Show. The 4th season commercial also has been airing in RCTI prior to the official launch date. In the official Indonesian Idols website, it was stated that starting from Season 4, future Idols participants can register online and print the audition form rather than using the current registration process which might take up to a whole day to complete. This season saw a big jump in number of applicants. More than 90,000 people turned up for the auditions. Contestants were required to be between the ages 16–28.

=== Auditions ===
Auditions were held in the following cities:

Audition City	Date	Audition Venue
Medan	January 7–8, 2007	Taman Budaya
Manado	January 7–8, 2007	Boulevard Mall
Banjarmasin	January 10–11, 2007	Gedung Kopertis
Ambon	January 10–11, 2007	Taman Budaya Karang Panjang
Semarang	January 16–17, 2007	Gajahmada Hall
Denpasar	January 16–17, 2007	Mall Bali Galeria
Palembang	January 23–24, 2007	Palembang Indah Mall
Manokwari	January 23–24, 2007	Hotel Mutiara
Makassar	January 26–27, 2007	Hotel Clarion
Surabaya	February 5–7, 2007	Balai Kartika Makodam
Bandung	February 12–14, 2007	Braga City Walk
Jakarta	February 19–22, 2007	Balai Kartini

== Elimination round ==
Elimination round was held from March 5–7, 2007 at Gedung Kesenian Jakarta. A total of 95 were selected from the twelve audition cities. In the first round, contestants each sang an a cappella solo performance of song of their choice, after which the judges selected who would go home and advance to the next round. The second round had the contestants performing in groups of three. Those who made it to next round performed one more solo song (minus-one). They were cut once again to twenty-four contestants.

== Workshop Round ==
This season featured 24 contestants instead of 28. In addition, instead of one workshop round every week, the workshop round aired every day in marathon at 10PM West Indonesia Time, and there was a separate results show on the following night in the same timeslot.

The schedule was as follows:

- April 16: Top 12 Male Semifinalists Perform
- April 17: Live Result Show (Three Male Contestants Eliminated)
- April 18: Top 12 Female Semifinalists Perform
- April 19: Live Result Show (Three Female Contestants Eliminated)
- April 20: Top 9 Male Semifinalists Perform
- April 21: Live Result Show (Two Male Contestants Eliminated)
- April 23: Top 9 Female Semifinalists Perform
- April 24: Live Result Show (Two Female Contestants Eliminated)
- April 25: Top 7 Male Semifinalists Perform
- April 26: Top 7 Female Semifinalists Perform
- April 27: Live Result Show (Two Male and Two Female Contestants Eliminated, Top 10 Finalists Announced)

=== Top 24 ===
Order	Females			Males		
Order	Contestant	Song (original artist)	Result	Contestant	Song (original artist)	Result
1	Ayu	"Lelaki Buaya Darat" (Ratu)	Eliminated	Steve	"Pecinta Wanita" (Irwansyah)	Safe
2	Vazza	"Cobalah Untuk Setia" (Krisdayanti)	Eliminated	Gana	"Ruang Rindu" (Letto)	Safe
3	Marsya	"Separuh Hidupku" (Titi DJ)	Safe	Benny	"Akhirnya Ku Menemukanmu" (Naff)	Eliminated
4	Andin	"Sampai Menutup Mata" (Acha)	Safe	Dimas	"Sobat" (Padi)	Safe
5	Sarah	"I Miss U But I Hate U" (Slank)	Safe	Adi	"Kejujuran Hati" (Kerispatih)	Eliminated
6	Rini	"Cintai Aku Lagi" (Sania)	Safe	Franky	"Karena Wanita" (ADA Band)	Safe
7	Risma	"Jangan Bilang Siapa-siapa" (Ratu)	Safe	Fandy	"Kau" (Ello)	Safe
8	Yasmin	"Kini"	Safe	Eddo	"Kasih Putih" (Glenn Fredly)	Safe
9	Gaby	"Kubahagia" (Melly Goeslaw)	Safe	Rhey	"Hapus Aku" (Nidji)	Eliminated
10	Asty	"Aku Tak Mau Sendiri" (Bunga Citra Lestari)	Safe	Wilson	"Akhir Rasa Ini" (Samsons)	Safe
11	Priska	"Takkan Terganti" (Dea Mirella)	Safe	Julian	"Cinta Putih" (Kerispatih)	Safe
12	Devi	"Bukan Milikmu Lagi" (Agnes Monica)	Eliminated	Hany	"Haruskah Kumati" (ADA Band)	Safe

=== Top 18 ===
Order	Females			Males		
Order	Contestant	Song (original artist)	Result	Contestant	Song (original artist)	Result
1	Rini	"Kuakui" (Dewi Sandra)	Safe	Wilson	"Malam Ini" (Koes Plus)	Safe
2	Priska	"Cinta Mati" (Agnes Monica)	Safe	Franky	"Sedang Ingin Bercinta" (Dewa)	Safe
3	Asty	"Jadikan Aku Yang Kedua" (Astrid)	Eliminated	Dimas	"Setengah Hati" (ADA Band)	Eliminated
4	Risma	"Kau" (T-Five)	Safe	Eddo	"Dealova" (Once)	Eliminated
5	Marsya	"Semua Jadi Satu" (3 Diva)	Safe	Hany	"Kisah Romantis" (Glenn Fredly)	Safe
6	Gaby	"Pelangi Di Matamu" (Jamrud)	Safe	Steve	"Bintang Di Surga" (Peterpan)	Safe
7	Andin	"Sampai Di Sini" (Ecoutez)	Eliminated	Julian	"Bukan Untukmu" (Rio Febrian)	Safe
8	Sarah	"Andai Ku Tahu" (Ungu)	Safe	Gana	"Naluri Lelaki" (Samsons)	Safe
9	Yasmin	"Kau" (Bunglon)	Safe	Fandy	"Hampa" (Ari Lasso)	Safe

=== Top 14 ===
Order	Females			Males		
Order	Contestant	Song (original artist)	Result	Contestant	Song (original artist)	Result
1	Sarah	"Begitu Indah" (Padi)	Safe	Gana	"Arjuna" (Dewa)	Safe
2	Rini	"Percayalah" (Ecoutez)	Safe	Steve	"Demi Waktu" (Ungu)	Safe
3	Yasmin	"Pesta" (Elfa's Singer)	Eliminated	Julian	"Bayang Semu" (Ungu)	Safe
4	Gaby	"Jenuh" (Rio Febrian)	Safe	Hany	"Aku Cinta Kau dan Dia" (Dewa)	Eliminated
5	Risma	"Cinta Takkan Usai" (Pinkan Mambo)	Safe	Fandy	"Rahasia Perempuan" (Ari Lasso)	Safe
6	Priska	"Pudar" (Rossa)	Eliminated	Franky	"Rahasia Hati" (Element)	Eliminated
7	Marsya	"Bunda" (Melly Goeslaw)	Safe	Wilson	"Kupu Kupu Malam" (Titiek Puspa)	Safe

=== Wild Card Round ===
Four of the eliminated contestants were selected by the judges to compete in the wild-card round. Two contestants advanced to the final group of 12.

Order	Contestant	Song (original artist)	Result
1	Priska	"Aku Melangkah Lagi"(Vina Panduwinata)	Safe
2	Dimas	"Badai Pasti Berlalu" (Ari Lasso)	Safe
3	Andin	"Seindah Biasa" (Siti Nurhaliza)	Eliminated
4	Benny	"Cemburu" (Dewa)	Eliminated

== Spectacular Show ==
=== Finalists ===
Contestant	Date of birth	Hometown / Audition City
Rini Wulandari (Rini)	April 28, 1990	Medan, North Sumatra
Wilson Simon Maiseka (Wilson)	August 24, 1989	Ambon, Maluku
Gabriela Christy (Gaby)	December 29, 1989	Bandung, West Java
Siti Sabariah Hadju (Sarah)	May 25, 1980	Jakarta, DKI Jakarta
Fandy Santoso (Fandy)	April 26, 1985	Surabaya, East Java
Dimas Mochammad (Dimas)	September 10, 1986	Bandung, West Java
Julian Anthony Syahputra (Julian)	July 20, 1988	Bandung, West Java
Priska Paramita (Priska)	May 22, 1989	Makassar, South Sulawesi
Stevano Andrie Wowiling (Steve)	September 10, 1989	Manado, North Sulawesi
Nabila Marsya Nada (Marsya)	March 14, 1991	Jakarta, DKI Jakarta
Gede Arya Gana Eka (Gana)	May 25, 1985	Denpasar, Bali
Rismawati (Risma)	September 1, 1982	Bandung, West Java

=== Spectacular Show 1 – Hits Number 1 ===
Order	Contestant	Song (original artist)	Result
1	Rini	"50 Tahun Lagi"(Warna)	Safe
2	Gana	"Dengan Nafasmu" (Samsons)	Bottom 3
3	Gaby	"Inikah Cinta" (ME)	Safe
4	Fandy	"Firasat" (Marcell Siahaan)	Safe
5	Wilson	"Ku Ada Disini" (Rio Febrian)	Safe
6	Risma	"Terbang" (The Fly)	Eliminated
7	Priska	"Mimpi"(Anggun)	Safe
8	Steve	"Kau Masih Kekasihku"(Naff)	Bottom 3
9	Marsya	"Kuingin" (Ruth Sahanaya)	Safe
10	Dimas	"Topeng" (Peterpan)	Safe
11	Julian	"Lebih Baik Darinya" (Rio Febrian)	Safe
12	Sarah	"Mistikus Cinta" (Dewa)	Safe

=== Spectacular Show 2 – Rock n Roll ===
Order	Contestant	Song (original artist)	Result
1	Marsya	"Takut" (Anggun)	Safe
2	Fandy	"Jangan Ada Angkara"(Nicky Astria)	Safe
3	Priska	"Luka Lama" (Cokelat)	Bottom 3
4	Steve	"Berakit-rakit" (Jamrud)	Safe
5	Sarah	"Karma"(Cokelat)	Safe
6	Dimas	"Pangeran Cinta" (Dewa)	Safe
7	Gaby	"I Don’t Wanna Miss A Thing" (Aerosmith)	Bottom 3
8	Gana	"Elang" (Dewa)	Eliminated
9	Wilson	"Terbang"(Gigi)	Safe
10	Rini	"Antara Ada dan Tiada" (Utopia)	Safe
11	Julian	"Faith" (George Michael)	Safe

=== Spectacular Show 3 – Ungkapan Hati ===
Mentor: Harvey Malaiholo

Order	Contestant	Song (original artist)	Result
1	Julian	"Ough"(ADA Band)	Safe
2	Dimas	"Kasih Tak Sampai" (Padi)	Bottom 3
3	Gaby	"Cinta Di Ujung Jalan" (Agnes Monica)	Safe
4	Fandy	"Selamat Datang Cinta" (Harvey Malaiholo)	Safe
5	Sarah	"Aku Bukan Pilihan" (Iwan Fals)	Bottom 3
6	Steve	"Kukatakan Dengan Indah" (Peterpan)	Safe
7	Marsya	"Yang Terbaik Bagimu"(ADA Band)	Eliminated
8	Priska	"Pupus"(Dewa)	Safe
9	Wilson	"Kala Cinta Menggoda" (Chrisye)	Safe
10	Rini	"Because You Loved Me" (Celine Dion)	Safe

=== Spectacular Show 4 – Persembahanku ===
Mentor: Vina Panduwinata

Order	Contestant	Song (original artist)	Result
1	Fandy	"Indah, Kuingat Dirimu"(Yovie & The Nuno)	Safe
2	Priska	"Stand Up For Love" (Destiny's Child)	Safe
3	Steve	"Bunga Terakhir" (Bebi Romeo)	Eliminated
4	Rini	"Jera" (Agnes Monica)	Safe
5	Dimas	"Angin" (Dewa)	Bottom 3
6	Julian	"Cinta Terakhir" (Gigi)	Bottom 3
7	Sarah	"All I Wanna Do"(Sheryl Crow)	Safe
8	Wilson	"Kuta Bali"(Andre Hehanusa)	Safe
9	Gaby	"Dansa Yok Dansa" (Glenn Fredly)	Safe

=== Spectacular Show 5 – Musik 4 Dekade ===
Mentor: Yovie Widianto

Order	Contestant	Song (original artist)	Result
1	Rini	"I Love You"(Dewi Sandra)	Safe
2	Julian	"Nuansa Bening" (Keenan Nasution)	Safe
3	Sarah	"Sinaran" (Sheila Majid)	Bottom 3
4	Priska	"Jatuh Cinta"(Titiek Puspa)	Eliminated
5	Dimas	"Tentang Kita" (KLA Project)	Bottom 3
6	Gaby	"Mengertilah Kasih" (Ruth Sahanaya)	Safe
7	Wilson	"Salahkah" (Tompi)	Safe
8	Fandy	"Kisah Tak Sempurna"(Samsons)	Safe

=== Spectacular Show 6 – Movie Soundtrack ===
Order	Contestant	Song (original artist) — Film	Result
1	Fandy	"Mengejar Matahari"(Ari Lasso) — Mengejar Matahari	Safe
2	Gaby	"Cinta Pertama (Sunny)" (Bunga Citra Lestari) — Cinta Pertama	Safe
3	Wilson	"Serasa" (Ello) — Badai Pasti Berlalu	Safe
4	Rini	"Matahari" (Berlian Hutauruk) — Badai Pasti Berlalu	Safe
5	Dimas	"Cinta" (Melly Goeslaw & Krisdayanti) — Tentang Dia	Bottom 3
6	Julian	"Dunia Tanpa Lagu" (Delon Thamrin) — Vina Bilang Cinta	Eliminated
7	Sarah	"Can’t Help Falling in Love"(Elvis Presley) — Lilo & Stitch	Bottom 3

=== Spectacular Show 7 – Percussion Night ===
Order	Contestant	Song (original artist)	Result
1	Wilson	"Rame-rame"(Glenn Fredly)	Safe
2	Gaby	"Jangan Buang Waktu" (Ruth Sahanaya)	Safe
3	Fandy	"Permaisuriku" (Kahitna)	Safe
4	Sarah	"Rembulan" (Krisdayanti)	Bottom 2
5	Dimas	"Cerita Lalu" (Bunglon)	Eliminated
6	Rini	"Conga" (Gloria Estefan & Miami Sound Machine)	Safe

=== Spectacular Show 8 – Masterpiece ===
Order	Contestant	Song (original artist)	Result
1	Sarah	"Karena Cinta" (Joy Tobing)	Safe
2	Gaby	"Semua Untuk Cinta"(Mike Mohede)	Safe
3	Fandy	"Merindumu" (Delon Thamrin)	Eliminated
4	Rini	"Cinta Jangan Kau Pergi" (Sheila Majid)	Bottom 2
5	Wilson	"Kemenangan Hati" (Ghea & Dirly)	Safe

=== Spectacular Show 9 – Tribute to Chrisye ===
Each contestant sang two songs.

Order	Contestant	Song (original artist)	Result
1	Gaby	"Setia" (Chrisye)	Safe
2	Rini	"Seperti Yang Kau Minta" (Chrisye)	Safe
3	Wilson	"Panah Asmara" (Chrisye)	Bottom 2
4	Sarah	"Cintaku"(Chrisye)	Eliminated
5	Gaby	"Damai Bersamamu" (Chrisye)	Safe
6	Rini	"Zamrud Khatulistiwa"(Chrisye)	Safe
7	Wilson	"Kisah Cintaku" (Chrisye)	Bottom 2
8	Sarah	"Khayalku" (Chrisye)	Eliminated

=== Spectacular Show 10 – Tantangan ===
Each contestant sang two songs.

Order	Contestant	Song (original artist)	Result
1	Wilson	"Barcelona"(Fariz RM)	Safe
2	Gaby	"My Heart Will Go On" (Celine Dion)	Eliminated
3	Rini	"Cinta" (Titiek Puspa)	Safe
4	Wilson	"Dealova" (Once)	Safe
5	Gaby	"Kaulah Segalanya"(Ruth Sahanaya)	Eliminated
6	Rini	"Emotions" (Mariah Carey)	Safe

=== Grand Finale ===
Each contestant sang three songs, including judges' choice, The Best Of Spectacular Show & the winner's single.

Order	Contestant	Song (original artist)	Result
1	Rini	"Warna" (Sheila Majid)	Winner
2	Wilson	"Tersiksa Lagi" (Utha Likumahua)	Runner-Up
3	Rini	"Because You Loved Me" (Celine Dion)	Winner
4	Wilson	"Salahkah" (Tompi)	Runner-Up
5	Rini	"Aku Tetap Milikmu"	Winner
6	Wilson	"Aku Tetap Milikmu"	Runner-Up

Withover 10,000 viewers at Balai Sarbini during the Grand Final, it doubled the projection of the producer. Claimed as the largest, most glorious and the best Grand Final of all Idol shows, it beat American Idol in terms of stage size, design, lighting, and sound system. At the same venue a week later, The Result and Reunion Show was held. It had a star-studded list of entertainers making an appearance, including Dewi Sandra, Harvey Malaiholo, Vina Panduwinata, Krisdayanti, Ungu, The Fly, Gita Gutawa, judges Indra Lesmana and Titi DJ, as well as past Idol contestants. For the first time in history, Rini, one of the Grand Finalist (later become the winner), had the chance to sing with Indonesia's music divas, Titi DJ and Krisdayanti.

=== Guest performances ===
Week	Performer(s)
Spectacular 1	Radja
Spectacular 2	/rif
Spectacular 3	Samsons
Spectacular 4	Letto
Spectacular 5	Nidji
Spectacular 6
Spectacular 6	Sherina
Spectacular 6	Krisdayanti
Spectacular 7	Maia Ahmad
Spectacular 7	Bunga Citra Lestari
Spectacular 7	Astrid
Spectacular 7	Terry
Spectacular 8	Naff
Spectacular 8	Idol Divo^{1}
Spectacular 9	Ari Lasso
Spectacular 9	Idol Diva^{2}
Spectacular 10	Kerispatih
Spectacular 10	Ihsan, Dirly, Gea

^{1} Four alumni of Indonesian Idol, including winner Mike Mohede, Delon, Judika, Lucky performed in a group called Idol Divo.
^{2} Idol Diva consisted of several previous Indonesian Idol contestants, including Nania, Winda, Karen, Sisi, Monita.

== Elimination Chart ==
Females	Males	Top 24	Wild card	Top 12	Winner

Did not perform	Safe	Safe First	Safe last	Eliminated

Stage:		Semi-finals			Wild card	Finals										
Date:		4/13	4/20	4/27	5/4	5/11	5/18	5/25	6/1	6/8	6/15	6/22	6/29	7/6	7/13	7/18
Place	Contestant	Result														
1	Rini Wulandari			Top 12									Bottom 2			Winner
2	Wilson Maiseka			Top 12										Bottom 2		Runner-Up
3	Gabriela Christy			Top 12			Bottom 3								Elim	
4	Sarah Hadja			Top 12				Bottom 3		Bottom 3	Bottom 3	Bottom 2		Elim		
5	Fandy Santoso			Top 12									Elim			
6	Dimas Mochammad		Elim		Top 12			Bottom 3	Bottom 3	Bottom 3	Bottom 3	Elim				
7	Julian Anthony			Top 12					Bottom 3		Elim					
8	Priska Paramita			Elim	Top 12		Bottom 3			Elim						
9	Steve Wowiling			Top 12		Bottom 3			Elim							
10	Marsya Nada			Top 12				Elim								
11	Gana Eka			Top 12		Bottom 3	Elim									
12	Rismawati			Top 12		Elim										
13-14	Benny Irawan S. Uno	Elim			Elim											
13-14	Liandini Pangastuti		Elim		Elim											
15-17	Hany Franky Pattikawa			Elim												
15-17	Franky Anthony			Elim												
15-17	Nur Yasmin Sungkar			Elim												
18-19	Asty Pujisari		Elim													
18-19	Eddy R.C.Marien		Elim													
20-24	Adi Damayanto	Elim														
20-24	Ayu Dyah Perwitasari	Elim														
20-24	Deviana Oktariana	Elim														
20-24	Riodika Sukmawan	Elim														
20-24	Vazza Dite Mulya	Elim														

Preceded by Indonesian Idol (season 3)	Indonesian Idol; 2007	Succeeded by Indonesian Idol (season 5)
