= Indonesian Idol season 2 =

Indonesian Idol
- Season 2
- Hosted by: Irgy Ahmad Fahrezi; Amelia Natasha
- Judges: Indra Lesmana; Titi DJ; Meuthia Kasim; Yovie Widianto; Dimas Djayadiningrat
- Winner: Mike Mohede
- Runner-up: Judika
- Finals venue: Balai Sarbini

Release
- Original network: RCTI
- Original release: 25 March – 13 August 2005

Season chronology
- ← Previous; Season 1 Next → Season 3

The second season of Indonesian Idol premiered on 25 March 2005 and continued until 13 August 2005. It was co-hosted by Amelia Natasha and Irgy Ahmad Fahrezi. Indra Lesmana, Titi DJ and Meuthia Kasim judged from audition round till spectacular show, while Yovie Widianto replaced Dimas Djayadiningrat in audition round till workshop round before being replaced again with Dimas Djayadiningrat. Mike Mohede won the season with Judika as the runner-up, Firman Siagian finishing third and Monita Tahalea finishing fourth. This was the first season to have a finale with two male contestants, with the third season being the second.

== Auditions ==
All of the Auditions were held In five cities: Surabaya, Bandung, Makassar, Yogyakarta and Jakarta.

== Workshop ==
=== Group 1 ===
Order	Contestant	Song (original artist)	Result
1	Starqueen Victorious	"Arti Hadirmu" (Audy Item)	Eliminated
2	Hendra Purnanto	"Mendendam" (Marcell)	Eliminated
3	Tiara Soemawilaga	"Hey" (Fatima Rainey)	Eliminated
4	Firman Siagian	"Everything I do, I do it for you" (Bryan Adams)	Safe
5	Sylvia Damayanti	"Pertama" (Reza Artamevia)	Safe
6	Wisnu Yoga Prabowo	"Lebih Baik Darinya" (Rio Febrian)	Safe
7	Gamila Mustika	"Biru" (Vina Panduwinata)	Eliminated
8	Mike Mohede	"Right Here Waiting" (Richard Marx )	Safe

=== Group 2 ===
Order	Contestant	Song (original artist)	Result
1	Judika Sihotang	"Sedih Tak Berujung" (Glenn Fredly)	Safe
2	Sri Rizki Nuryulianti	"Kiss Me" (Sixpence None the Richer)	Eliminated
3	Ronald Silitonga	"Akhir Cerita Cinta" (Glenn Fredly)	Safe
4	Andrian Pramono	"This Love" (Maroon 5)	Eliminated
5	Nikita Fima Atriyu	"How do I Live" (Trisha Yearwood)	Eliminated
6	Harry Indra Mantong	"Pergi Untuk Kembali" (Ello)	Safe
7	Mila Amelia	"Bilang Saja" (Agnes Monica)	Eliminated
8	Yudi Manupassa	"You'll be in My Heart" (Usher )	Safe

=== Group 3 ===
Order	Contestant	Song (original artist)	Result
1	Jamil Ichsan	"Cintaku" (Chrisye)	Eliminated
2	Retno Mayang Sari	"Mengertilah Kasih" (Ruth Sahanaya)	Eliminated
3	Alfattah	"Melompat Lebih Tinggi" (Sheila on 7)	Eliminated
4	Shinta Dewi	"Keabadian" (Reza Artamevia)	Eliminated
5	Danar Indra	"Kasih Putih" (Glenn Fredly)	Safe
6	Monita Tahalea	"Milikmu Selalu" (Andien)	Safe
7	Glenn Johannes Waas	"Ketika Kau Menyapa" (Marcell)	Safe
8	Vira Puspitasari	"Sang Dewi" (Titi DJ )	Safe

== Spectacular Show ==
=== Spectacular Show 1 – Indonesian Top Hits ===
Order	Contestant	Song (original artist)	Result
1	Judika	"Karma" (Cokelat)	Safe
2	Yudi	"Manusia Bodoh" (ADA Band)	Bottom 3
3	Firman	"Gara-Gara Kamu" (Slank)	Safe
4	Maya	"Kini" (Rossa)	Safe
5	Danar	"Rahasia Perempuan" (Ari Lasso)	Eliminated
6	Harry	"Kukatakan Dengan Indah" (Peterpan)	Safe
7	Glenn	"Seperti Yang Kau Minta" (Chrisye)	Safe
8	Monita Tahalea	"Lagu Sendu" (Audy Item)	Safe
9	Wisnu	"Aku Ada Disini" (Rio Febrian)	Safe
10	Vira	"Indah" (Agnes Monica)	Bottom 3
11	Ronald	"Masih" (ADA Band)	Safe
12	Mike	"Pupus" (Dewa 19)	Safe

=== Spectacular Show 2 – Band Hits ===
Order	Contestant	Song (original artist)	Result
1	Maya	"Kita Tidak Sedang Bercinta Lagi" (Dewa 19)	Bottom 3
2	Ronald	"Kau Yang Terindah" (Java Jive)	Eliminated
3	Wisnu	"Dahulu" (The Groove)	Safe
4	Yudi	"Tak Bisa Kelain Hati" (KLA Project)	Safe
5	Vira	"1000 Tahun Lamanya" (Jikustik)	Safe
6	Judika	"Terlalu Manis" (Slank)	Safe
7	Mike	"Kamulah Satu-Satunya" (Dewa 19)	Safe
8	Monita Tahalea	"Bagaikan Langit" (Potret)	Safe
9	Harry	"Cantik" (Kahitna)	Safe
10	Glenn	"Pelangi di Matamu" (Jamrud)	Bottom 3
11	Firman	"Loe Toe Ye" (/rif)	Safe

=== Spectacular Show 3 – 90's ===
Order	Contestant	Song (original artist)	Result
1	Firman	"Dan" (Sheila on 7)	Safe
2	Judika	"This I Promise You" (Richard Marx)	Safe
3	Maya	"Satu Mimpiku" (The Groove)	Safe
4	Vira	"Rindu Ini" (Warna)	Safe
5	Mike	"Percayalah" (Titi DJ)	Safe
6	Harry	"Esok kan Masih Ada" (Utha Likumahua)	Bottom 3
7	Yudi	"Sobat" (Padi)	Bottom 3
8	Monita Tahalea	"Bintang-Bintang" (Titi DJ)	Safe
9	Wisnu	"Salah" (Potret)	Eliminated
10	Glenn	"Lately" (Stevie Wonder)	Safe

=== Spectacular Show 4 – Upbeat Songs ===
Order	Contestant	Song (original artist)	Result
1	Vira	"Berharap Tak Berpisah" (Reza Artamevia)	Eliminated
2	Harry	"Tanda-Tanda" (Mus Mulijono)	Safe
3	Glenn	"Terpesona" (Glenn Fredly)	Bottom 3
4	Monita Tahalea	"Surat Cinta" (Vina Panduwinata)	Safe
5	Firman	"Hard to Handle" (The Black Crowes)	Safe
6	Maya	"Rembulan" (Krisdayanti)	Bottom 3
7	Mike	"Sinaran" (Sheila Madjid)	Safe
8	Judika	"Puncak Asmara" (Utha Likumahua)	Safe
9	Yudi	"Senorita" (Justin Timberlake)	Safe

=== Spectacular Show 5 – Rock ===
Order	Contestant	Song (original artist)	Result
1	Yudi	"Terbang" (The Fly)	Eliminated
2	Monita Tahalea	"Don't Speak" (No Doubt)	Safe
3	Glenn	"Begitu Indah" (Padi)	Bottom 3
4	Harry	"It's My Life" (Bon Jovi)	Bottom 3
5	Firman	"Cemburu" (Dewa 19)	Safe
6	Judika	"Rocker Juga Manusia" (Seurieus)	Safe
7	Maya	"Since U Been Gone" (Kelly Clarkson)	Safe
8	Mike	"Mengejar Matahari" (Ari Lasso)	Safe

=== Spectacular Show 6 – My Idols ===
Order	Contestant	Song (original artist)	Result
1	Harry	"Andai" (Gigi)	Safe
2	Maya	"Seindah Biasa" (Siti Nurhaliza)	Bottom 3
3	Glenn	"Karena Kutahu Engkau Begitu" (Andre Hehanussa)	Eliminated
4	Mike	"Nada Kasih" (Fariz RM)	Safe
5	Firman	"Mistikus Cinta" (Dewa 19)	Safe
6	Monita Tahalea	"Menangis Semalam" (Audy Item)	Bottom 3
7	Judika	"Hampa" (Ari Lasso)	Safe

=== Spectacular Show 7 – Legends ===
Order	Contestant	Song (original artist)	Result
1	Mike	"Crazy Little Thing Called Love" (Queen)	Safe
2	Monita Tahalea	"Oh La La" (Koes Plus)	Safe
3	Harry	"Merpati Putih" (Chrisye)	Bottom 3
4	Maya	"Satu Dalam Nada Cinta" (Vina Panduwinata)	Eliminated
5	Judika	"Making Love Out of Nothing at All" (Air Supply)	Safe
6	Firman	"Bento" (Iwan Fals)	Bottom 3

== Elimination chart ==
Safe First	Safe Last	Eliminated

Stage:		Spectacular Show										Finale
Week:		27/5	3/6	10/6	17/6	24/6	1/7	8/7	15/7	22/7	29/7	13/8
Position	Contestant	Result										
1	Mike Mohede								Bottom 3	Bottom 2		Winner
2	Judika Sihotang											Runner-up
3	Firman Siagian							Bottom 3			Elim	
4	Monita Tahalea						Bottom 3		Bottom 3	Elim		
5	Harry Indra Mantong			Bottom 3		Bottom 3		Bottom 3	Elim			
6	Maya Damayanti		Bottom 3		Bottom 3		Bottom 3	Elim				
7	Glenn Johannes Waas		Bottom 3		Bottom 3	Bottom 3	Elim					
8	Yudi Manupassa	Bottom 3		Bottom 3		Elim						
9	Vira Puspitasari	Bottom 3			Elim							
10	Wisnu Yoga Prabowo			Elim								
11	Ronald Silitonga		Elim									
12	Danar Kurniawan	Elim										

== Statistics ==
Tanggal	3 Terbawah
28 May	Danar	Vira	Yudi
4 June	Ronald	Glenn	Maya
11 June	Wisnu	Yudi (2)	Harry
18 June	Vira (2)	Maya (2)	Glenn (2)
24 June	Yudi (3)	Harry (2)	Glenn (3)
2 July	Glenn (4)	Monita	Maya (3)
9 July	Maya (4)	Firman	Harry (3)
16 July	Harry (4)	Monita (2)	Mike
Tanggal	2 Terbawah
23 July	Monita (3)	Mike (2)
30 July	Firman (2)
13 August	Judika	Mike

Preceded by Indonesian Idol	Indonesian Idol; 2005	Succeeded by Indonesian Idol
