= Indonesian Idol season 3 =

Indonesian Idol
- Season 3
- Hosted by: Daniel Mananta; Amelia Natasha
- Judges: Indra Lesmana; Titi DJ; Indy Barends; Dimas Djayadiningrat
- Winner: Ihsan Tarore
- Runner-up: Dirly Sompie
- Finals venue: Istora Senayan

Release
- Original network: RCTI
- Original release: April 21 – August 19, 2006

Season chronology
- ← Previous; Season 2 Next → Season 4

Indonesian Idol (season 3)
- Finalists (with dates of elimination)
Ihsan Tarore	Winner
Dirly Sompie	August 19
Ghea Oktarin	August 4
Sanobo Sasamu	July 28
Maria Priscilla	July 21
Ilham Basso	July 14
Christy Podung	July 7
Sisi Hapsari	June 30
Brinet Sudjana	June 23
Tesa Sumendra	June 16
Lee Kulalean	June 9
Elisabeth Depe	June 2

The third season of Indonesian Idol aired on April 21, 2006 and concluded on August 19, 2006. Indra Lesmana, Titi DJ and Dimas Djayadiningrat all returned as judges, and Indy Barends replaced Meuthia Kasim as the fourth judge. Indy was a former host of talk show Ceriwis. VJ MTV Daniel Mananta was introduced as the new host on Indonesian Idol replacing Irgi Fahrezi.

Ihsan Tarore won the competition with Dirly Sompie as the first runner-up and Ghea Oktarin finishing third. It was the second season to have a finale with two male contestants, with the second season being the first.

== Auditions ==
Auditions were held in five cities in the following order:

Audition City	Date	Audition Venue
Medan	February 24–26, 2006	Griya Dome
Yogyakarta	March 2–5, 2006	Jogja Expo Center
Surabaya	March 9–12, 2006	Balai Kartika Makodam
Bandung	March 17–19, 2006	Sasana Budaya Ganesha
Jakarta	March 23–25, 2006	Jakarta International Expo

== Elimination round ==
The elimination rounds were held from April 11–13, 2006.

== Workshop Round ==
The workshop round featured 28 contestants divided by gender with the 14 male contestants singing on Fridays and the 14 female contestants on Saturdays. There were three shows each week for the three weeks of the workshop rounds.

=== Top 28 ===
Order	Males			Females		
Order	Contestant	Song (original artist)	Result	Contestant	Song (original artist)	Result
1	Arif	"Jemu"	Eliminated	Sisi	"Sinaran" (Sheila Majid)	Safe
2	Kaleb	"Mengejar Matahari" (Ari Lasso)	Safe	Izma	"Pilihlah Aku" (Krisdayanti)	Eliminated
3	Omar	"Firasat" (Marcell)	Safe	Yara	"Bawa Daku Pergi" (Ruth Sahanaya)	Eliminated
4	Nobo	"Rocker Juga Manusia" (Seurieus)	Safe	Diana	"Dahulu" (The Groove)	Safe
5	Gleno	"Kejujuran Hati" (Kerispatih)	Safe	Tia	"Seperti Yang Kau Minta" (Chrisye)	Safe
6	Rivi	"Arti Cinta" (Ari Lasso)	Eliminated	Gea	"Aku Ini Punya Siapa" (January Christy)	Safe
7	Richard	"Semusim" (Marcell)	Eliminated	Depe	"Berhenti Berharap" (Sheila On 7)	Safe
8	Ilham	"Inikah Cinta" (ME)	Safe	Flora	"Kuingin" (Ruth Sahanaya)	Eliminated
9	Robin	"Hampa" (Ari Lasso)	Safe	Liz	"Luka Lama" (Cokelat)	Eliminated
10	Aris	"Cinta Sejati" (Ari Lasso)	Eliminated	Alice	"Salah" (Potret)	Safe
11	Tesa	"Kau" (Ello ft. Glenn Fredly)	Safe	Dian	"Seindah Biasa" (Siti Nurhaliza)	Safe
12	Ihsan	"Ku Tak Bisa" (Slank)	Safe	Brinet	"Satu Mimpiku" (The Groove)	Safe
13	Dirly	"Naluri Lelaki" (Samsons)	Safe	Christy	"Cinta Jangan Kau Pergi" (Sheila Majid)	Safe
14	Lee	"Selalu Denganmu" (Tompi)	Safe	Maria	"Cinta Kita" (Reza)	Safe

=== Top 20 ===
Order	Males			Females		
Order	Contestant	Song (original artist)	Result	Contestant	Song (original artist)	Result
1	Dirly	"Pangeran Cinta" (Dewa)	Safe	Brinet	"Kuakui" (Dewi Sandra)	Safe
2	Robin	"Cinta Putih" (Kerispatih)	Eliminated	Maria	"Oh, Kasih" (Shanty)	Safe
3	Ilham	"Kupu-Kupu Malam" (Titiek Puspa)	Safe	Dian	"Aku Bukan Untukmu" (Rossa)	Eliminated
4	Tesa	"Sekali Ini Saja" (Glenn Fredly)	Safe	Diana	"Menangis Semalam" (Audy)	Eliminated
5	Gleno	"Cantik" (Kahitna)	Eliminated	Tia	"Terdiam"	Eliminated
6	Lee	"Demi Waktu" (Ungu)	Safe	Christy	"Cinta Mati"	Safe
7	Ihsan	"Tak Bisakah" (Peterpan)	Safe	Sisi	"Tak Kuduga"	Safe
8	Nobo	"Mistikus Cinta" (Dewa)	Safe	Depe	"Kamu Harus Cepat Pulang" (Slank)	Safe
9	Kaleb	"Hebat" (Tangga)	Eliminated	Alice	"Arti Hadirmu"	Safe
10	Omar	"1000 Tahun Lamanya" (Jikustik)	Safe	Gea	"Berharap Tak Berpisah" (Reza)	Safe

=== Top 14 ===
Order	Males			Females		
Order	Contestant	Song (original artist)	Result	Contestant	Song (original artist)	Result
1	Tesa	"Permaisuriku" (Kahitna)	Eliminated	Christy	"Tua Tua Keladi" (Anggun)	Safe
2	Omar	"Rahasia Hati" (Element)	Eliminated	Alice	"Bukan Cinta Biasa" (Siti Nurhaliza)	Eliminated
3	Nobo	"Perbedaan" (Ari Lasso)	Safe	Gea	"Bilang Saja" (Agnes Monica)	Safe
4	Lee	"Misteri Ilahi" (Ari Lasso)	Safe	Depe	"Bahasa Kalbu" (Titi DJ)	Safe
5	Dirly	"Mendendam" (Marcell)	Safe	Maria	"Mengertilah Kasih" (Ruth Sahanaya)	Safe
6	Ihsan	"Ijinkan Aku Menyayangimu" (Iwan Fals)	Safe	Brinet	"Merenda Kasih" Ruth Sahanaya	Eliminated
7	Ilham	"Separuh Nafas" (Dewa)	Safe	Sisi	"Semua Jadi Satu" (3 Diva)	Safe

=== Wild Card Round ===
Order	Contestant	Song (original artist)	Result
1	Tesa	"Pergi Untuk Kembali"(Ello)	Safe
2	Kaleb	"Akhir Cerita Cinta" (Glenn Fredly)	Eliminated
3	Brinet	"Milikmu Selalu" (Andien)	Safe
4	Dian	"Pudar" (Rossa)	Eliminated

== Spectacular Show ==
=== Spectacular Show 1 – Platinum 12 ===
Order	Contestant	Song (original artist)	Result
1	Ihsan	"Manusia Biasa"(Radja)	Safe
2	Maria	"Logika" (Vina Panduwinata)	Safe
3	Dirly	"Bukan Untukku" (Rio Febrian)	Safe
4	Depe	"Rahasia Perempuan" (Ari Lasso)	Eliminated
5	Lee	"Cemburu" (Dewa)	Safe
6	Brinet	"Lagu Sendu" (Audy)	Safe
7	Sisi	"Salahkah Aku Terlalu Mencintaimu"(Ratu)	Safe
8	Ilham	"Pupus"(Dewa)	Safe
9	Christy	"Aku Baik-baik Saja"(Ratu)	Safe
10	Nobo	"Kasih Tak Sampai" (Padi)	Bottom 3
11	Gea	"Dia" (Reza)	Bottom 3
12	Tesa	"Kisah Romantis" (Glenn Fredly)	Safe

=== Spectacular Show 2 – Ayo Dansa ===
Order	Contestant	Song (original artist)	Result
1	Maria	"Warna"(Sheila Majid)	Safe
2	Ilham	"Sedang Ingin Bercinta" (Dewa)	Safe
3	Sisi	"Penasaran" (Emilia Contesa)	Bottom 3
4	Lee	"This Love"(Maroon 5)	Eliminated
5	Brinet	"Bawalah Daku" (Puput Melati)	Safe
6	Dirly	"Cintaku" (Chrisye)	Bottom 3
7	Gea	"Hanya Memuji"(Shanty feat. Marcell)	Safe
8	Tesa	"Maria Maria"(Santana)	Safe
9	Ihsan	"Pelangi"(Koes Plus)	Safe
10	Christy	"Bukan Milikmu Lagi" (Agnes Monica)	Safe
11	Nobo	"Pengalaman Pertama" (A Rafiq)	Safe

=== Spectacular Show 3 – Kreasi dan Ekspresi ===
Order	Contestant	Song (original artist)	Result
1	Nobo	"Juwita"(Yovie & The Nuno)	Safe
2	Sisi	"Yang Kumau" (Krisdayanti)	Bottom 3
3	Dirly	"Setia" (Jikustik)	Safe
4	Brinet	"Ku Bahagia" (Melly Goeslaw)	Safe
5	Ilham	"Aku Ingin" (Indra Lesmana)	Safe
6	Maria	"Selamat Jalan Kekasih" (Bebi Romeo)	Safe
7	Tesa	"Kasih Putih"(Glenn Fredly)	Eliminated
8	Christy	"Indah"(Agnes Monica)	Bottom 3
9	Ihsan	"Bunga Terakhir"(Bebi Romeo)	Safe
10	Gea	"Mak Comblang" (Potret)	Safe

=== Spectacular Show 4 – Colourful Love ===
Order	Contestant	Song (original artist)	Result
1	Gea	"Takkan Terganti"(Dea Mirella)	Safe
2	Maria	"When You Tell Me That You Love Me" (Diana Ross)	Safe
3	Ihsan	"JAP" (Sheila On 7)	Safe
4	Brinet	"Satu Jam Saja" (Audy)	Eliminated
5	Dirly	"Arti Cinta" (Ari Lasso)	Safe
6	Christy	"Kenangan Terindah" (Samsons)	Safe
7	Ilham	"Aku Cinta Kau Dan Dia"(Bebi Romeo)	Bottom 3
8	Nobo	"Arjuna Mencari Cinta"(Dewa)	Safe
9	Sisi	"I Will Always Love You"(Whitney Houston)	Bottom 3

=== Spectacular Show 5 – Idol in Action ===
Order	Contestant	Song (original artist)	Result
1	Christy	"Bayang Semu"(Ungu)	Bottom 3
2	Ilham	"One Last Cry" (Brian McKnight)	Safe
3	Gea	"Lelaki Buaya Darat" (Ratu)	Safe
4	Ihsan	"Terbang" (Gigi)	Safe
5	Nobo	"I Want To Break Free" (Queen)	Safe
6	Maria	"Sang Dewi" (Titi DJ)	Safe
7	Dirly	"Dengan Nafasmu"(Samsons)	Bottom 3
8	Sisi	"Mahadaya Cinta"(Krisdayanti)	Eliminated

=== Spectacular Show 6 – Populer Lagi ===
Order	Contestant	Song (original artist)	Result
1	Ilham	"Lenggang Puspita"(Ahmad Albar)	Bottom 3
2	Gea	"Oh Ya" (K3S)	Safe
3	Nobo	"Arti Kehidupan" (Mus Mujiono)	Safe
4	Maria	"Burung Camar" (Vina Panduwinata)	Safe
5	Ihsan	"Jerat" (Harvey Malaiholo)	Bottom 3
6	Dirly	"Kisah Cintaku" (Chrisye)	Safe
7	Christy	"Masih Ada"(2D)	Eliminated

=== Spectacular Show 7 – Audisiku ===
Order	Contestant	Song (original artist)	Result
1	Nobo	"Sedih Tak Berujung"(Glenn Fredly)	Safe
2	Dirly	"Flying Without Wings" (Westlife)	Bottom 3
3	Ilham	"Kupu-kupu Malam" (Titiek Puspa)	Eliminated
4	Maria	"Stand Up For Love" (Destiny's Child)	Bottom 3
5	Ihsan	"Bento" (Iwan Fals)	Safe
6	Gea	"Di Dadaku Ada Kamu" (Vina Panduwinata)	Safe

=== Spectacular Show 8 – Rock ===
Order	Contestant	Song (original artist)	Result
1	Ihsan	"Sobat"(Padi)	Bottom 2
2	Maria	"Jangan Lagi Ada Angkara" (Nicky Astria)	Eliminated
3	Dirly	"I Miss You But I Hate You" (Slank)	Safe
4	Gea	"I Love Rock N Roll" (Britney Spears)	Safe
5	Nobo	"I Don't Want To Miss A Thing" (Aerosmith)	Safe

=== Spectacular Show 9 – Dua Warna ===
Order	Contestant	Song (original artist)	Result
1	Nobo	"Don't Sleep Away" (Daniel Sahuleka) "Jangan Buang Waktu" (Ruth Sahanaya)	Eliminated
2	Ihsan	"The Way You Look At Me"(Christian Bautista) "Pak Ketipak Tipung"(Rentak 106)	Bottom 2
3	Gea	"Because of You" (Keith Martin) "Pesta" (Elfa's Singers)	Safe
4	Dirly	"(Everything I Do) I Do It for You" (Bryan Adams) "Akhir Rasa Ini" (Samsons)	Safe

=== Spectacular Show 10 ===
Order	Contestant	Song (original artist)	Result
1	Dirly	"Topeng"(Peterpan) "Akhir Cerita Cinta" (Glenn Fredly)	Safe
2	Gea	"Jatuh Cinta" (Vina Panduwinata) "Biru" (2D)	Eliminated
3	Ihsan	"Laskar Cinta" (Dewa) "Untukku" (Chrisye)	Safe

=== Grand Final ===
Order	Contestant	Song (original artist)	Result
1	Ihsan	"Ijinkan Aku Menyanyangimu"(Iwan Fals) "Mahadewi" (Padi) "Kemenangan Hati" (Yovie Widianto)	Winner
2	Dirly	"Akhir Rasa Ini" (Samsons) "Hampa" (Ari Lasso) "Kemenangan Hati" (Yovie Widianto)	Runner-up

=== Guest performances ===
Week	Performer(s)
Spectacular 1	Samsons
Spectacular 2	Ratu
Spectacular 3	Melly Goeslaw; Rossa; Yovie Widianto
Spectacular 4	ADA Band
Spectacular 5	Armand Maulana; Shanty
Spectacular 6	Krisdayanti
Spectacular 7	Glenn Fredly
Spectacular 8	Seurieus Band
Spectacular 9	Radja
Spectacular 10	Dewa

== Elimination Chart ==
Females	Males	Top 28	Wild card	Top 12	Winner

Did not perform	Safe	Safe First	Safe last	Eliminated

Stage:		Semi-finals			Wild card	Finals										
Date:		5/5	12/5	19/5	26/5	2/6	9/6	16/6	23/6	30/6	7/7	14/7	21/7	28/7	4/8	19/8
Place	Contestant	Result														
1	Muhammad Ihsan Tarore			Top 12							Bottom 3		Bottom 2	Bottom 2		Winner
2	Dearly Dave Sompie			Top 12			Bottom 3			Bottom 3		Bottom 3				Runner-Up
3	Ghea Dahliana Oktarin			Top 12		Bottom 3									Elim	
4	Sanobo Koni Sasamu			Top 12		Bottom 3								Elim		
5	Maria Veronica Priscilla			Top 12								Bottom 3	Elim			
6	Ilham Irawan Basso			Top 12					Bottom 3		Bottom 3	Elim				
7	Christy Claudia Podung			Top 12				Bottom 3		Bottom 3	Elim					
8	Cecilia Dwi Hapsari			Top 12			Bottom 3	Bottom 3	Bottom 3	Elim						
9	Brinets Sudjana			Elim	Top 12				Elim							
10	Martesa Sumendra			Elim	Top 12			Elim								
11	Leelarat Justus Kulalean			Top 12			Elim									
12	Elisabeth Dwi Purna			Top 12		Elim										
13-14	Dian Kristanti		Elim		Elim											
13-14	Kaleb Yadija		Elim		Elim											
15-16	Alice Maussa			Elim												
15-16	Umar Rahman			Elim												
16-20	Diana Puspitasari		Elim													
16-20	Glenovian Armando Marcel		Elim													
16-20	Robin Tahalele		Elim													
16-20	Tiara Degrasia		Elim													
21-28	Ari Sanjaya	Elim														
21-28	Arief Wijaya	Elim														
21-28	Elies Januarita	Elim														
21-28	Ismawaty Kusumawardhany	Elim														
21-28	Lasma Flora Herawaty Sihombing	Elim														
21-28	Richard Knight	Elim														
21-28	Rivi Arisandi	Elim														
21-28	Tiara Soemawilaga	Elim														

Preceded by Indonesian Idol (season 2)	Indonesian Idol; 2006	Succeeded by Indonesian Idol (season 4)
