= Jakarta International Convention Center =

Convention center in Jakarta, Indonesia

Coordinates: 6°12′52″S 106°48′27″E

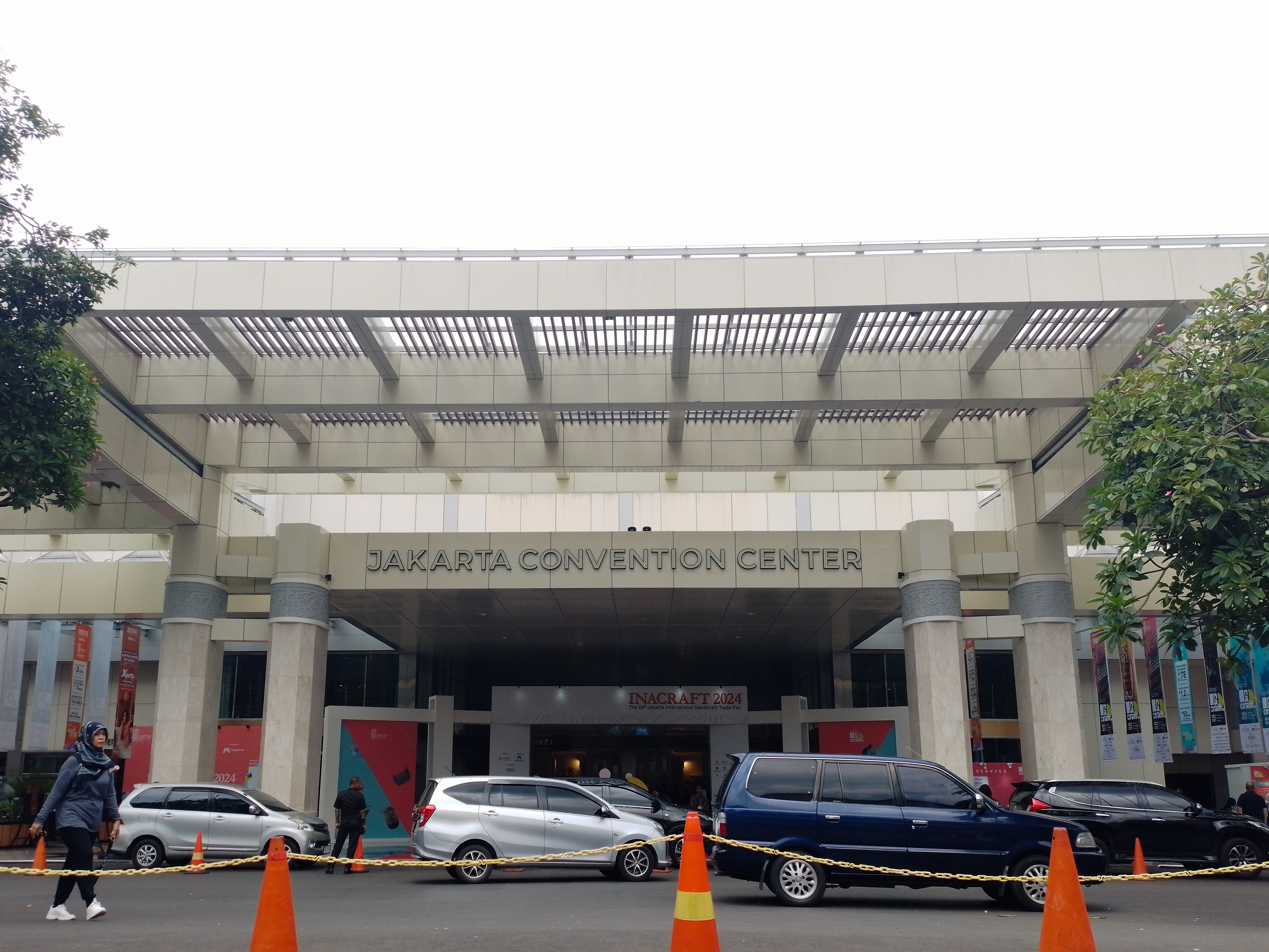
- Main entrance to the venue (c. 2024)
- Former names: Jakarta Convention Center (1974-92; 1995-2025); Jakarta Hilton Convention Center (1992-95)
- Address: Jl. Jend. Gatot Subroto; Jakarta 10270 Indonesia
- Location: Gelora
- Owner: Government of Indonesia (via the Ministry of State Secretariat)
- Public transit: Gerbang Pemuda

Construction
- Opened: 3 April 1974
- Renovated: 1992
- Construction cost: US$12.5 million
- Architect: Soejoedi Wirjoatmodjo (Plenary Hall)

Website
- Convention Center Website

Jakarta International Convention Center or JICC, formerly (but still colloquially) known as the Jakarta Convention Center or JCC, is a convention center located in Gelora Bung Karno Sports Complex, Jakarta, Indonesia. It is one of earliest as well as popular convention center in Jakarta. Since its inauguration in 1974, many important national and international conference, exhibition, fair, indoor sports and musical concerts were held at JICC, including the 10th Non-Aligned Movement Conference in 1992, the Asian-African Conference in 2005 and 2015, and the ASEAN Summit in 2011 and 2023.

== History ==
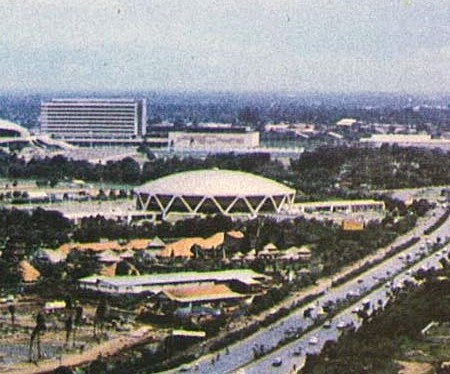
The original dome-shaped "plenary hall" building in 1976, prior to the construction of a larger building comprising new halls in late 1980s

The logo used from 1995 (?) until 2025

Construction of the Jakarta Convention Center complex started in 1960, as a part of Soekarno's ambition to showcase Jakarta's splendor as the capital of the new nation of Indonesia. It was expected to be completed before the Games of the New Emerging Forces in 1963, but never accomplished for the games. The convention center eventually completed in 1974, in time for the opening ceremony of the 23rd annual Pacific Asia Travel Association conference, held in early April 1974. The conference was a major event for Jakarta and several large hotel projects, such as Hotel Indonesia extension, Hotel Borobudur, Hotel Ambassador (now Hotel Aryaduta), and Hotel Sahid Jaya, were also targeted for completion before the PATA conference began. Originally, JCC was in a form of a single dome-shaped plenary hall (see image), designed by architect Soejoedi Wirjoatmodjo.

Between the late 1980s to the early 1990s, JCC received a major expansion for the 10th Non-Aligned Movement (NAM) Summit on 1-6 September 1992, which include a new large building conjoined with the existing plenary hall. The new building consists of two new large convention halls (Assembly and Cendrawasih) and two exhibition halls. The renovation was inaugurated by President Suharto 25 August 1992, just a week before NAM Summit. Because the building was under the same management with the Jakarta Hilton International Hotel (now Hotel Sultan) at the time, it was renamed to Jakarta Hilton Convention Center (JHCC). However, the name was reverted to Jakarta Convention Center again in 1995. From 1991 to 2024, the management was handled by PT. Graha Sidang Pratama (GSP) under a BOT contract for 30 years.

On 25 June 2023, JCC received a minor renovation for the 43rd ASEAN Summit on 5–7 September. It focused on interior refurbishments and the extension of the lobby area. The renovation took 105 days, and was finished on 25 August 2023.

On 24 January 2025, the Gelora Bung Karno Complex Management Center (Pusat Pengelolaan Kompleks Gelora Bung Karno, PPKGBK), which is controlled by the Ministry of State Secretariat, officially took over the operational of JCC and renamed it as Jakarta International Convention Center (JICC), as GSP's BOT contract had expired since 21 October 2024.

== Facilities ==
Jakarta International Convention Center has a dome-shaped plenary hall that has 5,000 seats, which is the original building from 1974. JICC also has an assembly hall with an area of 3,921 m², 13 various sized meeting rooms, and two exhibition halls (A and B) where each have an area of 3,060m² and 6,075m². It is also connected to The Sultan Hotel & Residence Jakarta (formerly Jakarta Hilton International) by a tunnel. The tunnel has moving walkways and is air-conditioned.

== Events ==
=== Sporting events ===
Between mid-2016 and September 2018, JICC was used as the venue of mixed martial arts event ONE Championship for six times. It also became a temporary venue at the 2017 Indonesia Open, because the Istora Gelora Bung Karno was under renovation for the 2018 Asian Games.

JICC was used as the location of the media center and International Broadcast Center for 2018 Asian Games. It was also a venue for few indoor matches, as well as Judo, Karate, Ju-jitsu, Kurash, Sambo, and Wrestling.

=== Entertainment events ===
| Date | Artist/Band | Event |
|---|---|---|
| 1 March 2017 | Bunga Citra Lestari | It's Me BCL |
| 24–26 October 2014 | | Java Soundsfair |
| 28 May−29, 2014 | Hatsune Miku | Hatsune Miku Expo |
| 3 May 2014 | Rajawali Televisi | Grand Launching Langit Rajawali |
| 3 April 2014 | Lionel Richie | All the Hits, All Night Long |
| 21 December 2013 | JKT48 | JKT48 2nd Anniversary Live In Concert; Performing All Out! Terima kasih telah menjadi temanku |
| 17 August 2013 | Pet Shop Boys | Electric Tour |
| 26 May 2013 | NET. | Grand Launching NET. |
| 10 March 2013 | Adam Lambert | We Are Glamily Tour |
| 5 April 2012 | Erwin Gutawa; Jay Subiyakto; Gigi; Once; Gita Gutawa; Sophia Latjuba; Vina Panduwinata | Chrisye 2012 Kidung Abadi |
| 31 January 2012 | Rod Stewart | |
| 11 January 2012 | Ungu; Wali; Afgan; Nidji; The Changcuters; Cherrybelle; Budi Doremi | Malam Puncak 17 Tahun Indosiar: Semarak 1 Tu7uan |
| 27 November 2011 | Anggun | Konser Kilau Anggun |
| 28 October 2011 | David Foster & Friends | The Hitman Returns |
| 15 September 2011 | Kahitna | Konser Cerita Cinta 25 Tahun |
| 24 August 2011 | Gita Gutawa; Wali; Afgan; Ungu | Malam Puncak HUT SCTV 21 Tahun: Harmoni Cinta Indonesia |
| 7 April 2011 | Kitaro | Kitaro World Tour |
| 26 February 2011 | Erwin Gutawa | A Masterpiece of Erwin Gutawa |
| 15 February 2011 | Sheila Majid | 25 Years of Radiance |
| 9 February 2011 | Janet Jackson | Number Ones: Up Close and Personal |
| 25 November 2010 | Ruth Sahanaya | 25th Anniversary Concert |
| 8 April 2009 | Jamiroquai | High Times Singles Tour |
| 10 March 2009 | Sarah Brightman | The Symphony World Tour |
| 6–8 March 2009 | | Jakarta International Java Jazz Festival |
| 25 November 2008 | Rossa | Konser Persembahan Cinta |
| 14 September 2008 | George Benson and Al Jarreau | Givin It Up Concert |
| 31 July 2008 | Alicia Keys | As I Am Tour |
| 17 May 2008 | Vina Panduwinata | Konser Vina |
| 14 May 2008 | Andi Rianto Orchestra (Magenta Orchestra) | Magenta Moviechestra |
| 8 April 2008 | Duran Duran | Red Carpet Massacre Tour |
| 7–9 March 2008 | | Jakarta International Java Jazz Festival |
| 25 February 2008 | Backstreet Boys | Unbreakable Tour |
| 14 February 2008 | tvOne | Grand Launching tvOne: Sejuta Pilihan Satu Kepastian |
| 31 January 2008 | My Chemical Romance | The Black Parade World Tour |
| 2–4 March 2007 | | Jakarta International Java Jazz Festival |
| 15 December 2006 | Trans TV and Trans7 | 5th Anniversary of Trans TV; Grand Re-launching Trans7 |
| 25 May 2006 | Anggun | Konser Untuk Negeri |
| 14 May 2006 | Toto | Falling in Between World Tour |
| 7–9 March 2006 | | Jakarta International Java Jazz Festival |
| 26 January 2006 | 3 Diva | |
| 30 September 2005 | Titi DJ | Sang Dewi Live in Concert |
| 24 March 2005 | Krisdayanti | KD 1530 |
| 3–5 March 2005 | | Jakarta International Java Jazz Festival |
| 28 March 2004 | Enrique Iglesias | Seven World Tour |
| 15 February 2004 | Mariah Carey | Charmbracelet World Tour: An Intimate Evening with Mariah Carey |
| 10 May 2003 | Spirit of the Dance | |
| 9 February 2003 | Ronan Keating | |
| 10 May 2002 | Diana Krall | Diana Krall: Live in Concert |
| 30 April 2002 | Deep Purple | Deep Purple World Tour |
| 20 March 2002 | Bond | |
| 20 September 2001 | Krisdayanti | Konser KD |
| 3 October 2001 | The Corrs | In Blue Tour |
| 1 November 1999 | Alanis Morissette | Junkie Tour |
| 24 November 1998 | Ricky Martin | Vuelve World Tour |
| 1 December 1996 | Alanis Morissette | Can't Not Tour |
| 13 May 1996 | Mr. Big | |
| 9 May 1996 | Santana | Dance of the Rainbow Serpent Tour |
| 6 February 1995 | Roxette | Crash! Boom! Bang! Tour |
| 10 April 1994 | Duran Duran | The Dilate Your Mind Tour |
| 5 February 1994 | Sting | Ten Summoner's Tales Tour |
| 8 May 1993 | Bobby Brown | Humpin' Around The World Tour |

=== Others ===
- 10th Non-Aligned Movement Summit, 1992
- ASEAN Summits:
  - Special ASEAN Leaders' Meeting on Aftermath of Earthquake and Tsunami, 6 January 2005, as a response to the 2004 Indian Ocean earthquake and tsunami
  - 18th ASEAN Summit, 2011
  - 43rd ASEAN Summit, 2023
- Asian–African Conference Commemorative Summits:
  - 2005 Asian–African Summit
  - 2015 Asian–African Summit
- 18th East Asia Summit, 2023
- Anime Festival Asia (2013, 2014, 2024, and 2025 editions)
- INACRAFT (Jakarta International Handicraft Trade Fair)
- Indonesia Comic Con (2015–2025)
- Puteri Indonesia

== Cited works ==
- Merrillees, Scott (2015). Jakarta: Portraits of a Capital 1950-1980. Jakarta: Equinox Publishing. ISBN 9786028397308.
