= JICC =

JICC may refer to:

- Jakarta International Convention Center, a convention center in Indonesia
- JICC Co., Ltd., a Japanese publisher of magazines (see Takarajimasha)
