= Indonesia International Book Fair =

- Genre: Book fair
- Frequency: Annually
- Locations: Jakarta, Indonesia
- Country: Indonesia
- Inaugurated: 1980
- Next event: September 4–8, 2019
- Website: https://www.indonesia-bookfair.com/

Indonesia International Book Fair (IIBF) is a book-publishing trade fair held annually in Jakarta, Indonesia. In addition to selling books, the fair acts as a gateway for publishers and writers to the international book market. It also holds seminars, discussions and book launches. IIBF promotes interactions between literacy activists, publishers, writers, librarians, artists, education practitioners, and other creative industries. The fair also arranges many events on literacy, education and culture. The fair is usually held in September at Jakarta Convention Center.

== History ==
The book fair is organized by the Indonesian Publishers Association (IKAPI) and was inaugurated as Indonesia Book Fair (IBF) in 1980. It was renamed Indonesia International Book Fair in 2014 in an effort to attract a global audience. Saudi Arabia was the first participant as a guest of honor country in 2014, followed by South Korea, Malaysia and China in 2015, 2016, and 2017 respectively.

The 2014 IIBF was held from November 1 to 9. International participants were from Saudi Arabia, Malaysia, South Korea, Singapore, China, Japan, Taiwan, Canada, Egypt and Pakistan.

The 2015 IIBF was held from September 2 to 6. International participants were from India, Germany, Malaysia, Singapore and the Netherlands.

The 2016 IIBF was held from September 28 to October 2. Other than Indonesia, 12 countries participated the fair.

The 37th edition of IIBF was held from September 6–10, 2017, at Jakarta Convention Center. The fair was participated in by 20 countries including the Philippines, Malaysia, Singapore, Thailand, Taiwan, China, South Korea, Japan, Germany, France, the Netherlands, Bosnia, India, Egypt and Saudi Arabia.

Sixty-two participants from Indonesia, and 34 from 17 overseas countries took part 38th edition of IIBF, held from September 12 to 16, 2018. The theme of the fair was "Creative Work Towards the Culture Literacy".

The 39th IIBF was held from September 4 to 8, 2019 at JCC and participated in by 25 countries.
