= Mike Mohede =

- Also known as: MIKE
- Born: Michael Prabawa Mohede; 7 November 1983; Jakarta, Indonesia
- Died: 31 July 2016 (aged 32) South Tangerang, Banten, Indonesia
- Genres: Pop; gospel
- Occupation: Singer
- Instrument: Vocals
- Years active: 2005–2016
- Label: PRO M

Michael Prabawa Mohede (7 November 1983 – 31 July 2016) was an Indonesian singer and the winner of the second season of Indonesian Idol. He represented Indonesia in Asian Idol, losing to Hady Mirza of Singapore Idol.

== Indonesian Idol performances ==
- Top 24: Right Here Waiting by Richard Marx
- Top 12: Pupus by Dewa 19
- Top 11: Kamulah Satu-Satunya by Dewa 19
- Top 10: Bahasa Kalbu by Titi DJ
- Top 9: Sinaran by Sheila Majid
- Top 8: Mengejar Matahari by Ari Lasso
- Top 7: Nada Kasih by Fariz RM
- Top 6: Crazy Little Thing Called Love by Queen
- Top 5: Jadikanlah Aku Pacarmu by Sheila on 7
- Top 5: "Unchained Melody" by The Righteous Brothers
- Top 4: Enggak Ngerti by Kahitna
- Top 4: Roman Picisan by Dewa 19
- Top 3: Bunda by Melly Goeslaw
- Top 3: Because of You by Keith Martin
- Grand Final: Semua Untuk Cinta by Hendy Irvan
- Grand Final: Bahasa Kalbu by Titi DJ
- Grand Final: Ketika Kau Menyapa by Marcell Siahaan

== Discography ==
=== Studio albums ===
- 2005 Mike
- 2010 Kemenanganku
- 2011 Tak Seperti Dulu Single
- 2013 Mampu Tanpanya Single
- 2014 Kucinta Dirinya Single
- 2014 Tiada Kata (ft. Mulan Jameela) Single
- 2015 Kedua

=== Other works ===
- 2005 Seri Cinta (Indonesian Idol compilation)

== Death ==
He died at the age of 32 at RS Premier Bintaro (Bintaro Premier Hospital) in South Tangerang, Indonesia, on 31 July 2016, due to a heart attack.

Preceded by Joy Tobing	Indonesian Idol winner Mike Mohede (2005)	Succeeded by Ihsan Tarore
