= 10th Summit of the Non-Aligned Movement =

1992 Jakarta summit conference

- Host country: Indonesia
- Date: 1–6 September 1992
- Cities: Jakarta
- Venues: Jakarta Convention Center
- Chair: Suharto (President of Indonesia)
- Follows: 9th Summit of the Non-Aligned Movement (Belgrade, Yugoslavia)
- Precedes: 11th Summit of the Non-Aligned Movement (Cartagena Colombia)

10th Summit of the Non-Aligned Movement on 1–6 September 1992 in Jakarta, Indonesia was the conference of Heads of State or Government of the Non-Aligned Movement. Around 100 delegations, including some 60 heads of state or government, participated in the summit in Jakarta.

The end of the Cold War and the subsequent violent breakup of Yugoslavia, one of the founding and core members, seemed to bring into question the very existence of the movement, yet it was preserved during the times of crisis by the pragmatic chairmanship of Indonesia. The summit concluded that the NAM would create a special panel of economists and experts to investigate appropriate options for debt relief needed by many member states.

Brunei Darussalam joined the movement at the Jakarta Conference. Alongside Brunei, Myanmar (which left the NAM in 1979), the Philippines and Uzbekistan also joined the movement. Cambodia had returned, as the country was now governed by the United Nations Transitional Authority in Cambodia, while Argentina left the movement, bringing the list of members to 108 countries in total. Thailand as well as newly independent Armenia and Croatia were granted observer status for the first time (in total there was 8 observers), Bosnia and Herzegovina and Slovenia were granted guest status for the first time (in total there were 18 States and 13 organizations with that status). Requests by Kyrgyzstan and FYR Macedonia were referred for further consideration.

== Issues on the agenda ==
=== Yugoslav Crisis ===
At the time of the Breakup of Yugoslavia in the early 1990s, the Socialist Federal Republic of Yugoslavia was at the end of its 1989–1992 chairmanship of the movement and was about to transfer its chairmanship to Indonesia. The Yugoslav crisis created logistical and legal issues for the transfer to Indonesian chairmanship. At the time of the September 1–6, 1992 conference in Jakarta, the Yugoslav Wars had begun. Former Yugoslav republics of Croatia, Slovenia and Bosnia-Herzegovina joined the United Nations as new member states while the UN imposed sanctions against Yugoslavia. The new Federal Republic of Yugoslavia (consisting of Serbia and Montenegro) claimed to be the sole legal successor of Yugoslavia (which had been rejected in the United Nations Security Council Resolution 777 a couple of days following the conference). The Non-Aligned Movement was unable to influence developments in Yugoslavia in any significant way and was mostly responding to them.

The Yugoslav Crisis created an unprecedented situation in which the chairperson of the movement (Dobrica Ćosić who was in London at the time) was absent from the conference to transfer the chairmanship to Indonesia. The Yugoslav delegation, without any clear instructions from Belgrade, was led by Montenegrin diplomat Branko Lukovac. The delegation agreed that the new post-Yugoslav states could participate in the meeting with the status of observers despite the fact that Belgrade did not recognize them at the time. In the partially chaotic circumstances, the Yugoslav delegation (de facto Serbian and Montenegrin delegation) managed to achieve results which the Minister of Foreign Affairs of Egypt, Amr Moussa, described as good for Yugoslavia and better than what should be expected from the United Nations. The movement decided not to expel Yugoslavia. Instead, it retained the Yugoslav nametag and the empty chair, which was kept until the beginning of the 21st century when, after the overthrow of Slobodan Milošević, the Federal Republic of Yugoslavia dropped its claim on sole successor of Yugoslavia. The Federal Republic of Yugoslavia was not invited to conferences unless Yugoslav issues were discussed.

== Participants ==
The following states participated at the summit in Jakarta:

=== Member states ===
- Afghanistan
- Algeria
- Angola
- Bahamas
- Bahrain
- Bangladesh
- Barbados
- Belize
- Benin
- Bhutan
- Bolivia
- Botswana
- Brunei Darussalam
- Burkina Faso
- Burundi
- Cambodia
- Cameroon
- Cape Verde
- Central African Republic
- Chad
- Chile
- Colombia
- Comoros
- Congo
- Cuba
- Cyprus
- Djibouti
- Ecuador
- Egypt
- Equatorial Guinea
- Ethiopia
- Gabon
- Gambia
- Ghana
- Grenada
- Guatemala
- Guinea
- Guinea-Bissau
- Guyana
- India
- Indonesia
- Iran
- Iraq
- Ivory Coast
- Jamaica
- Jordan
- Kenya
- Kuwait
- Laos
- Lebanon
- Lesotho
- Liberia
- Libya
- Madagascar
- Malawi
- Malaysia
- Maldives
- Mali
- Malta
- Mauritania
- Mauritius
- Mongolia
- Morocco
- Mozambique
- Myanmar
- Nepal
- Nicaragua
- Niger
- Nigeria
- North Korea
- Oman
- Pakistan
- Palestine
- Panama
- Papua New Guinea
- Peru
- Philippines
- Qatar
- Rwanda
- São Tomé and Príncipe
- Saudi Arabia
- Senegal
- Seychelles
- Sierra Leone
- Singapore
- Somalia
- Sri Lanka
- Sudan
- Suriname
- Swaziland
- Syria
- Tanzania
- Togo
- Trinidad and Tobago
- Tunisia
- Uganda
- United Arab Emirates
- Uzbekistan
- Vanuatu
- Venezuela
- Vietnam
- Yemen
- Yugoslavia, Federal Republic of
- Zaire
- Zambia
- Zimbabwe

== See also ==
- Foreign relations of Indonesia
- Bandung Conference
- Indonesia and the United Nations
