= Yuni Shara =

Indonesian singer (born 1972)

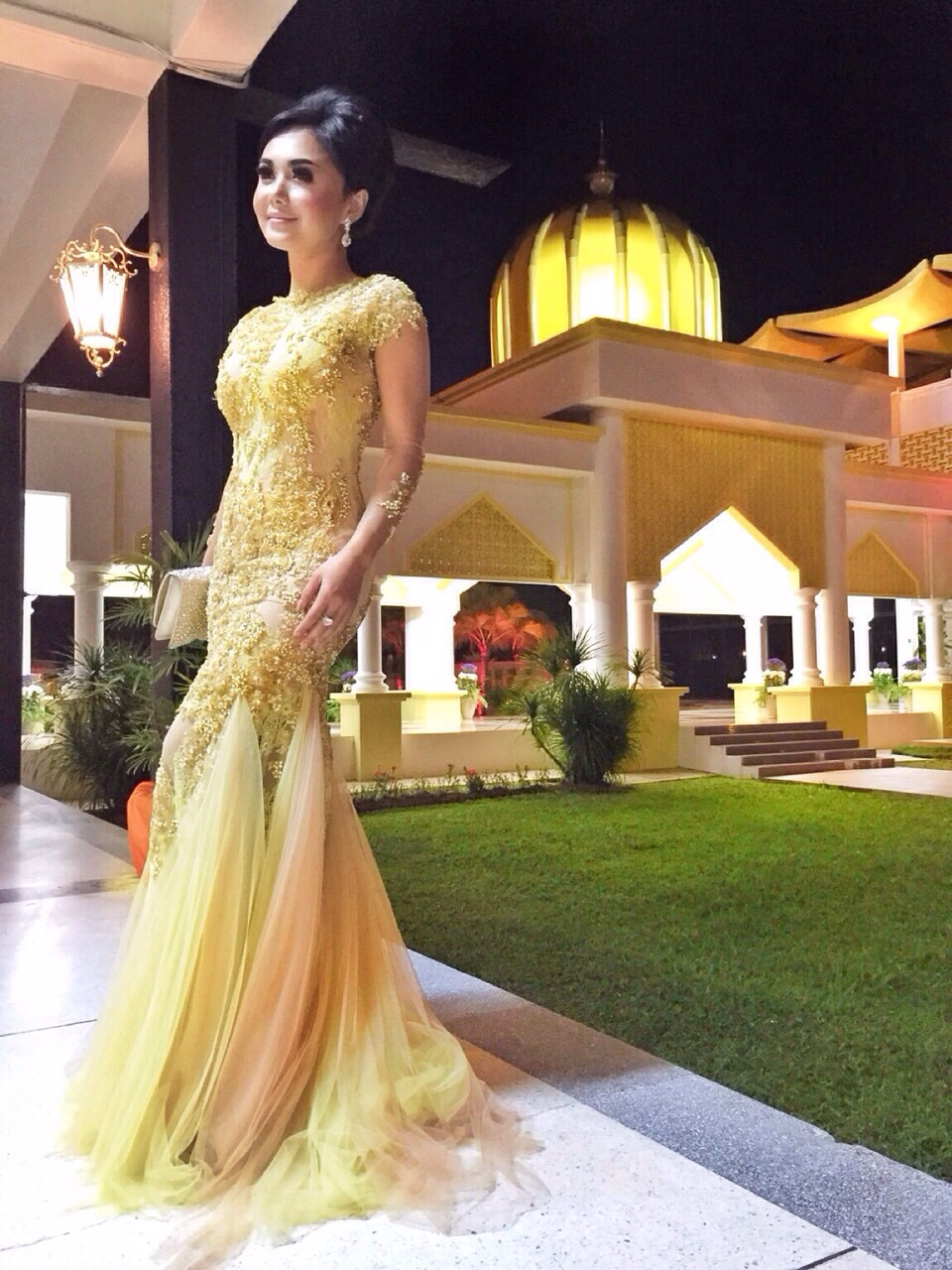
- Born: Wahyu Setyaning Budi; 3 June 1972 (age 54); Batu, East Java, Indonesia
- Other name: Yuni Shara
- Occupations: Singer, actress
- Years active: 1990–present
- Spouse(s): Raymond Manthey (divorced); Henry Siahaan (divorced)
- Children: Cavin Obient Salomo Siahaan; Cello Obient Siahaan
- Parent(s): Trenggono; Rachma Widianingsih
- Musical career
- Genre: Pop
- Labels: GP Records; Warner Music Indonesia

Yuni Shara is an Indonesian singer and actress. She is the elder sister of singer Krisdayanti. She was born as Wahyu Setyaning Budi in Batu, East Java on 3 June 1972. Her debut was in a music festival called Festival Bintang Radio & Televisi in 1987 when she was 15 years old and won 2nd place. In 1989, she participated in the same festival, and eventually she won first place. This is where she was offered a record deal by Billboard. She released her first record in 1990, titled Jatuh Cinta Lagi. In 1991, she released another record, titled Hilang Permataku, while in 1992 she released Salah Tingkah. Her career peaked with the release of the record Mengapa Tiada Maaf in 1995. The record was sold as many as 1.5 million copies, thus BASF awarded her with 4 Platinum Records. She also received 3 more Platinum Records for the Indonesian version of the soundtrack of the martial arts TV series Return of the Condor Heroes.

Her choice of songs is mainly popular old melancholic songs, one of which is the Keroncong style. However, her career came to a halt due to a surge in new pop groups that appealed more to a young audience.

Her ex-partner is the actor, Raffi Ahmad, with whom she released a duet Cinta Ini in 2011.
