= Jamrud (band) =

Indonesian metal band

- Also known as: Jam Rock
- Origin: Cimahi, West Java, Indonesia
- Genres: Hard rock; heavy metal; pop metal; pop rock; alternative metal; alternative rock
- Years active: 1984–present
- Label: Logiss Records
- Members: Aziz Mangasi Siagian; Ricky Teddy; Krisyanto; Mochamad Irwan; Danny Rachman
- Past members: Ari; Yudi; Budhy Haryono; Robby; Fitrah Alamsyah; Agus Aziz; Oppi; Untung; Sandy Handoko; Suherman Husin; Iwan Vox; Jaja Amdonal

Jamrud are an Indonesian rock & heavy metal band from Cimahi, West Java, Indonesia. They are notable as one of the most successful rock bands which known to bring rock music as popular music in Indonesia in the 1990s. Their fourth studio album, Ningrat (2000), has sold 2 million copies in Indonesia only, this making it the #7 highest selling album in Indonesia as well as the fourth best selling rock album in Indonesia.

Between 1981 and 1984, lead guitarist Azis Mangasi Siagian, bassist Ricky Teddy, keyboardist Ari Suwignyo, drummer Budhy Haryono, twin vocalist Robby Matulessy and Guntur Simbolon, and rhythm guitarist Arnold "Yudi" Suryadinata formed a band called Jam. In January 1984, Guntur decided to leave Jam. Due to the individual members' busy schedules, the band went on hiatus for several months. Still in January 1984, Azis (lead guitar), Ricky (bass), Ari (keyboards), Budhy Haryono (drums), Robby (vocals), and Yudi (rhythm guitar) reactivated the band. Not long after, Azis met music producer Log Zhelebour. Log agreed to manage them on the condition that the name "Jam" be changed, as it was considered too Western-sounding. Log then proposed the name "Jam Rock," since January 19, 1984, reasoning that "rock" (the stone) symbolized hardness. Furthermore, naming bands or vocal groups after types of stone was a popular trend at the time. Azis and the other members agreed to the proposal. However, feeling that the phase of performing Western songs had dragged on for too long, Budhy Haryono and Robby Matulessy chose to resign in 1985. Budhy subsequently formed the band Krakatau, while Robby joined the band Elpamas. Between 1985 and 1995, there were several personnel changes in the band. After vocalist Krisyanto, guitarist Fitrah Alamsyah and drummer Sandy Handoko joined the band, they performed in several rock festivals in Bandung started gaining fame in Indonesian music society. In 1996, they met their future record producer, Log Zhelebour, who offered them contract for recording music album. Then, the band changed their name to Jamrud and released their debut album, Nekad, in 1996. Throughout their career, most of Jamrud's studio albums have been certified platinum in Indonesia. The band have also won several awards from the Anugerah Musik Indonesia (Indonesian Music Awards).

As of 2010, Jamrud have sold more than 5 million albums in Indonesia.

== Background ==
Before becoming Jamrud, the initial original formation of Jamrock consisted of Azis MS (lead guitar), Ricky Teddy (bass), Ari (keyboards), Robby (vocals), Yudi (rhythm guitar) and Budhy Haryono (drums), the former GIGI drummer. In 1985, Robby and Budhy left the group and were replaced by Untung and Agus, and in 1986, Yudi also left the band to be replaced by Untung, who took on the role of rhythm guitarist while continuing as vocalis. Later in 1987, Oppi joined as lead vocalist and rhythm guitarist while Untung a took over as 2nd lead guitarist. Three years later, Ari and Untung decided to leave the band in 1990. In 1991, Krisyanto, Fitrah Alamsyah and Denny Barnas joined, Krisyanto and Denny entered to replacing Oppi and Agus Azis, later in 1994, Sandy Handoko joined replacing Denny. The Jamrock formation was finally formed which became popularly known by fans of the '90s, Azis (lead guitar), Ricky (bass), Krisyanto (vocals), Fitrah Alamsyah (guitar), and Sandy Handoko (drums).

=== From Jamrock to Jamrud ===
Jamrock are a music group that carries rock music that is respected around the Bandung area. At that time they mostly featured songs from other rock music groups that already had names. Their prestige increased when Krisyanto, Fitrah Alamsyah (guitar) and Sandhy Handoko (drums) joined Jamrock. Krisyanto himself won the title of Best Rock Vocalist in the festival rock Bandung.

Satisfied with carrying other people's songs, in 1995, Azis, Ricky, Krisyanto, Fitrah and Sandy began writing their own song material and recording their demos. They offered the demo to the Log Zhelebour record label (commonly called Log) which gave a warm welcome. Jamrock then got a contract for recording and joined Log's record label, Logiss Records. With their entry into Log's record label, Jamrock's name was changed to Jamrud. The reason the name Jamrock is changed to Jamrud because it avoids problems in the future and feels more pleasant to hear.

=== Success ===
Jamrud matured music and appearance under the care of the Log Zhelebour record label. The sale of Jamrud's first album, Nekad (1996), achieved sales of 150 thousand in a short time. Their success continued with their second album, Putri (1997), whose sales figure reached 300 thousand pieces. Big profits from the sale of Emerald albums continued until they released Terima Kasih (1998). The album was very popular among the young generation of Indonesia at that time, especially through the song "Berakit-rakit" and "Terima Kasih", so it sold up to touch the number 800 thousand pieces, a very remarkable achievement for the sale of rock music albums in Indonesia at that time, award as the Best AMI Award 1999 Rock Group.

The culmination of Jamrud's commercial success is the album Ningrat (2000) which recorded sales of two million pieces in Indonesia with the popularity of the singles "Surti-Tejo" and "Pelangi di Matamu" in Indonesia. Ningrat's album recorded history by winning 5 AMI Award 2000 awards for the rock group.

The success of Ningrat's album made Log Zhelebour bring Jamrud recordings at Studios 301 in Sydney, Australia and released the album Sydney 090102 (2002) The album sold over 1.4 million copies and included hits such as "Waktuku Mandi" and "Selamat Ulang Tahun." Following its success, Jamrud was awarded the Best Rock Album award at Anugerah Musik Indonesia 2002.

The success they have achieved cannot be separated from an unexpected event. In August 1999, Fitrah Alamsyah died of an overdose of illegal drugs followed by Sandy Handoko who died in October 2000. News of their deaths shocked the Indonesian music industry at that time. Sandy's position was later replaced by Suherman Husin. Fitrah was not replaced by anyone, to respect his dying wish, "If I die, you may not replace me (in one formation)". Therefore, during the time Suherman was the drummer, there was no replacement guitarist.

=== Setback ===
After Jamrud released seven albums, in 2007 Krisyanto departed from Jamrud on the grounds that he was bored and tired of his musical activities in the music group. Krisyanto then released his first solo album titled Mimpi (2009).

March 22, 2011, guitarist Azis MS revealed to Rolling Stone Indonesia that Krisyanto's departure was partly due to his despair because of the declining sales of Jamrud's album, not because of boredom. "If after leaving, he's not active in music anymore, as he said, it does mean that he wants to break in the music world. But if this, so many months immediately release an album, it means wanting to find more income. The band came out and he formed again, meaning there was dissatisfaction in the band before. That's all," Azis said.

"Even though at the time I was thinking, just wait. As for us too, the term, break it, rest for two to three years, because we also have tours every year to hundreds of cities. The term is also sharing rezekilah to other bands. "There's nothing wrong with that. While waiting, it won't even go hungry. It's just that maybe he thinks differently. So maybe he wants to gain more gold," Azis continued.

=== New Formation ===
After Krisyanto's departure, Jamrud immediately moved to recruit new personnel. Three new personnel were added to their band. They are Jaja Donald Amdonal (vocals) who replaced Krisyanto, Mochamad Irwan (rhythm guitar) and Danny Rachman (drums) who replaced Herman. With this formation Jamrud released a new album titled New Performance 2009 which was released at CiToS Jakarta on March 16, 2009. Jamrud plans to release a compilation album before the tour at the end of 2009.

=== New Concept of Jamrud Album ===
Jamrud are determined to change the image so that Jamers (Jamrud fan call) no longer compares the Krisyanto era with the current Jamrud era, the changes are very striking from the concept of music or song and the Jamrud logo is more metal.

The log gave the title Bumi & Langit album (old & new era album terms like earth and sky) plus Menangis because there must be some saddened, especially fanatical Jamrud lovers (Jamrud Kris era). Jamrud have changed as a whole with the risk of being abandoned by old Jamers or even gaining additional support for young Jamers and older ones because of changes in the concept of music.

=== The amount of sale of Jamrud albums are phenomenal among other rock groups. Jamrud has toured a large scale show in more than one hundred cities with 100-150 million contract value per show (only fee). But, current sentiments of the people are that they are already tired of seeing the performances of Jamrud because they have toured several shows since 1999 until 2006. ===
It was at that time that Jamrud's existence as the number one rock group was confirmed through his recordings which managed to overcome other similar products. Jamrud's albums such as Nekad (1996) sold 150,000 tapes and CDs, Putri (1997, 300,000 tapes / CDs), Terima Kasih (1999, 800,000 cassettes and CDs) and Ningrat (2000, sold 2,000,000 tapes and CDs) so that won the 5th award in the AMI Award 2001 even brought them along with Log Zhelebour, of course doing a single tour in 120 cities sponsored by Djarum, invited to perform in Japan and Korea and recording in Australia and presenting to Album Sydney 090102 (2002), selling 1,000,000 tapes /CD.

While Azis MS and Ricky Teddy still want to survive in Jamrud by recruiting young musicians like Danny on drums, Irwan on guitar, Donal on vocals and releasing an album adaptation of Jamrud New Performance and Best of the Best. Even to support the change in Jamrud's music which is more fierce and full of energy on his new album, Iwan Vox recruited as Donald's lead vocalist. In April 2011, Iwan left. Likewise with Donal who began to leave in March 2012 to join the band with the same community and make a new band which is certainly in Jakarta, as quoted detik.com, "I will still be in the same community. I will still be friends with them, I also plan to want to have a new band. We support each other."

=== Krisyanto Returns ===
In September 2011, Krisyanto stated that he officially returned to Jamrud starting in October 2011. Krisyanto's presence was marked by changes to their latest album entitled Bumi & Langit Menangis re-released with a new title Energi + Dari Bumi Dan Langit. In this album there is one additional song titled "Ciiaat". Some of the mainstay songs in this album are also re-made video clips such as "Shit", "Sik Sik Sibatumanikkam" and "Cerita Usang" In fact, in March 2012, Donald resigned from this band, to join a new band with the same community that was far more rocky than this band.

=== Saatnya Menang album ===
In December 2012, Jamrud with the formation of Krisyanto as the main vocalist released the album Saatnya Menang. And 11 songs on this album were made a video clip by Log Zhelebour, including songs predicted to be Hits "Ajari Aku", "Kau Jahanam, Aku Bajingan", "Genggam Tanganku" dan "Ingin Kembali". Jamrud will soon be releasing a Karaoke DVD in September 2013 which contains 15 video clips.

=== Toured with Skid Row ===
In October 2013, Jamrud will tour a show in 6 cities with the band Skid Row from the United States in Jakarta, Bandung, Semarang, Yogyakarta, Malang and Surabaya organized by Log Zhelebour Production who is also a producer and leader of Jamrud management.

== Band members ==
Current members

- Aziz Mangasi Siagian – lead guitar, backing vocals (1984–present); keyboards, piano (2000–present)
- Ricky Teddy – bass, backing vocals (1984–present)
- Krisyanto – lead vocals (1991–2007, 2011–present)
- Mochamad Irwan – rhythm guitar, backing vocals (2008–present)
- Danny Rachman – drums (2008–present)

Former members

- Ari – keyboards (1984–1990)
- Yudi – rhythm guitar (1984–1986)
- Budhy Haryono – drums (1984–1985)
- Robby – lead vocals (1984–1985)
- Agus Aziz – drums (1985–1991)
- Untung – vocals (1985–1987); rhythm guitar (1986–1987); lead guitar (1987–1990)
- Oppi – vocals (1987–1991)
- Fitrah Alamsyah – rhythm guitar (1991–1999; died 1999)
- Denny Barnas – drums (1991–1994)
- Sandy Handoko – drums (1994–2000; died 2000)
- Suherman Husin – drums, backing vocals (2000–2008)
- Iwan Vox – vocals (2011)
- Jaja Amdonal – lead vocals (2008–2011)

Timeline

== Discography ==
Studio albums

- Nekad (1996)
- Putri (1997)
- Terima Kasih (1998)
- Ningrat (2000)
- Sydney 090102 (2002)
- BO 18+ (2004)
- All Access In Love (2006)
- New Performance (2009)
- Bumi & Langit Menangis (2011)
- Energi + Bumi & Langit (2012)
- Saatnya Menang (2013)
- Akustikan (2015)
- God Gave Rock N' Roll to Me (2021)

Compilation albums

- The Best Collection (1999)
- All The Best: Slow Hits (2003)
- Best Of The Best (2010)
- 20 Years Greatest Hits (2016)
