= Vina Panduwinata =

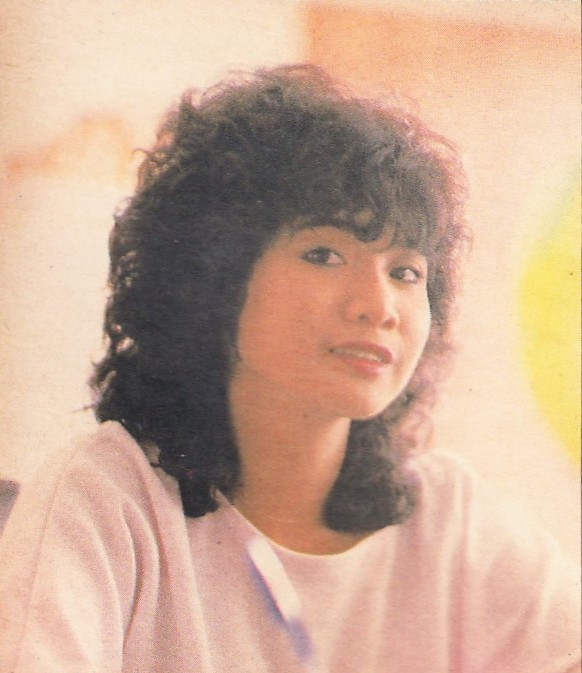

Background information
- Born: Vina Dewi Sastaviyana; 6 August 1959 (age 67); Bogor, West Java, Indonesia
- Origin: Indonesia
- Genres: Pop, jazz, soul, R&B, jazz pop, pop kreatif, smooth jazz, quiet storm
- Occupations: Singer; actress
- Instrument: Vocals
- Years active: 1978–present
- Labels: Jackson Records (1980–1987); Harpa Records (1987–1991); HP Records; Musica Studios

Vina Dewi Sastaviyana (née Panduwinata) is an Indonesian singer and actress. The song "Kumpul Bocah" is cited as her signature song. Her song "Burung Camar" was listed by Rolling Stone Indonesia as the 28th-best Indonesian song of all time.

== Biography ==
Panduwinata was born in Bogor, West Java, on 6 August 1959 to Raden Panduwinata and Albertine Supit (Hajjah Tin Panduwinata, 13 June 1928 – 25 May 2022). She was the eighth of ten children. Her father was a diplomat who was first stationed in India, but later went to West Germany from 1975 to 1979. While in Germany, she recorded an album for RCA Records entitled Java, which included four tracks; it was released in 1978 Single Bar (1978) and Sorry Sorry & Touch Me (1979).

After returning to Indonesia from Germany in September 1981, Panduwinata made her debut Indonesian album, Citra Biru (Blue Image), with the title track released three months earlier. The album was produced by Addie MS and featured songs written by numerous songwriters, including James F. Sundah and Dodo Zakaria; it was released on Jackson Records and Tapes. This was followed by Citra Pesona (Enchanting Image) in September 1982. In 1982 Panduwinata went to Thailand to perform at the Bangkok International Film Festival together with Roy Marten, Melky Goeslaw, and Dewi Yull.

In February 1983, Panduwinata was invited by Chrisye to perform "Kisah Insani" ("Humans' Tale"), a duet on Chrisye's album Sendiri (Alone). In Chrisye's biography, Panduwinata said that she was surprised and shocked by the invitation. The following year, she released her third studio album, Citra Ceria (Bright Image), which included the single "Di Dadaku Ada Kamu" ("In My Chest There is You").

Two years later, Panduwinata sang "Burung Camar" ("Seagull") at the 1985 Indonesian Pop Song Festival; she went on to sing it at the World Popular Song Festival in Japan. Panduwinata released several further albums, including Cinta (Love; 1985), Cium Pipiku (Kiss My Cheek; 1987), Wow! (1989), and Rasa Sayang Itu Ada (That Loving Feeling is There; 1992).

On 8 November 2001, Panduwinata performed at the Divas of Southeast Asia concert held in Gelora Bung Karno Stadium in Jakarta together with Indonesian singers Krisdayanti and Titi DJ, Filipino singer Kuh Ledesma, and Malaysian singers Siti Nurhaliza, Fauziah Latiff, and Sheila Majid. Attended by 2,000 people, the concert saw Panduwinata perform a medley of four of her songs as well as a duet with Majid.

On 18 February 2006, Panduwinata held a solo concert, Viva Vina, at the Plenary Hall of the Jakarta Convention Centre. At the concert, attended by 3,000 people, she performed a set of 23 songs beginning with "Aku Makin Cinta". Wearing three costumes during the concert, beginning with a modified kebaya and ending with an Anne Avantie design, Panduwinata received a standing ovation at the end.

Three years later, Panduwinata held the Fantastic Gold Vina Panduwinata to celebrate her birthday. She also donated the dress that she had worn in the Viva Vina concert to the Hard Rock Cafe Jakarta. In 2010, she released a collaborative album, entitled Kekuatan Cinta (The Power of Love), which dealt with themes of life, religion, and love.

== Influences ==
Panduwinata was influenced by the vocal stylings of Dionne Warwick, Samantha Sang, Barbra Streisand, and Karen Carpenter. She further influenced other Indonesian and Malaysian singers, including Sheila Majid.

== Awards and accolades ==
"Burung Camar", sung by Panduwinata, won the 1985 Indonesian Pop Song Festival. It went on to win the Kawakami Award at the 1985 World Popular Song Festival, outperforming entries from other finalists such as La Toya Jackson and David Pomeranz, with the awards ceremony held at Nippon Budokan in Tokyo, Japan, on 27 October.

In its December 2009 issue, Rolling Stone Indonesia listed two of Panduwinata's songs as being among the 150 best Indonesian songs of all time. "Burung Camar" from the Indonesian Pop Song Festival's album was ranked 28th, while "Kumpul Bocah" from Cinta was ranked 67th.

== Personal life ==
Vina Panduwinata married Boy Haryanto Joedo Soembono on 26 November 1989. They have a son, Joedo Harvianto Kartiko. Vina's nephews, Shaka Tamaputra Panduwinata and Miguel Gyasi Panduwinata, who held Dutch passport, have become victims of Malaysia Airlines Flight 17 in Eastern Ukraine.

== Discography ==
=== Albums ===
- Citra Biru (Blue Image; 1981)
- Citra Pesona (Enchanting Image; 1982)
- Citra Ceria (Bright Image; 1984)
- Cinta (Love; 1986)
- Cium Pipiku (Kiss My Cheek; 1987)
- Surat Cinta (Love Letter; 1988)
- Nurlela (1989, with Rumpies)
- Wow! (1989)
- Rasa Sayang Itu Ada (This Loving Feeling is There; 1991)
- Aku Makin Cinta (I Fall Further in Love; with Lydia Nursaid & Mus Mujiono) (1996)
- Vina 2000 (2000)
- Bawa Daku (Take Me; 2001)
- Vina for Children (2002)
- Vina Terbaik 1981-2006 (Vina's Greatest 1981-2006; 2006)
- Kekuatan Cinta (The Power of Love; 2010)
