= Monita Tahalea =

Indonesian pop, folk and jazz singer

- Also known as: Monita Tahalea
- Born: Indonesia
- Genres: Pop, Jazz, Folk
- Occupations: Singer, Songwriter
- Years active: 2005–present
- Label: Independent

Monita Angelica Maharani Tahalea (born July 21, 1987) is an Indonesian pop, folk and jazz singer. She is known for finishing fourth on Indonesian Idol season 2. She is a singer & songwriter.

== Career ==
Monita was born in Jakarta. She began her singing career after finishing in fourth place on Indonesian Idol, season 2. Later on, an Indonesian Idol judge, Indra Lesmana took interest in producing her first album titled "Dream, Hope and Faith" in 2010. In August 2013 she released an EP "Songs of Praise" with her band The Nightingales.

In December 2015, Monita released her second album titled "Dandelion" that she produced together with Gerald Situmorang. And in March 2020 she released her third album "Dari Balik Jendela" produced by Indra Perkasa. Monita Tahalea received The 43rd JGTC Artist Choice of The Year 2020. Through this album, Monita Tahalea was included in two nominations at Anugerah Musik Indonesia 2020, best alternative singer and best album cover. Dari Balik Jendela was named the best album cover at AMI 2020.

June 2025, Tahalea released her fifth studio album, Merona, marking her first full-length studio album since Dari Balik Jendela (2020). The album explored themes of personal growth, gratitude, and reflection through a blend of pop, jazz, folk, soul, and electronic influences.

Also in June 2025, she collaborated with Kahitna on the single “Titik Nadir”, written by Yovie Widianto and Arsy Widianto.

In 2025, Tahalea made her feature film acting debut in Garin Nugroho’s musical drama Siapa Dia, portraying the character Nurlela alongside Nicholas Saputra, Amanda Rawles, Ariel Tatum, Happy Salma, and Dira Sugandi, Widi Mulia.

In November 2025, she released the worship single “Damai”.

In December 2025, Tahalea appeared as a featured vocalist on St. Loco’s single “Juru Selamat”.

== Discography ==
Solo Album

- Dream, Hope and Faith (2010)
- Songs of Praise (2013)
- Dandelion (2016)
- Dari Balik Jendela (2020)
- Merona (2025)

Compilation Album

- Seri Cinta: KELIRU (2005)
- SATU KATA Andre Hehanusa, Monita Tahalea (2005)
- Kemenangan Hati: KEKASIH SEJATI, SELINGKUH Yovie Widianto, Monita Tahalea (2007)
- Kembali Satu (2008)
- Kompilasi Kembali Satu: DIBATAS MIMPI (2008)
- Halo Aci: Indonesia Pusaka (2011)
- Tropicana Slim: Remember My Sweet Moments (2012)
- An Urban Christmas: Gita Sorga Bergema Barry Likumahuw, Monita Tahalea (2011)
- SILENT NIGHT: Indra Lesmana, Dewa Budjana, Monita Tahalea (2013)
- OST. Adriana: LEPAS Indra Lesmana, Monita Tahalea (2013)
- OST. Adriana: MAYBE (2013)
- Gift of Light: Barry Likumahuwa, Monita Tahalea (2015)
- OST. Filosofi Kopi: FILOSOFI & LOGIKA Glenn Fredly, Monita Tahalea, Is (2015)
- Nivea: I Love Mama (2015)
- Album Aransemen Ulang Film Tiga Dara: CITA-CITA (2016)
- Like Father Like Son: WISH MY BABY Benny Likumahuwa, Monita Tahalea (2017)
- BUKALAH HATI Igor Saykoji, Gabriela Cristy, Monita Tahalea (2017)
- SAMPAI USAI WAKTU Sandhy Sondoro, Monita Tahalea (2018)
- HADIRMU Bayu Risa ft. Monita Tahalea (2018)
- SESAAT YANG ABADI, OST. Mantan Manten (2018)
- Album Detik Waktu Candra Darusman: PERKENALAN PERDANA (2018)
- BICARA The Overtunes ft. Monita Tahalea (2018)
- RAINING FLOWERS Gerald Situmorang, Monita Tahalea, Sri Hanuraga (2019)
- DULU Bunglon, Monita Tahalea (2019)
- MALAM TANPA MIMPI Monita Tahalea, Sri Hanuraga (2019)
- OST. Aruna & Lidahnya: ANTARA KITA (2019)
- Hymns With Gratitude: Albert Fakdawer, Monita Tahalea (2020)
- TAPAK HENING (2020)
- LAILA (2021)
- SAYONARA (2021)
- KITA BERANGKAT SAJA DULU Ananda Badudu ft. Monita Tahalea (2021)
- APA MIMPIMU? Ananda Badudu ft. Monita Tahalea (2021)
- Labuan Hati Monita Tahalea ft. Teddy Adhitya (2023)
- Titik Nadir Kahitna Badudu ft. Monita Tahalea (2025)
- Damai Monita Tahalea, Andy Ambarita, Andre Hermanto (2025)
- Juru Selamat St. Loco ft. Monita Tahalea (2025)
