= Ruth Sahanaya =

Indonesian singer

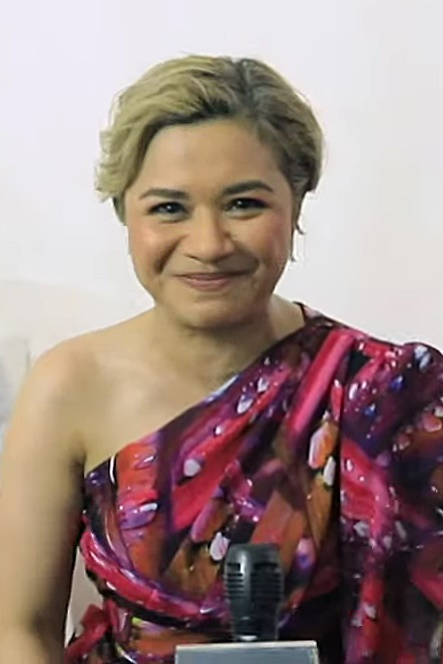
- Sahanaya in 2019

Background information
- Also known as: Uthe
- Born: Bandung, West Java, Indonesia
- Genres: Pop, Pop kreatif, R&B, soul, classic
- Occupations: Singer
- Years active: 1987–present
- Labels: Music Factory Indonesia (2012–present); Nagaswara (2010–2012); Sony Music Entertainment Indonesia (2002–2010); Aquarius Musikindo (1987–2002)
- Members: Truth, 3 Diva & True Worshippers

Ruth Sahanaya, affectionately nicknamed Uthe, is an Indonesian pop singer. She rose to fame in the late 1980s and is perhaps best known for her 1991 hit song "Kaulah Segalanya". She has toured internationally, been the Indonesian representative at many music festivals, and has received multiple awards. Having previously recorded under the Indonesian label PT Aquarius Musikindo, she signed with Sony Music in the early 2000s (decade). She is currently one of the three members of a vocal group along with Titi DJ and Krisdayanti called 3 Diva. She is one of the many Christian Indonesian singers who are a part of the Christian gospel band True Worshippers.

Her 1999 album, Kasih, has sold more than 250,000 copies in Indonesia.

She is married to Jeffry Waworuntu, who is also her manager. She has two daughters.

== Discography ==
- Seputih Kasih (1987)
- Tak Kuduga (1989)
- Kaulah Segalanya (1991)
- Yang Terbaik (1995)
- ...Uthe (1996)
- Berserah Kepada Yesus (Gospel Album) (1998)
- Kasih (1999)
- Yang Kurindukan (Gospel) (2000)
- Greatest Hits Ruth Sahanaya (2002)
- Bicara Cinta (2003)
- Jiwaku (2006)
- Joyful Christmas (2007)
- Giving My Best (Gospel) (2009)
- Thankful (2010)
