= Padi (band) =

Indonesian rock band

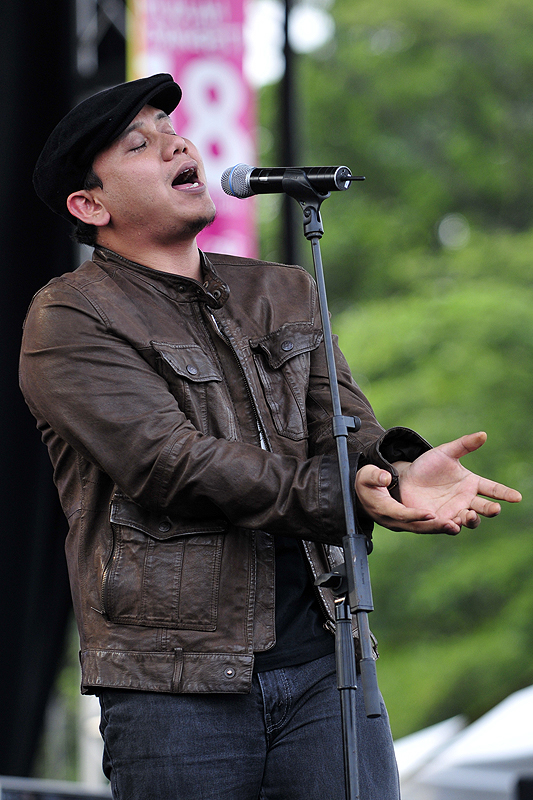
- Padi's vocalist, Fadly during Pesta Malam Indonesia 3 Concert in 2009.

Background information
- Origin: Surabaya, Indonesia
- Genres: Alternative rock, pop rock, psychedelic rock, Indonesian rock
- Years active: 1997–2011; 2017–present
- Labels: Sony; Aquarius
- Members: Andi Fadly Arifuddin; Satrio Yudi Wahono (Piyu); Rindra Risyanto Noor; Ari Tri Sosianto; Surendro Prasetyo (Yoyo)

Padi (Indonesian for Oryza sativa) is an Indonesian rock band. It is formed in 1996 with its early name, Soda. When the band formed on April 8, 1997, through the renaming from Soda to Padi, all of its members were still studying at Airlangga University, Surabaya, Indonesia. The band consists of Satrio Yudi Wahono, better known as "Piyu" (lead guitar, backing vocals), Andi Fadly Arifuddin (lead vocals), Ari Tri Sosianto (guitar, backing vocals), Rindra Risyanto Noor (bass), and Surendro Prasetyo, better known as "Yoyo" (drums).

Their second album, Sesuatu Yang Tertunda (2001), recorded one of the highest domestic sales of music records in Indonesia by selling approximately 2 million copies, with 450,000 copies of which sold in just 2 weeks. Padi has sold approximately 4 million albums in Indonesia only, as of 2012.

In late 2007, Rolling Stone Indonesia magazine placed 2 of their albums on their "150 Greatest Indonesian Albums of All Time" list. Those are Sesuatu Yang Tertunda at #55 and Save My Soul at #110. In addition, Rolling Stone also put two of Padi's songs on the "150 Greatest Indonesian Songs of All Time" list. The songs are "Mahadewi" (#87) and "Sobat" (#109), both came from the debut album Lain Dunia (1999), which was not included in the magazine's list of Best Albums.

== Formation and early years ==
Formed on April 8, 1997, this group is a place for the art creativity of five students at Airlangga University, Surabaya. It was originally called 'Soda', but was later changed to 'Padi'. This name was chosen because it is down to earth. Furthermore, they not only adopt their philosophy, they contain more and more ducking, but also see their function that symbolizes prosperity.

Starting from playing music from one small stage to another, the group was finally got signed by Sony Music.

== Lain Dunia ==
Their first album Lain Dunia was released in August 1999. Paddy appeared with complex songs marked by an arrangement of two guitars that were almost always different in each phrase in each song. This album managed to achieve success thanks to the support of several strong hits such as "Sudahlah", "Seperti Kekasihku", "Begitu Indah", and "Mahadewi", which made the album get platinum in April 2000 and quadruple platinum in 2001 with total the sales reached 800,000 copies. in late 2007, Rolling Stone Indonesia magazine placed two of Padi's songs on the "150 Greatest Indonesian Songs of All Time" list, the songs are "Mahadewi" (#87) and "Sobat" (#109).

== Sesuatu Yang Tertunda ==
Their second album, Sesuatu Yang Tertunda (2001), was released on July 2, 2001. With the released of several monster hits from the album which topped the national chart such as "Bayangkanlah", "Seandainya Bisa Memilih", "Sesuatu Yang Indah", "Kasih Tak Sampai", and "Semua Tak Sama", this album recorded one of the highest domestic sales of music records in Indonesia by selling approximately 2 million copies, with 450,000 copies of which sold in just 2 weeks. This album won four awards from the 2001 Anugerah Music Indonesia (AMI) awards including the best album. They also won the "best album" and the "best group" at the Malaysian Muzik Industry Award 2001. The biggest price was when they won Favorite Artist Indonesia at the 2002 MTV Asia Awards. This album was placed at #55 in Rolling Stone Indonesia magazine on their "150 Greatest Indonesian Albums of All Time" list.

== Save My Soul ==
Save My Soul is Padi's third studio album, was launched on June 18, 2003. This album was not as successful as the previous two albums due to the dark of its content and the heavy of music, departed from their previous released. Despite the low sales figures just 800.000 copies, this album gained recognition from Sobat Padi (fans of Padi) and many people voted the best album Padi had ever made. Rolling Stone Indonesia magazine ranked this album at #110 on their "150 Greatest Indonesian Albums of All Time" list. The album had won four award from the 2003 Anugerah Music Indonesia (AMI) awards including Best Song and Best Music Video for the song "Hitam", Best Producer Album and Best Album for its album Save My Soul. They are also won two award from the 2004 Anugerah Planet Muzik which is an annual award given to the most popular artists from Indonesia, Singapore, and Malaysia. Padi won the "Best Duo/Group" and "Best Album".The hits single from this album are "Hitam", "Rapuh", and "Patah".

== Tak Hanya Diam ==
Tak Hanya Diam is the fifth album of Padi which was released on Friday, November 16, 2007. The launch of this album is also quite unique. Padi launched their latest album by singing on the deck of the KRI Teluk Mandar 514 which sailed slowly in the waters of Jakarta Bay on Monday, November 12, 2007. In addition, Padi also introduced their new logo. The album produced hits single such as "Sang Penghibur" and "Harmony".

== Discography ==
=== Studio albums ===
Title	Album details	Sales
Lain Dunia	Released: 1999; Label: Sony	800,000+
Sesuatu yang Tertunda	Released: 2001; Label: Sony	2,000,000
Save My Soul	Released: 2003; Label: Sony	800,000+
Padi	Released: 2005; Label: Sony BMG	—N/a
Tak Hanya Diam	Released: 2007; Label: Sony BMG	—N/a
Indera Keenam	Released: 2019; Label: Sony	—N/a

=== Compilation ===
- The Singles (2011)
