= Titi DJ =

Indonesian singer, actress and beauty pageant titleholder

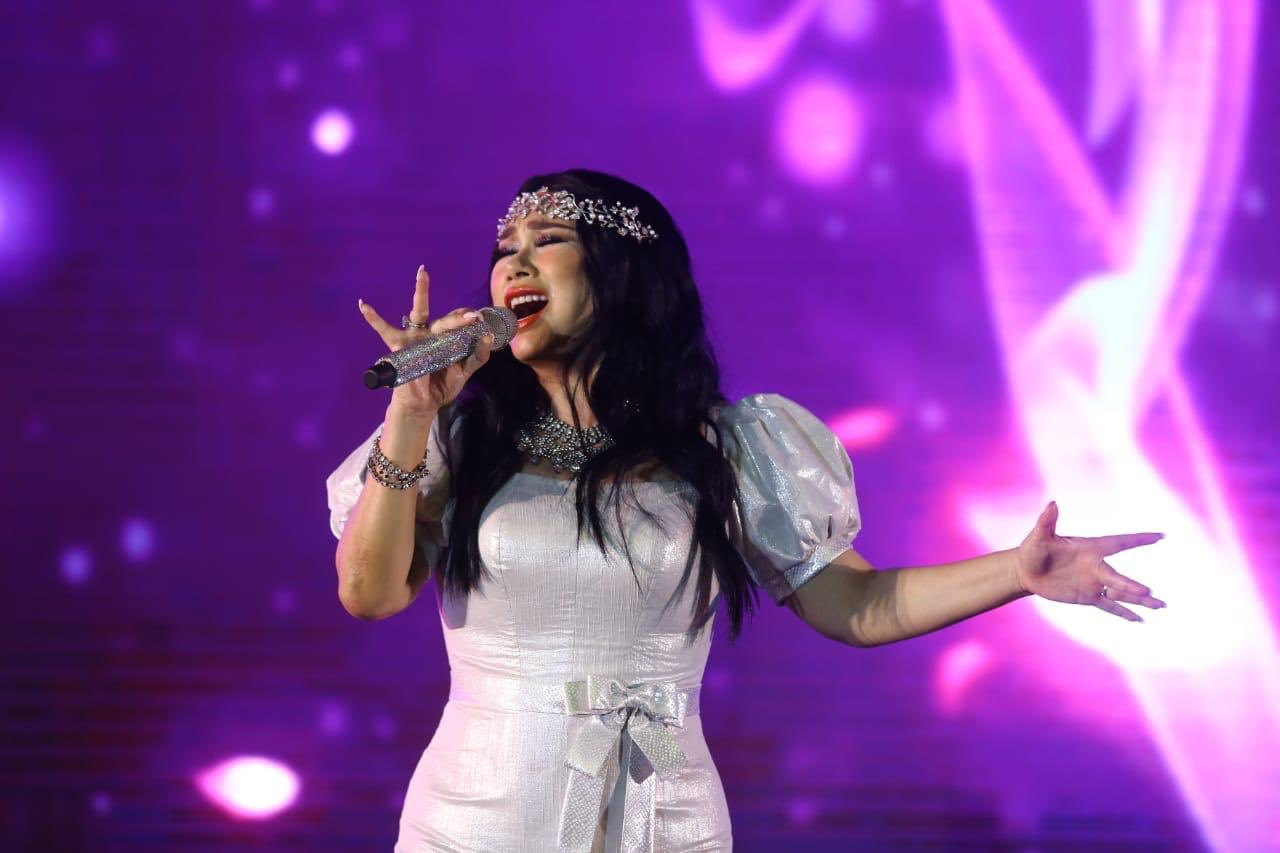
- Titi DJ in 2018
- Born: Titi Dwi Jayati; May 27, 1966 (age 60); Jakarta, Indonesia
- Occupations: Singer; songwriter; actress; reality TV judge
- Years active: 1983–present
- Spouses: Bucek Depp (m. 1995; div. 1997); Andrew Hollis Dougharty (m. 1999; div. 2006); Noviar Rachmansyah (m. 2007; div. 2011)
- Children: 4, including Stephanie Poetri
- Musical career
- Genre: Pop
- Instruments: Vocals; piano
- Labels: Granada; Aquarius; Trinity Optima; Music Factory; E-motion
- Member of: 3 Diva; Truth
- Formerly of: Adarapta; Elfa's Singers

Titi DJ (born on May 27, 1966), is an Indonesian pop singer, songwriter, and beauty pageant titleholder. She was a judge on Indonesian Idol from seasons one to five and season eight, Golden Memories Vol. one and two, Q Academy season one, and The Voice Indonesia seasons three and four. She is known for the song "Sang Dewi". She was the first Indonesian female singer to receive an invitation to perform at Marina Bay Sands in Singapore and the first Indonesian singer to perform seven concerts in four days. She was also the first female coach to win The Voice Indonesia in 2019. In the 1980s, she was widely known for the song Ekspresi (Expression), a jazz fusion hit with which she collaborated with an Indonesian musician, Indra Lesmana, in 1988. In the 1990s, the song Bahasa Kalbu (Voice of the Heart). In the 2000s, she released the songs Sang Dewi, Matamu, Separuh Hidupku, and Hanya Cinta Yang Bisa. In the early 2010s, she released the song "Jangan Biarkan", covering Indonesian singer Diana Nasution. The television channel RCTI hosted the "Jangan Biarkan Concert" with her album "Titi to Diana". In the 2020s, she released the song Show Off Your Colors, in collaboration with Eka Gustiwana, Sarah Fajira, and Ashanty. Her latest release was the song "To Lose" as an answer to a netizen challenge, and she also released a ballad version called "Still Learning".

She represented Indonesia at Miss World 1983 in London, UK, but was unplaced.

Titi DJ's album Bahasa Kalbu (1999), won five awards at the third Anugerah Musik Indonesia Awards, including Album of the Year, Artist of the Year, and Songwriter of the Year.

== Career ==
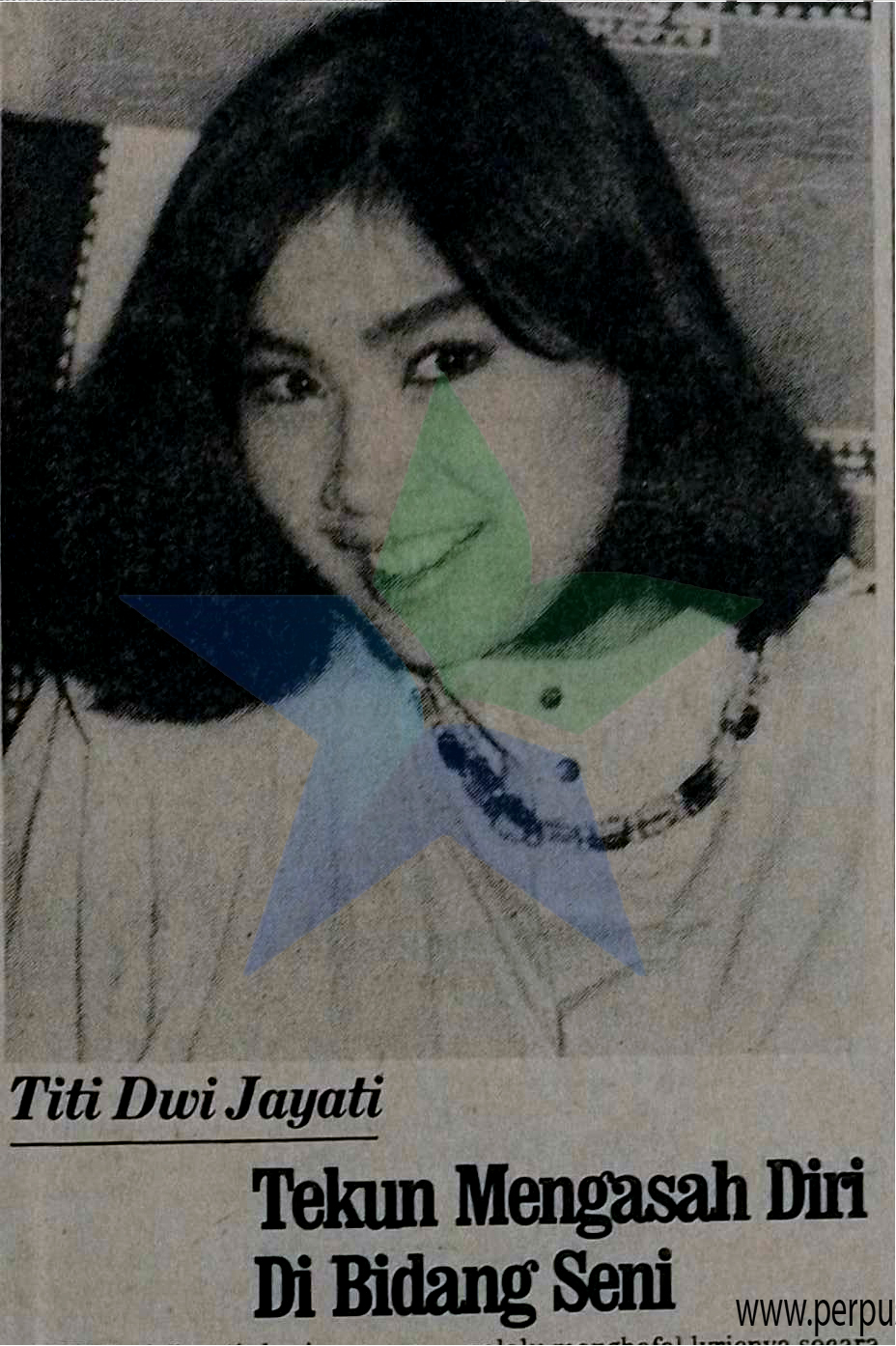
Titi Dwi Jayati, appearing in Sinar Harapan, during her breakout years, 3 February 1985

Titi DJ was born in Jakarta, her parents are of Indonesian Chinese-Batak-Manado-Japanese descent. She began singing on public television as a teenager, with ambitions to become a recording artist. Aged 17, she represented Indonesia in the Miss World 1983 competition but was not a finalist. As a dancer, she performed with Guruh Soekarnoputra's Swara Mahardhikka troupe. She sang backing vocals for Chrisye and appeared in a few movies early in her career. She released her first solo album in 1984, Imajinasi. In the 1990s, she had success with the singles Bintang-Bintang (Stars), Ekspresi (Expression), and Salahkah Aku (Am I Wrong?). Currently, she is in a group called 3 Diva, with Krisdayanti and Ruth Sahanaya.

In 2010, she appeared as Bunda Ratu in Madame X, an action comedy film about a transgender hairdresser who is also a superhero spy.

In 2018, she joined the judging panel of season 3 of The Voice Indonesia.

== Personal life ==
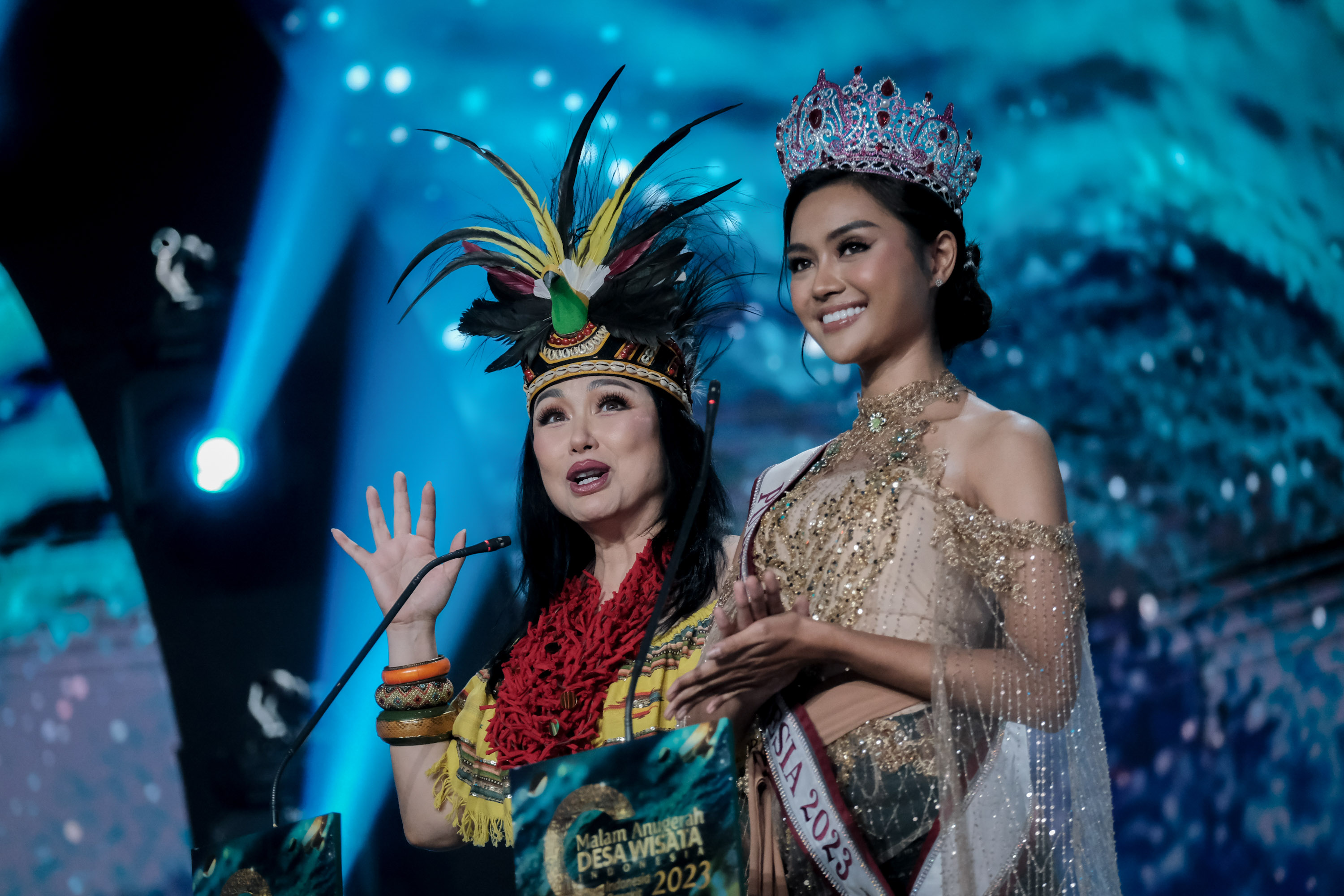
Titi with Miss International Indonesia 2023 Farhana Nariswari in 2023.

Titi's first marriage was to actor Bucek Depp, where she converted to Islam in 1995, and had three children. They divorced in 1997. She then married American teacher Andrew Hollis Dougharty in 1999, and had one child, Stephanie Poetri, who also pursued a musical career. She and Dougharty divorced in 2006. Titi also had a six-year relationship with her musical collaborator, Indra Lesmana. She married Indonesian rock singer Noviar Rachmansyah in 2007, and they divorced in August 2011.

== Discography ==
- Imajinasi (1985)
- Yang Pertama Yang Bahagia (1986)
- Ekspresi (1988)
- Titi DJ 1989 (1989)
- Take me to Heaven (1991)
- Bintang Bintang (1995)
- Kuingin (1996)
- Bahasa Kalbu (1999)
- Senyuman (2003)
- Melayani Hatimu (2005)
- Titi to Diana (2010)
- Titi in Love with Yovie (2015)
- 40 (2024)

== Awards ==
Award	Year	Category	Nominated Work	Result	Ref.
Anugerah Musik Indonesia	1999	Best Album	Bahasa Kalbu	Won	
Anugerah Musik Indonesia	1999	Best Pop Album	Bahasa Kalbu	Won	
Anugerah Musik Indonesia	1999	Best Songwriting	"Bahasa Kalbu" (with Dorie Kalmas & Andi Rianto)	Won	
Anugerah Musik Indonesia	1999	Best Recording Artist	"Bahasa Kalbu"	Won	
Anugerah Musik Indonesia	1999	Best Pop Female Solo Artist	"Bahasa Kalbu"	Won	
Anugerah Musik Indonesia	2003	Best Pop Female Solo Artist	"Penyesalan"	Nominated	
Anugerah Musik Indonesia	2006	Best Pop Female Solo Artist	"Separuh Hidupku"	Nominated	
Anugerah Musik Indonesia	2011	Best Collaborative Production Work	"Jangan Biarkan" (bersama Diana Nasution)	Won	
Anugerah Musik Indonesia	2020	Best Islamic Music Production Work	"Tuhan Jaga Diriku"	Nominated	
Anugerah Musik Indonesia	2021	Best Dance Production Work	"Show Off Your Colors" (bersama Sara Fajira & Eka Gustiwana	Nominated	

Awards and achievements
Preceded by Andi Botenri, Jakarta SCR	Miss World Indonesia; 1983	Succeeded by Lindi Cistia Prabha, Yogyakarta
