= Sheila Majid =

Malaysian singer (born 1965)

Yang Hormat Dato’ Sri Sheila Majid SSAP, DIMP
- شيلاء مجيد
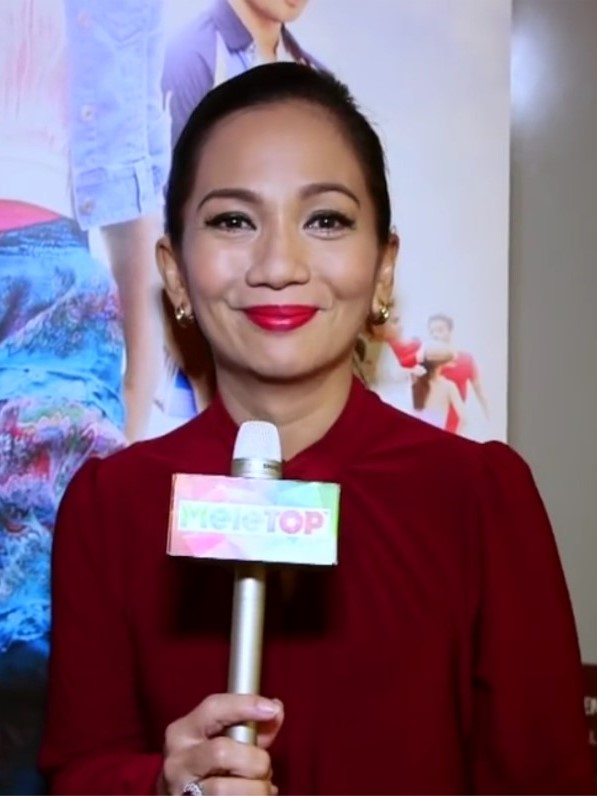
- Born: Shaheila binti Abdul Majid; 3 January 1965 (age 61); Kuala Lumpur, Malaysia
- Occupations: Singer; actress
- Musical career
- Genre: Jazz • Swing-pop • pop rock • R&B • city pop • Pop kreatif
- Instrument: Vocals
- Years active: 1984–present
- Labels: Titra Industries Sdn. Bhd. Roslan Aziz Productions (RAP); EMI (Malaysia) Sdn. Bhd. Warner Music (Malaysia) Sdn. Bhd.

Dato’ Sri Sheila Majid SSAP, DIMP (born Shaheila binti Abdul Majid; 3 January 1965), is a Malaysian pop singer who is best known for her 1986 song, "Sinaran". Her musical prowess especially in the genre of jazz music has led her to be dubbed as Malaysia's Queen of Jazz.

== Biography ==
Sheila Majid was born in Kuala Lumpur, (then in Selangor state), Malaysia on 3 January 1965. Her mother is a native Malay with Mandailing ancestry whose great-great-grandfather was Sutan Puasa, one of the founders of Kuala Lumpur. Her father was a Javanese of Japanese descent (precisely was born in Osaka City, Osaka Prefecture (Kansai region), Japan), whose great-grandfather had settled in Malaya after surviving a shipwreck en route to Java from a pilgrimage in Mecca. Her paternal lineage can be traced back to Raden Hussein, whose brother was the first Muslim sultan of Demak; both were princes of Probowo Wijoyo V of Majapahit.

She attended Convent Goodshepherd Kindergarten, Methodist Girls Primary School and Methodist Girls Secondary School, all in Kuala Lumpur, Malaysia.

=== Music career ===
Music was an integral part of Sheila Majid's life growing up, starting as a hobby but soon blossoming into a lifelong career. Sheila began learning piano at the age of four, and her talent as a singer was discovered by chance when she performed at a friend's gathering at the Raintree Club in Kuala Lumpur at the age of 17. A music publisher, impressed by her voice, introduced her to Roslan Aziz, who conducted her talent test and subsequently offered her a recording contract in 1982. After signing the contract, Sheila took three years to release her debut album, Dimensi Baru, in 1985. The album, featuring the single Pengemis Muda, achieved gold status, marking her first major success. That same year, Sheila made her acting debut in the film Ali Setan, directed by Jins Shamsuddin, where she played Tipah alongside Azmil Mustapha and Ogy Ahmad Daud.

Her second album, Emosi (1986), marked a significant turning point in her career, introducing a unique blend of jazz and R&B that was groundbreaking and unheard of for the Malaysian music scene at the time. Furthermore, through the album, the variations of music within Malaysia were increasingly visible, especially in the music genres introduced by her. The significant touch of jazz and R&B music has opened people's minds at that time to explore music genres, especially Jazz music pioneered by Sheila. Through the Emosi album, she also gained expertise from neighbouring countries, including song arrangement and creation. Therefore, she tried to test the market in Indonesia. To her surprise, she was well received in Indonesia and gained tremendous popularity exceeding that of Malaysia's music scene.

At the time, Indonesia had a burgeoning music scene with the rise of Pop kreatif, a genre that flourished amid the increasing liberalization of the creative industry. Drawing inspiration from Japan's City pop, Pop kreatif reflected the cosmopolitan aspirations and modern lifestyles of Indonesian youth. Sheila Majid's blend of jazz, R&B, and pop perfectly aligned with the sound and sensibilities with the genre and thus resonated strongly with the emerging tastes of Indonesian audiences. Taking note of the success of her Malay songs in Indonesia, she released the first single released for this album was ‘Sinaran’, followed by the second single, ‘Antara Anyer dan Jakarta’ dedicated for the Indonesian market. Popularity in Indonesia from the 'Sinaran' single alone has boosted Sheila from a regional oddity to an international name as ‘Sinaran’ became the first Malay song to top the charts on Radio Sapporo station, in Tokyo. It was also listed at number 38 on Radio Osaka's Carta Top 40.

Sheila's success in Indonesia was exceptional, captivating audiences in major cities like Bandung and Yogyakarta. Despite criticism from some Indonesian media in questioning her popularity and her Malaysian origins, her popularity soared, and she became the first non-Indonesian artist to win the prestigious BASF Award (now the Anugerah Musik Indonesia) for Best Female R&B Artist in 1987 which had never been achieved by a non-Indonesian artist. Her success in Indonesia was further strengthened with a concert tour in 10 cities around the country in June 1988. By 1989, Sheila Majid had also recorded "Dia", a song written by Indonesian composer Randy Anwar and earlier popularised by Vina Panduwinata.

She was invited to perform at the Tokyo Music Festival in 1989. At the same time, she made history when she won a platinum award for her album Warna in 1988. Through a poll conducted by the New Straits Times newspaper, she was voted as the readers' choice star for four consecutive years between 1987 and 1990.

In 2024, Amids the resurgence of city pop/pop kreatif inspired trends, Sheila Majid has seen a revival among the Indonesian-Malaysian music industry. She collaborated with the Indonesian DJ duo Diskoria in a concert in Kuala Lumpur, blending her music with Indonesian disco and funk influences. In a VOI interview, Sheila Majid revealed that she had idolized Indonesian pop kreatif singer Vina Panduwinata for a very long time and expressed her desire to collaborate if the opportunity arose.

== Honours ==
On 24 October 2008, Sheila became the only local artist to receive the Darjah Indera Mahkota Pahang (DIMP) which carries the title of Dato' in conjunction with the 78th Birthday of the Sultan of Pahang, Sultan Ahmad Shah at the Abu Bakar Palace in Pekan, Pahang.

On 1 August 2026, Sheila was granted the Darjah Sri Sultan Ahmad Shah (SSAP) which carries the title of Dato' Sri in conjunction with the 67th Birthday of the Sultan of Pahang, Al-Sultan Abdullah at the Abdulaziz Palace in Kuantan, Pahang.

== Personal life ==
Sheila is married to musician husband Hashridz Murshim bin Hassim, nicknamed Acis, since 2003. She was previously married to music producer and Malaysian Idol judge Roslan Aziz from 1989 to 2000, when the couple divorced in the midst of domestic abuse proceedings against Roslan.
