= Krisdayanti =

Indonesian singer, actress and politician

Kris Dayanti
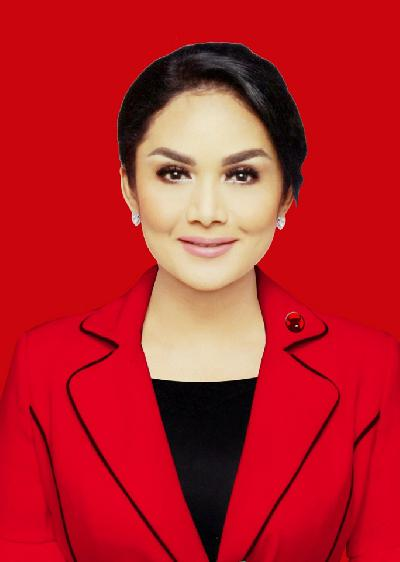
- Kris Dayanti, member of the House of Representatives of the Republic of Indonesia for the period 2019 – 2024.
- Born: 24 March 1975 (age 51); Batu, East Java, Indonesia
- Occupations: Singer; Songwriter; Record producer; Celebrity; Model; Actress
- Spouses: Anang Hermansyah (m. 1996–2009) Raul Lemos (m. 2011)
- Relatives: Yuni Shara (sister); Kartika Sari (sister)
- Musical career
- Genres: Pop; R&B
- Instrument: Vocals
- Labels: Pony Canyon; Warner; Le-Moesiek Revole

Kris Dayanti (born 24 March 1975), often written mononymously as Krisdayanti (Note: Her original name consists of two words, 'Kris Dayanti', but is often written as 'Krisdayanti'. Early in her career, she used the names 'Christ Dayanthy' (Biasa Saja, 1987) or 'Dayanthie' (OST Catatan Si Emon, 1991).) (or shortened as KD), is an Indonesian politician, singer, and actress. She is the younger sister of Yuni Shara, another Indonesian singer. She is the daughter of Trenggono and Rachma Widadiningsih. At the age of 9, she sang a song for the movie Megaloman. Three years later, she released her first album, Biasa Saja, together with the soundtrack album for Catatan Si Emon. While still in high school, Krisdayanti participated in numerous singing and modeling competitions. In 1991, she became one of the finalists in the GADIS magazine's cover model search, called GADIS Sampul.

With the help of Younky Soewarno and Chris Pattikawa, Krisdayanti participated in the 1992 Asia Bagus star-search program, eventually winning the grand prize at the Asia Bagus film festival in Japan. As a result of her success in the competition, Krisdayanti recorded an album in Singapore with Pony Canyon in 1993. She also recorded a single "Show Me the Way to Your Heart" which was released in some Asian countries including Indonesia, Singapore, and Japan. In 1997, she was chosen as "The Best of Asia Bagus". She also won several awards, such as Best Indonesian Album awards for "Menghitung Hari" at 1999 Anugerah Industri Muzik, "Most Wanted Female Artist" and "Most Wanted Indonesian Video" awards for "Menghitung Hari" at MTV Southeast Asia, Best Pop Album awards for "Cinta" at 1997 Anugerah Musik Indonesia, and Most Favorite Female for "Jangan Pergi, Yang Kumau" at 2002 MTV Indonesia Awards. And also several nominations, such as Best Female Supporting Role for "Abad 21" at the 1996 Festival Sinetron Indonesia, International Viewer's Choice Awards for "Menghitung Hari" at 1999 MTV Video Music Awards, and Most Favorite Female for "Mengenangmu" at 2006 MTV Indonesia Awards. During 2004, Krisdayanti held eight concerts in different cities, including some international ones.

Her hit songs and constant concert performances have caused her to be considered the most expensive Indonesian artist to hire for singing or acting, with Swa magazine writing that she earns more than the president of Indonesia. In 1996, she was considered by Tabloid Bintang as one of Indonesia's 6 most prominent female television stars, and in 2007 Globe Asia ranked her 31st in its list of the 99 influential women in Indonesia.

She married Anang Hermansyah, a musician from Jember, East Java, in 1996. Together they had one son (Azriel Hermansyah) and one daughter (Aurelie Hermansyah). During their marriage, tabloids often reported rumors of Krisdayanti being linked to Dicky Wahyudi, Tohpati's guitarist, dan Ari Sigit, a grandson of ex-president Suharto. All rumors were denied by Krisdayanti, who said that her relationship with her husband was fine. They divorced in mid-August 2009, upon Yanti's request.

After divorcing Anang Hermansyah, she reportedly started a relationship with Raul Lemos, a businessman from East Timor. On 20 March 2011, she married Raul Lemos and she had another girl on 5 September 2011 by cesarean section. The name of the girl is Arianna Amora Lemos, which means "Diamond with Full of Love". She then said that she was retiring from the entertainment industry to live in East Timor as a housewife. However, she retracted the statement and said that she wanted to continue singing until old age, similar to Indonesian top senior singer, Titiek Puspa.

In 2018, Krisdayanti has finally officially selected as a candidate for member of the House of Representatives of the Republic of Indonesia in the 2019 Election from the Indonesian Democratic Party of Struggle (PDI-P). Her represents his birthplace, namely the Electoral District of East Java V includes Malang, Malang and Batu. On 14 May 2019, Krisdayanti was successfully elected as a member of the Indonesian House of Representatives for the 2019-2024 period by collecting 132,131 votes.

== Discography ==
Studio albums

- Biasa Saja (1987)
- Terserah (1995)
- Cinta (with Anang) (1996)
- Hanya Tuhan (with Anang) (1996)
- Kasih (with Anang) (1997)
- Sayang (1998)
- Buah Hati (with Anang) (1998)
- Menghitung Hari (1999)
- Mencintaimu (2000)
- Makin Aku Cinta (with Anang) (2000)
- Menuju Terang (with Anang) (2003)
- Cahaya (2004)
- Krisdayanti (2007)
- CTKD (with Siti Nurhaliza) (2009)

Compilation albums

- Semua Jadi Satu (with 3 Diva) (2006)
- 2 Diva (with Siti Nurhaliza) (2008)
- Aku Wanita Biasa (2009)
- Sepuluh Tahun Pertama (with Anang) (2006)
- Dilanda Cinta (with Anang) (2009)
- Persembahan Ratu Cinta (2013)

Live albums

- Konser KD (2001)

Mini albums

- 3 Diva (2008)
- Cintaku Kan Selalu Menemanimu (2011)

Soundtrack albums

- Abad 21 (1997)

== Filmography ==
=== Film ===
Year	Title	Role	Notes
2006	Jatuh Cinta Lagi	Lila	Lead role

=== Television ===
Year	Title	Role	Notes	Network
1989–1990	Jendela Rumah Kita			TVRI
1993	None			TPI
1994	Si Cemplon; – Mawar Mekar di Antara Duri			– SCTV – INDOSIAR
1995	Saat Memberi Saat Menerima			RCTI
1996	Istana Impian	Ayu		RCTI
1997	Abad 21	Rosa		Indosiar
1997	Istri Pilihan			RCTI
1998–1999	Doaku Harapanku	Anisa	Lead role	RCTI
1999	Diantara Dua Pilihan			RCTI
2000	Terpesona			SCTV
2001	Mencintaimu	Cinta	Lead role	SCTV
2002–2003	Doa dan Anugerah	Aisyah	Lead role	Indosiar
2005	Mukjizat Allah	Mayang	Lead role	Indosiar

== TV commercials ==
Year	Title	Role
1991–1995	Mustika Puteri	Herself
1994	Hers Protex	Herself
1997–2007	Hemaviton Action	Herself
1997–2000	McDonald's	Herself
1999–2000	Kirin	Herself
2001	Marimas	Herself
2003	Tradia Peanuts	Herself
2005–present	Laxing	Herself
2006–2007	Indomie	Herself
2009–present	Laxing Tea	Herself
