= Indonesian Idol season 6 =

Indonesian Idol
- Season 6
- Hosted by: Daniel Mananta
- Judges: Erwin Gutawa; Agnes Monica; Anang Hermansyah; Rossa
- Winner: Igo Pentury
- Runner-up: Citra Scholastika
- Finals venue: Central Park Ballroom

Release
- Original network: RCTI
- Original release: March 5 – August 7, 2010

Season chronology
- ← Previous; Season 5 Next → Season 7

Indonesian Idol Season Six is a continuation of the Indonesian Idol show in the year 2010. Indonesian Idol came back after a suspension in the year 2009. What is different in this season is the judge of this event is no longer Titi DJ and Indra, who was replaced by Erwin Gutawa and Agnes Monica. Formation of the judge changed to four persons, namely Erwin Gutawa who acts as chairman of the judge, Agnes Monica, Anang Hermansyah, Rossa and several guest judges temporarily filled in when a judge was unable to come. For the position of the host, remains entrusted to Daniel Mananta which will guide the event this year alone. This season, Indonesian Idol theme is "Be A Superstar". This is the last season where there is a male winner

== Starring ==
=== Host ===
- Daniel Mananta : MTV'S VJ, Presenter, & Actor

=== Judges ===
- Erwin Gutawa (Ketua Juri) : Composer
- Agnes Monica : Singer, Actress
- Anang Hermansyah : Composer & Singer
- Rossa : Singer

Guest Judges :

- Melly Goeslaw : Composer & Singer
- Ahmad Dhani : Producer, Composer & Singer
- Pasha : Band Vocalist
- Charly : Band Vocalist & Composer

=== Contributor ===
- Pasto : Vocal Coach
- Catharina Leimena : Vocal Coach
- Eki Dance Company : Choreographer (Workshop Round)
- Johan Jafar : Choreographer (Spectacular Show - Grand Final)
- Tommy Siawira (Star Harvest Academy) : Public Speaking Class
- Romy : Psychology class (Spectacular Show - Grand Final)

=== Band ===
- Magenta Five : Workshop Round
- Oni & Friends : Spectacular Show - Grand Final

=== Sponsor ===
- IM3
- Clear
- Indomie

== Audition Schedule ==
=== Special Hunt ===
November–December 2009:

- Denpasar
- Palembang
- Makassar
- Manado
- Banjarmasin
- Ambon

=== Mini Auditions (Using the bus) ===
- Cirebon 1–4 December 2009
- Tegal 4–7 December 2009
- Semarang 7–10 December 2009
- Solo 10–13 December 2009
- Madiun 13–16 December 2009
- Malang 16–19 December 2009

=== Large Auditions ===
- Surabaya Kodam Balai Prajurit, December 21–23, 2009
- Medan Griya Dome, January 16–17, 2010
- Yogyakarta Jogja Expo Center (JEC), January 26–27, 2010
- Bandung Sasana Budaya Ganesha (SABUGA), February 1–2, 2010
- Jakarta Mega Glodok Kemayoran, February 15–18, 2010
- Contestants must be aged 16–27 years at the November 16, 2009 and lived in Indonesia.

== Workshop Participants ==
=== Female Participants ===
- Ica - Raizza Intifada, June 30, 1990 (Surabaya)
- Diana - Diana Tuwema, June 19, 1985 (Jakarta)
- Keyko - Keyko Vredhe, April 11, 1989 (Medan)
- Dea - Panendra Larasati, January 18, 1991 (Bandung)
- Mona - Monalisa Lengkong, March 24, 1989 (Manado)
- Tesa - Atresye Novliana Tessa, November 12, 1986 (Surabaya), eliminated April 30
- Zulfa - Zulfa Tisa Shafira, January 15, 1992 (Surabaya), eliminated April 23
- Citra - Skolastika Citra Kirana Wulan, June 5, 1993 (Yogyakarta), eliminated April 16
- QZ - Putri Bilqis Anhudyanti, June 2, 1991 (Bandung), eliminated April 9
- Orin - Corina Reviera, July 30, 1991 (Medan), eliminated April 9
- Mela - Yunita Romela, June 8, 1988 (Palembang), eliminated April 2
- Doremi - Hairani Armaya Doremi, September 30, 1989 (Medan), eliminated April 2

=== Male Participants ===
- Fendi - Fendi, March 7, 1991 (Makassar)
- Ray - Ray Generies Tambunan, July 12, 1985 (Medan)
- Windra - Windra E., October 18, 1986 (Medan)
- Igo - Elicohen C. Pentury, February 19, 1993 (Ambon)
- Gilang - Gilang Saputra, September 7, 1991 (Yogyakarta)
- Rio - Rio Rezky Basir, May 6, 1988 (Makassar), Eliminated April 30
- Michael - Michael C. R. Dotulong, June 3, 1985 (Jakarta), eliminated April 23
- Fauzan - Muhammad Fauzan Julian Razak, July 12, 1990 (Bandung), eliminated April 16
- Andi - Andi Subadja, October 12, 1984 (Bandung), eliminated April 9
- Eza - Dimas Riza Mustajab, April 10, 1984 (Jakarta), eliminated April 9
- Sanni - Sannie Legawanta, July 12, 1985 (Bandung), eliminated April 2
- Bagus - Bagus Gede Perdana Putra, April 14, 1991 (Bali), eliminated April 2

== Workshop Round ==
=== Workshop 1 (April 2, 2010) ===
Numb	Workshop 1		
Numb	Contestants	Song (Origin by)	Result
1	Keyko	"Separuh Nafas" (Dewi Dewi)	Save
2	Fauzan	"Kutak Bisa" (Slank)	Save
3	Ica	"Mati Rasa" (Dewi Sandra)	Save
4	Michael	"Saat Terakhir" (ST 12)	Save
5	Citra	"Mau Dibawa Kemana" (Armada)	Save
6	Windra	"Rindu Setengah Mati" (D'Massive)	Save
7	Mela	"Cindai" (Siti Nurhaliza)	Eliminated
8	Bagus	"Sejuta Rasanya" (Bonus)	Eliminated
9	Rio	"Takkan Terganti" (Kahitna)	Save
10	Tesa	"Pandangan Pertama" (Ran)	Save
11	Sannie	"Kisah Tak Sempurna" (Samsons)	Eliminated
12	Doremi	"Teruskanlah" (Agnes Monica)	Eliminated

=== Workshop 2 (April 9, 2010) ===
Numb	Workshop 2		
Numb	Contestants	Song (Origin by)	Result
1	Igo	"Tak Lekang Oleh Waktu" (Kerispatih)	Save
2	Andi	"Meraih Mimpi" (J-Rocks)	Eliminated
3	Diana	"Kapan Lagi Bilang I Love U" (Dewi Sandra)	Save
4	Dea	"Perih" (Vierra)	Save
5	Fendi	"Status Palsu" (Vidi Aldiano)	Save
6	Orin	"Pernah Muda" (Bunga Citra Lestari)	Eliminated
7	Gilang	"Wajahmu Mengalihkan Duniaku" (Afgan)	Save
8	Zulfa	"Kasih Putih" (Glenn Fredly)	Save
9	QZ	"Hampa Hatiku" (Ungu)	Eliminated
10	Ray	"DeaLova" (Once)	Save
11	Mona	"Jujur Aku Tak Sanggup" (Pasto)	Save
12	Eza	"Tak Lekang Oleh Waktu" (Kerispatih)	Eliminated

=== Workshop 3 (April 16, 2010) ===
Numb	Workshop 3		
Numb	Contestants	Song (Origin by)	Result
1	Tesa	"Matahariku" (Agnes Monica)	Save
2	Gilang	"Malam Biru" (Sandhy Sondoro)	Save
3	Windra	"Isabella" (ST 12)	Save
4	Citra	"Karena Ku Cinta Kau" (Bunga Citra Lestari)	Eliminated
5	Dea	"Masih Cinta" (Kotak)	Save
6	Fauzan	"Terserah" (Glenn Fredly)	Eliminated
7	Fendi	"Buka Hatimu" (Armada)	Save
8	Diana	"Harmoni Cinta" (Gita Gutawa)	Save

=== Workshop 4 (April 23, 2010) ===
Numb	Workshop 4		
Numb	Contestants	Song (Origin by)	Result
1	Ica	"Kekasih Yang Tak Dianggap" (Pingkan Mamboo)	Save
2	Rio	"Separuh Jiwaku Pergi" (Anang Hermansyah)	Save
3	Igo	"Yayaya" (GIGI)	Save
4	Keyko	"Hati Yang Kau Sakiti" (Rossa)	Save
5	Zulfa	"Jika Cinta Dia" (Geisha)	Eliminated
6	Ray	"Biarkan Jatuh Cinta" (ST 12)	Save
7	Michael	"Pemujamu" (ADA Band)	Eliminated
8	Mona	"Aku Harus Jujur" (Kerispatih)	Save

=== Workshop 5 (April 30, 2010) ===
Numb	Workshop 5		
Numb	Contestants	Song (Origin by)	Result
1	Ray	"Rocker Juga Manusia" (Seurieus)	Save
2	Tesa	"Mimpi" (Anggun)	Eliminated
3	Gilang	"Jenuh" (Rio Febrian)	Save
4	Dea	"Mahluk Tuhan Paling Sexy" (Mulan Jameela)	Save
5	Mona	"Jangan Biarkan" (Titi DJ feat Diana Nasution)	Save
6	Fendi	"Diam Tanpa Kata" (d'Masiv)	Save
7	Windra	"Untuk Mencintaimu" (Seventeen)	Save
8	Ica	"Tak Pernah Setengah Hati" (Tompi)	Save
9	Rio	"saat Kau Jauh" (ST 12)	Eliminated
10	Keyko	"Baik Baik Sayang" (Wali band)	Save
11	Diana	"Andai Aku Bisa" (Chrisye)	Save
12	Igo	"Sadis" (Afgan)	Save

== Wildcard Show ==
This system always used in Indonesian Idol before, except series 2, would choose eliminated contestants to perform again and some of them will go to spectacular round

=== Wildcard Contestants ===
8 of 14 eliminated contestants will perform in wildcard show to get 4 contestants to completed top 14 in the spectacular show.

- Mela
- Eza
- Andi
- Citra
- Zulfa
- Michael
- Tesa
- Rio
- Two contestants that have going to Spectacular Show from the highest vote from viewers was Rio and Citra
- Two contestants that have going to Spectacular Show from the Judge's Choice was Tesa and Andi

== Spectacular Show ==
The Sixth Indonesian Idol
Contestants (with elimination date)
Igo Pentury	Winner
Citra Kirana	7 August
Gilang Saputra	23 July
Ray Generies	16 July
Tesa Novliana	9 July
Windra E	2 July
Rio Basier	25 June
Keyko Vredhe	18 June
Diana Tumewa	12 June
Fendi	4 June
Dea Larasati	28 May
Mona Lengkong	21 May
Ica Intifada	21 May
Andi Subagja	14 May

14 Contestants of Indonesian Idol 2010 :

- Andi Subagja : "Bento"
- Rio Basir : "Pemikat Hati"
- Mona Lengkong : "Mutiara Timur"
- Citra Kirana : "Eksotik Jazzy"
- Fendi : "Baby Face"
- Windra E : "Bintang Melayu"
- Gilang Saputra : "Wonder Boy"
- Ica Intifada : "Pop Princess"
- Igo Pentury : "Ambon Manise"
- Tesa Novliana : "Suara Emas"
- Diana Tumewa : "Lady Popera"
- Keyko Vredhe : "Pop Mellow"
- Ray Generies : "Gelegar Medan"
- Dea Larasati : "Mojang Rocker"

=== Spectacular #1 (May 14, 2010) ===
First Spectacular this year place in Hall D2 Kemayoran Pekan Raya Jakarta

No	Contestants	Song (Singer)	Result
1	Ray	"DeaLova" (Once)	Safe
2	Keyko	"Separuh Nafasku" (Dewi-Dewi)	Safe
3	Dea	"Masih Cinta" (Kotak)	Bottom 3
4	Gilang	"Wajahmu Mengalihkan Duniaku" (Afgan)	Safe
5	Rio	"Separuh Jiwaku Pergi" (Anang Hermansyah)	Safe
6	Tesa	"Matahariku" (Agnes Monica)	Safe
7	Citra	"Mau Dibawa Kemana" (Armada Band)	Safe
8	Andi	"Kasih Tak Sampai" (Padi)	Voted Off
9	Windra	"Isabella" (ST 12)	Safe
10	Mona	"Aku Harus Jujur" (Kerispatih)	Safe
11	Ica	"Mati Rasa" (Dewi Sandra)	Bottom 3
12	Fendi	"Status Palsu" (Vidi Aldiano)	Safe
13	Igo	"Pandangan Pertama" (Ran)	Safe
14	Diana	"Harmoni Cinta" (Gita Gutawa)	Safe

=== Spectacular #2 (May 21, 2010) ===
Begin from Second Spectacular Show will attend in Ballroom Hall Central Park, Jakarta.

No	Contestants	Song (Singer)	Result
1	Gilang	"Nakal" (GIGI)	Safe
2	Ray	"Tak Ada Yang Abadi" (Peterpan)	Safe
3	Dea	"Sang Penghibur" (Padi)	Bottom 4
4	Windra	"Walau Habis Terang" (Peterpan)	Safe
5	Diana	"Cinta Ini Membunuhku" (d'Masiv)	Safe
6	Rio	"Cinta Gila" (Ungu)	Bottom 4
7	Tesa	"Jangan Pernah Berubah" (ST 12)	Safe
8	Ica	"Rasa Yang Tertinggal" (ST 12)	Voted Off
9	Fendi	"Sudahi Perih Ini" (d'Masiv)	Safe
10	Citra	"Menghapus Jejakmu" (Peterpan)	Safe
11	Keyko	"Dilema Cinta" (Ungu)	Safe
12	Igo	"Terbakar Cemburu" (Padi)	Safe
13	Mona	"Biarlah" (Nidji)	Voted Off

Mona, contestant from Manado, should be excluded outside the predictions of the judges. The reason Mona mentioned candidates Indonesian Idol 2010.

=== Spectacular #3 (May 28, 2010) ===
No	Contestants	Song (Singer)	Result
1	Citra	"Geregetan" (Sherina)	Safe
2	Fendi	"Masih Disini Masih Denganmu (MD2)" (Goliath)	Bottom 3
3	Diana	"Symphony yang Indah" (Once)	Safe
4	Dea	"Baru Aku Tahu Cinta Itu Apa" (Indah Pertiwi)	Voted Off
5	Gilang	"Akulah Dia" (Drive)	Bottom 3
6	Igo	"Cinta 2 Hati" (Afgan)	Safe
7	Ray	"Aku Padamu" (ST 12)	Safe
8	Tesa	"Pelan-Pelan Saja" (Kotak)	Safe
9	Rio	"Tanya Hati" (Pasto)	Safe
10	Keyko	"Lama-Lama Aku Bosan" (Audy Item)	Safe
11	Windra	"Sahabat Jadi Cinta" (Zigaz)	Safe

=== Spectacular #4 (June 4, 2010) ===
From the top 10 onwards, the judges are eligible to exercise a veto power on one eliminated contestant at any given point of the competition and spare them from elimination for that particular week. This power can only be exercised once.

No	Contestants	Song (Singer)	Result
1	Igo	"Perempuan Paling Cantik Di Negeriku Indonesia" (Dewa 19)	Safe
2	Citra	"Hikayat Cintaku" (Glenn Fredly ft. Dewi Persik)	Bottom 3
3	Rio	"Gelora Asmara" (Derby Romero)	Safe
4	Keyko	"50 Tahun" (Warna)	Safe
5	Ray	"Musnah" (Andra & The Backbone)	Safe
6	Fendi	"Ular Berbisa" (Hello)	Voted Off
7	Tesa	"Mencintaimu Sampai Mati" (Utopia)	Safe
8	Diana	"Love or Money (Cinta Atau Uang)" (Cinta Laura)	Bottom 3
9	Windra	"Kesalahan" (Firman Siagian)	Safe
10	Gilang	"Kamu-kamulah Surgaku" (The Rock)	Safe

=== Spectacular #5 (June 12, 2010) ===
Especially for this Spectacular, held on Saturday, June 12, 2010 for the June 11, 2010, will show the opening ceremony and opening match 2010 FIFA World Cup Group A match between South Africa and Mexico, where the official TV station RCTI become publishers. Spectacular 5 held on 17:30, due to be aired at 20:00 on 2010 FIFA World Cup Group B match between Argentina and Nigeria.

No	Contestants	Song (Singer)	Result
1	Windra	"Kuingin Selamanya" (Ungu)	Safe
2	Gilang	"Cemburu Menguras Hati" (Vidi Aldiano)	Safe
3	Citra	"CINTA" (D'Bagindas)	Bottom 3
4	Keyko	"Saat Kau Tak Di Sini" (Jikustik/Ajeng)	Safe
5	Ray	"Hidupmu Hidupku" (Zigaz)	Safe
6	Rio	"Wanita Terindah" (Drive)	Safe
7	Igo	"Mantan Terindah" (Kahitna)	Bottom 3
8	Tesa	"Gejolak Cinta" (Sandhy Sondoro ft. Indah)	Safe
9	Diana	"Rasa Ini" (Vierra)	Voted Off

=== Spectacular #6 (June 18, 2010) ===
Spectacular 6 held on 17:30, due to be aired at 20:00 on 2010 FIFA World Cup Group C match between Slovenia and the United States. Top 8 Contestants also sing duet with their partner

No	Contestants	Song (Singer)	Result
1	Igo	"Kesalahan Yang Sama" (Kerispatih)	Safe
2	Citra	"Merindukanmu" (D'Massiv)	Safe
3	Windra	"Jalan Terbaik" (Seventeen)	Safe
4	Gilang	"Dosakah Aku" (Nidji)	Safe
5	Ray	"Terlanjur Cinta" (Rossa Ft. Pasha Ungu)	Safe
6	Tesa	"Pujaan Hati" (Kangen Band)	Bottom 3
7	Keyko	"Tinggalkan Saja" (Kotak)	Voted Off
8	Rio	"Tersimpan" (Glenn Fredly)	Bottom 3
*	Keyko & Igo	"Jangan Memilih Aku" (Anang Hermansyah & Syahrini)	
*	Citra & Rio	"Sendiri Lagi" (Beage)	
*	Gilang & Windra	"Teman atau Ratu" (Zigaz)	
*	Tesa & Ray	"Un-Break My Heart" (Toni Braxton)	

=== Spectacular #7 (June 25, 2010) ===
Spectacular 7 held on 17:30, due to be aired at 20:00 on 2010 FIFA World Cup Group G match between Portugal and Brazil.

No	Contestants	Song (Singer)	Result
1	Ray	"Laskar Cinta" (Dewa 19)	Safe
2	Tesa	"Cinta Mati" (Agnes Monica Ft. Ahmad Dhani)	Bottom 3
3	Citra	"Lagu Cinta" (Dewa)	Safe
4	Gilang	"Cinta 'Kan Membawamu Kembali" (Dewa/Reza Artamevia)	Bottom 3
5	Igo	"Pupus" (Dewa)	Safe
6	Rio	"Munajat Cinta" (The Rock Indonesia)	Voted Off
7	Windra	"Risalah Hati" (Dewa)	Safe

=== Spectacular #8 (July 2, 2010) ===
Spectacular 8 held on 17:30, due to be aired at 20:00 on 2010 FIFA World Cup Quarter-finals match between Netherlands and Brazil.

No	Contestants	Song (Singer)	Result
1	Tesa	"I Will Always Love You" (Whitney Houston)	Safe
2	Windra	"Bukan Cinta Biasa" (Afgan)	Voted Off
3	Ray	"Ada Cinta" (Acha Septriasa & Irwansyah)	Safe
4	Gilang	"Mengejar Matahari" (Ari Lasso)	Bottom 3
5	Citra	"Selamanya Cinta" (D'Cinnamons)	Safe
6	Igo	"My Heart" (Acha Septriasa & Irwansyah)	Bottom 3

=== Spectacular #9 (July 9, 2010) ===
Contestants will begin sing 2 songs every their performances

No	Contestants	Song (Singer)	Result
1	Ray	"Mahadewi" (Padi) "To Where You Are" (Josh Groban)	Judges' Safe
2	Gilang	"Aku Cinta Kau dan Dia" (The Rock) "Kamu Harus Pulang" (Slank)	Bottom 3
3	Tesa	"Listen" (Beyoncé) "Selalu Salah" (Geisha)	Voted Off
4	Igo	"Harmoni" (Padi) "Enggo Lari" (Yopie Latul)	Safe
5	Citra	"Yank" (Wali) "Sedari Dulu" (Tompi)	Safe

=== Spectacular #10 (July 16, 2010) ===
No	Contestants	Song (Singer)	Result
1	Citra	"SKJ" (ST 12) "Sejuta Cinta" (Marshanda)	Safe
2	Gilang	"Kebesaranmu" (ST 12) "Cari Pacar Lagi" (ST 12)	Bottom 3
3	Igo	"Saat Terakhir" (ST 12) "Putri Iklan" (ST 12)	Bottom 3
4	Ray	"P.U.S.P.A" (ST 12) "Aku Masih Sayang" (ST 12)	Voted Off

=== Spectacular #11 (July 23, 2010) ===
Contestants will sing 2 songs: 1 song duet with their idol and 1 song solo performance

No	Contestants	Song (Singer)	Result
1	Igo	"Sadis" Ft. Afgan (Afgan) "Cemburu" (Dewa 19)	Bottom 2
2	Gilang	"Malam Biru" Ft. Sandhy Sondoro (Sandhy Sondoro) "Sang Pemimpi" (GIGI)	Voted Off
3	Citra	"Sedari Dulu" Ft. Tompi (Tompi) "Pergilah Kau" (Sherina)	Safe

== Grand Final - Result & Reunioun Show ==
Citra & Igo succeed to break two positions in the Grand Final of Indonesian Idol Season Six held on July 31, 2010, at 9:30 pm in the Ballroom Hall of Central Park, Jakarta.

Two grand finalists will sing three different songs: 1 song judges' choice, 1 song as best performance, and a victory song of creation Anang Hermansyah titled "Kemenangan Cinta".

No	Contestants	Session	Songs (Singer)
1	Citra	Judges' Choice; The Best Performanced; Winning Song	"Pernah Muda" (Bunga Citra Lestari) "C.I.N.T.A" (D' Bagindaz) "Kemenangan Cinta"
2	Igo	Judges' Choice; The Best Performanced; Winning Song	"Andai Aku Bisa" (Chrisye) "Saat Terakhir" (ST 12) "Kemenangan Cinta"

== Elimination ==
Date	Bottom 3/Bottom 4
May 14, 2010	Andi Subagja	Ica Intifada	Dea Larasati
May 21, 2010^{1}	Ica Intifada (2); Mona Lengkong	Rio Basir	Dea Larasati (2)
May 28, 2010	Dea Larasati (3)	Fendi	Gilang Saputra
June 4, 2010^{2}	Fendi (2)	Diana Tumewa	Citra Kirana
June 12, 2010^{3}	Diana Tumewa (2)	Citra Kirana (2)	Igo Pentury
June 18, 2010	Keyko Vredhe	Rio Basir (2)	Tesa Novliana
June 25, 2010	Rio Basir (3)	Gilang Saputra (2)	Tesa Novliana (2)
July 2, 2010	Windra E.	Gilang Saputra (3)	Igo Pentury (2)
July 9, 2010^{4}	Tesa Novliana (3)	Ray Generies^{5}	Gilang Saputra (4)
July 16, 2010^{6}	Ray Generies (2)	Gilang Saputra (5)	Igo Pentury (3)
Date	Bottom 2
July 23, 2010	Gilang Saputra (6)	Igo Pentury (4)
August 7, 2010	Citra Kirana	Igo Pentury

^{1} On 2nd Spectacular Show, 2 contestants must voted off

^{2} Starting from Top 10, the judges might use Veto Rights which the judges could rescue the voted off contestants. Veto Rights can only be used one time only

^{3} 5th Spectacular Show was postponed a day because the opening of 2010 World Cup on June 11, 2010

^{4} On 10th Spectacular Show, 2 contestants must be voted off

^{5} Judges use their Veto Rights to save Ray from elimination

^{6} Judges can't use Veto Rights to save their contestant

== Theme, Guests & Mentor ==
Round	Theme	Guests	Mentor
Spectacular 1	The Best Performanced	Agnes Monica	Agnes Monica
Spectacular 2	A Tribute to Super Band	d'Masiv	Anang
Spectacular 3	Top Hists	Nidji	-
Spectacular 4	Metal vs Dugem	J-Rocks	-
Spectacular 5	Love	Geisha, Marcell Siahaan	-
Spectacular 6	Broken Heart	Vierra	-
Spectacular 7	Tribute to Ahmad Dhani	T.R.I.A.D	Ahmad Dhani
Spectacular 8	Movie Soundtrack	Kotak	-
Spectacular 9	Two Sides	Ungu	-
Spectacular 10	Charly's Nite	ST 12	Charly
Spectacular 11	Superstar's Duet	Afgan, Tompi, & Sandhy Sondoro	-
GRAND FINAL	Judges' Choice; The Best Performanced; Winning Song	Nidji; Agnes Monica; Drive; Anang & Syahrini	-
RESULT & REUNION	Winner Announcement	ST 12; Ungu d'Masiv	-

== Elimination chart ==
Females	Males	Top 24	Wild card	Top 14	Winner

Did not perform	Safe	Safe first	Safe last	Eliminated	Judges' Save

Stage:		Semi-finals					Wild card	Finals											
Date:		4/2	4/9	4/16	4/23	4/30	5/7	5/14	5/21^{1}	5/28	6/4^{2}	6/12^{3}	6/18	6/25	7/2	7/9^{4}	7/16	7/23	8/7
Place	Contestant	Result																	
1	Elicohen C. Pentury					Top 14						Bottom 3			Bottom 3		Bottom 3	Bottom 2	Winner
2	Skolastika Citra Kirana Wulan			Elim			Top 14				Bottom 3	Bottom 3							Runner Up
3	Gilang Saputra					Top 14				Bottom 3				Bottom 3	Bottom 3	Bottom 3	Bottom 3	Elim	
4	Ray Generies Tambunan					Top 14										Saved	Elim		
5	Atresye Novliana Tessa					Elim	Top 14						Bottom 3	Bottom 3		Elim			
6	Windra E					Top 14									Elim				
7	Rio Rezky Basier					Elim	Top 14		Bottom 4				Bottom 3	Elim					
8	Keyko Vredhe					Top 14							Elim						
9	Diana Tumewa					Top 14					Bottom 3	Elim							
10	Fendi					Top 14				Bottom 3	Elim								
11	Panendra Larasati					Top 14		Bottom 3	Bottom 4	Elim									
12-13	Raizza Intifada					Top 14		Bottom 3	Elim										
12-13	Monalisa Lengkong					Top 14			Elim										
14	Andi Subagja		Elim				Top 14	Elim											
15-18	Michael C.R. Dotulong				Elim		Elim												
15-18	Putri Bilqis Anhudyanti		Elim				Elim												
15-18	Yunita Romela	Elim					Elim												
15-18	Zulfa Tisa Shafira				Elim		Elim												
19	Muhammad Fauzan Julian Rizal			Elim															
20-24	Corina Reviera		Elim																
20-24	Dimas Riza Mustajab		Elim																
20-24	Bagus Gede Perdana Putra	Elim																	
20-24	Hairani Armaya Doremi	Elim																	
20-24	Sannie Legawanto	Elim																	

- ^Note 1 On 2nd Spectacular Show, 2 contestants must voted off
- ^Note 2 Starting from Top 10, the judgess is might to use Veto Rights which the judges could rescue the voted off contestants. Veto Rights can only be used one time only
- ^Note 3 5th Spectacular Show postponed a day because the opening of 2010 FIFA World Cup on June 11, 2010
- ^Note 4 On 10th Spectacular Show, 2 contestants must voted off
- ^Note 5 Judges use their Veto Rights to save Ray from elimination

== Awards and nominations ==
=== Panasonic Gobel Awards ===
Year	Category	Nominee(s)	Result
2011	Program Talent Show	Indonesian Idol 2010	Nominated
2011	Presenter Talent Show	Daniel Mananta	Nominated

== See also ==
- Indonesian Idol
- Indonesian Idol (season 1)
- Indonesian Idol (season 2)
- Indonesian Idol (season 3)
- Indonesian Idol (season 4)
- Indonesian Idol (season 5)
- Indonesian Idol (season 7)
- 2011 Panasonic Gobel Awards

Preceded by Indonesian Idol (season 5)	Indonesian Idol; 2010	Succeeded by Indonesian Idol (season 7)
