= Indonesian Idol season 7 =

Indonesian Idol
- Season 7
- Hosted by: Daniel Mananta
- Judges: Anang Hermansyah; Agnes Monica; Ahmad Dhani
- Winner: Regina Ivanova
- Runner-up: Kamasean Matthews
- Finals venue: Ecovention Ocean Ecopark

Release
- Original network: RCTI
- Original release: February 17 – July 7, 2012

Season chronology
- ← Previous; Season 6 Next → Season 8

The seventh season of Indonesian Idol premiered on RCTI on February 17, 2012. The show aired every Friday at 8:00 pm and Re-run aired every Sunday at 1:00 pm. Daniel Mananta returned as the host, while Anang Hermansyah and Agnes Monica returned as the judges, and musician and hits-maker Ahmad Dhani replaced Erwin Gutawa as the third judges. Fabian Dharmawan became the new Executive Producer. Vokal Plus founder & CEO Indra Aziz, and Irvan Nat, both of them are professional vocal couches, became the new in-house mentors to work with the contestants on a weekly basis. Universal Music Indonesia replaced Sony Music Entertainment Indonesia as Idol's official partner record label. Cross Mobile, Coolant, Honda and Mie Sedaap, were the official sponsors of the show. This season followed the same format as American Idol season 11 and used the new title screen & logo with a different font started from Spectacular round.

Season 7 is the first season to have a finale with two female contestants, while the second and third seasons had a finale with two male contestants. It is the first season where a saved contestant, Kamasean Matthews to reach the finale. Regina Ivanova is the second contestants of all seasons had never been in the bottom 2 or 3 prior to the finale and the first to be the winner.

On July 8, 2012, Regina Ivanova became the winner of the seventh season of Indonesian Idol, beating Kamasean Matthews, the first female recipient of the judges' save.

The top two finalists from this season — Regina Ivanova and Kamasean Matthews — and 6th place finalist, Maria Rosalia a.k.a. Rosa Yoladetta were signed to record labels.

== Judges ==
The two official judges, Anang Hermansyah and Ahmad Dhani confirmed on early December 2011. There is some issues that says Agnes Monica will not return as judge due to her duty of her international career In Los Angeles, USA. But on 30 January 2012 Untung Pranoto, Operational Production Manager of RCTI announced all official judges, includes Agnes Monica.

Hedi Yunus, Nina Tamam and Andien were brought as guest judges during the auditions in Medan, Surabaya and Yogyakarta because Agnes Monica didn't appear those auditions. Piyu 'PADI', Audy and Meltho 'PASTO' are the guest judges for school audition in Palembang, Padang, Manado and Ambon. While Nina Tamam, Charly Van Houten, Hedi Yunus and Baron are the guest judges for bus audition.

In the beginning, many people were rumored to be in the running to join the judging panel, including Rossa, Sherina Munaf, Ello, Dewi Sandra, Rio Febrian and Tompi. Rio Febrian and Tompi have said (by their Twitter) that they would not be judges for this show, while Rossa said (by her Twitter) her schedule was busy and that it would probably be only as a guest judge on this season.

== Selection process ==
Cities where the auditions were held.

=== Auditions ===
==== Regional auditions ====
Auditions took place in the following cities:

Episode air date	Audition city	Date	Venue	Callback date	Callback venue	Golden tickets
17 February 2012	Bandung, West Java	4–6 January 2012	Sasana Budaya Ganesha	29 January 2012	RCTI Studio, Jakarta	19
17 February 2012	Yogyakarta, Special Region of Yogyakarta	14–15 January 2012	Jogja Expo Center	16 January 2012	Jogja Expo Center, Yogyakarta	15
24 February 2012	Surabaya, East Java	21–22 December 2011	Balai Prajurit	23 December 2011	Hotel Majapahit, Surabaya	22
24 February 2012	Manado, North Sulawesi	29–30 November 2011	M ICON	23 December 2011	Hotel Majapahit, Surabaya	22
24 February 2012	Ambon, Maluku	3–4 December 2011	Siwalima	23 December 2011	Hotel Majapahit, Surabaya	22
2 March 2012	Medan, North Sumatra	10–11 December 2011	State University of Medan	12 December 2011	Asean International Hotel, Medan	22
2 March 2012	Palembang, South Sumatra	26–27 November 2011	Palembang Sport & Convention Center	12 December 2011	Asean International Hotel, Medan	22
2 March 2012	Padang, West Sumatra	3–4 December 2011	UPI Convention Center	12 December 2011	Asean International Hotel, Medan	22
9 March 2012	Jakarta, Jakarta Special Capital Region	26–28 January 2012	Jakarta International Expo	30–31 January 2012	RCTI Studio, Jakarta	31
Total number of Golden Tickets to Elimination Round						109

Requirement : Contestants must be 16–27 years old before 24 November 2011 and lives in Indonesia at least 5 years.

One auditioner who received widespread publicity was M. Ridho, also known as "Neng Neng Nong Neng", he auditioned with his original song titled "Ku Ingin Kita Lama Pacaran Disini". His catchy song was bought by Ahmad Dhani as 5 million rupiahs and he will get the royalty for 5 years.

==== Online audition ====
Online audition is the new feature in seventh season. Audition was opened from 1–15 January 2012 and can be voted by viewers from YouTube until 23 January 2012. Contestant with the highest 'LIKE' automatically will through to judging in Jakarta.

==== Street auditions & School auditions ====
Street audition held in city centers such as the mall, markets, station, town square and others. While the school auditions held in schools with the best musical talent in each city. Indonesia is first country in the world to do school auditions and these have now been picked up by Indian Idol.

==== Bus audition ====
It's the third season of Indonesian Idol auditioned with the bus. Bus audition has gone to Malang, Madiun, Solo, Semarang, Tegal, Cirebon and Sukabumi.

=== Elimination round ===
The Elimination rounds were held at Studio 4 RCTI Jakarta starting 7 February 2012. There were 109 contestants at the start of Elimination round (one of them was disqualified because didn't attend the judging). The contestants performed solo for the first round, and 52 advanced to the next round, where the contestants performed in groups. The contestants were then separated into five rooms, with two room of contestants being eliminated and one room of contestants that must perform again in front of judges. The remaining 27 contestants made it through to the final "Sing For Your Life" round. In that round, each contestant performed a song of their own choosing. Only 15 contestants made it through to the Top 15.

== Semi-finalists ==
After the 27 remaining contestants sang their final solo in the Sing For Your Life round, they were called one by one to hear the final judgement. The semi-finalists were announced in the 30 March episode, with the top fifteen being revealed at the episode’s end. For personal reasons, Henriyanto, one of Top 15 chosen, withdrew from the competition and was replaced by previously eliminated contestant Kanza Dinar.

Females

Contestant	Age	Occupation	Hometown	Audition Location
Belinda Hanrisna Fueza	20	Cafe singer	Bekasi, West Java	Jakarta, Jakarta Special Capital Region
Intania Ayu	20	College student	Bandung, West Java	Bandung, West Java
Kamasean Yoce Matthews	16	High-school student	Bekasi, West Java	Bandung, West Java
Kanza Dinar Adibah	17	College student	Jakarta, Jakarta Special Capital Region	Jakarta, Jakarta Special Capital Region
Maria Rosalia Yola Detta	20	College student	Solo, Central Java	Yogyakarta, Special Region of Yogyakarta
Ni Putu Ayu Christy Karina	18	High-school student	Semarang, Central Java	Yogyakarta, Special Region of Yogyakarta
Non Dera Anggia Putri Prawitasari	18	College student	Cianjur, West Java	Bandung, West Java
Regina Ivanova Polapa	26	Cafe singer	Jakarta, Jakarta Special Capital Region	Jakarta, Jakarta Special Capital Region
Shandy Eugene Maihulu	27	Marketing staff	Jepara, Central Java	Jakarta, Jakarta Special Capital Region

Males

Contestant	Age	Occupation	Hometown	Audition Location
Dionisius Agung Subagyo	25	Driver	Purwokerto, Central Java	Jakarta, Jakarta Special Capital Region
Febri Yoga Sapta Rahardjo	23	Freelancer	Tegal, Central Java	Jakarta, Jakarta Special Capital Region
Rio Agung Pangestu Hamdan	17	High-school student	Sumedang, West Java	Bandung, West Java
Ivan Saputra	23	College student & Employer	Jakarta, Jakarta Special Capital Region	Jakarta, Jakarta Special Capital Region
Prattyoda Bhayangkara	25	Band-vocalist	Kebumen, Central Java	Jakarta, Jakarta Special Capital Region
Rosandy Sriwidia Nugroho	25	Street-singer	Jakarta, Jakarta Special Capital Region	Jakarta, Jakarta Special Capital Region

== Top 15 show ==
The Top 15 Show was aired LIVE on 6 April at 8:30 pm. Below are the contestants listed in their performance order. The top five viewers' choice and top five judges' choice advanced to the Spectacular. There were fifteen semifinalists, nine females and six males. The contestants perform songs of their choice (there was no particular theme).

Order	Contestants	Song (Original Artist)	Result
1	Non Dera	"Pejuang Cinta" (Hello)	Viewers' Choice
2	Maria Rosalia	"Cinta Terlarang" (The Virgin)	Wild Card
3	Ni Putu Karina	"Apalah Arti Menunggu" (Raisa)	Wild Card
4	Ivan Saputra	"Sedang Ingin Bercinta" (Dewa 19)	Judges' Choice
5	Rosandy Nugroho	"Yang Terlupakan" (Iwan Fals)	Judges' Choice
6	Prattyoda	"Aku Terjatuh" (ST 12)	Viewers' Choice
7	Belinda Fueza	"Satu-Satunya Cinta" (Mahadewi)	Judges' Choice
8	Dionisius Agung	"Sik Asik" (Ayu Ting Ting)	Viewers' Choice
9	Kamasean Matthews	"Akhir Cerita Cinta" (Glenn Fredly)	Judges' Choice
10	Shandy Eugene	"Abracadabra" (Mulan Jameela)	Wild Card
11	Regina Ivanova	"Someone Like You" (Adele)	Viewers' Choice
12	Intania Ayu	"Menangis Semalam" (Audy)	Wild Card
13	Kanza Dinar	"Kulakukan Semua Untukmu" (RAN)	Judges' Choice
14	Rio Agung	"Rindu" (Agnes Monica)	Viewers' Choice
15	Febri Yoga	"I'm Yours" (Jason Mraz)	Wild Card

=== Wild Card round ===
At the end of the episode revealing the top ten, it was announced that the judges (except Anang Hermansyah) wanted to add two more finalists in Spectacular. The five possibilities were Ni Putu Karina, Intania Ayu, Febri Yoga, Maria Rosalia and Shandy Eugene. After the judges discussed, it was announced that Febri Yoga and Maria Rosalia were the top twelve finalists.

Order	Semifinalist	Result
1	Febri Yoga	Agnes' Choice
2	Intania Ayu	Eliminated
3	Maria Rosalia	Dhani's Choice
4	Ni Putu Karina	Eliminated
5	Shandy Eugene	Eliminated

== Finalists ==
- Regina Ivanova Polapa (born December 4, 1985) is from Jakarta, Jakarta Special Capital Region and was 26 years old at the time of the show. She had auditioned for Idol 6 times before and never made it through. She auditioned in Jakarta with Adele's "One and Only". She is the sister of Topodade personnel, Mia Sani who won the DreamGirls Indonesia in 2009. She was the oldest contestant to reach the Spectacular and Finale. Her musical influences are Adele and Beyoncé Knowles. She is the second contestants of all seasons that had never been in the bottom 2 or 3 prior to the finale. Regina was announced as the winner on 7 July 2012.
- Kamasean Yoce Matthews (born June 30, 1995) is from Bekasi, West Java and was 16 years old at the time of the show. She auditioned in Bandung with Agnes Monica's "Cinta Mati". She had competed on season 3 of Akademi Fantasi Indosiar Junior, and made it to the ninth place. She was the youngest contestant to reach the Spectacular and Finale. Her musical influence is Alicia Keys. She was saved from elimination by the judges after receiving the lowest number of votes in the top five round, making her the first female contestant to be saved by the judges. Kamasean was announced as the runner-up on 7 July 2012.
- Prattyoda Bhayangkara (born February 9, 1987) is from Kebumen and was 25 years old at the time of the show. He auditioned in Jakarta with Bad English's "When I See You Smile". He is the vocalist of the Today band. He was eliminated on 23 June 2012 and came in 3rd place.
- Dionisius Agung Subagyo (born April 30, 1986) is from Purwokerto, Central Java and was 25 years old at the time of the show. He was born in Temanggung. He auditioned in Jakarta with "Tanjung Perak" in the jazz version. He impressed the judges with his performance of "Tanjung Perak" in his final solo Sing For Your Life round. He was eliminated on 16 June 2012 and came in 4th place.
- Febri Yoga Sapta Rahardjo (born February 28, 1988) is from Tegal, Central Java and was 23 years old at the time of the show. He auditioned in Bus Audition Tegal with Krisdayanti's "Menghitung Hari". Febri was chosen by Agnes Monica as one of the Wild Cards to join the Top 12 finalists. His musical influence is Matt Bellamy from Muse which his vocal is similar to. He was eliminated on 9 June 2012 and came in 5th place.
- Maria Rosalia Yola Detta (born October 31, 1991) is from Solo, Central Java and was 20 years old at the time of the show. She auditioned in Yogyakarta with Kotak's "Pelan-Pelan Saja". She competed on Suara Indonesia, making it to the finale and placed as first runner-up. Maria was chosen by Ahmad Dhani as one of the Wild Cards to join the Top 12 finalists. She was eliminated on 25 May 2012 and came in 6th place.
- Non Dera Anggia Putri Prawitasari (born December 2, 1993) is from Sukabumi, West Java and was 18 years old at the time of the show. She was born in Cianjur. She auditioned in Bus Audition Sukabumi with Dewa 19's "Cemburu". She was eliminated on 18 May 2012 and came in 7th place.
- Rosandy Sriwidia Nugroho (born August 6, 1986) is from Jakarta, Jakarta Special Capital Region and was 25 years old at the time of the show. He was born in Solo. He auditioned in Jakarta with David Cook's cover song "Always Be My Baby". He used to be vocalist of the Putih band. He was eliminated on 11 May 2012 and came in 8th place.
- Rio Agung Pangestu Hamdan (born July 19, 1994) is from Sumedang, West Java and was 17 years old at the time of the show. He auditioned in Bandung with Ruth Sahanaya's "Ingin Ku Miliki". He impressed the judges with his great voice in the audition room, although his first look wasn't convincing the judges. He was eliminated on 4 May 2012 and came in 9th place.
- Ivan Saputra (born July 12, 1988) is from Jakarta, Jakarta Special Capital Region and was 23 years old at the time of the show. He auditioned in Jakarta with Adera's "Lebih Indah". He was eliminated on 27 April 2012 and came in 10th place.
- Belinda Hanrisna Fueza (born March 7, 1992) is from Bekasi, West Java and was 20 years old at the time of the show. She auditioned in Jakarta. She competed on season 3 of Mamamia, making it to the quarterfinals. Belinda's only appearance in season 7 was during the green mile round. She sang "Selalu Cinta" by Kotak for the Sing for Your Life round and she impressed the judges. She was eliminated on 20 April 2012 and came in 11th place. Her musical influence is Demi Lovato.
- Kanza Dinar Adibah (born June 19, 1994) is from Jakarta, Jakarta Special Capital Region and was 17 years old at the time of the show. She auditioned in Jakarta with Bebi Romeo's "Aku Cinta Kau dan Dia". She was cut in the green mile round, but she was called back by judges to replace Henriyanto, who withdrew from the competition. She was eliminated on 13 April 2012 and came in 12th place.

== Spectacular show ==
This is the fifth season in which there are 10 weeks of the Spectacular and 12 finalists, with one of the 12 finalists eliminated each week. The Andra & The Backbone's "Selamat Tinggal Masa Lalu" became the send-off song played when a contestant is eliminated.

=== Top 12 – The Star is Born ===
Order	Contestant	Song (Original Artist)	Result
1	Maria Rosalia	"Kamu Yang Pertama" (Geisha)	Bottom 3
2	Febri Yoga	"Masih Cinta" (Kotak)	Safe
3	Kanza Dinar	"Price Tag" (Jessie J Ft. B.o.B)	Eliminated
4	Rio Agung	"Sahabat Jadi Cinta" (Zigaz)	Safe
5	Ivan Saputra	"Jaga Selalu Hatimu" (Seventeen)	Safe
6	Non Dera	"I Love You" (Dewi Sandra)	Safe
7	Prattyoda	"Menghujam Jantungku" (Tompi)	Safe
8	Belinda Fueza	"Cinta Pertama dan Terakhir" (Sherina Munaf)	Safe
9	Rosandy Nugroho	"Empat Mata" (D'Bagindas)	Bottom 3
10	Dionisius Agung	"I Love U, Bibeh" (The Changcuters)	Safe
11	Regina Ivanova	"Tertatih" (Kerispatih)	Safe
12	Kamasean Matthews	"Firework" (Katy Perry)	Safe

=== Top 11 – The Biggest Band ===
Order	Contestant	Song (Original Artist)	Result
1	Belinda Fueza	"Terbang" (Kotak)	Eliminated
2	Rosandy Nugroho	"Apa Salahku" (D'Masiv)	Safe
3	Ivan Saputra	"Cinta Putih" (Kerispatih)	Bottom 3
4	Regina Ivanova	"Cemburu" (Dewa 19)	Safe
5	Maria Rosalia	"Risalah Hati" (Dewa 19)	Safe
6	Prattyoda	"Sweet Child O' Mine" (Guns N' Roses)	Safe
7	Kamasean Matthews	"Merindukanmu" (D'Masiv)	Safe
8	Febri Yoga	"Disco Lazy Time" (Nidji)	Safe
9	Non Dera	"Ceria" (J-Rocks)	Safe
10	Rio Agung	"Kasih Tak Sampai" (Padi)	Bottom 3
11	Dionisius Agung	"Viva La Vida" (Coldplay)	Safe

=== Top 10 – Songs of Dedication ===
Order	Contestant	Song (Original Artist)	Result
1	Febri Yoga	"Biarkan Aku Jatuh Cinta" (ST 12)	Safe
2	Ivan Saputra	"Ayah" (Seventeen)	Eliminated
3	Rio Agung	"Bunda" (Melly Goeslaw)	Safe
4	Rosandy Nugroho	"Kehilangan" (Firman Siagian)	Bottom 3
5	Regina Ivanova	"Listen" (Beyoncé Knowles)	Safe
6	Kamasean Matthews	"Moving On" (Andien)	Safe
7	Maria Rosalia	"Segitiga" (Cokelat)	Bottom 3
8	Non Dera	"Leaving on a Jet Plane" (Chantal Kreviazuk)	Safe
9	Dionisius Agung	"Nonton Bioskop (Malam Minggu)" (Benyamin Sueb & Bing Slamet)	Safe
10	Prattyoda	"Cinta Dalam Hati" (Ungu)	Safe

=== Top 9 – Tribute to Judges / Boy & Girl band Indonesia ===
- Guest mentor: Agnes Monica

Order	Contestant	Song (Original Artist)	Result
1	Rosandy Nugroho	"Cinta" (Anang Hermansyah Ft. Krisdayanti)	Safe
2	Non Dera	"Bukan Milikmu Lagi" (Agnes Monica)	Bottom 3
3	Prattyoda	"Cukup Siti Nurbaya" (Dewa 19)	Safe
4	Rio Agung	"Separuh Jiwaku Pergi" (Anang Hermansyah)	Eliminated
5	Kamasean Matthews	"Hanya Cinta Yang Bisa" (Agnes Monica Ft. Titi DJ)	Safe
6	Dionisius Agung	"Makhluk Tuhan Paling Sexy" (Mulan Jameela)	Safe
7	Regina Ivanova	"Tak Ada Cinta Yang Lain" (Dewa 19)	Safe
8	Febri Yoga	"Cinta di Ujung Jalan" (Agnes Monica)	Bottom 3
9	Maria Rosalia	"Teruskanlah" (Agnes Monica)	Safe
10	Rio Agung, Non Dera & Rosandy Nugroho	"Inikah Cinta" (ME)	N/A
11	Febri Yoga, Prattyoda & Dionisius Agung	"I Heart You" (SM*SH)	N/A
12	Regina Ivanova, Maria Rosalia & Kamasean Matthews	"Dilema" (Cherry Belle)	N/A

=== Top 8 – The Power of Love / Duets ===
- Guest judges: Melly Goeslaw

Agnes Monica did not appear on the judging panel for week 5 due to her international album project in Los Angeles, so Melly Goeslaw took her place on the panel. Agnes still judging via Skype from Los Angeles.

Order	Contestant	Song (original artist)	Result
1	Prattyoda	"Tak Bisa Ke Lain Hati" (KLa Project)	Safe
2	Rosandy Nugroho	"Masih Ada" (Ello)	Eliminated
3	Febri Yoga	"Cinta" (Vina Panduwinata)	Safe
4	Dionisius Agung	"C.I.N.T.A" (D'Bagindas)	Safe
5	Non Dera	"Akulah Dia" (Drive)	Bottom 3
6	Kamasean Matthews	"Stand Up For Love" (Destiny's Child)	Safe
7	Maria Rosalia	"Ternyata Cinta" (Padi)	Bottom 3
8	Regina Ivanova	"Can't Stop Lovin' You" (Van Halen)	Safe
9	Rosandy Nugroho & Kamasean Matthews	"Moves Like Jagger" (Maroon 5 Ft. Christina Aguilera)	N/A
10	Dionisius Agung & Non Dera	"Hujan Gerimis" (Benyamin Sueb Ft. Ida Royani)	N/A
11	Prattyoda & Maria Rosalia	"Jika" / "Cinta Kita" / "I Will Survive" (Melly Goeslaw Ft. Ari Lasso) / (Amy Search Ft. Inka Christie) / (Gloria Gaynor)	N/A
12	Febri Yoga & Regina Ivanova	"Mau Tapi Malu" (MAIA Ft. Gita Gutawa)	N/A

=== Top 7 – Viewers' Choice ===
- Guest judges: Dimas Djayadiningrat

Agnes Monica did not appear on the judging panel for week 6 due to her international album project in Los Angeles, so Dimas Djayadiningrat, season 1-3 judge, took her place on the panel.

Order	Contestant	Song (original artist)	Result
1	Non Dera	"Bizarre Love Triangle" (Frente!)	Eliminated
2	Febri Yoga	"Rasa Yang Tertinggal" (ST 12)	Bottom 3
3	Kamasean Matthews	"Firasat" (Marcell Siahaan)	Safe
4	Maria Rosalia	"Cinta Jangan pergi" (Kotak)	Safe
5	Dionisius Agung	"Begadang" (Rhoma Irama)	Bottom 3
6	Regina Ivanova	"Cinta" (Melly Goeslaw Ft. Krisdayanti)	Safe
7	Prattyoda	"When I See You Smile" (Bad English)	Safe
8	Dionisius Agung, Febri Yoga & Prattyoda	"Ekspresi" (Titi DJ)	N/A
9	Kamasean Matthews, Maria Rosalia, Non Dera & Regina Ivanova	"Cintaku" (Chrisye)	N/A

- Group performance: "Jomblowati" (SHE) / "PUSPA" (ST 12) / "Lelaki Buaya Darat" (Ratu) / "Naluri Lelaki" (Samsons) / "Perempuan Paling Cantik di Negeriku Indonesia (T.R.I.A.D) / "Racun Dunia" (The Changcuters) / "Cari Pacar Lagi" (ST 12)

=== Top 6 – Dhani's Choice ===
- Guest mentor: Ahmad Dhani
- Guest judges: Jaclyn Victor

Each contestant performed two songs. Agnes Monica did not appear on the judging panel for week 7 due to her international album project in Los Angeles, so Jaclyn Victor, winner of first season Malaysian Idol, took her place on the panel.

Order	Contestant	Song (original artist)	Result
1	Febri Yoga	"Kamu-Kamulah Surgaku" (T.R.I.A.D)	Safe
2	Dionisius Agung	"Aku Cinta Kau dan Dia" (T.R.I.A.D)	Safe
3	Prattyoda	"Kangen" (Dewa 19)	Bottom 2
4	Regina Ivanova	"Cinta Mati" (Agnes Monica Ft. Ahmad Dhani)	Safe
5	Maria Rosalia	"Pupus" (Dewa 19)	Eliminated
6	Kamasean Matthews	"Keabadian" (Reza Artamevia)	Safe
7	Febri Yoga	"Time Is Running Out" (Muse)	Safe
8	Dionisius Agung	"Rahasia Perempuan" (Ari Lasso)	Safe
9	Prattyoda	"I Want To Break Free" (Queen)	Bottom 2
10	Regina Ivanova	"Set Fire To The Rain" (Adele)	Safe
11	Maria Rosalia	"Sakit Minta Ampun" (Dewi-Dewi Ft. Mulan Jameela)	Eliminated
12	Kamasean Matthews	"Don't Stop Me Now" (Queen)	Safe

=== Top 5 (first week) – The Lucky Songs ===
Order	Contestant	Song (original artist)	Result
1	Dionisius Agung	"Alamat Palsu" (Ayu Ting Ting)	Safe
2	Kamasean Matthews	"Hanya Memuji" (Shanty Ft. Marcell Siahaan)	Saved
3	Febri Yoga	"Hero" (Mariah Carey)	Bottom 2
4	Regina Ivanova	"Andaikan Kau Datang" (Ruth Sahanaya)	Safe
5	Prattyoda	"Black Dog" (Led Zeppelin)	Safe
6	Dionisius Agung	"Sio Mama" (Melky Goeslaw)	Safe
7	Kamasean Matthews	"One And Only" (Adele)	Saved
8	Febri Yoga	"Tanjung Perak" (Waljinah)	Bottom 2
9	Regina Ivanova	"When I See You Smile" (Boyz II Men/Bad English)	Safe
10	Prattyoda	"Cinta Terakhir" (Gigi)	Safe

=== Top 5 (second week) – Favorite & Dream Songs ===
Start on spectacular 9, the show aired Saturday. Spectacular 9 held on 18:00, due to be aired at 22:300 on UEFA Euro 2012 match between Netherlands and Denmark.

Order	Contestant	Song (original artist)	Result
1	Prattyoda	"Kisah Cintaku" (Peterpan)	Bottom 2
2	Regina Ivanova	"Cinta Dua Hati" (Afgan)	Safe
3	Dionisius Agung	"Cari Jodoh" (Wali)	Safe
4	Febri Yoga	"Di Balik Awan" (Peterpan)	Eliminated
5	Kamasean Matthews	"A Thousand Years" (Christina Perri)	Safe
6	Prattyoda	"To Be with You" (Mr. Big)	Bottom 2
7	Regina Ivanova	"I Wanna Dance with Somebody" (Whitney Houston)	Safe
8	Dionisius Agung	"No Woman, No Cry" (Bob Marley)	Safe
9	Febri Yoga	"With or Without You" (U2)	Eliminated
10	Kamasean Matthews	"Mimpi" (Anggun)	Safe

=== Top 4 – Solo & Duet ===
Order	Contestant	Song (original artist)	Result
1	Kamasean Matthews	"Haven't Met You Yet" (Michael Bublé)	Safe
2	Prattyoda	"Mawar Merah" (Slank)	Safe
3	Dionisius Agung	"Yogyakarta" (KLa Project)	Eliminated
4	Regina Ivanova	"Rapuh" (Joeniar Arief)	Safe
5	Prattyoda Bhayangkara & Rossa	"Terlanjur Cinta" (Rossa ft. Pasha)	Safe
6	Dionisius Agung & Rossa	"Jangan Ada Dusta di Antara Kita" (Rossa ft. Broery Marantika)	Eliminated
7	Kamasean Matthews & Judika	"Bukan Dia tapi Aku" (Judika)	Safe
8	Regina Ivanova & Judika	"Making Love Out of Nothing At All" (Air Supply)	Safe

=== Top 3 – Indonesian Hits / International Hits / Tribute to Chrisye ===
Order	Contestant	Song (original artist)	Result
1	Regina Ivanova	"Mantra" (Anggun)	Safe
2	Prattyoda	"Mahadewi" (Padi)	Eliminated
3	Kamasean Matthews	"Butiran Debu" (Rumor)	Safe
4	Regina Ivanova	"How Am I Supposed to Live Without You" (Michael Bolton)	Safe
5	Prattyoda	"Enter Sandman" (Metallica)	Eliminated
6	Kamasean Matthews	"No One" (Alicia Keys)	Safe
7	Regina Ivanova & Chrisye	"Untukku" (Chrisye)	Safe
8	Prattyoda & Chrisye	"Kala Cinta Menggoda" (Chrisye)	Eliminated
9	Kamasean Matthews & Chrisye	"Menunggumu" (Peterpan Ft. Chrisye)	Safe

=== Top 2 – Judge's Challenge / Disney's Duet / Tribute to Vina Panduwinata / Winning Song ===
Order	Contestant	Song (original artist)	Chosen By	Result
1	Kamasean Matthews	"Bad Romance" (Lady Gaga)	Agnes Monica	Runner-up
2	Regina Ivanova	"Déjà Vu" (Beyoncé Knowles Ft. Jay-Z)	Agnes Monica	Winner
3	Kamasean Matthews & Mike Mohede	"Reflection" (Christina Aguilera)	Producer	Runner-up
4	Regina Ivanova & Mike Mohede	"A Whole New World" (Peabo Bryson & Regina Belle)	Producer	Winner
5	Kamasean Matthews	"Di Dadaku Ada Kamu" (Vina Panduwinata)	Self	Runner-up
6	Regina Ivanova	"Aku Makin Cinta" (Vina Panduwinata)	Self	Winner
7	Kamasean Matthews	"Kemenangan" (Kamasean Matthews)	Ahmad Dhani	Runner-up
8	Regina Ivanova	"Kemenangan" (Regina Ivanova)	Ahmad Dhani	Winner

== Elimination chart ==
Females	Males	Top 15	Top 12	Wild Card	Winner

Did Not Perform	Safe	Safe First	Safe Last	Eliminated	Judges' Save

Stage:		Top 15	WC	Spectacular show											Finale
Week:		4/6		4/13	4/20	4/27	5/4	5/11	5/18	5/25	6/1^{1}	6/9	6/16^{2}	6/23	7/7
Place	Contestant	Result													
1	Regina Ivanova	Top 12													Winner
2	Kamasean Matthews	Top 12									Saved				Runner-up
3	Prattyoda	Top 12								Bottom 2		Bottom 2		Elim	
4	Dionisius Agung	Top 12							Bottom 3				Elim		
5	Febri Yoga	WC	Top 12				Bottom 3		Bottom 3		Bottom 2	Elim			
6	Maria Rosalia	WC	Top 12	Bottom 3		Bottom 3		Bottom 3		Elim					
7	Non Dera	Top 12					Bottom 3	Bottom 3	Elim						
8	Rosandy Nugroho	Top 12		Bottom 3		Bottom 3		Elim							
9	Rio Agung	Top 12			Bottom 3		Elim								
10	Ivan Saputra	Top 12			Bottom 3	Elim									
11	Belinda Fueza	Top 12			Elim										
12	Kanza Dinar	Top 12		Elim											
13-15	Ni Putu Karina	Elim													
13-15	Intania Ayu	Elim													
13-15	Shandy Eugene	Elim													

^Note 1 Due to the judges using their one 'Judges' Save' per season, in order to save Kamasean, the 'Top 5' remained intact for another week.
^Note 2 It was only announced that Dionisius Agung received the lowest number of votes this week. The other member(s) of bottom two or three were never revealed, and safe contestants were announced in random order.

== Results show performances ==
Week	Performer(s)	Title
Top 15	Armada	"Mabuk Cinta" "Mau Dibawa Kemana"
Top 15	Sandhy Sondoro	"Anak Jalanan"
Top 12	Agnes Monica	"Rindu"
Top 12	Mulan Jameela feat. Ahmad Dhani	"Terbakar"
Top 12	7Icons	"Jealous"
Top 11	T.R.I.A.D	"Kuingin Kita Lama Pacaran Disini (Neng Neng Nong Neng)"
Top 11	Wali	"Cari Jodoh" "Nenekku Pahlawanku"
Top 10	Bondan Prakoso & Fade 2 Black	"Tetap Semangat"
Top 10	Rini Wulandari	"Mimpi Besarku"
Top 10	Bondan Prakoso & Fade 2 Black Feat. Rini Wulandari	"Kita Selamanya"
Top 9	Sammy Simorangkir	"Sedang Apa dan Dimana"
Top 9	Citra Scholastika	"Pasti Bisa"
Top 9	Sammy Simorangkir & Citra Scholastika	"This Love"
Top 8	Penta Boyz	"Sayang Bilang Sayang"
Top 7	Mahadewa	"Cinta Itu Buta"
Top 7	Setia Band	"Jangan Ngarep"
Top 7	Charly Van Houten Feat. Judika	"Aku Terjatuh"
Top 6	Jaclyn Victor	"I Have Nothing"
Top 6	Afgan	"Bunga Terakhir"
Top 6	Afgan & Jaclyn Victor	"Panah Asmara"
Top 5 Week 1	J-Rocks with male group	"Madu dan Racun"
Top 5 Week 1	Kotak with female group	"Tendangan Dari Langit"
Top 5 Week 1	Kotak	"Apa Bisa"
Top 5 Week 1	J-Rocks	"Ya Aku"
Top 5 Week 2	Mahadewi with male group	"Ayang-Ayangku"
Top 5 Week 2	Mahadewi with female group	"Sumpah I Love You"
Top 4	Rossa	"Tegar"
Top 4	Judika	"Always"
Top 4	The Lucky Laki	"Black Dog"
Top 3	Ari Lasso	"Hampa"
Top 3	Ari Lasso with finalists	"Mengejar Matahari"
Finale	Kamasean Matthews & Regina Ivanova	"Queen of the Night" / "I'm Every Woman"
Finale	Delon Thamrin, Mike Mohede, Judika, Dirly Sompie, Wilson Simon Maiseka, Januarisman, Igo Pentury, Citra Scholastika, Kamasean Matthews & Regina Ivanova	"Salam Bagi Sahabat"
Finale	Mike Mohede	"Malam Biru"
Finale	Delon Thamrin	"Karena Cinta"
Finale	Mike Mohede & Judika	"Semua Untuk Cinta"
Finale	Dirly Sompie	"Kemenangan Hati"
Finale	Wilson Simon Maiseka	"Aku Tetap Milikmu"
Finale	Januarisman	"Harap Kan Sempurna"
Finale	Igo Pentury & Citra Scholastika	"Kemenangan Cinta"
Finale	Anang Hermansyah & Ashanty	"Makin Aku Cinta"
Result & Reunion	Khanza Dinar	"Price Tag"
Result & Reunion	Belinda Fueza	"Cinta Pertama dan Terakhir"
Result & Reunion	Ivan Saputra	"Jaga Selalu Hatimu"
Result & Reunion	Rio Agung	"Rindu"
Result & Reunion	Rosandy Nugroho	"Apa Salahku"
Result & Reunion	Non Dera	"Ular Berbisa"
Result & Reunion	Maria Rosalia	"Risalah Hati"
Result & Reunion	Febri Yoga	"Time Is Running Out"
Result & Reunion	Dionisius Agung	"Sik Asik"
Result & Reunion	Prattyoda	"Enter Sandman"
Result & Reunion	Kamasean Matthews & Regina Ivanova	"Independent Women"
Result & Reunion	Regina Ivanova	"And I Am Telling You I'm Not Going"
Result & Reunion	Kamasean Matthews	"You Are Not Alone / I'll Be There"
Result & Reunion	Prattyoda Ft. Anang Hermansyah & Kidnap	"Biarkanlah"
Result & Reunion	Dionisius Agung Ft. Didi Kempot	"Tanjung Perak" / "Sewu Kuto"
Result & Reunion	Febri Yoga Ft. Gigi	"Terbang"
Result & Reunion	Uki, Lukman, Reza, David	"Bintang di Surga"
Result & Reunion	Regina Ivanova Ft. Uki, Lukman, Reza, David	"Langit Tak Mendengar"
Result & Reunion	Kamasean Matthews Ft. Uki, Lukman, Reza, David	"Cobalah Mengerti"
Result & Reunion	Agnes Monica	"Cinta di Ujung Jalan"
Result & Reunion	Agnes Monica & Ahmad Dhani	"Cinta Mati"
Result & Reunion	Dionisius Agung, Prattyoda & Febri Yoga	"I Heart You" / "Ada Cinta"
Result & Reunion	Regina Ivanova, Kamasean Matthews & Maria Rosalia	"Dilema"
Result & Reunion	Daniel Mananta Ft. Maharasyi	"Bendera (Dance! I Love Indonesia)"
Result & Reunion	Kamasean Matthews & Regina Ivanova	"When You Believe"

== Indonesia Nielsen ratings ==
The premiere was watched by 18.9 million viewers. It was up 10 percent from the previous year's premiere, which was watched by 17.7 million viewers. Season 7 of Indonesian Idol is the most successful series in the history of Indonesian Idol.

Episode	Airdate	Rating/share	
Auditions 1	February 17, 2012	4.1/18.3	#5
Auditions 1	February 19, 2012 (Rerun)	3/20.6	#13
Auditions 1	March 14, 2012 (Rerun)	3.1/21.4	#11
Auditions 2	February 24, 2012	3.8/17.6	#8
Auditions 2	February 26, 2012 (Rerun)	3.6/24.5	#8
Auditions 2	March 15, 2012 (Rerun)	N/A	N/A
Auditions 3	March 2, 2012	4.5/19.9	#5
Auditions 3	March 4, 2012 (Rerun)	3.3/22.6	#9
Auditions 3	March 16, 2012 (Rerun)	2.7/19.2	#12
Auditions 4	March 9, 2012	4.3/18.7	#4
Auditions 4	March 11, 2012 (Rerun)	4.1/31.0	#2
Auditions 4	March 17, 2012 (Rerun)	3.5/25-3	#6
Auditions 4	March 29, 2012 (Rerun)	2.5/18.4	#16
Elimination 1	March 16, 2012	4/18.7	#6
Elimination 1	March 18, 2012 (Rerun)	2.8/21.1	#14
Elimination 1	March 30, 2012 (Rerun)	2/13	#28
Elimination 2	March 23, 2012	4.5/20.2	#4
Elimination 2	March 25, 2012 (Rerun)	2.8/20.4	#14
Elimination 2	March 31, 2012 (Rerun)	N/A	N/A
Elimination 3 & Final Judgement^{a}	March 30, 2012	3.3/14.3	#9
Elimination 3 & Final Judgement^{a}	April 1, 2012 (Rerun)	2.6/20.4	#19
Top 15	April 6, 2012	4.5/23.7	#1
Top 15	April 8, 2012 (Rerun)	3.4/24.7	#12
Spectacular; Top 12	April 13, 2012	4.8/24.5	#3
Spectacular; Top 12	April 15, 2012 (Rerun)	3.4/22.8	#8
Spectacular; Top 11^{b}	April 20, 2012	4.8/24.6	#3
Spectacular; Top 11^{b}	April 22, 2012 (Rerun)	3.1/22.5	#9
Spectacular; Top 10	April 27, 2012	4.3/22.4	#1
Spectacular; Top 10	April 29, 2012 (Rerun)	2.7/14.1	#15
Spectacular; Top 9	May 4, 2012	4.8/25.3	#3
Spectacular; Top 9	May 6, 2012 (Rerun)	N/A	N/A
Spectacular; Top 8	May 11, 2012	4.6/25	#2
Spectacular; Top 8	May 13, 2012 (Rerun)	2.9/16	#14
Spectacular; Top 7	May 18, 2012	4.4/23.9	#4
Spectacular; Top 7	May 20, 2012 (Rerun)	2.7/16.6	#13
Spectacular; Top 6	May 25, 2012	5.3/28.1	#1
Spectacular; Top 6	May 27, 2012 (Rerun)	N/A	N/A
Spectacular; Top 5	June 1, 2012	4.2/25.0	#3
Spectacular; Top 5	June 3, 2012 (Rerun)	N/A	N/A
Spectacular; Top 5 Redux^{c}	June 9, 2012	5.2/22.3	#2
Spectacular; Top 5 Redux^{c}	June 10, 2012 (Rerun)	N/A	N/A
Spectacular; Top 4	June 16, 2012	5.2/26.3	#1
Spectacular; Top 4	June 17, 2012 (Rerun)	2.3/13.1	#23
Spectacular; Top 3	June 23, 2012	5.6/27.5	#1
Spectacular; Top 3	June 24, 2012 (Rerun)	2.5/19.9	N/A
Finale	June 30, 2012	5.5/29.9	#1
Finale	July 1, 2012 (Rerun)	2.0/17.9	N/A
Result & Reunion	July 7, 2012	4.5/25.2	#3
Result & Reunion	July 8, 2012 (Rerun)	2.5/22.9	#15

- ^Note aBegin this episode, the show airs at 8:30 PM
- ^Note bBegin this episode, the show airs at 8:00 PM
- ^Note cBegin this episode, the show airs every Saturday. Especially for this episode, the show airs at 6:00 PM due to UEFA Euro 2012 match Netherlands and Denmark.

== Controversies ==
=== Hendriyanto's Exit ===
Top 15 contestant Hendriyanto decided to withdraw from Indonesian Idol because he was not ready to leave his family in Brastagi.

=== Apkasi's 350 Million Prizes ===
Asosiasi Pemerintah Kabupaten Seluruh Indonesia (Apkasi) or Indonesian Regency Administration Association has given a total Rp 350 million ($36.8 thousand) to Top 5 Indonesian Idol, but it made public controversy why Apkasi support Indonesian Idol whom is foreign franchise with profit oriented and not support local culture interests.

== Southeast Asia television rights ==
Country / Region	Network	Channel	Dubbing	Subtitle
Indonesia (origin)	MNC	RCTI	Indonesian	
Brunei	RTB, MNC	RTB4 International, RCTI, MNC International	Indonesian	Malaysian
Cambodia	TVK	TVK1	Indonesian	Khmer
Laos	LNTV	LNTV1	Indonesian	Lao
Malaysia	STMB, MNC	TV3, RCTI, MNC International	Indonesian	Malaysian
Myanmar	MRTV	Myanmar International	Indonesian	Burmese
Philippines	GMA Network	DZBB-TV	Indonesian	Filipino-Tagalog
Singapore	MediaCorp TV^{10}, MNC	Channel 5^{10}, RCTI, MNC International	Indonesian	English^{10}
Thailand	BEC-TERO, MNC	TV3, RCTI, MNC International	Indonesian	Thai
Timor-Leste	RTTL, MNC	TVTL, RCTI, MNC International	Indonesian	Tetum
Vietnam	VTV	VTV1	Indonesian	Vietnamese

Notes:

1. Republic of Singapore was delayed telecasts in 2012 Indonesian reality television singing competition Indonesian Idol with Indonesian dubbing and English subtitles.

== See also ==
- Indonesian Idol
- Indonesian Idol (Season 1)
- Indonesian Idol (Season 2)
- Indonesian Idol (Season 3)
- Indonesian Idol (Season 4)
- Indonesian Idol (Season 5)
- Indonesian Idol (Season 6)

Preceded by Indonesian Idol (season 6)	Indonesian Idol; 2012	Succeeded by Indonesian Idol (season 8)
