= Indonesian Idol season 8 =

Indonesian Idol
- Season 8
- Hosted by: Daniel Mananta; Lolita Agustine (co-host, Top 15); Pica Priscilla (co-host, Spectacular Show)
- Judges: Anang Hermansyah; Titi DJ; Tantri "Kotak"; Ahmad Dhani; Bebi Romeo (Top 15 & Top 11); Raisa Andriana (Yogyakarta Auditions, Top 9 & Top 5); Indra Lesmana (Yogyakarta Auditions & Top 8)
- Winner: Nowela Elizabeth Auparay
- Runner-up: Husein Alatas
- Finals venue: Hall D2 JIExpo, Jakarta

Release
- Original network: RCTI
- Original release: December 27, 2013 – May 23, 2014

Season chronology
- ← Previous; Season 7 Next → Season 9

The eighth season of Indonesian Idol, also known as Indonesian Idol 2014: A Decade of Dreams, premiered on RCTI on December 27, 2013. Anang Hermansyah and Ahmad Dhani returned as the judges. Agnes Monica was replaced by Tantri of Kotak, and Titi DJ, who returned to the show for her sixth season after her absence in season 6 and 7. Raisa and Indra Lesmana replace Titi and Anang during the Yogyakarta auditions. Later during the Spectacular weeks, Raisa replaced Titi during the Top 9 performances and Tantri during the Top 5. Indra replaced Tantri during the Top 8 performances. Daniel Mananta returns as the host.

The season was the sixth to have four judges, after the first five seasons.

== Judges ==
In September 2013, it was confirmed that Ahmad Dhani and Anang Hermansyah would return as the judges for another season, but was reported that Agnes Monica would not return as the judge for this season. In November 2013, the source wrote that Titi DJ signed a deal to join the panel as the third judge. On December 18, 2013, Tantri and Titi were officially announced as judges for this season. Titi is the first Indonesian Idol 2014 judge to return after being absent in Season 6 and 7.

== Regional auditions ==
In an attempt to refresh the show's audition process, new ways to audition were announced. First is the "Audition Bus Tour", a seven town nationwide tour that will give hopefuls who couldn't make it to one of the large audition cities a chance to try out. The cities are Jember, Malang, Madiun, Solo, Purwokerto, Cirebon and Sukabumi. Idol is also starting the "I Want You" program, which will let friends and family of individuals they think could be the next Indonesian Idol nominate said person in secret by filling out an online form and existing video or URL of their nominee—they must be singing solo and a capella. The chosen auditions will then be surprised on location by a film crew and given an opportunity to advance to the next round. Others way are "Idol Dream Box" and "Daniel's Choice". Finally, online auditions for season 8 were open from November 22–26, 2013. Closed auditions was held in Balikpapan, Ambon, Padang and Makassar. Open auditions took place in the following cities:

Episode Airdate	Audition city	Date	Audition venue	Callback venue	Golden tickets
January 3, 2014	Yogyakarta	October 8–9, 2013	Jogja Expo Centre	Studio 4 RCTI	
January 10, 2014	Surabaya	October 22–23, 2013	Balai Prajurit	Studio 4 RCTI	
January 17, 2014	Medan	October 30–31, 2013	Medan International Convention Center	Studio 4 RCTI	
December 27, 2013	Bandung	November 11–12, 2013	Sasana Budaya Ganesha	Studio 4 RCTI	
January 24, 2014	Jakarta	November 19–20, 2013	Balai Samudera	Studio 4 RCTI	
Total number of tickets to Elimination Rounds					97

== Elimination round ==
Held at the 4th Studio of RCTI for the second straight year, the first day of the elimination round featured the 97 contestants from the auditions round singing solo a cappella. 41 contestants advanced. The next round required the contestants to split up into 10 groups and perform. 27 of them advanced to the finals of the elimination round requiring a solo performance with a full band. 15 of them made it to the Top 15 show where the judges take contestants one by one and tell them if they made the final 15.

== Semi-finals ==
=== Top 15 show ===
The Top 15 Show was aired LIVE on 14 February at 8:00 pm. Due to the flight problem, Anang couldn't attend the show, so he was replaced by Bebi Romeo. The contestants perform songs of their choice (there was no particular theme). 7 contestants who got the most vote would advance automatically, while the judges would decide the contestants who they wanted to advance (Anang revealed his decision via Skype). The remaining 4 got a chance to sing once more, and the public would vote again. At first, it was revealed that only one would move on. There were fifteen semifinalists, ten females and five males. Below are the contestants listed in their performance order.

Order	Contestant	Song	Result
1	Giofanny Elliandrian	"Better Man"	Advanced
2	Aksha Rinelsya	"Andai Aku Bisa"	Wild Card
3	Yunita Nursetia	"I'll Stand by You"	Advanced
4	Windy Yunita	"Burn"	Advanced
5	Ryan De Angga	"Macarena"	Advanced
6	Ajeng Parama Dita	"Another Day in Paradise"	Wild Card
7	Yuka Tamada	"Ironi"	Wild Card
8	Maesarah Nur Zakah	"Honeymoon Avenue"	Advanced
9	Nowela Mikhelia	"Superwoman"	Advanced
10	Miranti Yassovi	"High and Dry"	Dhani's Choice
11	Yusuf Nur Ubay	"Beauty and a Beat"	Wild Card
12	Di Muhammad Devirzha	"Somebody That I Used to Know"	Advanced
13	Dewi Puspita	"Who You Are"	Anang's Choice
14	Husein Alatas	"Bahasa Kalbu"	Titi's Choice
15	Martinha Tereza	"Underneath Your Clothes"	Tantri's Choice

=== Wild Card round ===
Order	Semifinalist	Songs	Result
1	Aksha Rinelsya	"Januari"	Eliminated
2	Ajeng Parama Dita	"Terima Kasih Cinta"	Eliminated
3	Yuka Tamada	"What the Water Gave Me"	Advanced
4	Yusuf Nur Ubay	"One More Night"	Advanced

== Finalists ==
- Nowela Elisabeth Mikhelia Auparay (born December 19, 1987) is a cafe singer from Jayapura, Papua. She was announced as the winner on May 23, 2014.
- Husein Alatas (born July 5, 1989) is a band vocalist from Jakarta, He was announced as the runner-up on May 23, 2014.
- Di Muhammad Devirzha (born May 12, 1990) is a freelancer from Medan, North Sumatra, he came in 3rd place.
- Yuka Tamada (born December 28, 1994) is student from Makassar, South Sulawesi, she came in 4th place.
- Muhammad Yusuf Nur Ubay (born March 29, 1996) is a student from Magelang, Central Java, he came in 5th place.
- Giofanny Elliandrian (born May 16, 1988) is a band vocalist from Manado, North Sulawesi, he came in 6th place.
- Windy Yunita Ghemary (born June 2, 1993) is a student from Jakarta, she came in 7th place.
- Maesarah Nur Zakah (born February 22, 1992) is a student from Bandung, West Java, she came in 8th place.
- Yunita Nursetia Tongke (born April 17, 1987) is a marketing staff from Makassar, South Sulawesi, she came in 9th place.
- Miranti Yassovi Amalia (born January 23, 1989) is wedding singer from Jakarta, she came in 10th place.
- Dewi Puspita Andini (born March 24, 1997) is a student from Madiun, East Java, she came in 11th place.
- Ryan Dewangga 'D' Angga' (born October 25, 1994) is a student from Cirebon, West Java, he came in 12th place.
- Martinha Tereza Cruz Costa Ribeiro de Souza (born February 4, 1990) is a vocal coach from Madiun, East Java, she came in 13th place.

== Spectacular Live Show ==
This episode was first broadcast at 21:00 (UTC+7) on February 21, 2014. In this season, there are 13 weeks of the finals and 13 finalists, with one finalist eliminated per week based on the Indonesian public's votes.

=== Top 13 - Dream Comes True ===
Order	Contestant	Song	Result
1	Miranti Yassovi	"I Don't Know Why"	Safe
2	Ryan D' Angga	"Tetap Mengerti"	Safe
3	Dewi Puspita	"Heart Attack"	Bottom 3
4	Yusuf Nur Ubay	"Proud Mary"	Safe
5	Yuka Tamada	"Dog Days Are Over"	Safe
6	Windy Yunita	"No Air"	Safe
7	Giofanny Elliandrian	"Seperti yang Kau Minta"	Bottom 3
8	Martinha Tereza	"Hummingbird Heartbeat"	Eliminated
9	Husein Alatas	"Impossible"	Safe
10	Maesarah Nur Zakah	"Emotions"	Safe
11	Yunita Nursetia	"I Knew You Were Trouble"	Safe
12	Di Muhammad Devirzha	"Human"	Safe
13	Nowela Mikhelia	"Wrecking Ball"	Safe

- Group Performance: Idola Indonesia (Indonesian Idol theme song)

=== Top 12 - Indonesian Mega Hits ===
Order	Contestant	Song	Result
1	Windy Yunita	"Cinta"	Safe
2	Maesarah Nur Zakah	"Jodoh Pasti Bertemu"	Safe
3	Ryan D' Angga	"Kenangan Terindah"	Eliminated
4	Yunita Nursetia	"Takkan Ada Cinta Yang Lain"	Safe
5	Miranti Yassovi	"Terserah"	Safe
6	Yuka Tamada	"September Ceria"/"September"	Safe
7	Giofanny Elliandrian	"Tak Bisa Kelain Hati"	Safe
8	Nowela Mikhelia	"Apanya Dong"	Safe
9	Yusuf Nur Ubay	"Tercipta Untukku"	Bottom 3
10	Di Muhammad Devirzha	"Bintang di Surga"	Safe
11	Dewi Puspita	"Pertama"	Bottom 3
12	Husein Alatas	"Kamu Kamulah Surgaku"	Safe

- Group Performance: Idola Indonesia (Indonesian Idol theme song)

=== Top 11 (first week) - Worldwide Top Chart ===
On the Top 11, was announced the new system, so the contestant with two fewest vote (bottom two) will sing again, and the public will vote to decide who stay and go (named Flash Vote).

Order	Contestant	Song	Result
1	Yusuf Nur Ubay	"Treasure"	Safe
2	Yunita Nursetia	"It Must Have Been Love"	Safe
—N/a	Windy Yunita	—N/a^{1}	Given bye
3	Dewi Puspita	"Because of You"	Safe
4	Di Muhammad Devirzha	"Vertigo"	Safe
5	Giofanny Elliandrian	"You're Still the One"	Safe
6	Nowela Mikhelia	"Rude Boy"	Safe
7	Miranti Yassovi	"Mirrors"	Bottom 2
8	Hussein Alatas	"Wake Me Up"	Bottom 2
9	Yuka Tamada	"Happy"	Safe
10	Maesarah Nur Zakah	"Broken-Hearted Girl"	Safe

^1 Due to the passing of her father, Windy Yunita did not perform and were given a bye to the next week. She would have performed "She Wolf (Falling to Pieces)". On the result show, it was planned that the bottom 2 vote getters would sing once again, and the public would vote again (Flash Vote). However, the bottom two vote getters, Husein Alatas and Miranti Yassovi were declared safe with another contestant and no one was eliminated.

=== Top 11 (second week) - My Love Story ===
It was revealed on the previous week that 2 contestants will be eliminated.

Order	Contestant	Song	Result
1	Giofanny Elliandrian	"Sandiwara Cinta"	Safe
2	Dewi Puspita	"Unfaithful"	Bottom 3
3	Yusuf Nur Ubay	"Sorry Seems to Be the Hardest Word"/"When I Was Your Man"	Safe
4	Windy Yunita	"She Wolf (Falling to Pieces)"	Safe
5	Maesarah Nur Zakah	"Pemeran Utama"	Bottom 3
6	Yuka Tamada	"In a Sentimental Mood"	Safe
7	Husein Alatas	"Sobat"	Safe
8	Miranti Yassovi	"Baby, I Love Your Way"	Bottom 3
9	Di Muhammad Devirzha	"Daylight"	Safe
10	Nowela Mikhelia	"Uninvited"	Safe
11	Yunita Nursetia	"Cinta Sejati"	Safe
Flash Vote
1	Dewi Puspita	"Nobody's Perfect"	Eliminated
2	Maesarah Nur Zakah	"The Voice Within"	Safe
3	Miranti Yassovi	"(They Long to Be) Close to You"	Eliminated

=== Top 9 - The Soundtracks ===
Order	Contestant	Song	Featured Movie	Result
1	Yuka Tamada	"Sweet Disposition"	500 Days of Summer	Bottom 3
2	Yusuf Nur Ubay	"Dalam Mihrab Cinta"	Dalam Mihrab Cinta	Safe
3	Di Muhammad Devirzha	"Unchained Melody"	Ghost	Safe
4	Maesarah Nur Zakah	"There You'll Be"	Pearl Harbor	Bottom 3
5	Windy Yunita	"Angel"	City Of Angels	Safe
6	Yunita Nursetia	"Tough Lover"	Burlesque	Bottom 3
7	Giofanny Elliandrian	"Superman (It's Not Easy)"	Smallville	Safe
8	Nowela Mikhelia	"Let It Go"	Frozen	Safe
9	Husein Alatas	"Skyfall"	Skyfall	Safe
Flash Vote
1	Yunita Nursetia	"All by Myself"		Eliminated
2	Maesarah Nur Zakah	"Best Thing I Never Had"		Safe
3	Yuka Tamada	"Seven Days in Sunny June"	The Devil Wears Prada	Safe

=== Top 8 - We Will Rock You ===
Order	Contestant	Song	Result
1	Husein Alatas	"Toxicity"	Safe
2	Maesarah Nur Zakah	"I'm with You"	Bottom 2
3	Yusuf Nur Ubay	"Good Old-Fashioned Lover Boy"	Bottom 2
4	Di Muhammad Devirzha	"Last Nite"	Safe
5	Windy Yunita	"The Final Countdown"/"Smells Like Teen Spirit"	Safe
6	Nowela Mikhelia	"Black Dog"	Safe
7	Yuka Tamada	"Under Pressure"/"Ice Ice Baby"	Safe
8	Giofanny Eliandrian	"I'll Be There for You"	Safe
Flash Vote
1	Yusuf Nur Ubay	"As Long As You Love Me"	Safe
2	Maesarah Nur Zakah	"That's the Way It Is"	Eliminated

- Group Performance:
  - We Will Rock You / I Love Rock 'n Roll
  - Idola Indonesia (Indonesian Idol theme song)

=== Top 7 - Instant Hits ===
- Guest Mentor: Ruben Studdard

Order	Contestant	Song	Result
1	Di Muhammad Devirzha	"Story of My Life"	Safe
2	Giofanny Eliandrian	"Lumpuhkan Ingatanku"	Safe
3	Yuka Tamada	"Demons"	Bottom 2
4	Nowela Mikhelia	"Team"	Safe
5	Husein Alatas	"Di Belakangku"	Safe
6	Windy Yunita	"All of Me"	Bottom 2
7	Yusuf Nur Ubay	"Jar of Hearts"	Safe
Flash Vote
1	Yuka Tamada	"On & On"	Safe
2	Windy Yunita	"California King Bed"	Eliminated

- Group Performance: Idola Indonesia (Indonesian Idol theme song)

=== Top 6 (first week) - Judges' Choice ===
For the first time in the competition, each finalist will sing two songs. Both songs will be chosen by the finalists with an advice from their own mentor.

Contestant	Mentor
Ubay & Yuka	Ahmad Dhani
Nowela & Gio	Titi DJ
Husein	Tantri
Virzha	Anang Hermansyah

Contestant	Order	First Song	Order	Second Song	Result
Yusuf Nur Ubay	1	"Satu-satunya Cinta" / "Careless Whisper"	7	"Take a Bow"	Bottom 2
Nowela Mikhelia	2	"Sang Dewi"	8	"The One That Got Away"	Safe
Yuka Tamada	3	"Immortal Love Song"	9	"All I Wanna Do"	Safe
Husein Alatas	4	"Pelan-Pelan Saja"/"Masih Cinta"	10	"Unintended"	Bottom 2
Di Muhammad Devirzha	5	"Aku Lelakimu"	11	"Everybody's Changing"	Safe
Giofanny Eliandrian	6	"Bintang-Bintang"	12	"Don't Speak"	Safe
Flash Vote
Yusuf Nur Ubay	1	"Moves Like Jagger"			Saved
Husein Alatas	2	"Far from Home"			Safe

- Group Performance: Idola Indonesia (Indonesian Idol theme song)

=== Top 6 (second week) - From East To West ===
Each finalist will sing two songs: one will be in Indonesian (especially Dangdut and Melayu (in Indonesian)), and the other one in English. There is no more veto rights for this round and the Flash Vote system will be no longer used.

Contestant	Order	Solo	Order	Collaboration	Result
Yuka Tamada	1	"Kata Pujangga"	7	"Say Something"	Safe
Yusuf Nur Ubay	2	"Yank"	8	"Love You Like a Love Song"	Safe
Di Muhammad Devirzha	3	"Satu Jam Saja"	9	"Hey, Soul Sister"	Safe
Giofanny Elliandrian	4	"Aku Masih Sayang"	10	"Just the Way You Are"	Eliminated
Nowela Mikhelia	5	"Rekayasa Cinta"	11	"Empire State of Mind (Part II) Broken Down"	Safe
Husein Alatas	6	"Madu Tiga"	12	"Counting Stars"	Bottom 2

=== Top 5 - From the Bottom of the Heart ===
Each finalist will sing two songs: one will be a song about their own interpretation of galau and the other one will be a tribute to their fans.

Contestant	Order	First Song	Order	Second Song	Result
Husein Alatas	1	"Kekasih Yang Tak Dianggap"	6	"In The End"	Safe
Yuka Tamada	2	"Akhir Cerita Cinta"	7	"The A Team"	Safe
Nowela Mikhelia	3	"Bukan Dia Tapi Aku"	8	"Unconditionally"	Safe
Yusuf Nur Ubay	4	"Pupus"	9	"Clarity"	Eliminated
Di Muhammad Devirzha	5	"Jangan Pernah Berubah"	10	"Friday I'm in Love"	Safe

- Group Performance: Sahabat

=== Top 4 - The Fabulous Four ===
Each finalist will sing three songs: a solo performance, duet with celebrity, and a collaboration with one of the contestants and one of the judges.

Contestant	Order	Solo	Order	Duet	Result
Husein Alatas	1	"Titanium"	5	"Decode" (with Novita Dewi)	Safe
Di Muhammad Devirzha	2	"Message in a Bottle"	6	"I Don't Want to Miss a Thing" (with Regina Ivanova)	Safe
Yuka Tamada	3	"Get Lucky"	7	"Ain't No Mountain High Enough" (with Afgan Syahreza)	Eliminated
Nowela Mikhelia	4	"(You Make Me Feel Like) A Natural Woman"	8	"Just Give Me a Reason" (with Sandhy Sondoro)	Safe

- Husein and Vierzha with Titi DJ - "Cinta Mati"
- Yuka and Nowela with Tantri - "Jangan Ada Angkara"

=== Top 3 - Road to Grand Final ===
Each finalists will sing three songs: International Diva songs (solo performance), duet with celebrity, and a collaboration with one of the contestants and one of the judges.

Contestant	Order	First Song	Order	Second Song	Result
Nowela Mikhelia	1	Run The World	4	"Hanya Memuji" (with Marcell)	Safe
Husein Alatas	2	"Bad Romance"	5	"Locked Out of Heaven" (with Rian D'Masiv)	Safe
Di Muhammad Devirzha	3	"Try"	6	"Endless Love" (with Raisa)	Eliminated

- Husein and Virzha with Ahmad Dhani - "One of Us"
- Nowela and Anang Hermansyah - "Jodohku"
- Group Performance
  - "We Are Young"
  - "Esok Kan Bahagia" & "Jangan Menyerah" (with D'Masiv)

=== Grand Final ===
Contestant	Order	Song 1 (singer)	Order	Song 2 (singer)	Order	Song 3 (singer)	Order	Song 4 (winning song)	Order	Song 5 (singer)	Order	Song 6 (singer)	Order	Song 7 (winning song)	Results
Nowela Elizabeth Auparay	1	"Only Girl (In The World)" (Rihanna)	3	"Apakah Ini Cinta" (Judika)/"Alone" (Heart; with Judika)	5	"Roar" (Katy Perry)	7	"Membawa Cinta" (Padi)	9	"Respect" (Aretha Franklin)	11	"Mercy" (Duffy)	13	"I Believe I Can Fly" (R Kelly)	Winner
Husein Alatas	2	"Khayalan Tingkat Tinggi" (Noah)	4	"Ku Pinang Kau Dengan Bismillah" (Pasha "Ungu" ft. Rossa; with Rossa)	6	"Semua Tak Sama" (Padi)	8	"Membawa Cinta" (Padi)	10	"Bayangan Semu" (Ungu)	12	"Smoke On The Water" (Deep Purple)	14	"Dealova" (Once)	Runner-up

- Opening:
  - Indonesian Idol All Stars - "Bohemian Rhapsody"
  - Nowela - "Let It Go" / "Bukan Dia Tapi Aku" / "Wrecking Ball"
  - Husein - "Skyfall" / "Madu Tiga" / "Titanium"
  - Nowela & Husein - "Don't Stop Believin'" & "It's My Life"
- Closing:
  - Indonesian Idol All Stars - "Karena Cinta"
  - Nowela & Husein feat. Indonesian Idol All Stars - "Idola Indonesia" (Indonesian Idol theme song)

== Elimination Chart ==
Females	Males	Top 20	Top 13	Wild Card	Winner

Did Not Perform	Safe	Top Vote	Safe First	Safe Last	Eliminated	Judges' Save

Stage:		Top 15	Wild Card	Spectacular Show												
Week:		2/14		2/21	2/28	3/7	3/14	3/21	3/28	4/4	4/11	4/18	4/25	5/2	5/9	5/23
Place	Contestant	Result														
1	Nowela Mikhelia	Top 13		Top 3	Top 3	Top 3	Top 3	Top 3	Top 2	Top 2	Top 2	Top 2				Winner
2	Husein Alatas	Top 13				Bottom 2		Top 3			Bottom 2	Bottom 2				Runner-up
3	Di Muhammad Devirzha	Top 13		Top 3	Top 3	Top 3	Top 3	Top 3	Top 2	Top 2		Top 2			Elim	
4	Yuka Tamada	Wildcard	Top 13					Bottom 3		Bottom 2	Top 2			Elim		
5	Yusuf Nur Ubay	Wildcard	Top 13		Bottom 3				Bottom 2		Saved		Elim			
6	Giofanny Elliandrian	Top 13		Bottom 2								Elim				
7	Windy Yunita	Top 13				—N/a^{1}	Top 3			Elim						
8	Maesarah Nur Zakah	Top 13					Bottom 3	Bottom 3	Elim							
9	Yunita Nursetia	Top 13		Top 3	Top 3	Top 3		Elim								
10—11	Dewi Puspita	Top 13		Bottom 3	Bottom 3		Elim									
10—11	Miranti Yassovi	Top 13				Bottom 2	Elim									
12	Ryan D' Angga	Top 13			Elim											
13	Martinha Tereza	Top 13		Elim												
14–15	Aksha Rinelsya	Wildcard	Elim													
14–15	Ajeng Parama Dita	Wildcard	Elim													

^1 Due to the passing of her father, Windy Yunita did not perform and were given a bye to the next week.

== Results show performances ==
Week	Performer(s)	Title
Top 15	Keith Martin and Luananda	"Because Of You"
Top 13	Judika ft Penta Boyz	"Mama Papa Larang"
Top 12	Mulan Jameela ft The Law	"Abracadabra"
Top 11 (Week 1)	Kotak	"Inspirasi Sahabat"
Top 11 (Week 2)	Cakra Khan	"Mengingat Dia"
Top 9	-	-
Top 8	Indra Lesmana & Ahmad Dhani	"Manusia"
Top 8	Phil Stacey	"Blaze of Glory"
Top 7	Agnez Mo	"Shut 'Em Up" "Things Will Get Better"
Top 6 (Week 1)	Sammy Simorangkir	"Kau Harus Bahagia"
Top 6 (Week 2)	Repvblik	"Selimut Tetangga"
Top 5	Yovie & Nuno	"Sakit Hati"
Top 4	Sandhy Sondoro	"Asmara Kita"
Top 4	Afgan	"Katakan Tidak"
Top 3	Citra Scholastika	"Alasan Terbesar"
Grand Final	Indonesian Idol All Stars: Delon Thamrin; Mike Mohede; Judika Sihotang; Ihsan Tarore; Dirly Sompie; Rini Wulandari; Wilson Maiseka; Aris Runtuwene; Gisella Anastasia; Igo Pentury; Citra Skolastika; Regina Ivanova; Kamasean Matthews	"Bohemian Rhapsody" "Karena Cinta"
Grand Final	Mahadewa	"Immortal Love Song"
Grand Final	Rossa	"Hijrah Cinta"
Grand Final	Tulus	"Sepatu"
Result & Reunion	Top 11 Contestants: Martinha Tereza; Ryan D'Angga; Dewi Puspita; Miranti Yassovi; Yunita Nursetia; Maesarah Nurzakah; Windy Yunita; Giofanny Elliandrian; M. Yusuf Nur Ubay; Yuka Tamada; Di Muhammad De Virzha	"Underneath Your Clothes" "Macarena" "Heart Attack" "High and Dry" "It Must Have Been Love" "Honeymoon Avenue" "Burn" "Sandiwara Cinta" "Pupus" "Happy" "Satu Jam Saja"
Result & Reunion	Iwa K & Top 11 contestants	"Malam Ini Indah"
Result & Reunion	Anang Hermansyah, Ahmad Dhani & Di Muhammad De Virzha	"Pupus"
Result & Reunion	Kotak	"I Love You"

== Indonesia Nielsen ratings ==
Episode list

#	Episode	Air date	Ratings / Share HH
1	"Auditions #1: Bandung"	December 27, 2013	
2	"Auditions #2: Yogyakarta"	January 3, 2014	
3	"Auditions #3: Surabaya"	January 10, 2014	
4	"Auditions #4: Medan"	January 17, 2014	TVR 4,8 (23.7%)
5	"Auditions #5: Jakarta"	January 24, 2014	TVR 4,2 (23.8%)
6	"Elimination Round, Part 1"	January 31, 2014	TVR 4,6 (23.7%)
7	"Elimination Round, Part 2"	February 7, 2014	TVR 4,2 (24.4%)
8	"Top 15"	February 14, 2014	TVR 3,5 (18.7%)
9	"Top 13"	February 21, 2014	TVR 3,4 (17.5%)
10	"Top 12"	February 28, 2014	TVR 3,1 (19.3%)
11	"Top 11, Week 1"	March 7, 2014	TVR 3,2 (16.4%)
12	"Top 11, Week 2"	March 14, 2014	TVR 3,3 (17.8%)
13	"Top 9"	March 21, 2014	TVR 3,3 (16.4%)
14	"Top 8"	March 28, 2014	TVR 3,3 (16.9%)
14	"Top 7"	April 4, 2014	TVR 2,4 (14.7%)
14	"Top 6, Week 1"	April 11, 2014	TVR 3 (15.5%)
15	"Top 6, Week 2"	April 18, 2014	TVR 2.9 (17.3%)
16	"Top 5"	April 25, 2014	TVR 2.8 (14.1%)
17	"Top 4"	May 2, 2014	TVR 2,7 (16.7%)
18	"Top 3"	May 9, 2014	TVR 3.2 (18.2%)
19	"Grand Final"	May 16, 2014	TVR 3.1 (16.1%)
20	"Result&Reunion"	May 23, 2014	TVR 3.3 (20.8%)
