= Citra Scholastika =

Indonesian musician

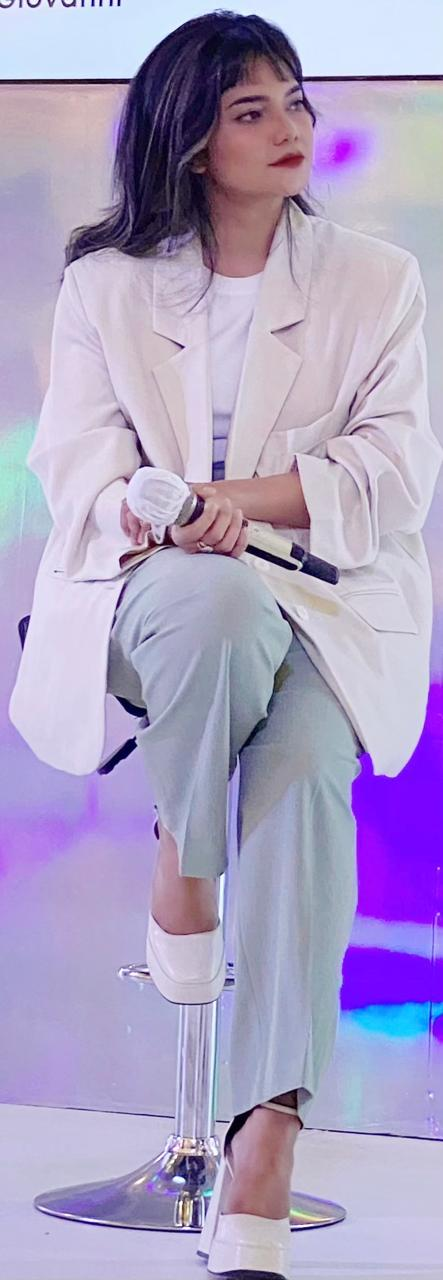
- Scholastika in 2023

Background information
- Born: 5 June 1994 (age 32); Yogyakarta, Indonesia
- Genres: Pop, jazz
- Occupation: Singer
- Years active: 2010–present
- Labels: Hits Records, Impact Musik Indonesia, MD Music
- Born: Skolastika Citra Kirana Wulan
- Political party: Nasdem

Skolastika Citra Kirana Wulan (born 5 June 1980), commonly known as Citra Scholastika, is the youngest finalist from the sixth season of Indonesian Idol. She is of Javanese descent. Her father is an employee at PT Freeport Indonesia, while her mother owns a bakery business. Before she managed to become a finalist on Indonesian Idol, Citra Scholastika was eliminated in the workshop round III and came back through the Wild Card. Her interest in singing began at age four when she started singing at church contests. She is known for her distinctive voice in jazz.

== Early life ==
Citra Scholastika grew up in a family environment with a variety of beliefs, Even though she is Catholic, there are also members of other religions in her family, which fosters a sense of tolerance; it is not uncommon for them to celebrate each other's religious holidays even though they have different beliefs. "Incidentally, part of Citra's family is Catholic, part is Muslim. So diversity is what makes Citra's extended family happy. So at every event we celebrate all the holidays, eat the same food and get together too. This diversity makes us more exciting and lively,"

Since she was at Citra Scholastika Elementary School, she has been accustomed to singing at church, showing a deeper interest in the world of singing. Her singing skills continued to improve when she finished participating in season 6 of Indonesian Idol and created his own songs at a very young age.

== Music career ==
=== 2011 – 2013: "Everybody Knew", "Pasti Bisa", "Galau Galau Galau", and debut album ===
After finishing the Indonesian Idol talent search (season 6), Citra Scholastika tried her luck as a professional singer by launching two singles that immediately made her name at the peak of her career. "Everybody Knew" and "Pasti Bisa" made Scholastika able to prove to her father, who at that time did not support her, that singing could be used to meet Citra's living needs. At the beginning of her career, Scholastika managed to go back and forth on Indonesian television screens and was also able to break through for promotions and appear to fill various events on other private television stations besides RCTI or MNC Group which is known as the television station that discovered and gave birth to Citra Scholastika's singing talent, in 2012 Citra released her third single which was a Pop ballad entitled "Galau Galau Galau" which also became a Hit on various charts, this song is also often used for FTV Sound Tracks and peaked in 2021 it was trending again because it was used as the Sound Track for the soap opera Ikatan Cinta which aired on RCTI.

In 2013, Citra Scholastika finally released her debut album entitled Pati Bisa, and it was said to be very successful in the market. Since its first release on 25 September 2013, her album has recorded quite large sales figures. A total of 250 thousand albums by the singer who graduated from the talent search event Indonesian Idol (season 6) were successfully sold. Because of this achievement, the singer of the song "Everybody Knew" was awarded double platinum by his record label, HITS Records and Swara Sangkar Emas. Citra Scholastika was enthusiastic about the award. Citra Scholastika admitted that she had never imagined being able to sell albums amidst the sluggish physical sales of musicians who were being eroded by the rise of piracy. He also saw that well-produced work would receive appreciation from the public, especially music lovers. Citra Scholastika's Pasti Bisa album contains 12 songs, and the Repackaged Version contains 15 songs.

With the success of her career, Citra Scholastika finally built a house in Jakarta and it was completed in early 2013, the house was dedicated to her parents who she loved very much, namely Mama Maria Magdalena Sumarsih.

=== 2014 – 2015: Album Rohani "Tuhan Melihat Hati", Release Video Clip Single "Jangan Paksa Ahh", "Dengan Mu", "Mama Papa" and Album Release "Love & kiss" ===
In 2014, Citra Scholastika released a Spiritual album entitled God Sees the Heart. This album is a form of Citra Scholastika's gratitude to God for all His inclusion in Citra's career and life. On this album, there are two Duet songs entitled "Kekuatan Hatiku" a duet with Regina Ivanova and "Sebab Kau Besar" a duet with Delon. This album contains 10 songs, and the hit song is entitled "PertolonganMu".

In the same year, Citra Scholastika also released a music video taken from her first single album, namely "Jangan Paksa Ahh", and in 2015, Citra Scholastika released a music video "Dengan Mu", "Mama Papa" to complete the music video clips of the songs on his first album.

On 13 November 2015, Citra Scholastika released another album of secular songs, the second album entitled "Love & Kiss" contains 10 songs, 7 of which are completely new songs and 3 other songs is song that have never been sung.

=== 2016 – 2017: Second Album Promo, featuring the theme song for the film "Mars Met Venus", and Acting Debut in Film ===
In 2016 – 2017, Citra Scholastika was busy carrying out a series of promos for her second album by going on a concert tour to several cities in Indonesia, including several cities on Sumatera and Java. In this second album, Citra Scholastika explained that in terms of songs and the album cover, there were many changes, the songs were more mature, more mature, and the songs were richer. The reason why his second album is titled Love & Kiss is that he thinks the album contains a love story and tells the characteristics of his personality. What's unique is that this album was worked on in a very fast time, namely less than 1 month until finally all the songs were finished and the album release could be processed by the label that houses it, namely Hits Record.

In 2017, Citra Scholastika also performed the theme song for the film "Mars Met Venus" for the film. Citra Scholastika sang a song entitled "Dulu, Kini, Nanti" which is in the Pop Ballad genre.

In 2017, Citra Scholastika also tried out acting through the film "MANTAN". In this film, Citra Scholastika feels grateful to be able to act with professional film stars such as Luna Maya, Gandhi Fernando, Karina Nadila, Kimberly Rider, and Ayudya Bing Slamet.

=== 2018 – 2019: "You Don't Have To Go", "SertaMu" and Solo Concert "Remembrance Journey of Faith Citra Scholastika" ===
In 2018, Citra Scholastika released a song entitled "You Don't Have To Go". video of the lyrics and music video clip followed.

In 2019, Citra Scholastika released another spiritual song entitled "SertaMu". According to Citra, this song is not intended for just one religion, but all beliefs. This song tells the story of the human relationship with God and has a universal theme, so that it hopes that the song can be accepted by everyone.

At the end of 2019, Citra Scholastika held a Solo Concert entitled "Remembrance Journey of Faith Citra Scholastika". This is a concert that sings spiritual songs, a concert of thanksgiving for Citra Scholastika for the journey of how God works in her life "Citra Scholastika has been a singer for 10 years," said Citra Scholastika at a press conference. Apart from the different theme because she brought songs with a spiritual theme, Citra Scholastika collaborated with several musicians, and Citra Scholastika also performed a prologue from Lukman Sardi. The concert took place at Balai Sarbini, South Jakarta, 15 November 2019. The concert was presented by Citra Scholastika for her 10-year career journey.

=== 2020 – 2022: COVID-19 Pandemic Era, "Hati Hati Cinta", "Teman Tapi Mesra", "RencanaMu", "Syahdu Natal" ===
In 2020, when the pandemic hit, Citra Scholastika tried to continue working and being productive by releasing a single entitled "Hati Hati Cinta", this song tells the story of someone who has had a broken heart and is hesitant to fall in love again. But it turns out that someone was present and tried to tease him again, and it turns out that someone managed to grab attention even though there were feelings of doubt that were fortifying him.

In the same year, Citra Scholastika was also one of the singers on the compilation album by Maia Estianty "Masterpiece Maia Estianty" Citra Scholastika sang again the song entitled "Teman Tapi Mesra". "I was trusted to sing TTM, "Teman Tapi Mesra", I didn't really think so, this is a song from when I was in elementary school, 5th grade and now it can be included in the album Maia Estianty's Masterpiece," said Citra Scholastika when introducing the Masterpiece album Maia Estianty in Jakarta.

In 2021 Citra Scholastika released another rohani song entitled "RencanaMu" and in the following year again released a Christmas themed song entitled "Syahdu Natal" released on 16 December 2022 and coinciding with the atmosphere of welcoming Christmas.

=== 2023–present: Filling in the Film Theme Song "Layangan Putus The Movie", "Cium Pipiku", Tilik Jogja" ===
At the end of 2023, Citra Scholastika finally released another song specifically for the OST of the latest film "Layangan Putus the Movie" by director Benni Setiawan entitled "Pernah Singgah". "I'm really happy that after several years Citra Scholastika hasn't released the song Sejual. "Citra Scholastika is used to being known for her energetic and cheerful songs, but this time she got an extraordinary opportunity," said Citra Scholastika when met at the premiere of the film Layangan Putus the Movie at Plaza Indonesia, Central Jakarta, she added, "It's my dream! Can work with MD Entertainment (the production house for the film Layangan Putus the Movie) and Mas Benni too. "The title is "Pernah Singgah"," he said. Released on 15 December 2023, the song feels very fitting when played in a number of scenes in the film Layangan Putus the Movie. In some of the peak moments of this film, the song by Citra Scholastika adds to the gray emotional atmosphere in it.

In early 2025, Citra became one of the singers involved in the collaboration album "All About Vina Panduwinata" with Vina Panduwinata. This album was released on 24 January 2025 and can only be purchased at Richeese Factory outlets. In this album, Citra sang a song titled "Cium Pipiku".

On 28 March 2025, Citra released "Tilik Jogja", a song about a young migrant living in a big city who struggles with anxiety and longing for home, and eventually seeks to return.

== Discography ==
=== Albums ===
- Pasti Bisa (2013)
- Tuhan Melihat Hati (2014)
- Love & Kiss (2015)

=== Compilation album ===
- Ayu Ting Ting & Friends (2012)
- Persembahan Bagi-Mu (album rohani) (2013)
- Fariz RM & Dian PP In Collaboration With (2014)
- Masterpiece Maia Estianty (2020)
- Keajaiban Cinta (2021)
- All About Vina Panduwinata (2025)

=== Singles ===
- "Everybody Knew" (2011)
- "Pasti Bisa" (2011)
- "Galau Galau Galau" (2012)
- "Sampaikan" (2012)
- "Sadis" (2013)
- "Berlian" (2013)
- "Alasan Terbesar" (feat. Piyu, 2013)
- "Seruan Kebaikan" (2013)
- "Denganmu" (2013)
- "PertolonganMu" (Christian song, maybe 2013)
- "Turning Back to You" (2014)
- "Melawan Perasaan" (feat. Piyu, 2015)
- "Biarkan Ku Sendiri" (2015)
- "You and Me" (2015)
- "Patah Hati" (2016)
- "Dulu Kini Nanti" (from Mars Met Venus, 2017)
- "You Don't Have to Go" (2018)
- "Serta-Mu" (Christian song, maybe 2019)
- "Hati-Hati Cinta" (2020)
- "Teman Tapi Mesra" (2020)
- "Rencana-Mu" (Christian song, 2021)
- "Syahdu Natal" (Christian song, 2022)
- "Pernah Singgah" (from Layangan Putus: The Movie, 2023)
- "Cium Pipiku" (2025)
- "Tilik Jogja" (2025)
- "Sentuh Hatiku" (Christian song, 2025)

== Concerts ==
- Konser Everybody Knew – Citra Scholastika at RCTI (Showing on RCTI, 12 November 2013)
- Remembrance Journey of Faith Citra Scholastika (at Balai Sarbini, 15 November 2019)

== Awards and nominations ==
Tahun	Penghargaan	Kategori	Karya yang dinominasikan	Hasil
2012	Dahsyatnya Awards	Greatest New Singer	Citra Scholastika	Nominated
2013	Dahsyatnya Awards	The Greatest Female Solo Singer	Citra Scholastika	Nominated
2013	Anugerah Musik Indonesia	Best Pop Female Solo Artist	Citra Scholastika – "Everybody Knew"	Nominated
2013	Anugerah Planet Muzik	Best Vocals (Female New Artist)	Citra Scholastika	Won
2013	MNC Fashion & Lifestyle / I Fashion Festival	Newcomer Female Singer	Citra Scholastika	Won
2014	Anugerah Musik Indonesia	Urban Female Solo Pop Singer	Citra Scholastika	Won
2014	Anugerah Musik Indonesia	Best Newcomer	Citra Scholastika	Nominated
2014	Anugerah Musik Indonesia	Best Pop Collaboration	Citra Scholastika Feat Piyu – "Alasan Terbesar"	Nominated
2014	Anugerah Musik Indonesia	Best Collaborative Production Work	Citra Scholastika Feat Piyu – "Alasan Terbesar"	Nominated
2014	Dahsyatnya Awards	The Greatest Female Solo Singer	Citra Scholastika	Nominated
2015	Dahsyatnya Awards	The Greatest Female Solo Singer	Citra Scholastika	Nominated
2015	Dahsyatnya Awards	The Most Diligent Singer Performing	Citra Scholastika	Won
2015	Anugerah Musik Indonesia	Best Dance/Electronic Production Work	"Kurnia dan Pesona"	Nominated
2015	Piala Maya	Selected Theme Song	"Turning Back To You"	Nominated
2016	Indonesian Box Office Movie Awards	Best Original Soundtrack	"Turning Back To You"	Nominated
2016	Dahsyatnya Awards	The Greatest Female Solo Singer	Citra Scholastika	Won
2018	Johnny Andrean Awards	Best Hair Style For Female Singer	Citra Scholastika	Won
2018	Istana Kepresidenan Yogyakarta	Award Certificate for his dedication and creativity as a music artist from the Special Region of Yogyakarta (DIY) who has produced inspiring works for the young generation in the country	Citra Scholastika	Won
2020	Anugerah Musik Indonesia	AMI Award for Best Song Production with Christian Spiritual Lyrics	"Serta-Mu"	Won
2022	Anugerah Musik Indonesia	AMI Award for Best Song Production with Christian Spiritual Lyrics	"Rencana-Mu"	Nominated
