= Pangeran Cinta =

Studio album by ST 12
- Released: 2010
- Genre: Pop
- Label: Trinity Optima Production

ST 12 chronology
P.U.S.P.A Repackage (2009)	Pangeran Cinta (2010)

Singles from Pangeran Cinta
- 1. "Aku Padamu"; 2. "Dunia Pasti Berputar"; 3. "Aku Terjatuh"

Pangeran Cinta is the fourth album by Indonesia pop band ST 12. Lead single from this album is Aku Padamu.

== Track listing ==
1. Terlalu
2. Setiaku
3. Aku Padamu
4. Dunia Pasti Berputar
5. Pangeran Cinta
6. Masa Kecil
7. Lady Sky
8. Aku Terjatuh
9. Anugerah Cinta
10. I Love You
11. Sayyidina
12. Sebuah Kenyataan
