= Richeese Factory =

Indonesian fast food restaurant chain

PT Richeese Kuliner Indonesia
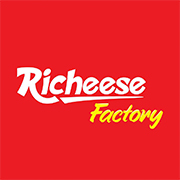
- Trade name: Richeese Factory
- Type: Private
- Industry: Restaurant
- Genre: Fast food restaurant
- Founded: 8 February 2011; 15 years ago
- Headquarters: Bandung, West Java, Indonesia,
- Products: Fried chicken
- Owner: Nabati Group
- Website: richeesefactory.com

Richeese Factory is an Indonesian fast food restaurant chain specializing in fried chicken served with cheese sauce. It is owned by PT Richeese Kuliner Indonesia, a subsidiary of Nabati Group. The chain was established in Bandung, Indonesia in 2011.

== History ==
Richeese Factory opened its first restaurant on 8 February 2011 at Paris Van Java shopping mall in Bandung, West Java. It is operated by PT Richeese Kuliner Indonesia, part of Nabati Group.

Its parent company, Nabati Group, was originally a snack manufacturer established as PT Nabati Jaya Indonesia, later renamed PT Kaldu Sari Nabati Indonesia in 2007.

== Locations ==
Richeese Factory has a chain of stores in Indonesia, Malaysia and China.

=== Indonesia ===
As of 2024, the chain had 300 outlets across Indonesia.

=== Malaysia ===
In 2019, Richeese Factory Malaysia Sdn. Bhd. was established as a subsidiary of Nabati Group. On 4 February 2023, Richeese Factory opened its first outlet in Malaysia, located at the 1 Utama shopping mall in Bandar Utama. To support expansion in Malaysia, in November 2024 Indonesia’s export financing agency, LPEI, provided a financing facility. As of 2024, there are 57 outlets in Malaysia.

=== China ===
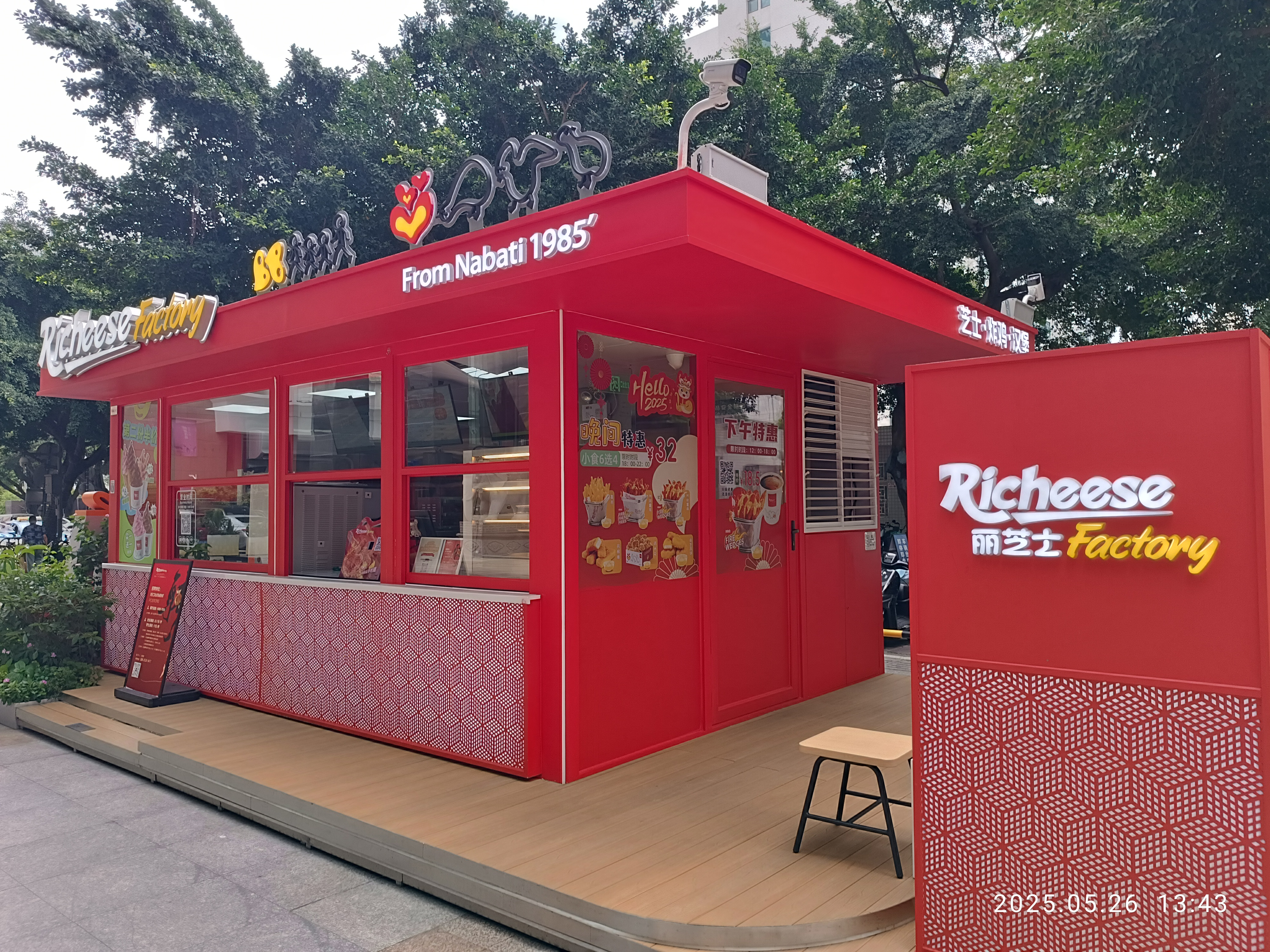
Richeese Factory food stall in ShiXia Times Square, Shenzhen

Nabati Group entered the Chinese market by establishing its subsidiary, Richeese (Guangzhou) Catering Management Co., Ltd., in July 2024 with headquarters in Nansha District, Guangzhou, and opening its first Richeese Factory outlet in Shenzhen on 28 August 2024. As of 2024, there are four outlets in China.

== Menu ==
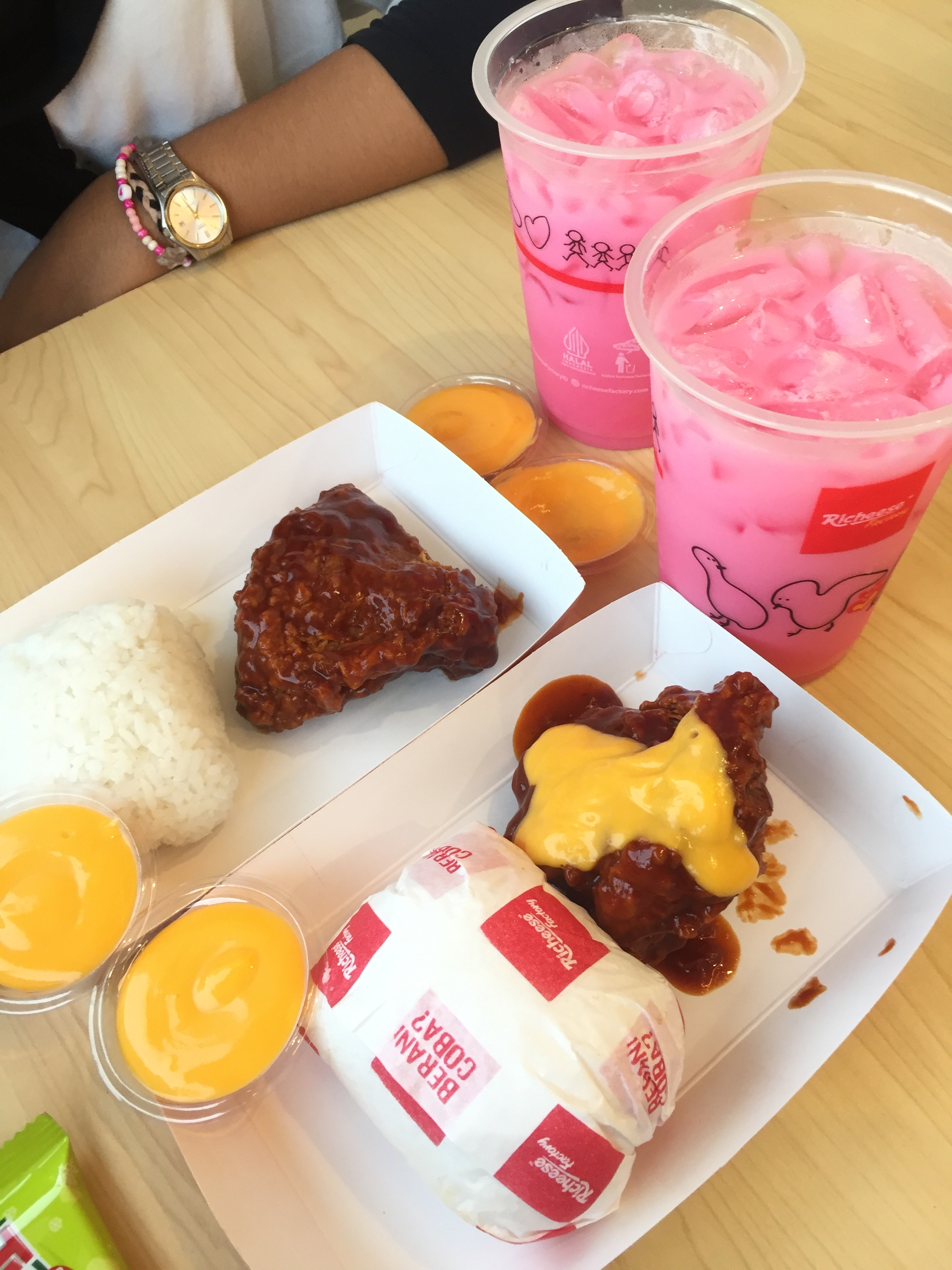
Richeese chicken with melted cheese sauce

Richeese Factory is known for its fried chicken paired with melted cheese sauce and spicy barbecue sauce in varying level of spiciness.
