= Vierra =

Vierra is a surname. Notable people with the surname include:

- Benedict M. Vierra (died 1994), American Roman Catholic priest
- Carlos Vierra (1876–1937), American painter, illustrator and photographer
- Feliciano Vierra Tavares (1920–2008), American musician and singer
- Ryan Vierra (born 1968), American Highland games competitor
