= Jalan Terbaik =

Studio album by ST 12
- Released: 18 January 2005 (Indonesia); 15 May 2006 (Malaysia)
- Recorded: 2004–2005
- Genre: Pop; slow rock; acoustic; rock
- Label: Trinity Optima Production
- Producer: Hendry Helmy

ST 12 chronology
Jalan Terbaik (2006)	Cari Pacar Lagi EP (2007)

Singles from Jalan Terbaik
- 1. "Aku Tak Sanggup Lagi" Released: October 1, 2005; 2. "Rasa Yang Tertinggal" Released: November 2005; 3. "Aku Masih Sayang" Released: October 2006

Jalan Terbaik is the debut album Indonesia band ST 12, released on January 18, 2005. The album contains 10 songs, including the singles "Aku Tak Sanggup Lagi", "Rasa Yang Tertinggal", and "Aku Masih Sayang". This was the only album by the band that included the work of guitarist Iman Rush, who was killed in a traffic accident in October 2005.

== Track listing ==
1. ATSL (Aku Tak Sanggup Lagi)
2. Rasa Yang Tertinggal
3. Ruang Hidup
4. Aku Masih Sayang
5. Kepedihan Jiwa
6. Cinta Abadi
7. Sirna Sudah
8. Dewiku
9. Jiwa Yang Hilang
10. Jalan Terbaik

== Personnel ==
Credits for Jalan Terbaik adapted from album liner notes.

- Charly van Houten – vocal (all tracks)
- Pepeng – rhythm guitar (all tracks)
- Iman Rush – lead guitar (all tracks)
- Pepep – drum, recorded (all tracks except "Cinta Abadi")
- Iman Gaia – keyboard
- Arista – backing vocal
- Indra Utopia – bass guitar
- Andry Mandera – mixed & mastered
- Openg – recorded
- ST 12 – songwriter & arrangement
- Hendry Helmy – producer
- Helmy Aziz – executive producer

== Trivia ==
- Iman Rush really involved in the cultivation album and overall recording sessions
- Pepep only be played rhythm guitar in throughout the song
- Actually, all of the songs on this album is the result of Iman Rush's arrangement itself, not the results of other personnel arrangement
- Pepep appointed to Andry Mandera as a studio engineer during recording and mixing
- The album was produced by Hendy Helmy, Pepep's brother
- Distribution of albums funded by (alm) Helmy Aziz, Pepep's father
- Charly awkward for the first time entered the studio to work on the first track
- The album become popular in once year after since the death of Iman Rush
- The video clip "Aku Tak Sanggup Lagi (ATSL)" in the 3 months to shooting before the death of Iman Rush
