= Kerispatih =

Indonesian boyband

- Stylized logo of Kerispatih

Background information
- Genres: Pop
- Years active: 2003–present
- Labels: Nagaswara
- Members: Fandy Santoso; Arief Nurdiansyah Morada; Anton Suryo Kusumo
- Past members: Hendra Samuel Simorangkir; Doadibadai Hollo; Andika Putrasahadewa

Kerispatih is an Indonesian pop boy band founded in 2003. They have released five albums, with three going platinum.

== History ==
=== Early years ===
Kerispatih was formed on 22 April 2003. They started by playing ethnic Indonesian music, releasing their first album, Gulalikustik, in 2004. After being approached and signed by the record label Nagaswara, they switched to pop as it was more commercially viable.

Their first album with Nagaswara, Kejujuran Hati (lit. 'The Heart's Honesty'), was released in 2005 and went platinum; three songs from the album, "Kejujuran Hati", "Cinta Putih" (lit. 'White Love') and "Lagu Rindu" ("Song of Longing"), were released as singles. In 2007, they released a second album, Kenyataan Perasaan (lit. 'The Truth of the Feelings'), with the songs "Mengenangmu" (lit. 'Remembering You'), "Tapi Bukan Aku" (lit. 'But Not Me'), "Sepanjang Usia" (lit. 'For All of My Lives') and "Untuk Pertama Kali" (lit. 'For the First Time') as singles; this album also went platinum. That same year, Kerispatih also sang "Kawan" (lit. 'Friend') for the compilation album Rinduku Padamu (lit. 'My Longing For You'), written by President of Indonesia Susilo Bambang Yudhoyono; the album sold 40,000 copies.

Another platinum certified album, Tak Lekang Oleh Waktu (lit. 'Unbridled by Time') was released in 2008, with singer Syahrini as a guest vocalist. The album also featured "Kawanku" (lit. 'My Friend') written by President Yudhyono. Selling 25,000 copies in a short period of time, two of its songs were released as singles, "Bila Rasaku Ini Rasamu" (lit. 'If My Feeling is Yours') and "Demi Cinta" (lit. 'For the Sake of Love'). This was followed with the 2009 album titled Semua Tentang Cinta (lit. 'All About Love'), which had one single.

=== 2016–present: Line-up changes ===
The band's original line-up consisted of vocalist Hendra Samuel Simorangkir, keyboardist Doadibadai Hollo (Badai), guitarist Arief Nurdiansyah Morada, drummer M. Anton Suryo Sularjo Wahyu Nugroho Kusumo, and bassist Andika Putrasahadewa. After Simorangkir was arrested and convicted of possession of crystal meth in 2010, he was fired from the group and replaced by Fandy Santoso, a finalist in the fourth season of Indonesian Idol.

On 24 May 2016, Badai left the group to pursue a solo career. He formed a three-member boy group named Badai Romantic Project the following year in 2017.

On 10 April 2018, bassist Putrashadewa died of stroke, having been previously admitted to the hospital after collapsing.

== Musical style ==
According to Kerispatih, their lyrics are based on real life situations and experiences.

== Discography ==
- Gulalikustik (2004)
- Kejujuran Hati (lit. 'The Heart's Honesty'; 2005)
- Kenyataan Perasaan (lit. 'The Truth of the Feelings'; 2007)
- Tak Lekang Oleh Waktu (lit. 'Unbrindled by Time'; 2008)
- Semua Tentang Cinta (lit. 'Everything About Love'; 2009)
- Melekat di Jiwa (lit. 'Inherent In Life'; 2012)

== Band members ==
=== Current members ===
- Fandy Santoso – lead vocals (2010–present)
- Arief Morada – guitars (2003–present); bass (2018–present)
- Anton Suryo Kusumo – drums (2003–present)

=== Former members ===
- Sammy Simorangkir – lead vocals (2003–2010)
- Badai (Doadibadai Hollo) – keyboards, backing vocals (2003–2016)
- Andika Putrasahadewa – bass, backing vocals (2003–2018; died 2018)
