= ST 12 =

Indonesian musical group

ST12
- Origin: Bandung, West Java, Indonesia
- Genres: Indo pop, Indo rock
- Years active: 2004–present
- Labels: Trinity Optima Production (2005-2011); Universal Music Indonesia (2012-present)
- Members: Ilham Febry; M. Indra Gunawan
- Past members: Iman Rush (deceased); Charly Van Houtten; Dedy Sudrajat; Rido Tuah; Koko; Firman Siagian
- Website: ST12 Official website

ST12 is an Indonesian band formed in Bandung, West Java, in 20 January 2004. The group was formed by Ilham Febry, a.k.a. Pepep (drummer), Dedy Sudrajat, alias Pepeng (guitarist), Charly van Houten, a.k.a. Charly (vocalist), and Iman Rush (guitarist). ST12 stands for Jl. Stasiun Timur No. 12, which was the band's headquarter. As of 2010, ST12 had produced five albums.

== History ==
ST12 was officially formed on January 20, 2004, although its members had long been in the music world. Earlier, they were not known to each other. They often met in the rental studio on Jl. Stasiun Timur No. 12, near Bandung railway station. The band was named by Pepep's father, Helmi Aziz. Charly liked jazz, Pepep liked jazz and rock, while Pepeng grew up with rock music. After failing to get a recording contract, ST12 went indie (independent). Their debut album, Jalan Terbaik, was released in 2006. During the promotional tour in Semarang, Iman Rush died after a brain hemorrhage in October 2005.

The success of their debut album ST12 caught the attention of Trinity Optima Production. ST12 also released a second album P.U.S.P.A(2008) in tribute to Iman Rush.

In 2012, Indonesian division of Universal Music Group has reformed ST12 by joining the two new members, Rido Tuah and Koko, as Charly and Pepeng's replacement. In 2014, Dimas Moersas has joined the group as Rido Tuah and Koko's replacement.

== Discography ==
Distributed by Trinity Optima Production:

- Jalan Terbaik (2005)
- P.U.S.P.A (2008)
- P.U.S.P.A Repackage (2009)
- Pangeran Cinta (2010)

Distributed by Universal Music Indonesia:

- Lentera Hati (2013)
- Terjemahan Hati (2014)
