= Sandhy Sondoro =

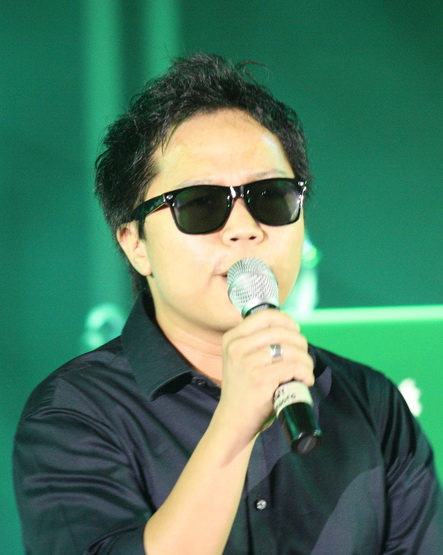
- Sandhy Sondoro at Surabaya Urban Jazz Cross Over 2010, Indonesia.

Background information
- Born: Sandhy Soendhoro; 12 December 1973 (age 52); Jakarta, Indonesia
- Origin: Jakarta, Indonesia
- Genres: Ocean Kung Fu Soul Blues
- Occupations: Singer-songwriter, musician
- Instruments: Guitar, vocals
- Years active: 1998–present
- Label: Sony Music Indonesia Best Beat Music JMSI
- Website: sondoromusic.com myspace.com/sandhysondoro

Sandhy Soendhoro, better known by his stage name Sandhy Sondoro, sometimes stylized as Sandhy SonDoro, (born 12 December 1973) is an Indonesian singer-songwriter. He is best known for winning the 2009 International Contest of Young Pop Singer New Wave, in Jūrmala, Latvia.

== Early life ==
Sandhy was born in Jakarta, Indonesia, as Sandhy Soendhoro, to Rr. Rika Pudjihastuti and Achmad Fauzan. Sandhy is of Palembangese, Javanese, Buginese, and Minangkabau descent.

Sandhy came from a musical family, where the house provided the likes of American pop, folk, jazz, and blues tunes coming from his mother's or father's guitar every day. His cousin, Ira Maya Sopha, was a famous child singer in Indonesia during the 1970s.

After graduating from high school in Jakarta, at the age of 18, Sandhy went to visit his uncle in California and stayed there for a while, before leaving for Germany to study architecture.

== Early career ==
In Germany, he joined a band on his campus, but they rarely appeared on stage. Later, he decided to find a job, as he lived alone there and needed to support himself. He had an opportunity to work in a supermarket but didn't get the job, as he was too late. On the way back to his apartment on his bike, he saw a busker on the street and asked if he could join him. The busker agreed, and Sandhy borrowed his friend's guitar and started playing on the streets of Biberach an der Riss. They got 50 deutschemarks in an hour and shared the money. They played three times a week before he decided to do it alone.

In 1998 he moved back to Berlin and started singing and playing the guitar in bars, clubs, and metros. His famous song "Down on the Streets" was inspired by the experience gained in Berlin metros. He also performed in famous theatres like the House of World Cultures in Berlin, and at music festivals such as the Bode Museum Isle Festival In 2005, Sandhy performed in a charity concert for the 2004 Indian Ocean earthquake and tsunami victims, "Berlin for Asia."

During his time in Germany Sandhy "changed" his last name from "Soendhoro" (new spelling: Sundhoro) to "Sondoro" because many people had difficulties pronouncing it. He also explained that Sondoro means "The Sound of Gold" in Latin. On his birth certificate and other official documents, his last name remains as "Soendhoro."

Sandhy found a wider audience through Stefan Raab's casting show, a popular segment within one of Germany's most successful late-night shows SSDSDSSWEMUGABRTLAD .

On 25 April 2008, he published his debut album Why Dont We, after releasing his first single "Down on the Street" earlier.

== New Wave ==
Sandhy participated in the 8th edition of New Wave, an "International Contest of Young Pop Singer" in Jūrmala, Latvia, after Brandon Stone, a music producer, suggested he take part in the competition. The 2009 New Wave ran from 28 July to 2 August 2009 and was contested by 16 singers from 12 different countries. Sandhy was the first Indonesian, and also the first Southeast Asian to participate.

On the first day of the competition, the contestants were required to sing world hits, and Sandhy sang "When a Man Loves a Woman" by Percy Sledge. He received 9 points from one of the twelve judges, while the rest gave him 10, giving him 119 points in total. Sandhy came in first place, followed by Jamala from Ukraine in the second place, who sang "History Repeating."

On the second day, the contestants were required to sing national hit songs, and Sandhy chose his song "Malam Biru" which is in Indonesian. Sandhy again received 119 points from the judges, and was still in first place with 238 points, tying with Jamala who received a perfect score on the second day of the competition.

On the third and final day, the contestants had to sing a song that is "dedicated to New Wave 2009" and Sandhy performed another song that he wrote, "End of the Rainbow." Both Sandhy and Jamala received a perfect score of 120, making them the winners of New Wave 2009 with 358 points, and were awarded €50,000 each.

== Post-New Wave ==
Sandhy started to gain fame in his home country Indonesia after videos of his performances in New Wave were uploaded to YouTube.

In 2010, he was invited by Diane Warren to perform for PBS in the Palladium Theatre, along with famous artists such as Cher, Patti Austin, Celine Dion, Toni Braxton, Eric Benet, Fantasia, LeAnn Rimes and others.

== Discography ==
=== Albums ===
- Why Don't We (2008) Released in Germany
- Sandhy Sondoro (2008) Released in Germany
- Shine (2009) Released in Germany
- New Wave 2009 Various Artist (2009) Released in Germany
- Jazz in The City (2009) Released in Indonesia
- "Gejolak Cinta" Hipnotis - Indah D. Pertiwi (2010) Released in Indonesia
- "Let's Say Love" Lovevolution - Glenn Fredly (2010) Released in Indonesia
- Diane Warren's Love Song (2010) Released in USA
- Wave Music Vol. 15 (2010) Released in Europe
- Soul Ya 3 (2010) Released in Europe
- Sandhy Sondoro (2010) Released in indonesia
- Find the way (2011) Released in Indonesia
- Wave Music Vol. 16 (2011) Released in Europe
- Wave Music Vol. 18 (2012) Released in Europe
- Vulnerability (2014) Released in Indonesia
- “Sakura” Fariz FM & Dian PP in Collaboration With (2014) Released in Indonesia
- Sandhy Sondoro's Love Songs (2016) Released in Indonesia
- Berlin! Berlin! Ick Lieb Dir So Sehr (2016) Released in Indonesia

== Awards and nominations ==
Year	Association	Category	Result
2009	New Wave	Winner of the International Contest Of Young Singers Of Popular Music	Winner
2010	Rolling Stone Indonesia	Sandhy Sondoro Pop Ambassador "Editors Choice Awards 2010"	Selected
2010	Magical Future	"10th Magical Icon" Indonesian International Musician	Selected
2011	AMI Awards	The best Solo Artist "14th AMI Awards 2011" Pop Category	Selected
2011	AMI Awards	The Best Performing Artist "14th AMI Awards 2011" Album Jazz/Jazzy	Selected
2011	AMI Awards	The Best of The Best "14 AMI Awards2011" Common Category	Selected
2011	Planet Muzic	Best Vocals " Media Corp Radio Anugerah Planet Muzic 2011" New Artist	Selected
2017	White Nights st. Petersburg	The Grand Prix Winner of " White Nights st. Petersburg 2017"	Winner
