= Indonesian Choice Award for Song of the Year =

Award at the Indonesian Choice Awards

- Country: Indonesia
- Presented by: NET.
- First award: 2014
- Final award: 2017
- Currently held by: Raisa, "Kali Kedua" (2017)
- Website: hut.netmedia.co.id

The Indonesian Choice Award for Song of the Year is an honor presented at the Indonesian Choice Awards, a ceremony that was established in 2014 and originally of trophy called the Golden Thumb Awards. Awards in several categories are distributed annually by the NET. to "honor artistic achievement, without regard to album sales or chart position." Raisa has been nominated three times and is the most winner artist for twice. This is a following list of winners and nominees:

== Winners and nominees ==
Year	Recipient	Work	Ref.
2014	Raisa	"Pemeran Utama"	
2014	Geisha	"Lumpuhkan Ingatanku"	
2014	Kotak	"Inspirasi Sahabat"	
2014	RAN	"Hari Baru"	
2014	Tulus	"Sepatu"	
2015	Sheila on 7	"Lapang Dada"	
2015	Kunto Aji	"Terlalu Lama Sendiri"	
2015	Yura Yunita featuring Glenn Fredly	"Cinta dan Rahasia"	
2015	Trio Lestari	"Gelora Cinta"	
2015	The Rain	"Gagal Bersembunyi"	
2016	Rizky Febian	"Kesempurnaan Cinta"	
2016	Isyana Sarasvati featuring Rayi Putra	"Kau Adalah"	
2016	Afgan featuring Raisa	"Percayalah"	
2016	HiVi!	"Siapkah Kau Tuk Jatuh Cinta Lagi"	
2016	Gamaliel Audrey Cantika	"Bahagia"	
2017	Raisa	"Kali Kedua"	
2017	Anji	"Dia"	
2017	Dipha Barus featuring Kallula	"No One Can Stop Us"	
2017	Rizky Febian	"Penantian Berharga"	
2017	Tulus	"Ruang Sendiri"	
2018	Sheila on 7	"Film Favorit"	
2018	Payung Teduh	"Akad"	
2018	Isyana Sarasvati & Raisa	"Anganku Anganmu"	
2018	Rendy Pandugo	"Silver Rain"	
2018	Fourtwnty	"Zona Nyaman"	
