= 4th Indonesian Choice Awards =

2017 entertainment awards ceremony in Indonesia

- Date: May 21, 2017
- Location: Sentul International Convention Center, Bogor, West Java
- Hosted by: Sarah Sechan; Vincent Rompies; Desta

Highlights
- Most awards: Tulus (3)
- Most nominations: Tulus (4)

Television/radio coverage
- Network: NET.

The 4th Indonesian Choice Awards ceremony (Official name: NET. 4.O presents Indonesian Choice Awards 2017), presented by the NET., honored the best entertainment of the year in 2017, and took place on May 21, 2017, at the Sentul International Convention Center in Bogor, West Java, at 7:00 p.m. WIB. During the ceremony, NET. were presented Indonesian Choice Awards in 12 categories (totally 64 nominees, including a newest category Music Video of the Year), and a Lifetime Achievement Award.

The awards ceremony aired live on NET. coinciding with the fourth anniversary celebration, entitled NET 4.0. The annual awards have presented by Sarah Sechan, Vincent Rompies and Desta (2nd time overall). The nominees for this edition of ICA were first announced on April 25, 2017, by NET. via Twitter. In addition to featured musician, NET. also featuring to international musician and artists, such as Jonas Blue, Robin Thicke and American magician Tony Chapek.

Musician songwriter Tulus received the most nominations with four and was the most biggest winner of the night for taking home three awards, followed behind by Raisa who only received two awards trophy. Other winners included GAC, who won Band/Group/Duo of the Year (for the second year running), Rich Chigga who won Breakthrough Artist of the Year, etc.

Legend musician Bimbo has receiving the "Lifetime Achievement Award" from the Chief of the Creative Economy Agency Triawan Munaf, for their contribution work during 5th decade.

== Voting system ==
Voting for 2017 Indonesian Choice Awards opened on April 26, 2017, on Twitter, for hashtag #ICA _4#<nominees_category>.

== Performers ==
Artist(s)	Song(s)
Main show
Jonas Blue; Charlie Brown	"Perfect Strangers"
Rizky Febian	"Penantian Berharga"
Robin Thicke	"The Sweetest Love" "Back Together"
Isyana Sarasvati; Raisa (on screen)	"Mimpi" "Anganku Anganmu"
Jaz	"Dari Mata"
Robin Thicke	"Lost Without U"
T-Five; Neo; Saykoji; Sweet Martabak; Me Voices	"Kau" "Borju" "Online" "Ti Di Dit" "Inikah Cinta"
Maudy Ayunda	"Can't Stop the Feeling!"
Rini Wulandari	"Langit Tanpa Batas"
Electroma	"Ada Apa Dengan Cinta?" "Galih dan Ratna"
Yura Yunita	"Intuisi"
Robin Thicke	"Blurred Lines"
Rizky Febian; Isyana Sarasvati; Maudy Ayunda	Indonesian Love Songs medley: "Cukup Sudah" "Hebat" "Andai Dia Tahu" "Cinta dan Rahasia" "Tetap Dalam Jiwa" "What Do You Mean?" "Kesempurnaan Cinta" "Serba Salah" "Cinta Kan Membawamu Kembali" "By My Side" "Lapang Dada"
Jonas Blue; Liza Owen; Charlie Brown	"Fast Car" "Mama"
Soundwave	"Terserah Boy"
Glenn Fredly; Yura Yunita	"Kisah Romantis" "Sedih Tak Berujung" "You Are My Everything"
Monostereo	Remix of "Song of the Year" nominees
Jonas Blue; Liza Owen	"By Your Side"

Non-song performances

Artist(s)	Perform
Main show
Tony Chapek	Tridimensional Magic Performance

== Presenters ==
- Ririn Dwi Ariyanti, Dimas Seto and Maria Selena – Presented Actor of the Year
- Danang and Darto – Presented Actress of the Year
- Armand Maulana – Presented Creative and Innovative Person of the Year
- Chelsea Islan and Boy William – Presented Album of the Year
- Yuliandre Darwis – Presented TV Program of the Year
- Gista Putri and Tanta Ginting – Presented Male Singer of the Year
- Temmy Rahadi and Rahma Hayuningdyah – Presented Movie of the Year
- Sule and Andre Taulany – Presented Band/Duo/Group of the Year
- Triawan Munaf – Presented Lifetime Achievement Award
- Rizky Febian and Hesty Purwadinata – Presented Breakthrough of the Year
- Niken Anjani and Ibnu Jamil – Presented Female Singer of the Year
- Shahnaz Soehartono and Ganindra Bimo – Presented Music Video of the Year
- Deva Mahenra and Kimmy Jayanti – Presented Song of the Year

== Winners and nominees ==
The full list of nominees and winners is as follows:

=== Music ===
Song of the Year	Album of the Year
"Kali Kedua", Raisa (no present); "Dia", Anji; "No One Can Stop Us", Dipha Barus featuring Kallula; "Penantian Berharga", Rizky Febian; "Ruang Sendiri", Tulus	Monokrom, Tulus; And So It Begins, Eva Celia; Handmade, Raisa; Palalopeyank, Slank; RAN, RAN
Male Singer of the Year	Female Singer of the Year
Tulus; Ari Lasso; Armand Maulana; Mondo Gascaro; Rizky Febian	Raisa (no present); Andien; Eva Celia; Jemima; Yura Yunita
Band/Group/Duo of the Year	Breakthrough Artist of the Year
GAC; Kotak; Rumah Sakit; Slank; Tika and The Dissidents	Rich Chigga; Elephant Kind; Rendy Pandugo; Ringgo 5; Teddy Adhitya
Music Video of the Year
"Monokrom", Tulus; "Dat $tick", Rich Chigga; "Mendekat Melihat Mendengar", Maliq & D'Essentials; "The House", Stars and Rabbit

=== Movie ===
Movie of the Year
Warkop DKI Reborn: Jangkrik Boss! Part 1; Ada Apa Dengan Cinta? 2; My Stupid Boss; Rudy Habibie; Surga Yang Tak Dirindukan 2
Actor of the Year	Actress of the Year
Reza Rahadian; Abimana Aryasatya; Dimas Anggara; Indro Warkop; Vino G. Bastian	Chelsea Islan; Acha Septriasa; Bunga Citra Lestari; Dian Sastrowardoyo; Laudya Cynthia Bella

=== Television ===
TV Program of the Year
- Mata Najwa
  - Hitam Putih
  - Kick Andy
  - My Trip My Adventure
  - On the Spot

=== Other ===
Creative and Innovative Person of the Year
- Raditya Dika
  - Dian Pelangi
  - Dian Sastrowardoyo
  - Chelsea Islan
  - Ernest Prakasa

Special award

Lifetime Achievement Award
- Bimbo
