= 3rd Indonesian Choice Awards =

2016 entertainment awards ceremony in Indonesia

- Date: May 29, 2016
- Location: Sentul International Convention Center, Bogor, West Java

Highlights
- Most awards: Isyana Sarasvati (2); Rizky Febian (2)
- Most nominations: Isyana Sarasvati (3)

Television/radio coverage
- Network: NET.

The 3rd Indonesian Choice Awards (Official name: NET. 3.0 presents Indonesian Choice Awards 2016) was an entertainment industry award ceremony held on 29 May 2016 at the Sentul International Convention Center in Bogor, West Java. The show was hosted by Sarah Sechan, Vincent Rompies and Desta.

Awards were presented in 11 categories. The newest category, "Creative & Innovative Person of the Year," replaced the "Digital Persona of the Year" category from the prior year. The awards ceremony aired live on NET. coinciding with the third anniversary celebration, entitled NET 3.0: #IndonesiaLebihKece.

Nominees for the 3rd Indonesian Choice Awards ceremony were first announced on 27 April 2016 by NET via Twitter. Musician Isyana Sarasvati received the most nominations with three. Isyana Sarasvati and Rizky Febian were the biggest winners of the night, both receiving two awards. Other winners included Tulus, who won "Male Singer of the Year" and GAC, who won "Band/Duo/Group of the Year".

Musician and songwriter Yovie Widianto received the special "Lifetime Achievement Award" from the Chief of the Creative Economy Agency Triawan Munaf for his consistent dedication to promoting and developing the Indonesian music industry with quality featuring a number of songs about heartbreak and romance.

== Voting system ==
Voting for the 2016 Indonesian Choice Awards opened on May 1, 2016.

== Performers ==
Artist(s)	Song(s)
Main show
Jessie J	"Bang Bang"
Rizky Febian	"Kesempurnaan Cinta"
SoundWave	"Work" "Salah"
Wizzy	"Langit Tanpa Batas"
Omi	"Cheerleader"
Raisa	"Teka Teki"
Kahitna	"Sampai Nanti" "Andai Dia Tahu" "Belahan Jiwa" "Rahasia Cintaku"
Jessie J	"Flashlight"
Just Duet' finalist	"Malam Ini Indah" "I Miss You But I Hate You"
Isyana Sarasvati; Boy William	"Tetap Dalam Jiwa" "Kau Adalah"
Omi	"Drop in the Ocean" "Hula Hoop"
Kahitna	"Cantik" "Katakan Saja" "Cerita Cinta"
Yura Yunita; Rizky Febian	"Cinta dan Rahasia"
Wildeones	"Work It" "Terbang"
GAC; Raisa	"Bahagia" "Jatuh Hati"
Jessie J	"Masterpiece" "Domino" "Price Tag"
Addie MS; Winky Wiryawan; Maia Estianty; Titi Rajo Bintang; Maruli Tampubolon; Wizzy	"Cukup Siti Nurbaya" "Sorry"
Monostereo	"Hold My Hand" "Berharap Tak Berpisah"
Dawin	"Dessert"

== Presenters ==
- Deva Mahenra and Chelsea Islan – Presented Actor of the Year
- Danang & Darto – Presented Actress of the Year
- Tanta Ginting and Sahira Anjani – Presented Movie of the Year
- Abdee Negara – Presented Creative and Innovative Person of the Year
- Lukman Sardi and Gista Putri – Presented TV Program of the Year
- Sule and Andre Taulany – Presented Breakthrough Artist of the Year
- Dwi Sasono and Sophia Latjuba – Presented Group/Band/Duo of the Year
- Ibnu Jamil and Atiqah Hasiholan – Presented Album of the Year
- Temmy Rahadi and Safira Umm – Presented Female Singer of the Year
- Marissa Anita and Zivanna Letisha – Presented Male Singer of the Year
- Triawan Munaf – Presented Lifetime Achievement Award
- Dodit Mulyanto and Hesti Purwadinata – Presented Song of the Year

== Winners and nominees ==
The full list of nominees and winners is as follows:

=== Music ===
Male Singer of the Year	Female Singer of the Year
Tulus; Once Mekel; Kunto Aji; Teza Sumendra; Mike Mohede	Isyana Sarasvati; Maudy Ayunda; Fatin; Yura; Monita Tahalea
Breakthrough of the Year	Band/Group/Duo of the Year
Rizky Febian; Barasuara; Silampukau; Polka Wars; Scaller	GAC; HiVi!; Endank Soekamti; Endah N Rhesa; RAN
Album of the Year	Song of the Year
Explore!, Isyana Sarasvati; Intersisi, Musikimia; Generation Y, Kunto Aji; Taifun, Barasuara; Sinestesia, Efek Rumah Kaca	"Kesempurnaan Cinta", Rizky Febian; "Kau Adalah", Isyana Sarasvati featuring Rayi Putra; "Percayalah", Afgan & Raisa; "Siapkah Kau Untuk Jatuh Cinta Lagi", HiVi!; "Bahagia", GAC

=== Movie ===
Movie of the Year
Filosofi Kopi; Comic 8: Casino Kings Part 1; Comic 8: Casino Kings Part 2; Surga Yang Tak Dirindukan; London Love Story
Actor of the Year	Actress of the Year
Reza Rahadian; Vino G. Bastian; Chicco Jerikho; Fedi Nuril; Raditya Dika	Chelsea Islan; Laudya Cynthia Bella; Dewi Sandra; Acha Septriasa; Prisia Nasution

=== Television ===
Television Program of the Year
- Mata Najwa
  - On The Spot
  - My Trip My Adventure
  - Hitam Putih
  - Stand Up Comedy Academy

=== Other ===
Creative & Innovative Person of the Year
- Merry Riana
  - Raditya Dika
  - Andrea Hirata
  - Christian Sugiono
  - Nadiem Makarim

Special award

Lifetime Achievement Award
- Yovie Widianto
