= Raditya =

Raditya can be both a masculine given name and a surname. Notable people with the name include:

- Raditya Dika, Indonesian author and YouTuber
- Irfan Raditya (born 1998), Indonesian football centre-back
- Kadek Raditya (born 1999), Indonesian football centre-back
- Vincent Raditya, Indonesian pilot and YouTuber
