= Sentul International Convention Center =

Commercial conference hall in West Java

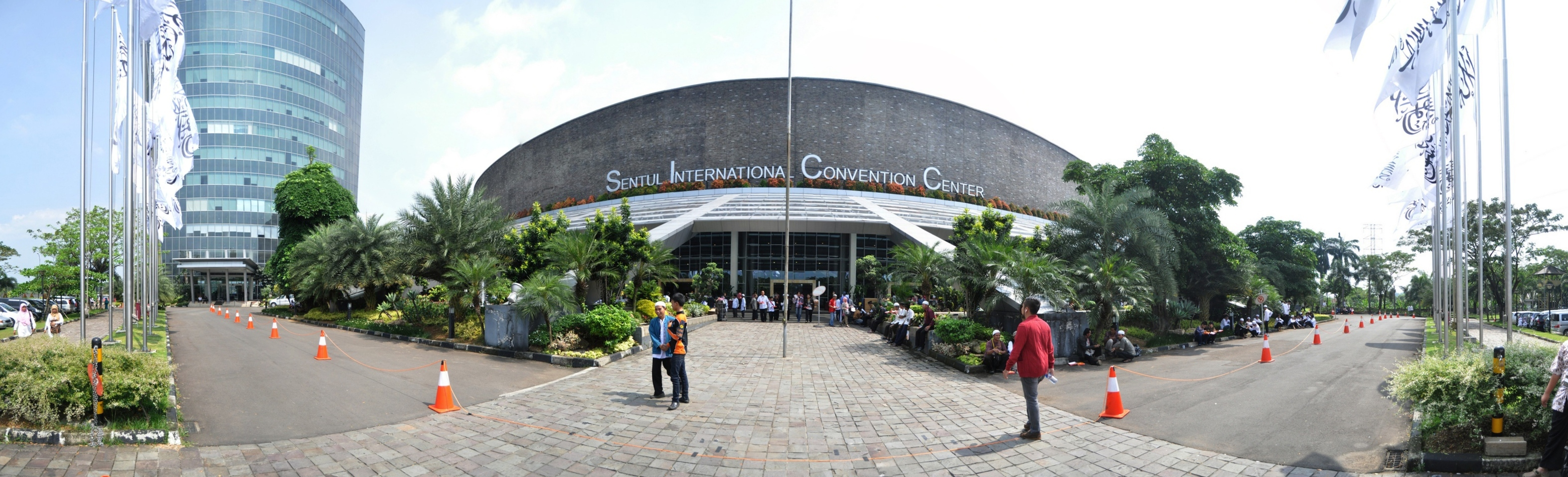
- A panoramic view of Sentul International Convention Center

- Location within Bogor Regency
- Type: Convention center
- Location: Babakan Madang, Bogor Regency, West Java, Indonesia
- Nearest city: Bogor
- Coordinates: 6.559000°S 106.848106°E
- Created: 2005
- Operator: PT. Sentul City Tbk
- Status: Open all year

Sentul International Convention Center or the SICC is a commercial conference hall in the residential area of Sentul City, Babakan Madang, Bogor Regency, West Java, right on the side of the Jagorawi highway. Initially the building was known as Bukit Sentul Convention Center (BSCC), then Sentul City Convention Center (SCCC). The Sentul International Convention Center (SICC) name has been used since May 2009.

== Facilities ==
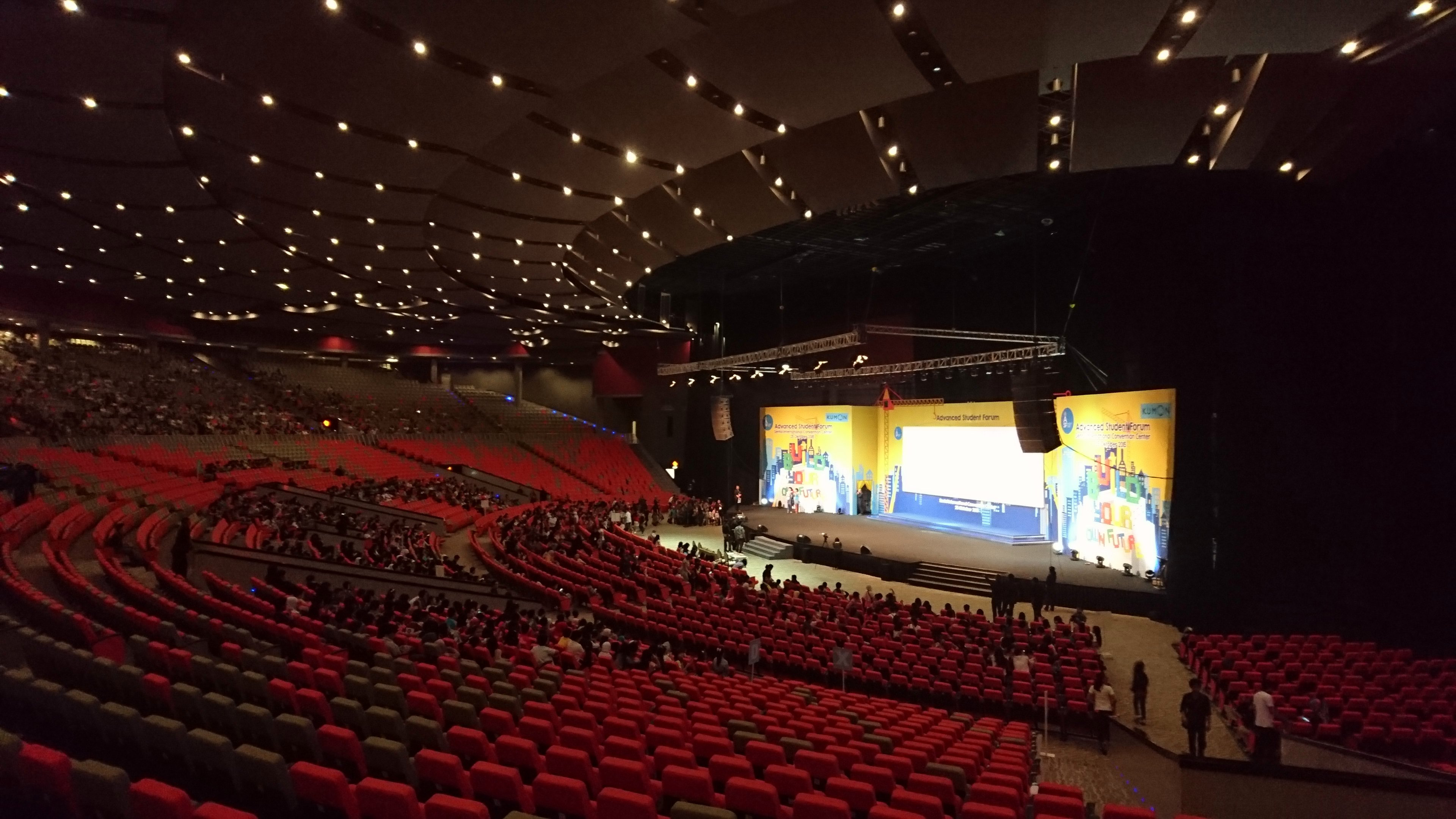
The interior of SICC

It is built on a land area of 6.4 hectares with a building area of 22,000 square meters. SICC room can accommodate 11,000 people at the main hall and 2,000 in another venue, larger than the Jakarta International Convention Center (JICC) in Jakarta. This building is a multifunctional building and hosts numerous concerts and conferences. This building is equipped with main hall, exhibition hall, meeting room, function hall, VIP & VVIP access, and parking lot.

== Notable events ==
Date	Artist/Band	Event	Attendance
8 April 2009	Jamiroquai	High Times Singles Tour	—N/a
23 April 2011	Justin Bieber	My World Tour	10,500
28 June 2011	Kylie Minogue	Aphrodite: Les Folies Tour	6,000
19 January 2012	Katy Perry	The California Dreams Tour	—N/a
8 December 2012	Shahrukh Khan	Temptation Reloaded	8,000
15 December 2013	Performers: Iwan Fals Bunga Citra Lestari Syahrini Rossa Raisa Afgan Vidi Aldiano Cakra Khan Noah Nidji D'Masiv Ungu Kotak Geisha Wali Setia Band Coboy Junior JKT48 Trio Macan Dewi Persik Inul Daratista Reza Artamevia Nicky Astria Ira Swara Zaskia Gotik Jenita Janet	12 Tahun Trans Untuk Indonesia	—N/a
29 May 2016	Performers: Jessie J OMI Dawin Rizky Febian Wizzy Raisa Kahitna Yura Yunita Isyana Sarasvati Boy William Maruli Tampubolon GAC The Remix finalists (Note: SoundWave, Wildones and Monostereo.) The Remix judges (Note: Addie MS, Winky Wiryawan, Maia Estianty and Titi Rajo Bintang.) Just Duet finalists (Note: Sara Fajira, Yeshua Abraham, Fredy Lona, Olivia Pardede and Reffi Chalif.)	3rd Indonesian Choice Awards	—N/a
21 May 2017	Performers: Robin Thicke Jonas Blue (Note: Along with Charlie Brown and Liza Owen.) Isyana Sarasvati Raisa Yura Yunita Maudy Ayunda Rizky Febian Jaz Glenn Fredly T-Five Saykoji Sweet Martabak Neo Evan Virgan The Remix finalists (Note: SoundWave, Monostereo and Electroma.) Tony Chapek	4th Indonesian Choice Awards	—N/a
29 April 2018	Performers: Craig David Hailee Steinfeld Isyana Sarasvati Raisa Tulus Anji Glenn Fredly GAC Via Vallen Boy William Rini Wulandari Reza Artamevia Sheryl Sheinafia Rizky Febian Chandra Liow Candil Sheila On 7 SHOUT! Light Balance	5th Indonesian Choice Awards	—N/a
7 July 2018	Celine Dion	Celine Dion Live 2018	8,248
19 November 2018	Performers: Blackpink Via Vallen Rizky Febian GAC Bunga Citra Lestari	Road to 12.12 Shopee Birthday Sale	—N/a
8 October 2019	Shawn Mendes	Shawn Mendes: The Tour	9,932
24 September 2022	Westlife	The Wild Dreams Tour	TBA
25 October 2022	Performers: Rossa Fabio Asher Vierratale	Miss Grand International 2022	8,000
12 August 2023	David Foster	HITMAN Asia Tour 2023	TBA
27 July 2024	Eric Chou	Odyssey~Journey World Tour	TBA
07 September 2024	Kim Soo Hyun	Eyes On You Asia Tour	TBA
10 May 2025	Wakin Chau	The Younger Me Tour	TBA
