= List of awards and nominations received by Raisa Andriana =

Raisa Andriana awards and nominations
Awards and nominations
| Award | Wins | Nominations |
| 100% Ampuh Awards | 0 | 1 |
| Anugerah Musik Indonesia | 17 | 30 |
| Anugerah Planet Muzik | 5 | 17 |
| Dahsyatnya Awards | 3 | 16 |
| Hai Reader's Poll Music Awards | 2 | 2 |
| Indonesian Choice Awards | 6 | 9 |
| Mnet Asian Music Awards | 2 | 2 |
| Nickelodeon Indonesia Kids' Choice Awards | 1 | 3 |
| SCTV Awards | 0 | 4 |
| SCTV Music Awards | 4 | 14 |
| World Music Awards | 0 | 4 |
| Yahoo! OMG Awards | 2 | 3 |

Totals (Note: Certain award groups do not simply award one winner. They acknowledge several different recipients, have runners-up, and have third place. Since this is a specific recognition and is different from losing an award, runner-up mentions are considered wins in this award tally. For simplification and to avoid errors, each award in this list has been presumed to have had a prior nomination.)
- Wins: 53
- Nominations: 156

Raisa Andriana is an Indonesian singer. She received many awards, including 12 Anugerah Musik Indonesia, 5 Indonesian Choice Awards, and 2 Yahoo! OMG Awards. And she also received international awards, including 5 Anugerah Planet Muzik and 1 Mnet Asian Music Awards. This is list awards received by Raisa Andriana:

== 100% Ampuh Awards ==
The 100% Ampuh Awards are an awards ceremony were presented by 100% Ampuh and first established in 2013 on Global TV, to awarded for achievement artist who to be appreciated in music.

| Year | Nominee / work | Award | Result | Ref. |
|---|---|---|---|---|
| 2013 | Raisa | Best Solo Singer | Nominated | |

== Anugerah Musik Indonesia ==
The Anugerah Musik Indonesia (English translation: Indonesian Music Awards) is an annual Indonesian major music award. They have been compared to the American Grammy Awards and British Brit Awards. The award was formalized in 1997 by ASIRI (Association of Indonesia Recording Industry), PAPPRI (Association of Indonesian Singers, Songwriters and Music Record Producers), and KCI (Copyright Office of Indonesia). It is the highest music award given to outstanding artists in Indonesia. Raisa received 13 awards from 26 nominations.

| Year | Nominee / work | Award | Result | Ref. |
|---|---|---|---|---|
| 2012 | Raisa | Best of the Best Newcomer | Won | |
| 2012 | "Apalah (Arti Menunggu)" | Best Pop Female Solo Artist | Nominated | |
| 2014 | "Pemeran Utama" | Best Pop Female Solo Artist | Nominated | |
| 2014 | Heart To Heart | Best of the Best Album | Nominated | |
| 2014 | Heart To Heart | Best Pop/Urban Album | Nominated | |
| 2014 | "Bye-Bye" | Best R&B/Soul Production Work | Won | |
| 2016 | "Kali Kedua" | Best Pop Female Solo Artist | Won | |
| 2016 | "Kali Kedua" | Best of the Best Production Work | Won | |
| 2016 | "Percayalah" (with Afgan) | Best Pop Collaboration | Won | |
| 2016 | "Percayalah" (with Afgan) | Best Collaboration Production Work | Won | |
| 2016 | Handmade | Best of the Best Album | Won | |
| 2016 | Handmade | Best Pop Album | Won | |
| 2017 | "Anganku Anganmu" (with Isyana Sarasvati) | Best of the Best Production Work | Nominated | |
| 2017 | "Anganku Anganmu" (with Isyana Sarasvati) | Best Soul/R&B/Urban Group/Collaboration Artist | Won | |
| 2017 | "Anganku Anganmu" (with Isyana Sarasvati) | Best Collaboration Production Work | Won | |
| 2018 | "Teduhnya Wanita" | Best of the Best Production Work | Nominated | |
| 2018 | "Teduhnya Wanita" | Best Original Soundtrack | Won | |
| 2018 | "Teduhnya Wanita" (with Haris Pranowo, Marco Steffiano & Rayendra Sunito) | Best Pop Songwriter | Nominated | |
| 2018 | "Lagu Untukmu" | Best Pop Female Solo Artist | Nominated | |
| 2019 | "My Kind of Crazy" (bersama Dipha Barus) | Best R&B Duo/Group/Vocal/Collaboration | Won | |
| 2019 | "My Kind of Crazy" (bersama Dipha Barus) | Best Collaboration Production Work | Nominated | |
| 2020 | "Teristimewa" | Best Pop Female Solo Artist | Won | |
| 2020 | "Teristimewa" (with Haris Pranowo & Marco Steffiano) | Best Pop Songwriter | Nominated | |
| 2020 | "You" | Best Soul/R&B Female/Male Artist | Nominated | |
| 2021 | "Bahasa Kalbu" (with Andi Rianto) | Best of the Best Production Work | Won | |
| 2021 | "Bahasa Kalbu" (with Andi Rianto) | Best Collaboration Production Work | Nominated | |
| 2021 | "Bahasa Kalbu" (with Andi Rianto) | Best Re-Arrange Production Work | Won | |
| 2021 | It's Personal | Best of the Best Album | Won | |
| 2021 | It's Personal | Best Pop Album | Nominated | |
| 2021 | "Tentang Dirimu" | Best Pop Female Solo Artist | Won | |

== Anugerah Planet Muzik ==
The Anugerah Planet Muzik (English translation: Planet Music Awards), is an annual award given to the most popular artists from Indonesia, Singapore, and Malaysia. Raisa received five awards from seventeen nominations.

| Year | Nominee / work | Award | Result | Ref. |
|---|---|---|---|---|
| 2012 | "Serba Salah" | Best Vocal Performance in a Song (New Female Artist) | Won | |
| 2014 | "Pemeran Utama" | Best Song (Indonesia) | Nominated | |
| 2014 | Raisa | APM Most Popular Artist | Nominated | |
| 2014 | "Mantan Terindah" | Best Artist (Female) | Nominated | |
| 2014 | "Mantan Terindah" | APM Most Popular Song | Nominated | |
| 2015 | "Jatuh Hati" | Best Artist (Female) | Won | |
| 2015 | Raisa | APM Most Popular Artist | Nominated | |
| 2016 | Raisa | APM Most Popular Artist | Nominated | |
| 2016 | Raisa | Social Media Icon | Nominated | |
| 2016 | "Kali Kedua" | Best Artist (Female) | Won | |
| 2016 | "Percayalah" (feat. Afgan) | Best Duo/Group | Won | |
| 2017 | "Anganku Anganmu" (feat. Isyana Sarasvati) | Best Duo/Group | Nominated | |
| 2017 | "Anganku Anganmu" (feat. Isyana Sarasvati) | Best Song (Indonesia) | Won | |
| 2017 | "Anganku Anganmu" (feat. Isyana Sarasvati) | APM Most Popular Song | Nominated | |
| 2017 | "Tentang Cinta" | Best Artist (Female) | Nominated | |
| 2017 | Raisa | Social Media Icon | Nominated | |
| 2017 | Raisa | APM Most Popular Artist | Nominated | |

== Ardan Group Awards ==
The Ardan Group Awards are an awards were presented by Ardan Group, to honour for musician who has the highest airplay in a year in four radio namely, Ardan Radio, Radio B, Radio Cakra and Solo Radio. Raisa has received one award.

| Year | Nominee / work | Award | Result | Ref. |
|---|---|---|---|---|
| 2013 | Raisa (6205 times play in a year) | Most Widely Played Song | Won | |

== Bintang RPTI Awards ==
| Year | Nominee / work | Award | Result | Ref. |
|---|---|---|---|---|
| 2014 | Raisa | Favorite Star Advertisement | Nominated | — |

Raisa

== Brand Ambassador Awards ==
The Brand Ambassador Awards are an annual awards ceremony were presented by Lazada and has first established in 2017, based on implemented through a distributed poll on Instagram.

| Year | Nominee / work | Award | Result | Ref. |
|---|---|---|---|---|
| 2017 | Raisa from Pond's | Favorite Brand Ambassador | Nominated | |

== Bright Awards ==
First established in 2016, the Bright Awards is an annual awards presented by MNC Media to honour for artist in Indonesian television advertising. The awards show has teamed up with MNC Media and Unity of Indonesian Advertising Companies.

| Year | Nominee / work | Award | Result | Ref. |
|---|---|---|---|---|
| 2016 | Raisa | Favorite Female Star Advertisement | Nominated | |
| 2017 | Raisa | Favorite Female Star Advertisement | Nominated | |

== Cornetto Pop Awards ==
The Cornetto Pop Awards are an annual awards were presented by brand Cornetto, to honour for talent musician in achievement music work. Raisa received two awards from 4 nominations.

| Year | Nominee / work | Award | Result | Ref. |
|---|---|---|---|---|
| 2017 | Raisa | Favorite Pop Female Singer | Won | |
| 2017 | "Anganku Anganmu" (feat. Isyana Sarasvati) | Favorite Pop Song Collaboration | Won | |
| 2017 | "Anganku Anganmu" (feat. Isyana Sarasvati) | Best Pop Music Video | Nominated | |
| 2017 | "Kali Kedua" | Best Pop Love Song | Nominated | |

== Dahsyatnya Awards ==
First established in 2009, the Dahsyatnya Awards are an annual awards presented by the daily Indonesian TV show Dahsyat, to honour for musician who to be outstanding in music and entertainment. Raisa received three awards from 16 nominations.

| Year | Nominee / work | Award | Result | Ref. |
|---|---|---|---|---|
| 2012 | Raisa | Outstanding Narcissistic | Nominated | |
| 2013 | Raisa | Outstanding Female Solo Singer | Nominated | |
| 2014 | Raisa | Outstanding Female Solo Singer | Nominated | |
| 2015 | Raisa | Outstanding Female Solo Singer | Nominated | |
| 2015 | "LDR" | Outstanding Song | Nominated | |
| 2016 | "Jatuh Hati" | Outstanding Song | Nominated | |
| 2016 | "Percayalah" (with Afgan) | Outstanding Duet/Collaboration | Won | |
| 2016 | Raisa | Outstanding Female Solo Singer | Nominated | |
| 2017 | Raisa | Outstanding Female Solo Singer | Nominated | |
| 2017 | "Kali Kedua" | Outstanding Song | Nominated | |
| 2017 | "Kali Kedua" | Outstanding Video Clip | Nominated | |
| 2017 | "Kali Kedua" | Outstanding Video Clip Director | Nominated | |
| 2018 | Raisa | Outstanding Female Solo Singer | Won | |
| 2018 | "Anganku Anganmu" (with Isyana Sarasvati) | Outstanding Duet/Collaboration | Won | |
| 2018 | "Anganku Anganmu" (with Isyana Sarasvati) | Outstanding Song | Nominated | |
| 2018 | "Usai Disini" | Outstanding Video Clip | Nominated | |

== Gadis Awards ==
The Gadis Awards are an awards ceremony were presented by magazine Gadis to honour for celebrity, figures, institutions, etc. in entertainment. Raisa has received one award.

| Year | Nominee / work | Award | Result | Ref. |
|---|---|---|---|---|
| 2015 | Raisa | Most Buzzed Artist | Won | |

== Global Seru Awards ==
The Global Seru Awards are awarded to celebrities who have caught the attention of the public through interesting or exciting accomplishments.

| Year | Nominee / work | Award | Result | Ref. |
|---|---|---|---|---|
| 2015 | Raisa | Most Exciting Hit | Nominated | |

== Grazia Glitz & Glam Awards ==
The Grazia Glitz & Glam Awards are an off-air awards ceremony were presented by magazine Grazia, to honour for celebrity in fashion and entertainment. Raisa has received one award.

| Year | Nominee / work | Award | Result | Ref. |
|---|---|---|---|---|
| 2012 | Raisa | Most Coolest Hair | Won | |

== Hai Reader's Poll Music Awards ==
Created by Indonesian magazine Hai on 2008, the Hai Reader's Poll Music Awards are an awards to honour for talent in music, based on voted by fans in websites. Raisa received two awards.

| Year | Nominee / work | Award | Result | Ref. |
|---|---|---|---|---|
| 2013 | Raisa | The Best Female | Won | |
| 2015 | Raisa: Live in Concert | The Best Concert | Won | |

== Inbox Awards ==
The Inbox Awards are an annual awards were presented by Inbox and SCTV, which recognizes appreciated in music and entertainment.

| Year | Nominee / work | Award | Result | Ref. |
|---|---|---|---|---|
| 2012 | "Apalah (Arti Menunggu)" | Most Inbox Video Clip | Nominated | |
| 2012 | Raisa | Most Inbox Newcomer | Nominated | |
| 2012 | Raisa | Most Inbox Female Solo Singer | Nominated | |
| 2014 | Raisa | Most Inbox Female Solo Singer | Nominated | |
| 2015 | Raisa | Most Inbox Female Solo Singer | Nominated | |
| 2015 | Raisa | Most Inbox Darling Social Media Artist | Nominated | |
| 2016 | Raisa | Most Inbox Female Solo Singer | Nominated | |

== Indonesian Box Office Movie Awards ==
The Indonesian Box Office Movie Awards (shortly IBOMA) are an awards ceremony were honored for 10 films which regarded as the best-selling movie and earned a lot of viewers when aired in theaters.

| Year | Nominee / work | Award | Result | Ref. |
|---|---|---|---|---|
| 2017 | "Percayalah" (for London Love Story) | Best Original Soundtrack | Nominated | |

== Indonesian Choice Awards ==
First established in 2014, the Indonesian Choice Awards are an annual awards were presented by the Indonesian television station NET., which recognize for quality talent in music and entertainment. Raisa received five awards from 9 nominations.

| Year | Nominee / work | Award | Result | Ref. |
|---|---|---|---|---|
| 2014 | Raisa | Female Singer of the Year | Won | |
| 2014 | Heart to Heart | Album of the Year | Won | |
| 2014 | "Pemeran Utama" | Song of the Year | Won | |
| 2016 | "Percayalah" (with Afgan) | Song of the Year | Nominated | |
| 2017 | "Kali Kedua" | Song of the Year | Won | |
| 2017 | Handmade | Album of the Year | Nominated | |
| 2017 | Raisa | Female Singer of the Year | Won | |
| 2018 | Raisa | Female Singer of the Year | Won | |
| 2018 | "Anganku, Anganmu" (with Isyana Sarasvati) | Song of the Year | Nominated | |

== Indonesian Social Media Awards ==
The Indonesian Social Media Awards were first presented on 2016 by SCTV to honour the celebrity who had become a trending topic in social media. Raisa has received one award from 4 nominations.

| Year | Nominee / work | Award | Result | Ref. |
|---|---|---|---|---|
| 2016 | Raisa | Female Celeb Instagram | Nominated | |
| 2016 | Raisa | Female Celeb Facebook | Nominated | |
| 2016 | Raisa | Female Celeb Twitter | Nominated | |
| 2016 | Raisa | Female Celeb Snapchat | Won | |

== Indonesian Television Awards ==
The Indonesian Television Awards are awarded to honour for talent in entertainment and program television, based on social media voting, such as Twitter and Facebook. It was first aired in 2016 on RCTI. Raisa received one award.

| Year | Nominee / work | Award | Result | Ref. |
|---|---|---|---|---|
| 2016 | Raisa | Most Popular Singer | Won | |

== Infotainment Awards ==
The Infotainment Awards are an awards ceremonies were presented by SCTV since 2012, for celebrity who recognized appreciation of the work, achievements and inspire in entertainment. Raisa received two awards from 10 nominations.

| Year | Nominee / work | Award | Result | Ref. |
|---|---|---|---|---|
| 2014 | Raisa | Most Lure Female Celebrity | Won | |
| 2015 | Raisa | Most Lure Female Celebrity | Won | |
| 2015 | Raisa | Most Awaited Celebrity Appearance | Nominated | |
| 2016 | Raisa | Most Fashionable Female Celebrity | Nominated | |
| 2016 | Raisa | Most Lure Female Celebrity | Nominated | |
| 2016 | Raisa | Most Awaited Celebrity Appearance | Nominated | |
| 2016 | Raisa | Celebrity of the Year | Nominated | |
| 2017 | Raisa | Celebrity of the Year | Nominated | |
| 2017 | Raisa | Most Awaited Celebrity Appearance | Nominated | |
| 2017 | Raisa | Most Lure Female Celebrity | Nominated | |

== Insert Awards ==
The Insert Awards are an awards ceremony presented by program Insert, to awarded for celebrities in entertainment. Raisa has received one award.

| Year | Nominee / work | Award | Result | Ref. |
|---|---|---|---|---|
| 2017 | Raisa & Hamish Daud | Most Favorite Couple Celebrity | Won | |

== Instagram Awards ==
| Year | Nominee / work | Award | Result | Ref. |
|---|---|---|---|---|
| 2017 | Raisa | Top Post Award | Won | |

== KLIK! Awards ==
The KLIK! Awards was an awards ceremony were established in 2011 and presented by program KLIK!, to honour for artist and clip makers in music.

| Year | Nominee / work | Award | Result | Ref. |
|---|---|---|---|---|
| 2011 | "Serba Salah" | Best Newcomer Music Video | Nominated | |
| 2013 | "Could It Be" | Favorite Idea Video Clip | Nominated | |

== JawaPos.com Group Awards ==
The JawaPos.com Group Awards was an online awards have first established in 2017 by newspaper Jawa Pos, to honour for public figure in music, film and entertainment. Raisa has received one award from 2 nominations.

| Year | Nominee / work | Award | Result | Ref. |
|---|---|---|---|---|
| 2016 | Raisa | Best Female Singer | Won | |
| 2017 | Raisa | Favorite Female Singer | Nominated | |

== Maya Awards ==
The Maya Awards (Indonesian translation: Piala Maya), is an annual Indonesian film award initiated in 2012 by Indonesian online film enthusiasts, that is initiated by @FILM_Indonesia Twitter account. Nominations and awards are given to each year's best local productions.

| Year | Nominee / work | Award | Result | Ref. |
|---|---|---|---|---|
| 2013 | "Firasat" (for film Rectoverso) | Best Theme Song | Nominated | |
| 2016 | "Kali Kedua" | Best Music Video | Nominated | |

== Mom & Kids Awards ==
The Mom & Kids Awards are an awards to honour for artist in music and entertainment as inspiration to mother and kids. It is first established in 2016.

| Year | Nominee / work | Award | Result | Ref. |
|---|---|---|---|---|
| 2015 | Raisa | Favorite Female Singer | Nominated | |
| 2016 | Raisa | Favorite Idol Singer | Nominated | |

== Mnet Asian Music Awards ==
The Mnet Asian Music Awards (commonly abbreviated as MAMA) is a major annual K-pop music award from Mnet Media. Raisa has received two awards.

| Year | Nominee / work | Award | Result | Ref. |
|---|---|---|---|---|
| 2014 | Raisa | Best Asian Artist (Indonesia) | Won | |
| 2017 | Raisa & Isyana Sarasvati | Best Composer of the Year | Won | |

== MTV Europe Music Awards ==
The MTV Europe Music Awards are an awards presentation presented by MTV Europe which awards a prize to musician, both of Europe and international. It was first established in 1994 and the viewers and fans voted on the EMA's website.

| Year | Nominee / work | Award | Result | Ref. |
|---|---|---|---|---|
| 2016 | Raisa | Best Southeast Asian Act | Nominated | |

== Nickelodeon Indonesia Kids' Choice Awards ==
The Nickelodeon Indonesia Kids' Choice Awards is the Indonesian version of Nickelodeon Kids' Choice Awards, held since 2008 in Jakarta. Raisa received one award from three nominations.

| Year | Nominee / work | Award | Result | Ref. |
|---|---|---|---|---|
| 2014 | Raisa | Favorite Solo Singer | Nominated | |
| 2015 | Raisa | Favorite Singer | Won | |
| 2017 | Raisa | Favorite Singer | Nominated | |

== Oz Radio Bandung FM Awards ==
The Oz Radio Bandung FM Awards are an online radio awards were presented by OZ Radio FM, for talent musician/singer who have listed of 'friendly' in music. Raisa received one award from 7 nominations.

| Year | Nominee / work | Award | Result | Ref. |
|---|---|---|---|---|
| 2017 | Raisa | Most Friendly Female Singer | Won | |
| 2017 | YourRaisa | Most Friendly Fanbase | Nominated | |
| 2017 | "Kali Kedua" | Most Friendly Song | Nominated | |
| 2018 | "Anganku Anganmu" (with Isyana Sarasvati) | Most Friendly Song | Pending | |
| 2018 | "Anganku Anganmu" (with Isyana Sarasvati) | Most Friendly Collaboration | Pending | |
| 2018 | "Teduhnya Wanita" | Most Friendly Original Soundtrack | Pending | |
| 2018 | Raisa | Most Friendly Female Singer | Pending | |

== Pop Awards ==
Launched in 2016 on RCTI, the Pop Awards are an awards have appreciated for celebrities who to be popular and also giving inspiration for young generation.

| Year | Nominee / work | Award | Result | Ref. |
|---|---|---|---|---|
| 2016 | Raisa | Female Pop Awards | Nominated | |

== SCTV Awards ==
The SCTV Awards is an annual award were presented by the Indonesian television station SCTV for talent who recognized of appreciated in music and entertainment, based on audience votes.

| Year | Nominee / work | Award | Result | Ref. |
|---|---|---|---|---|
| 2013 | Raisa | Famous Singer | Nominated | |
| 2014 | Raisa | Famous Singer | Nominated | |
| 2015 | Raisa | Famous Singer | Nominated | |
| 2016 | Raisa | Famous Singer | Nominated | |
| 2017 | Raisa | Famous Singer | Nominated | |

== SCTV Music Awards ==
The SCTV Music Awards is an award given by Indonesian television station, SCTV, for the most popular songs, albums, and artists based on audience votes. Raisa received four awards from 14 nominations.

| Year | Nominee / work | Award | Result | Ref. |
|---|---|---|---|---|
| 2013 | Raisa | Most Famous Female Solo Singer | Nominated | |
| 2014 | Raisa | Most Famous Female Solo Singer | Nominated | |
| 2014 | "Mantan Terindah" | Most Famous Song | Nominated | |
| 2015 | Raisa | Most Famous Female Solo Singer | Nominated | |
| 2016 | Raisa | Most Famous Female Solo Singer | Won | |
| 2016 | "Jatuh Hati" | Most Famous Video Clip | Nominated | |
| 2016 | "Percayalah" (with Afgan) | Most Famous Video Clip | Nominated | |
| 2016 | "Percayalah" (with Afgan) | Most Famous Collaboration | Won | |
| 2016 | "Percayalah" (with Afgan) | Most Famous Pop Song | Nominated | |
| 2017 | "Kali Kedua" | Most Famous Pop Song | Nominated | |
| 2017 | "Anganku Anganmu" (with Isyana Sarasvati) | Most Famous Video Clip | Nominated | |
| 2017 | "Anganku Anganmu" (with Isyana Sarasvati) | Most Famous Collaboration | Won | |
| 2017 | Raisa | Most Famous Female Solo Singer | Won | |
| 2018 | Raisa | Most Famous Female Solo Singer | Nominated | |

== Seleb On News Awards ==
First established in 2016 on MNCTV, the Seleb On News Awards are awards for celebrities who were an important part of the infotainment program, Seleb On News.

| Year | Nominee / work | Award | Result | Ref. |
|---|---|---|---|---|
| 2016 | Raisa | Most Hits Junior Celeb | Nominated | |
| 2017 | Raisa | Most Charm Celeb | Nominated | |

== Selebrita Awards ==
The Selebrita Awards is an awards ceremony presented by the infotainment program Selebrita and Trans 7 to honour celebrities who had to be hottest and trending topic in entertainment, based on website votes.

| Year | Nominee / work | Award | Result | Ref. |
|---|---|---|---|---|
| 2015 | "LDR" | Most Celeb Song | Nominated | |
| 2016 | "Percayalah" (with Afgan) | Most Celeb Song | Nominated | |
| 2017 | "Anganku Anganmu" (with Isyana Sarasvati) | Most Celeb Song | Nominated | |

== Silet Awards ==
The Silet Awards are an awards ceremony were established in 2014 and presented by infotainment Silet, to award a celebrity who had become popular in entertainment.

| Year | Nominee / work | Award | Result | Ref. |
|---|---|---|---|---|
| 2017 | Raisa & Hamish Daud | Razored Romance | Nominated | |

== Socmed Awards ==
The Socmed Awards are an award presented to celebrities and public figure who dominated the popularity of various social media platforms such as Twitter, YouTube, Instagram, and Blogs.

| Year | Nominee / work | Award | Result | Ref. |
|---|---|---|---|---|
| 2016 | Raisa | Celeb Twit Female | Nominated | |

== World Music Awards ==
The World Music Awards is an international awards show founded in 1989 under the patronage of Albert II, Prince of Monaco and based in Monte Carlo. Awards are presented to the world's best selling artist in various categories and to the best-selling artist from each major territory. Sales figures are provided by the International Federation of the Phonographic Industry.

| Year | Nominee / work | Award | Result | Ref. |
|---|---|---|---|---|
| 2014 | Raisa | World's Best Female Artist | Nominated | |
| 2014 | Raisa | World's Best Entertainer of the Year | Nominated | |
| 2014 | Raisa | World's Best Live Act | Nominated | |
| 2014 | "Pemeran Utama" | World's Best Video | Nominated | |

== Yahoo! OMG Awards ==
First established in 2012, the Yahoo! OMG Awards are an awards ceremony were presented by Yahoo! Indonesia to appreciate celebrities in entertainment, based on fans by visiting the website. Raisa has received two awards from 3 nominations.

| Year | Nominee / work | Award | Result | Ref. |
|---|---|---|---|---|
| 2012 | Raisa | Newcomer of the Year | Nominated | |
| 2013 | Raisa | Most Wanted Female | Won | |
| 2014 | Raisa | Most Wanted Female | Won | |

== Honors Awards, Magazine and Newspapers ==
=== The Independent Critics ===
The Annual Independent Critics has presented by TC Candler and began established in 1990. It have been publishing of the world-famous of 100 Most Beautiful Faces List. Raisa has ranked #44.

| Year | Nominee / work | Award | Result | Ref. |
|---|---|---|---|---|
| 2017 | Raisa | 100 Most Beautiful Faces | #44 | |
| 2018 | Raisa | 100 Most Beautiful Faces | | |

== I Fashion Festival & The Masterpiece ==
| Year | Nominee / work | Award | Result |
|---|---|---|---|
| 2019 | Raisa | Lifestyle Awards | Won |
