= 5th Indonesian Choice Awards =

2018 entertainment awards ceremony in Indonesia

- Date: April 29, 2018
- Location: Sentul International Convention Center, Bogor, West Java
- Hosted by: Sarah Sechan; Vincent Rompies; Desta

Highlights
- Most awards: Sheila On 7 (2)
- Most nominations: Isyana Sarasvati; Rendy Pandugo

Television/radio coverage
- Network: NET.

The 5th Indonesian Choice Awards ceremony (Official name: Indonesian Choice Awards 5.0 NET.), presented by the NET., honored the best entertainment of the year in 2018, and took place on April 29, 2018, at the Sentul International Convention Center in Bogor, West Java, at 7:00 p.m. WIB.

The awards ceremony aired live on NET. coinciding with the fifth anniversary celebration, entitled NET 5.0: Upgraded. The annual awards were presented by Sarah Sechan, Vincent Rompies, and Desta (3rd time overall).

In addition to local musicians, NET. also featured international musician and artists, such as Craig David, Hailee Steinfeld, and Light Balance.

== Voting System ==
Voting for 2018 Indonesian Choice Awards opened on March 30, 2018, on Twitter for hashtag #ICA _5#<nominees_category>

== Performers ==
Artist(s)	Song(s)
Main show
Hailee Steinfeld	"Love Myself"
Light Balance	24K Magic x Five More Hours
Raisa	"Tentang Cinta"
Craig David	"Ain't Giving Up"
Glorify the Lord Ensemble; Tulus	"Manusia Kuat" "Pamit" "Ruang Sendiri
GAC	"Suara"
Hailee Steinfeld	"Most Girls" "Rock Bottom" "Let Me Go"
Sheryl Sheinafia; Rizky Febian; Chandra Liow	"Sweet Talk"
Anji; Glenn Fredly	"Dia" "Sekali Ini Saja"
Isyana Sarasvati; Gamaliel	"Terpesona"
Via Vallen; Boy William	"Sayang"
Craig David	"I Know You" "7 Days"
Reza Artamevia; GAC; Sheryl Sheinafia; Anji	"Pertama" "Inikah Cinta" "Kita" "Akad"
Glenn Fredly; Rinni Wulandari; Candil	"Marilah Kemari" "Bimbi" "Apanya Dong"
Sheila on 7	"Film Favorit"
Craig David	"Insomnia"
Shout! Light Balance	"Leaving You Sorry" "Swalla x If It Ain't Love x Get Ugly (Jason Derulo Remix)"
Hailee Steinfeld	"Starving"

== Presenters ==
- Sheryl Sheinafia and Boy William - Presented Breakthrough Artist of the Year
- Darto and Danang - Presented Band/Group/Duo of the Year
- Angel Karamoy and Panji Suryono - Presented Music Video of the Year
- Yuliandre Darwis - Presented TV Program of the Year
- Addie MS - Presented Creative & Innovative Person of the Year
- Hesti Purwadinata and Beddu - Presented Digital Persona of the Year
- Sule and Andre Taulany - Presented Instrumental Album of the Year
- Niken Anjani and Ibnu Jamil - Presented Actress of the Year
- Shahnaz Soehartono and Ganindra Bimo - Presented Album of the Year
- Vanesha Precilla and Dodit Mulyanto - Presented Actor of the Year
- Raisa and Isyana Sarasvati - Presented Male Singer of the Year
- Via Vallen and Deva Mahenra - Presented Female Singer of the Year
- Triawan Munaf - Presented Lifetime Achievement Award
- Aubry Beer and Rizky Febian - Presented Movie of the Year
- Adinda Thomas and Tanta Ginting - Presented Song of the Year
