= Bimbo (musical group) =

Indonesian pop band

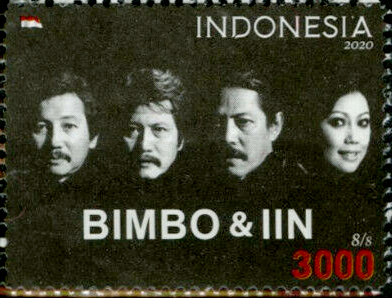
- Bimbo on a 2020 stamp of Indonesia

Background information
- Also known as: Trio Bimbo
- Origin: Bandung, West Java, Indonesia
- Years active: 1966–present
- Labels: Polydor; Remaco
- Members: Samsudin "Sam" Hardjakusumah; Jaka Purnama Hardjakusumah"; Parlina "Iin" Hardjakusumah
- Past members: Darmawan "Acil" Hardjakusumah

Bimbo, or formerly Trio Bimbo, is an Indonesian pop and religious vocal group.

== History ==
In 1967, the group performed for the first time on TVRI. The group was named Trio Bimbo by Hamid Gruno of TVRI. The trio performed Consuelo Velazquez's "Besame Mucho" and Elpido Ramirez's "Malaguenna Salerosa".

In 1969, Trio Bimbo submitted to Remaco several songs written by Iwan Abdurahman, including "Melati dari Jayagiri" ("Jasmine from Jayagiri") and "Flamboyan" ("Flamboyant"). One year later, Trio Bimbo released its debut album recorded by Polydor. The album consists of Iwan Abdurahman and Tonny Koeswoyo tunes, namely "Pinang Muda" ("Young Pinang"), "Melati dari Jayagiri", "Berpisah" ("Separating"), "Flamboyan", "Manis dan Sayang" ("Sweet and Lovely"), and "Pengembara" ("Wanderer"). The album also includes international hits such as "Light My Fire", "Once There Was A Love", "Cecilia", "El Condor Pasa" and "I Have Dreamed" and "Wichita Lineman". Trio Bimbo was helped by Maryono, a saxophonist from Surabaya. In Indonesia, the album was distributed by Remaco.

In the early 1970s, Remaco decided to release Trio Bimbo's album. The songs of the album including Iwan Abdurahman's "Balada Seorang Kelana" ("A Wanderer's Ballad") and "Angin November" ("November's Wind"), "Sunyi" ("Desolate") by A. Riyanto, and "Bunga Sedap Malam" ("The Tuberose Flower") by Koeswandi. Trio Bimbo changed its name to Bimbo in 1973, following Lin's joining the group. In this period, Bimbo added Indra Rivai on keyboards, Iwan Abdurrachman on bass guitar and Rudy Suparma on drums.

Darmawan "Acil" Hardjakusumah died on 1 September 2025, at the age of 82.

== Style ==
=== Music ===
Bimbo employed unique vocal harmonies. The members said that Queen influenced their vocal harmonies. One of Bimbo's songs "Di Atas Jembatan Semanggi" ("On the Semanggi Bridge") has a similar verse to "Bohemian Rhapsody". Rolling Stone Indonesia described Bimbo as a heavy melodic structure with wider chords. Bimbo often adopts minor keys. Asrat Ginting wrote that Bimbo uses various kind of music, from qasidah to pop, while Indonesian litterateur Ramadhan K.H. described Bimbo's music as "Mozart's music and infiltrates to the heart like Ciganjuran". (Note: Original: "... bagaikan musik Mozart dan menyusup ke jantung hati seperti Ciganjuran.") This unique style of Bimbo has reminiscent of style well-taken by Los Panchos and The Brothers Four.

=== Lyrics ===
Ginting writes that Bimbo preferred poetic lyrics. He also described Bimbo's works as "full of depth and contemplative". (Note: Original: "Penuh kedalaman dan kontemplatif.") Bimbo performed several poems including Wing Kardjo's "Kutulis Lagi" ("I Wrote Again") and "Salju" ("Snow"), Taufiq Ismail's "Oda pada Van Gogh" ("Ode to Van Gogh") and "Dengan Puisi" ("By Poetry"), and Ramadhan K.H.'s "Kehadiran" ("The Presence"). In the mid-1970s, however, Bimbo used social criticism, humor and satirical lyrics. In "Tante Sun" ("Aunty Sun") the lyrics satirize state official wives who abuse the authority.

In the 1980s, Bimbo's lyrics were more directed to international events. "Surat Untuk Reagan dan Brezhnev" ("Letters to Reagan and Brezhnev") criticizes the Cold War, "Antara Kabul dan Beirut" ("Between Kabul and Beirut") tells about conflict in the Middle East, "Balada Tuan Hue Hue" ("Mr. Hue Hue's Ballad") is about Vietnamese refugees and "Elegi Buat PBB" ("Elegy for the U.N."), is addressed to the United Nations.

Besides that, Bimbo is also popular for producing songs with Islamic religious nuances, such as "Tuhan" ("God"), "Puasa" ("The Fasts"), "Sajadah Panjang" ("A Long Laid Prayer Rug"), "Bermata Tapi Tak Melihat" ("With Eyes But Don't Want To See"), "Rindu Kami Padamu" ("Longing on You") and "Ada Anak Bertanya Pada Bapaknya" ("A Father and His Child's Questions"). These songs became associated with the month of Ramadan because they are played every year during the season by mainstream media such as television and radio.

In 2007, Bimbo released an album as a marker to its 40th anniversary. Bimbo collaborated with Taufiq Ismail in this album. One of the songs is "Jual Beli" ("Trade").
