= Indonesian Choice Awards =

Entertainment industry award

- Awarded for: Outstanding achievement in the Indonesian entertainment industry
- Country: Indonesia
- Presented by: NET.
- First award: 2014
- Final award: 2018
- Website: hut.netmedia.co.id

The Indonesian Choice Awards was an entertainment industry award given by the Indonesian television network, NET. to the artists in the world entertainment who have worked hard to win the hearts of the people of Indonesia, in conjunction with network's anniversary. Nominations were determined by a jury of people in the entertainment industry, and voting takes place by members of the public through social media. The show was first held on May 18, 2014 and held until its fifth edition in 2018.

== Location and hosts ==
Edition	Date	Venue	City	Hosts	Ref.
1st	May 18, 2014	Mata Elang International Stadium	Pademangan, North Jakarta	Sarah Sechan and Boy William	
2nd	May 24, 2015	Indonesia Convention Exhibition	South Tangerang, Banten	Sarah Sechan and David Bayu Danangjaya	
3rd	May 29, 2016	Sentul International Convention Center	Bogor, West Java	Sarah Sechan, Desta, and Vincent Rompies	
4th	May 21, 2017	Sentul International Convention Center	Bogor, West Java	Sarah Sechan, Desta, and Vincent Rompies	
5th	April 29, 2018	Sentul International Convention Center	Bogor, West Java	Sarah Sechan, Desta, and Vincent Rompies	

== Categories ==
=== Music ===
- Male Singer of the Year
- Female Singer of the Year
- Song of the Year
- Album of the Year
- Instrumental Album of The Year (2018-)
- Breakthrough Artist of the Year
- Group/Band/Duo of the Year
- Music Video of the Year (2017-)

=== Movies ===
- Movie of the Year
- Actor of the Year
- Actress of the Year

=== Television ===
- TV Program of the Year

=== Other ===
- Creative and Innovative Person of the Year (2016-)
- Digital Persona of the Year (2015)

=== Special award ===
- Lifetime Achievement Award

== Nomination process ==
Nominations are made by a committee of members of MUSISI (Society For Indonesian Music). They consist of Dhani Pette, Adib Hidayat (Rolling Stone), Frans Sartono (Kompas), Qaris Tajudin (Tempo), Gilang AR (The chairman of the association MD Indonesia), Jan. Dhuhana (senior producer), Denny MR (senior music writer), Danni Satrio (Hai), Oppie Andaresta, and Piyu.

TV programs are nominated based on their quality, not their ratings, and the show must appear on a channel other than NET. This nomination is done for award's credibility.

== See also ==
- List of Asian television awards
