= 1st Indonesian Choice Awards =

2014 entertainment awards ceremony in Indonesia

- Date: May 18, 2014
- Location: Mata Elang International Stadium, Pademangan, North Jakarta
- Hosted by: Sarah Sechan; Boy William

Highlights
- Most awards: Raisa (3)
- Most nominations: Raisa (3); Tulus (3)

Television/radio coverage
- Network: NET.

The 1st Indonesian Choice Awards (Official name: NET. ONE presents Indonesian Choice Awards 2014) was an annual awards ceremony held on May 18, 2014, at the Mata Elang International Stadium in Pademangan, North Jakarta. The show was hosted by Sarah Sechan and Boy William. This awards ceremony coincided with the first anniversary of the sponsor TV channel NET., entitled Net. ONE.

Raisa was the biggest winner of the night, with three awards for "Female Singer of the Year", "Album of the Year" for Heart to Heart, and "Song of the Year" for "Pemeran Utama". Other winners included Fatin Shidqia, who won "Breakthrough of the Year", Superman Is Dead, who won "Group/Band/Duo of the Year", Tulus, who won "Male Singer of the Year", etc.

Legend of singer-songwriter, Iwan Fals, receiving the special award "Lifetime Achievement Award" for his contribution for 35 years in the world of Indonesian music.

In addition to local musician, NET. also features international musicians and artists, such as Far East Movement, Ne-Yo and Japanese comical magician Gamarjobat.

== Voting system ==
Voting for the 2014 Indonesian Choice Awards began on April 30, 2014. Members of the public could cast their votes via Twitter or Facebook.

== Performances ==
Artist(s)	Song(s)
Main show
Far East Movement	"Like A G6"
Iwan Fals	"Bento"
Ne-Yo	"Let's Go"
Raisa; Tulus	"Apalah (Arti Menunggu)" "Pemeran Utama"
Trio Lestari; Sule; Andre Taulany	"Dara Manisku" "Nonton Bioskop" "Hip-Hip Hura" "Inikah Cinta" "J.A.P" "I Heart You"
Gigi	"Janji" "Nirwana" "Terbang" "Jomblo"
Far East Movement	"The Illest"
Noah	"Jika Engkau"
Barsena; Millane Fernandez	"I Want to Hold Your Hand" "A Hard Day's Night" "She Loves You" "Hey Jude"
Iwan Fals	"Satu Satu"
Ne-Yo	"Miss Independent"
Sheryl Sheinafia; Boy William	"The Way" "Happy"
Tulus; HiVi! Indro Warkop; Armand Maulana; Sheryl Sheinafia; Ariel Noah; Raisa	"Badai Pasti Berlalu" "Galih & Ratna" "Nyanyian Kode" "Si Boy "Persahabatan" "Suara Hati Seorang Kekasih" "Diatas Awan"
Noah	"Hidup Untukmu Mati Tanpamu"
Bunga Citra Lestari	"Clarity"
Gigi	"Ya Ya Ya" "Tak Lagi Percaya"
Tulus; RAN	"Baru" "Kulakukan Semua Untukmu" "Kita Bisa"
Bunga Citra Lestari	"Jangan Gila"
Raisa; HiVi!	"Bye-Bye" "Orang Ketiga"
Trio Lestari	Iwan Fals medley "Aku Bukan Pilihan" "Bongkar" "Sore Tugu Pancoran" "Mata Indah Bola Pingpong" "Oemar Bakrie" "Pesawat Tempur"
Ne-Yo	"Give Me Everything" "Let Me Love You (Until You Learn to Love Yourself)"
Far East Movement	"Turn Up the Love"

== Presenters ==
- Chelsea Islan and Bunga Citra Lestari – Presented Male Singer of the Year
- Deva Mahenra and Reza Rahadian – Presented Female Singer of the Year
- Marissa Anita and Armand Maulana – Presented Group/Band/Duo of the Year
- Iko Uwais and Shahnaz Soehartono – Presented Breakthrough Artist of the Year
- Ganindra Bimo and Acha Septriasa – Presented Song of the Year
- Zivanna Letisha and Rio Dewanto – Presented Album of the Year
- Lukman Sardi and Dominique Diyose – Presented TV Program of the Year
- Desta and Vincent Rhompies – Presented Actress of the Year
- Raisa and Gista Putri – Presented Actor of the Year
- Sophia Latjuba and Paula Verhoeven – Presented Movie of the Year
- Agus Lasmono – Presented Lifetime Achievement Award

== Winners and nominees ==
The full list of nominees and winners are as follows:

=== Music ===
Song of the Year	Album of the Year
"Pemeran Utama", Raisa; "Lumpuhkan Ingatanku", Geisha; "Inspirasi Sahabat", Kotak; "Hari Baru", RAN; "Sepatu", Tulus	Heart to Heart, Raisa; L1ve to Love, Love to L1ve, Afgan; Sriwedari, Maliq & D'Essentials; Love Bomb, Navicula; Gajah, Tulus
Male Singer of the Year	Female Singer of the Year
Tulus; Afgan; Cakra Khan; Judika; Marcell	Raisa; Astrid; Bunga Citra Lestari; Andien; Agnez Mo
Group/Band/Duo of the Year	Breakthrough Artist of the Year
Superman Is Dead; Endah N Rhesa; Maliq & D'Essentials; Nidji; RAN	Fatin Shidqia; Midnight Quickie; Neonomora; Sheryl Sheinafia; The Overtunes

=== Film ===
Movie of the Year
The Raid: Berandal; Tenggelamnya Kapal Van Der Wijck; Get M4rried; Soekarno; Laskar Pelangi 2: Edensor
Actor of the Year	Actress of the Year
Vino G. Bastian; Herjunot Ali; Iko Uwais; Lukman Sardi; Reza Rahadian	Pevita Pearce; Julie Estelle; Acha Septriasa; Nirina Zubir; Revalina S. Temat

=== Television ===
TV Program of the Year
- Hitam Putih
  - On The Spot
  - Kick Andy
  - Mata Najwa
  - Opera Van Java

Special award

Lifetime Achievement Award
- Iwan Fals
