= Bintang Samudera =

Indonesian action television series

- Genre: Drama; Action; Romance
- Created by: Titin Suryani
- Written by: Team Verona
- Story by: Rebecca M Bath
- Directed by: Ai Manaf
- Starring: Riza Syah; Steffi Zamora; Rebecca Tamara; Shandy William; Kamal Hafid; Ofan Yusuf; Devi Lanni; Alfian Phang; Wieshely Brown; Sonya Pandarmawan; Farahdiba Ferreira; Kenneth Santana; Johan Morgan Purba; Jerry Likumahwa; Fauzan Nasrul; Vanel anggara s; Joshua Otay; Tengku Tezi; Kenny Mayang Sari; Frans Nickolas
- Theme music composer: Rizky Febian; Bona
- Opening theme: "Hingga Tua Bersama" by Rizky Febian (Ep. 1–9); "Ku Berikan Bahuku" by Bona (Ep. 10–107)
- Ending theme: "Hingga Tua Bersama" by Rizky Febian (Ep. 1–9); "Ku Berikan Bahuku" by Bona (Ep. 10–107)
- Composer: Ary Logam
- Country of origin: Indonesia
- Original language: Indonesian
- No. of seasons: 1
- No. of episodes: 107

Production
- Executive producer: Titin Suryani
- Producer: Titin Suryani
- Production locations: Jakarta, Indonesia
- Cinematography: Mame Shulla
- Editor: Cutting Point Post
- Camera setup: Multi-camera
- Running time: 120 minutes
- Production company: Verona Pictures

Original release
- Network: ANTV
- Release: 19 September 2022 – 8 January 2023

Bintang Samudera (transl. Ocean Star) is an Indonesian action television series produced by Titin Suryani under Verona Pictures. It premiered on 19 September 2022 on ANTV. It stars Riza Syah, Steffi Zamora and Rebecca Tamara. The story revolves around life in the Indonesian Navy. The series ended on 8 January 2023 due to low ratings. The show was replaced by Philippine's show Darna from 10 January 2023.

== Plot ==
Nagita (Steffi Zamora), who was forced to break up with Bintang (Riza Syah). So that Bintang can fulfill his father's wish to become a Navy soldier and not attend medical school. Bintang was devastated and heartbroken when Nagita left him and broke their love one-sidedly through a letter.

Now Nagita is a beautiful young doctor with high dedication. After deciding to resign from his place of work, he joined the Volunteer program to Natuna. Unexpectedly when they were still on the ferry, the ship they were on was attacked by pirates. Nagita was almost taken captive by pirates but was saved by the captain of the Navy troop, and how surprised Nagita was when she saw that the person who saved her was Bintang.

Now the two are reunited and Bintang has become a different person. Bintang, a popular captain with a handsome face but stiff and cold to anyone, including Nagita. Nagita, who tries to repair her relationship with Bintang, is hindered by the presence of Andra (Rebecca Tamara), another beautiful but arrogant volunteer doctor who is obsessed with Bintang.

== Cast ==
=== Main ===
- Riza Syah as Captain Alvaro Bintang Adidarmo: Ibrahim's son; Nagita's love interest. (2022–2023)
- Steffi Zamora as Dr. Nagita Silvana Atmajaya: Vano and Larisa's step-sister; Martin's daughter; Dania's step-daughter; Bintang's love interest. (2022–2023)
- Rebecca Tamara as Dr. Andra Ramadhani: Pranoto's daughter; Bintang's obsessive lover. (2022–2023)
- Shandy William as Taufik: Kayla's husband. (2022–2023)

=== Recurring ===
- Kamal Hafid as Danu: Rahel love interest. (2022–2023)
- Ofan Yusuf as Aditya Purnomo (2022–2023)
- Alfian Phang as Dr. Kevin: Nagita's friend; Maya's love interest. (2022–2023)
- Wieshely Brown as Glenn (2022–2023)
- Farahdiba Ferreira as Maya: Kevin's love interest. (2022–2023)
- Sonya Pandarmawan as Dr. Inggit Wijaya: Nagita's best friend; Vano's ex-lover. (2022–2023)
- Jerry Likumahwa as Heru Bramana (2022–2023)
- Kathleen Carolyne as Larissa Atmajaya: Nagita's step-sister; Martin's step-daughter; Dania's daughter; Felix's love-interest. (2022–2023)
- Fadlan Muhammad as Martin Atmajaya: Dania's husband; Nagita's father; Vano and Larisa's step-father. (2022–2023)
- Devi Lanni as Dania Atmajaya: Martin's wife; Nagita's step-mother; Vano and Larisa's mother. (2022–2023)
- Krisna Murti Wibowo as Ibrahim Adidarmo: Bintang's father. (2022–2023)
- Johan Morgan Purba as Major Pranoto: Andra's father. (2022–2023)
- Fath Bayyinah as Rahel: Danu's love interest; Rudi's daughter. (2022–2023)
- Dicky Andryanto as Rudi: Rahel's father. (2022–2023)
- Arfan Afif as Felix Adika Pratama: Larisa's love-interest. (2022–2023)
- Gracia Marcilia as Kayla Permata Sari: Taufik's wife. (2022–2023)
- Erman Sendja as Hendrawan (2022–2023)
- Tengku Tezi as Adrian Darmono: Wulan's husband. (Dead) (2022–2023)
- Kenny Mayang Sari as Wulan: Adrian's wife. (2022–2023)
- Frans Nicholas as Bryan: Nagita's obsessive lover. (2022–2023)
- Uwi Jasmine as Agnes: Bintang's aunt. (2022–2023)
- Annisa as Asti: Kevin's obsessive lover. (2022–2023)
- Johannes Strauss as Mamud: The man who found the Bintang in the River. (2022)
- Joshua Otay as Alex: Rahel's obsessive lover. (2022)
- Michelle Tan as Laura: Larisa's friend. (2022)
- Fauzan Nasrul as Pasha Ganindra: Yardian's son; Nagita's obsessive lover. (Dead) (2022)
- Kenneth Santana as Vano Atmajaya: Nagita's step-brother; Martin's step-son; Dania's son; Inggit's ex-lover. (Dead) (2022)
- Thalia Rosalinda as Silvy: Danu's cousin. (2022)
- Nicky Tirta as Anton (2022)
- Maya Yuniar as Arum (2022)
- Vanel Anggara S As husein

== Production ==
=== Development and premiere ===
“ANTV together with Verona Pictures collaborated with the Indonesian Navy, which was inaugurated by signing with the Chief of the Navy, Mr. Admiral of the Indonesian Armed Forces, Yudo Margono. We are very grateful and grateful for the positive response from the Indonesian Navy and the Indonesian National Armed Forces so that this collaboration can be established.”

— Ahmad Zulfikar, President Director of ANTV

The first promo trailer of this series was released on 22 August 2022.

"Through this series, we want to introduce the life of Indonesian Navy soldiers who are not only 'hard' because of the fierce waves. We are also humans who have a sense of love and romance."

— Yudo Margono, The Chief of Naval Staff (Kasal) Admiral of the Indonesian National Armed Forces At the signing of the Cooperation Agreement (CA) between the Indonesian Navy and PT Verona Indah Pictures as the production house which was held on 29 August 2022.

The series was originally planned for the 77th Indonesian Navy Anniversary on 10 September 2022.

Before the shooting process began, the players did a deepening of the role as well as physical exercises that were trained directly from the Indonesian Navy. Not only that, they also learned to use the original weapons belonging to the Indonesian Navy and the Indonesian National Armed Forces.

"I have training for 8 days, we practice military style. This is proof that this project is not a joke, it's not a joke, because the training and filming process is accompanied by the Indonesian National Army Navy, and the scenario is also worked out with the Indonesian Navy, so For example, if there is something that does not characterize the Indonesian National Army, the Navy is immediately corrected,"

— Riza Syah.

The show was planned to air on 10 September 2022, but was changed to 19 September 2022 due to it was a form of condolences to the makers for the downing of the Indonesian Navy Aircraft G-36 Bonaza T-2503 in the Madura Strait.

=== Casting ===
Riza Syah chosen to play Captain Alvaro Bintang. Steffi Zamora chosen to play the role of Dr. Nagita. Rebecca Tamara was selected to play Dr. Andra Ramadhani. Kamal Hafid was cast to play Danu. Wieshely Brown was cast as Glenn.
