= Sinestesia =

Studio album by Efek Rumah Kaca
- Released: December 18, 2015
- Recorded: 2009–2015
- Studios: Pendulum; Black; Soundmate; Als
- Genres: Indie; alternative rock
- Length: 64:30
- Label: Jangan Marah Records
- Producers: Efek Rumah Kaca; Pandai Besi

Efek Rumah Kaca chronology
Kamar Gelap (2008)	Sinestesia (2015)

Singles from Sinestesia
- 1. "Pasar Bisa Diciptakan" Released: July 10, 2015; 2. "Biru" Released: August 10, 2015; 3. "Putih" Released: September 23, 2015

Sinestesia is the third studio album by Indonesian indie band Efek Rumah Kaca, released on December 18, 2015, on Jangan Marah Records. It was produced by Pandai Besi and the band. Recorded between 2009–15, Sinestesia is the band's first release since their 2008 album Kamar Gelap. A few days later, the album released with CD format by Demajors Independent Music Industry. All the singles were written by Cholil Mahmud.

Before releases the album, it was released the first single "Pasar Bisa Diciptakan" on July 10, to radio stations throughout Indonesia. They released the song "Biru", which consists of two songs: "Pasar Bisa Diciptakan" and "Cipta Bisa Dipasarkan" on SoundCloud. On September 18, the band held a concert, titled "Pasar Bisa Dikonserkan" at the Balai Sartika in Bandung, though it caused disappointment due to technical problems. They apologized for the incident. A few days later, they released the song "Putih", consisting of "Tiada" and "Ada", on Ripstore Asia and SoundCloud.

At the 3rd Indonesian Choice Awards, the album subsequently manage to earn a nomination for "Album of the Year", but lose out to Isyana Sarasvati's Explore!.

== Critical reception ==
Professional ratings
Review scores
Source	Rating
Rolling Stone Indonesia	4.5/5 stars

Sinestesia received generally positive reviews. Rolling Stone Indonesia gave four-and-a-half out of five stars, calling it an "ambitious work that exceeded expectations. Efek Rumah Kaca took six years to work on their third album, Sinestesia, but in the end, it exceeded expectations. All six ambitious songs presented by the trio are over 7 minutes long, displaying a richer palette of instruments, beautiful melodies and lyrics commenting on life."

== Track listing ==
No.	Title	Lyrics	Music	Length
1.	"Merah: Ilmu Politik; Lara Di Mana-mana; Ada Ada Saja"	Mahmud; Mahmud; Mahmud	Adrian Yunan Faisal; Faisal, Mahmud; Faisal, Mahmud	11:20
2.	"Biru: Pasar Bisa Diciptakan; Cipta Bisa Dipasarkan"	Faisal, Mahmud; Mahmud	Mahmud; Faisal, Mahmud, Akbar Sudibyo	9:52
3.	"Jingga: Hilang; Nyala Tak Terperi; Cahaya, Ayo Berdansa (Instrumental)"	Mahmud; Mahmud	Mahmud; Faisal; Faisal, Mahmud, Sudibyo	13:28
4.	"Hijau: Keracunan Omong Kosong; Cara Pengolahan Sampah"	Mahmud; Mahmud	Faisal, Sudibyo; Faisal	7:46
5.	"Putih: Tiada; Ada"	Faisal, Mahmud; Mahmud	Faisal, Mahmud; Faisal, Mahmud, Sudibyo	9:46
6.	"Kuning: Keberagamaan; Keberagaman; Leleng (Instrumental from Suku Dayak Kenyah, Samarinda)"	Faisal; Faisal, Mahmud	Mahmud; Faisal, Mahmud, Sudibyo	12:16
Total length:				64:30

== Released history ==
Country	Date	Format(s)	Label	Ref.
Indonesia	December 18, 2015	Jangan Marah Records	digital download	
Indonesia	December 22, 2015	Demajors Independent Music Industry	CD	

== Awards and nominations ==
Year	Awards	Category	Results
2016	Indonesian Choice Awards	Album of the Year	Nominated
