= Mukwaya =

Mukwaya is a Ugandan Baganda surname, and may refer to many people.

== A ==
- Abdullah Mukwaya, Qadi of Mbarara District and father of Usama Mukwaya

== J ==
- Janat Mukwaya, a Ugandan politician

== U ==
- Usama Mukwaya, a Ugandan film director

== O ==
- Olive Kazaarwe Mukwaya, a Ugandan lawyer and judge
