= Ahamed Siraj Kwikiriza =

Ugandan religious leader

- Preceded by: Shiekh Ramadhan Khamis
- Succeeded by: Abdullah Mukwaya

Personal details
- Born: Ahamed Siraj Kwikiriza
- Died: Mbarara, Uganda
- Occupation: District Qadi; Sheikh

Ahamed Siraj Kwikiriza was a Ugandan religious leader. He was the District Qadi of Mbarara District under the Ankole-Kigezi region until 1 September 2017.

== Death ==
Aged 50, Kwikiriza died in a motor accident on 1 September 2017 at Independence Park. He was with his son, who died on arrival after being rushed to Mbarara referral hospital. At the time of his death, Siraj had replaced Sheikh Ramadhan Khamis, who had been accused of selling Muslim property.

He was succeeded by Abdullah Mukwaya.

== See also ==
- List of Qadis of Mbarara District
