= Efek Rumah Kaca (album) =

Studio album by Efek Rumah Kaca
- Released: 2007; 2015 (re-release)
- Label: Paviliun Records; demajors (re-release)

Efek Rumah Kaca chronology
| Efek Rumah Kaca (00000000) | Kamar Gelap (2008) |

Efek Rumah Kaca is the first studio album by Efek Rumah Kaca. It was released in 2007 by Paviliun Records.

== Production ==
On "Di Udara", they assessed market interest for an ideologically or politically themed song. Cholil, the vocalist, wrote most of the lyrics for this album.

== Themes ==
"Di Udara" is dedicated to Munir, a human rights activist who was killed on a plane. The lyrics of "Efek Rumah Kaca" are about global warming, while "Bukan Lawan Jenis" addresses homosexuality. "Jatuh Cinta Itu Biasa Saja" states that blind love is not good. "Cinta Melulu" criticized the tendencies exhibited by Indonesian love songs, especially infidelity. "Melankolia" describes Choilil's mourning upon the death of his father, exhibited through the lyrics "Sadness is beautiful, it slows down the flow of blood". "Belanja Terus Sampai Mati" is an indictment of materialism.

== Musical styles ==
According to a review by Aditya Suharmoko in The Jakarta Post, "Cinta Melulu" and "Jatuh Cinta Itu Biasa Saja" are mellow but do not sound "cheesy", while "Di Udara" has a grim tone. The band called the music mostly introverted and has a slow tempo.

== Releases and receptions ==
As of 2008, the album has sold more than 4000 copies, making it Paviliun Records best-selling release. Suharmoko described the album as "breathtaking and brilliant". The royalties for the ringback tone for "Di Udara" were given to Munir's family. Rolling Stone Indonesia chose ""Di Udara" and "Cinta Melulu" as the 131st and 143rd best Indonesian songs of all time, respectively, in their December 2009 issue. The album was awarded Rolling Stone Indonesia's Rookie of the Year in 2008; that same year it was nominated for an MTV Asia award as well as an AMI award.

== Track listing ==
| No. | Title | Lyrics | Music | Length |
|---|---|---|---|---|
| 1. | "Jalang" ("Wild") | Cholil Mahmud | Cholil Mahmud | 4:42 |
| 2. | "Jatuh Cinta Itu Biasa Saja" ("Falling in Love is Ordinary") | Cholil Mahmud | Cholil Mahmud | 5:14 |
| 3. | "Bukan Lawan Jenis" ("Not the Opposite Sex") | Cholil Mahmud | Adrian Yunan, Akbar Bagus Sudibyo, Cholil Mahmud | 4:37 |
| 4. | "Belanja Terus Sampai Mati" ("Shop 'Til You Drop") | Cholil Mahmud, Irma Hidayana | Cholil Mahmud | 4:23 |
| 5. | "Insomnia" | Cholil Mahmud | Cholil Mahmud | 4:18 |
| 6. | "Debu-Debu Beterbangan" ("Dust Flies") | Cholil Mahmud | Adrian Yunan | 4:58 |
| 7. | "Di Udara" ("In the Air") | Cholil Mahmud | Cholil Mahmud | 4:35 |
| 8. | "Efek Rumah Kaca" ("Greenhouse Effect") | Cholil Mahmud | Akbar Bagus Sudibyo, Cholil Mahmud | 3:29 |
| 9. | "Melankolia" ("Melancholia") | Cholil Mahmud | Cholil Mahmud | 5:03 |
| 10. | "Cinta Melulu" ("Only Love") | Cholil Mahmud | Adrian Yunan, Cholil Mahmud | 4:22 |
| 11. | "Sebelah Mata" ("A Glance") | Adrian Yunan | Cholil Mahmud | 4:29 |
| 12. | "Desember" ("December") | Adrian Yunan, Cholil Mahmud | Cholil Mahmud | 4:16 |
