= Raisa (album) =

Studio album by Raisa
- Released: 14 May 2011
- Recorded: 2010–2011
- Genre: Pop, jazz
- Label: Universal Music Indonesia

Raisa chronology
Raisa (2011)	Heart to Heart (2011)

Singles from Raisa
- 1. "Serba Salah" Released: February 3, 2011; 2. "Apalah (Arti Menunggu)" Released: May 14, 2011; 3. "Could It Be" Released: June 13, 2011; 4. "Melangkah" Released: August 7, 2011

Raisa is the debut album of Indonesian pop singer Raisa, released in 2011, by Universal Music Indonesia. The album contains the singles "Serba Salah", "Apalah (Arti Menunggu)", "Could It Be" and "Melangkah".

Raisa gained commercial success, managing to rank first on the Indonesian weekly album chart. All singles managed to reach the top 3 on the charts, with "Apalah (Arti Menunggu)" and "Could It Be" at number one for seven and five weeks, respectively. Raisa was the fifth best-selling album in Indonesia in 2012. Its singles also made the top 10 of the best-selling songs in Indonesia in 2012, with "Apalah (Arti Menunggu)" at #2, "Could It Be" at #3 and "Serba Salah" at #8.

== Track listing ==
1. "Melangkah"
2. "Serba Salah"
3. "Cinta Sempurna"
4. "Inginku"
5. "Apalah (Arti Menunggu)"
6. "Bersama"
7. "Could It Be"
8. "Terjebak Nostalgia"
9. "Pergilah"
