= Ini Talkshow =

Indonesian talk show

- Presented by: Sule (2014-2020); Andre Taulany (2014-2020)
- Starring: Sule (2014-2020); Andre Taulany (2014-2020); Omesh (2019-2020); Mumuk Gomez (2019-2020); Ferry Maryadi (2020); Raffi Ahmad (2020); Nunung (2015-2020)
- Country of origin: Indonesia

Production
- Running time: 90 minutes

Original release
- Network: NET.
- Release: 23 March 2014 – 23 April 2020

Ini Talkshow (English: This is Talkshow) was an Indonesian talk show running on NET. The program was first aired on 24 March 2014. During Ramadan, this show was also available during Sahur under the name of Ini Sahur (This is Sahur).

== Cast ==
- Sutisna (Sule) as the host
- Andre Taulany as the host's consultant
- Yurike Prastika as Sule's mother (Mami)
- Sas Widjanarko (Mang Saswi) as Sule's uncle
- Muhammad Sulaeman Harsono (Bolot) as the head of the neighborhood (Pak RT)
- Eddy Soepono (Parto) as a security guard
- Tri Retno Prayudati (Nunung)
- Haruka Nakagawa as Sule's niece
- Komeng as the host's consultant
- Adul as the security
