= Kamar Gelap =

Studio album by Efek Rumah Kaca
- Released: December 19, 2008
- Label: Aksara Records

Efek Rumah Kaca chronology
Efek Rumah Kaca (2007)	Kamar Gelap (2008)	Sinestesia (2015)

Kamar Gelap (Dark Room) is the second album by Indonesian independent music band Efek Rumah Kaca. Released on December 19, 2008, it received the 2010 ICEMA award for best album of the year.

== Production ==
The recording of Kamar Gelap was more concentrated in studio, unlike the first album (which recorded at the band members' houses). Some musicians collaborated with Efek Rumah Kaca during recording, such as Ramondo Gascaro on "Laki-Laki Pemalu", Ade Paloh provided backing vocals and Iman Fattah played guitar on "Jangan Bakar Buku".

== Themes ==
The themes of the album are life style, love, phenomenon, environment and social critic. Social commentary can be found on "Mosi Tidak Percaya", with its lyrics regarding mistrust of the government and "Jangan Bakar Buku". Environmental themes can be found on "Hujan Jangan Marah" (about flooding) and "Banyak Asap Di Sana" (about economic equality and urbanization).

== Musical style ==
The Smashing Pumpkins, R.E.M. and The Smiths are cited by the band as influences in the making of Kamar Gelap. In "Lagu Kesepian", the music is progressive pop but melancholic. On "Laki-Laki Pemalu", waltz is dominating. "Tubuhmu Membiru.. Tragis" has a "catchy" melody and "Balerina" has a pop style.

== Release and reception ==
Kamar Gelap was released on December 19, 2008, by Aksara Records. The band claimed they captured social incidents and translated it into music. To perfect it, they hired photographers to make interpretative photos of their songs. On CD version, there is a fusion of the personnel's faces.

More than 3,000 copies were sold in the first two weeks of release, and the album was selected as ICEMA's The Best Album of 2010.

== Track listing ==
No.	Title	Lyrics	Music	Length
1.	"Tubuhmu Membiru... Tragis" ("Your Body Turns Blue... Tragic")	Cholil Mahmud	Adrian Yunan, Akbar Bagus Sudibyo, Cholil Mahmud	6:50
2.	"Kau dan Aku Menuju Ruang Hampa" ("You and I Heading Towards Vacuum")	Cholil Mahmud, Irma Hidayana	Cholil Mahmud	4:01
3.	"Mosi Tidak Percaya" ("Movement of Disbelievers")	Cholil Mahmud	Adrian Yunan, Akbar Bagus Sudibyo, Cholil Mahmud	3:53
4.	"Lagu Kesepian" ("Song of Loneliness")	Cholil Mahmud	Cholil Mahmud	4:30
5.	"Hujan Jangan Marah" ("Rain, Don't Be Angry")	Adrian Yunan	Adrian Yunan, Cholil Mahmud	4:29
6.	"Kenakalan Remaja di Era Informatika" ("Teenage Mischief in the Information Era")	Cholil Mahmud	Adrian Yunan, Akbar Bagus Sudibyo, Cholil Mahmud	4:23
7.	"Menjadi Indonesia" ("Becoming Indonesia")	Cholil Mahmud	Cholil Mahmud	4:39
8.	"Kamar Gelap" ("Dark Room")	Cholil Mahmud	Adrian Yunan	4:44
9.	"Jangan Bakar Buku" ("Don't Burn Books")	Cholil Mahmud	Cholil Mahmud	4:44
10.	"Banyak Asap di Sana" ("So Foggy over There")	Cholil Mahmud	Adrian Yunan, Cholil Mahmud	4:05
11.	"Laki-Laki Pemalu" ("Prude Boy")	Cholil Mahmud, Irma Hidayana	Adrian Yunan, Cholil Mahmud	5:14
12.	"Balerina" ("Ballerina")	Cholil Mahmud	Cholil Mahmud	4:02
