= Wing Kardjo =

Indonesian poet

Wing Kardjo (also spelled Karjo; 23 April 1937 in Garut, West Java – 19 March 2002 in Japan) was a prominent Indonesian poet who contributed actively to the development of Indonesian literature between 1965 and 1998.

== Early life ==
Wing Kardjo had his elementary and junior high school education in Tasikmalaya, then he moved back to Garut to have his senior high school education. After finishing the senior high school education, he went to Jakarta to study France literature.
