= Ramadhan Khamis =

- Preceded by: Abdu Noor Kaduyu
- Succeeded by: Ahamed Siraj Kwikiriza

Personal details
- Born: Ramadhan Khamis
- Occupation: District Qadi; Sheikh

Ramadhan Khamis is a Ugandan religious leader. He was the District Qadi of Mbarara District under the Ankole-Kigezi region until 10 October 2016.

== Suspension and removal ==
Sheikh Ramadhan Khamis, along with two other Muslim leaders, was accused of selling Muslim property and later suspended over the alleged fraudulent sale of Muslim land. The suspension would be announced by the chairman Uganda Muslim Supreme Council, Sheikh Adam Swalleh, in a press briefing at Mbarara Main Mosque and later officiated by the Mufti of Uganda, Sheikh Ramadhan Mubajje.

The land in question is located two miles outside Mbarara town on Mbarara-Masaka road.

He was succeeded by Ahamed Siraj Kwikiriza but later on wanted to stand for the position again upon the death of Ahamed in a car accident.
