= Abdullah Muhammad Mukwaya =

Teacher and religious leader

Abdullah Mukwaya
- Incumbent
- Assumed office 24 April 2019
- Preceded by: Ahamed Siraj Kwikiriza

Personal details
- Born: Abdullah Muhammad Mukwaya
- Children: Usama
- Occupation: District Qadi; Sheikh

Abdullah Muhammad Mukwaya is a Ugandan teacher and religious leader who is the District Qadi of Mbarara District under the Ankole-Kigezi region.

== Career ==
=== Qadi: 2019–present ===
He was inaugurated on 24 April 2019. At the ceremony Ugandan president Yoweri Museveni promised Mukwaya a new car, which was sent to him in October. The inauguration was led by Ahmed Nyago, the chairman of the Uganda Muslim Supreme Council electoral commission.

Mukwaya replaced Ahamed Siraj Kwikiriza who died in a motor accident in September 2017.
