= Light Balance =

Ukrainian LED dance troupe

- Origin: Dnipro, Ukraine
- Genres: Light Up (popping, roboting, lyrical hip hop, contemporary hip hop dance, breakdance, acrobatics)
- Years active: 2012–present
- Members: Denys Baldin (Co-Founder, Director); Mykyta Sukhenko (Co-Founder, Technical Director); Dmytro Kretsu (Choreographer); Dmytro Ryaboklyach (Technical Director)
- Website: lightbalance.net

Light Balance are a Ukrainian LED dance troupe formed in 2012 and based in Dnipro, Ukraine. They are best known for television appearances in competition shows.

== History ==
Light Balance competed in the 8th series of Britain's Got Talent in 2014. They placed 4th in the public voting in semifinal 4 and were eliminated.

In 2017 they competed in the 12th season of America's Got Talent, where they got a golden buzzer from host Tyra Banks during their audition and therefore, advanced straight to the live shows. They had a technical issue with their equipment in the quarterfinals, so their dress rehearsal performance was televised and judged. They received enough votes to advance to the semifinals. After their semifinal performance, they received enough votes to reach the finals. They placed 3rd for the season, behind Angelica Hale and Darci Lynne. In the finale, they performed with guest Derek Hough. They came in 3rd place like other similar acts previously on the show, Fighting Gravity and Team iLuminate.

In 2018, Light Balance performed at NET.'s Indonesian Choice Awards 2018 in Sentul, West Java.

In the winter of 2018, Light Balance performed on Broadway in New York City with The Illusionists: Magic of the Holidays.

In 2019, they were invited to compete in America's Got Talent: The Champions, but they did not advance to the finale.

Light Balance performed on Broadway as part of the famous show "The Illusionists" and worked on the stage with such famous artists as Jessie J and The Jacksons as part of the Art on Ice shows all across Switzerland. The group made appearances as special guests for Warner Bros., MGM Grand, Buick, Volkswagen, Nike, Siemens, McDonald's, Coca-Cola, ZAIN, NSP, Staples, Accor Hotels Group, and many other corporate clients throughout the world.

In April 2019, they teamed up with Netherrealm Studios for a special performance to celebrate the release of Mortal Kombat 11, the characters featured were Raiden, Scorpion, Sub-Zero, Baraka, Shao Kahn, and Skarlet.

In 2023, Light Balance Kids were invited to compete in America's Got Talent: All-Stars but due to the ongoing conflict in Ukraine some of their members were unable to leave the country. As such, the act combined with some members of Light Balance (though were still credited as Light Balance Kids).
