= Efek Rumah Kaca =

Indonesian indie band

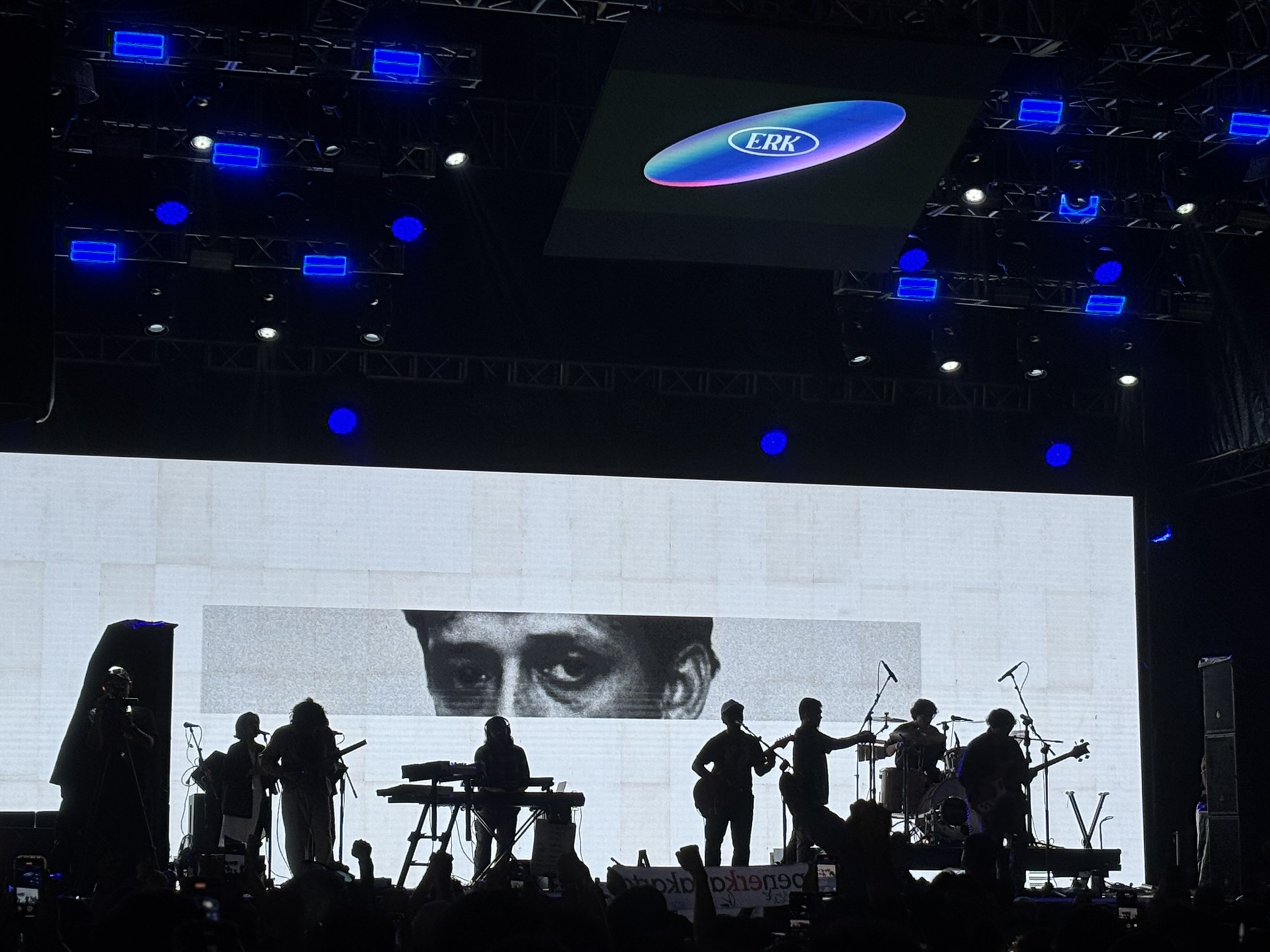
- Efek Rumah Kaca at The Sounds Project 8, August 2025

Background information
- Origin: Jakarta, Indonesia
- Genres: Ambience, pop, alternative rock, rock, indie rock
- Years active: 2001–present
- Members: Cholil Mahmud; Adrian Yunan Faisal; Airil Nur Abadiansyah; Akbar Bagus Sudibyo
- Website: efekrumahkaca.net

Efek Rumah Kaca (English: Greenhouse Effect) is an Indonesian indie rock band, formed in 2001. The band consists of Cholil Mahmud (lead vocal, guitar), Adrian Yunan Faisal (back vocals, bass, guitar), Airil "Poppie" Nur Abadiansyah (back vocals, bass) and Akbar Bagus Sudibyo (drum, back vocals). They are known for their satirical and thought-provoking lyrics—usually concerning politics or everyday society. They have released three albums, Efek Rumah Kaca (2007), Kamar Gelap (2008), and Sinestesia (2015).

== Career ==
=== 2001–2007: Early years and first album ===
The band formed in 2001 with five members, but in 2003 became a trio. The band's name at first was Hush, then Superego. They finally chose the name Efek Rumah Kaca after the release of their first album in 2007.

In 2007, they released Efek Rumah Kaca and the album sold more than 5,000 copies. Two singles of this album are "Di Udara" (English: In The Air) which tells the death of Munir Said Thalib and "Cinta Melulu" (English: Solely Love) as a criticism of the increasing prevalence of love-inspired songs in Indonesia.

=== 2008–2011: Kamar Gelap and major recognition ===
In 2008, Kamar Gelap (English: Dark Room), their second album, was released. Among the tracks from this album are "Jangan Bakar Buku" (English: Don't Burn Books), "Kenakalan Remaja di Era Informatika" (English: Teenage Mischief in the Information Era) and "Mosi Tidak Percaya" (English: Motion of no-confidence). They were nominated for three awards in the same year: Anugerah Musik Indonesia's "Best Alternative Production Work", "The Best Cutting Edge" in the MTV Indonesia Music Awards, and Rolling Stone Indonesia's "Editors’ Choice Awards: Rookie of the Year". Efek Rumah Kaca then went on to win the latter two.

In May 2010, they founded a record label, Jangan Marah Records (English: Don't Be Angry Records), hoping to accommodate creative bands that are not accepted by major labels.

=== 2012–2014: Hiatus and Pandai Besi ===
Efek Rumah Kaca used a more 'crowded formation' when they were playing at a festival in June 2012, thus the birth of a new project, called "Pandai Besi". A tight concert schedule and Adrian's health condition hampered the band on the completion of Efek Rumah Kaca's third album. Limitations of musical skills, routine office work and the health condition of Adrian became a trigger for Cholil and Akbar to find the right gap in order to continue working. They invited four musician friends who were deliberately selected for their different backgrounds and musical tastes to ‘recycle’ Efek Rumah Kaca's songs. They ended up re-arranging nine songs from their previous albums into a new album under the "Pandai Besi" name, titled Daur Baur which literally means recycle, fits with the album theme itself. In March 2013, Pandai Besi – with more members to the group – recorded the re-arranged songs at Lokananta, Surakarta, through crowdfunding method by the fans. Due to overwhelming requests from the public for a physical record, on June 29, 2013, Demajors Records officially released the physical copy of the album. Daur Baur received critical acclaim from music critics. Rolling Stone Indonesia wrote, "If Pandai Besi was a new band and this is a new song material, then the Daur Baur album will be Indonesia’s best debut album since the first album of Efek Rumah Kaca..." The Jakarta Globe said, "The whole album is littered with welcome surprises. Virtually every track ends up far from where it began. Perhaps the best thing to be said about Pandai Besi is that the band sounds like it exists as its own entity, without the baggage of its main, more famous, persona. The songs make their original versions feel like demos.."

=== 2015–present: Sinestesia and another hiatus ===
After Efek Rumah Kaca's hiatus, On July 10, 2015, the band released a new single titled "Pasar Bisa Diciptakan" (English: Markets Can Be Created), a fragment of the song "Biru" (English: Blue) which was based on making a further elaboration of "Cinta Melulu", restlessness the band felt on the process of making art and its position in the market/industry. The full version of "Biru" – consisting of "Pasar Bisa Diciptakan" and "Cipta Bisa Dipasarkan (English: Creations Can Be Marketed) – was then released a month later in August. On September 18, Efek Rumah Kaca held a concert titled "Pasar Bisa Dikonserkan" (English: Markets Can Be Concerted) in Balai Sartika, Bandung, but it drew a lot of disappointment from the crowd due to technical difficulties. A few days later the band apologized, while also releasing the single "Putih" (English: White) on the same day. "Putih" is divided into two parts, "Tiada" (English: Non-Existent) and "Ada" (English: Existent), and tells the story about family. The idea for "Tiada" came from their conversation with a friend who later died before the song was finished, while "Ada" came from the happiness of the birth of their children. On December 18, the band finally released their third album, Sinestesia, on iTunes for free. All of the songs in the album are named after colors, with each named after the color Adrian – who suffers from Behçet's disease that has caused his loss of sight – sees when he hears each song.

On 12 August 2016, the band released a one-off single, titled "Merdeka" (English: Independent), which discusses the theme of independence in Indonesia. Efek Rumah Kaca performed with complete members in Soundrenaline in Bali, and held a surprise concert in Gudang Sarinah, Jakarta, titled "Tiba-Tiba Suddenly Concert" (English: Suddenly Suddenly Concert) as it was announced to the public just hours prior to the show. It would be their last performance with complete members in a while, before lead singer Cholil returns to the United States.

== Musical style ==
They have said that music is their lives. Everything that has happened in their lives is reflected in their music. They also have been described as a pop band with social and political messages in their lyrics. Their music is influenced by variety of music genres, including swing, jazz, rock, and a cappella.

Their songs often address social and political issues. Such as "Cinta Melulu", which criticizes the increasing prevalence of love-inspired songs in Indonesia.; or "Belanja Terus Sampai Mati", an indictment of materialism.

In their earlier years, the band called their music mostly introverted and has a slow tempo. The Smashing Pumpkins, R.E.M. and The Smiths are cited as some of the influences in their music.

== Discography ==
=== Albums ===
Title	Album details	Single
Efek Rumah Kaca; Greenhouse Effect	Released: 2007; Label: Paviliun Records	"Jatuh Cinta Itu Biasa Saja"; "Cinta Melulu"; "Di Udara"; "Desember"
Kamar Gelap; Dark Room	Released: December 19, 2008; Label: Aksara Records	"Kenakalan Remaja di Era Informatika"; "Mosi Tidak Percaya"; "Balerina"
Sinestesia; Synesthesia	Released: December 18, 2015; Label: Jangan Marah Records	"Biru"; "Putih"
