= Vincent Raditya =

Indonesian pilot (born 1984)

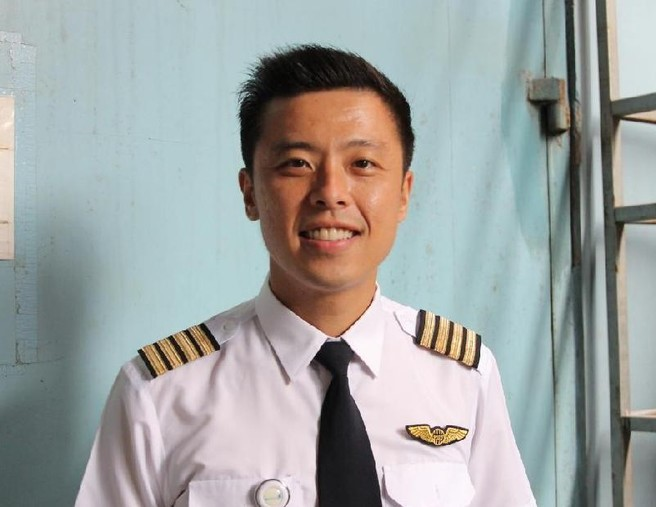
- Born: Vincent Raditya; 7 November 1984 (age 41); Jakarta, Indonesia
- Occupations: Pilot; YouTuber; singer; author
- Years active: 2010–present
- Spouses: Vegen Acni Married (m. 2007; div. 2017); Novita Condro Dewi (m. 2017; div. 2021); Fanny Margaretha (m. 2022; div. 2025)
- Children: 5

YouTube information
- Channel: Vincent Raditya
- Genres: Aviation; automotive industry
- Subscribers: 5.94 million
- Views: 595 million
- Last updated: 21 October 2025

Vincent Raditya (born 7 November 1984) is an Indonesian pilot and YouTuber from Jakarta. He is one of the first aviator YouTube vlogger from Indonesia and is mostly known for his YouTube channel Captain Vincent Raditya. Raditya is known for producing aviation and automotive related videos on YouTube.

== Early life and education ==
Raditya was born in Jakarta, the capital and of Indonesia. In 2009, he began his first flight training course at Epic Aviation, in the United States.

== Career ==
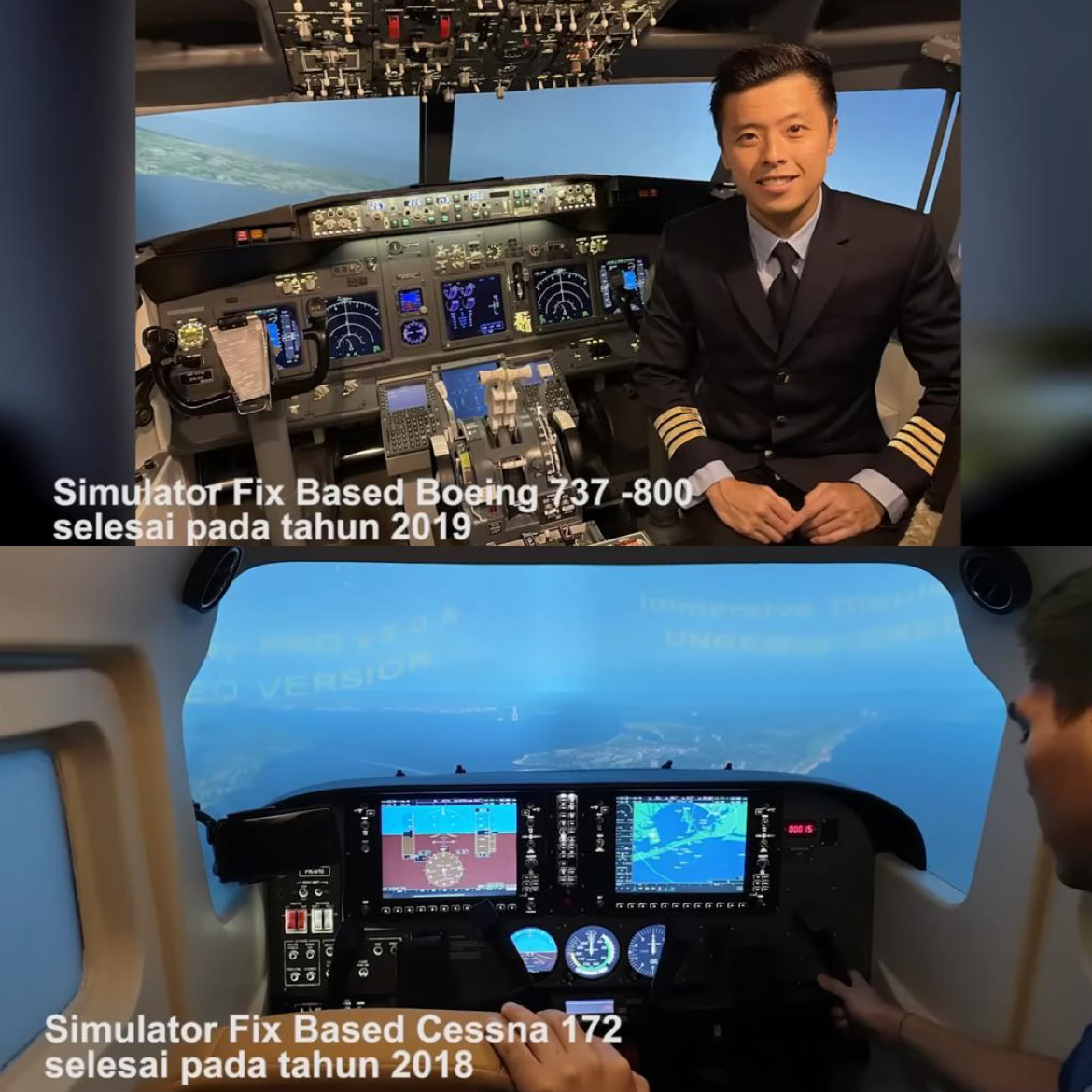
Boing 737 and Cessna 172

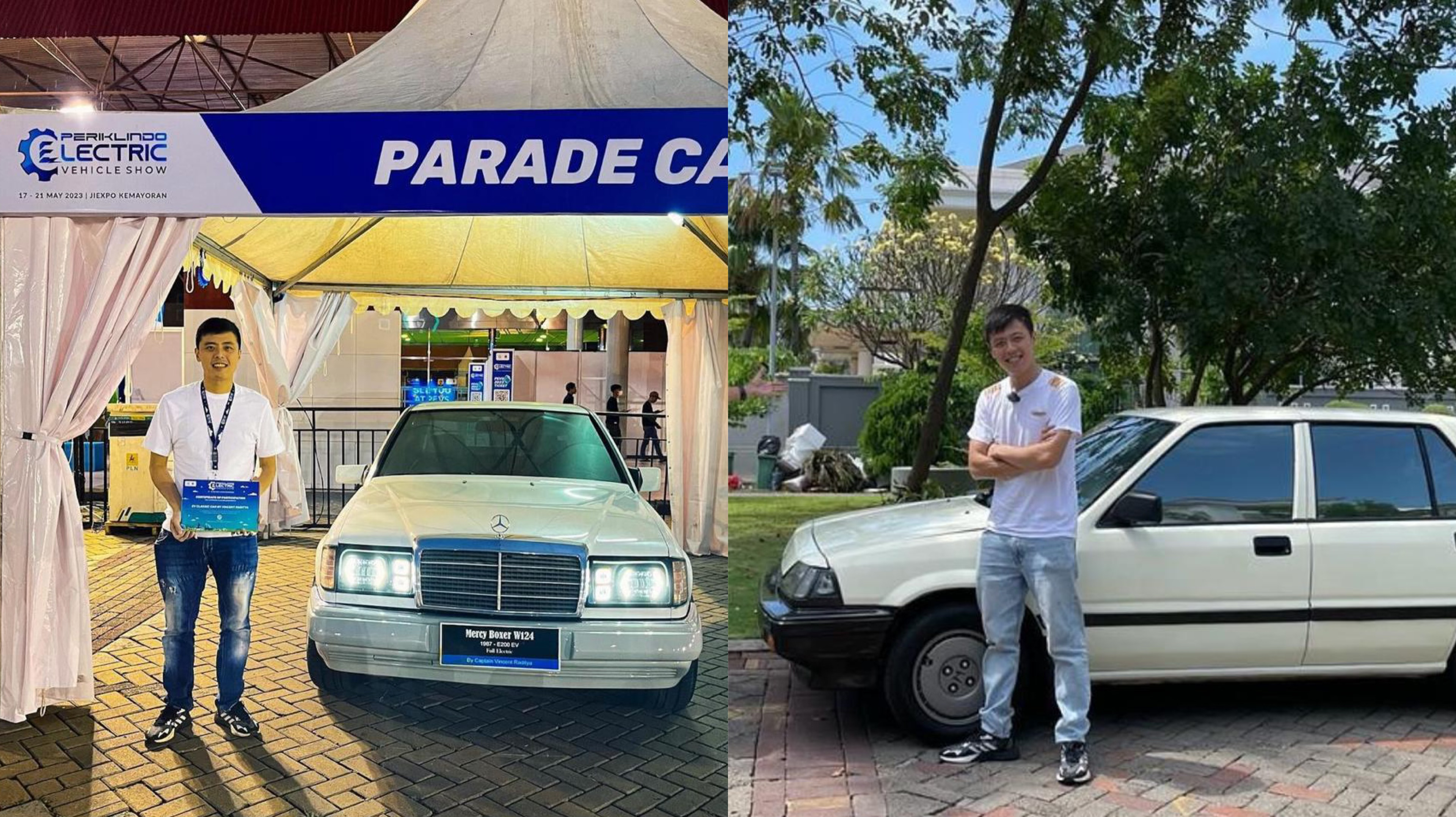
Electric Mercedes-Benz E-Class W124

Raditya has been a pilot since 2010 and started vlogging on YouTube.

The Indonesian Air Force Information Service (AU) has collaborated with Raditya, to promote awareness of aerospace.

In 2017, he and his colleague Nikko Agustino built a Simulator Repair Based Cessna 172 G1000 aircraft using a used aircraft frame, PK-NIV, which had previously been flown by one of the Semarang accident pilots. In 2018, they were in creating a Fix Based Fix Boeing Boeing 737-800 simulator using the used airplane frame from the scrapped old Sriwijaya Air Boeing 737-200, PK-CJM.

In 2022, he was converting regular Civic Wonder vehicles to complete electric automobiles in his garage at home.

According to media reports, in 2023 Raditya undertook the conversion of the Mercedes-Benz E-Class W124, colloquially known as Mercy Boxer, into an electric vehicle. The purported mileage of the converted vehicle is stated to be capable of reaching up to 100 kilometers on a fully charged battery, with 10% charge remaining. Furthermore, the Mercy Boxer has demonstrated a top speed of up to 100 kilometers per hour.

== Controversies ==
According to the CNBC Indonesia report in April 2022, Raditya was questioned by Criminal Investigation Unit at the National Police Headquarters for 15 hours in relation to his purported involvement in an online gambling incident disguised as a trading transaction on the Binomo application. Which there is no charge to him due to the fact that he is only act as a paid influencer to promote.

In November 2022, the marriage of Raditya and Fanny Margaretha sparked public discussion due to their having a daughter after only one week of marriage. Additionally, the couple has been met with controversy due to the 17-year age gap between them.
