= Rizky Febian =

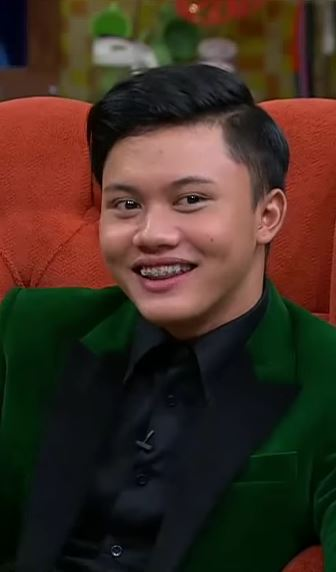
- Rizky Febian guesting on Ini Talkshow

Background information
- Also known as: Rizky, Kiki, Iky
- Born: Rizky Febian Adriansyah Sutisna; 25 February 1998 (age 28); Bandung, West Java, Indonesia
- Genres: Pop; Jazz; R&B; Dance
- Occupations: Singer; Songwriter; Actor; Streamer
- Instruments: Sompoton; Guitar
- Years active: 2013–present
- Label: RFAS Music
- Spouse: Mahalini (m. 2024)

Rizky Febian Adriansyah Sutisna (born 25 February 1998) is an Indonesian singer, songwriter, and actor. He is the eldest son of the Indonesian comedian Sule. Some of his famous singles are Cuek, Mantra Cinta, and Makna Cinta.

== Biography ==
Rizky Febian Adriansyah Sutisna is the eldest son of the famous Indonesian comedian Sule (Sutisna) and his ex-wife Lina. His name began to rise when he starred in Indonesian soap operas. Before starting his musical career, he occasionally appeared together with his father. Later he also frequently appeared on several TV programmes. Rizky always supported by his father regarding his singing and comedian career.

In 2011 along with Sule, he released his first single, titled Papa Phone. Then followed by Smile U Do not Cry together with 3 Djanggo (feat. comedian Andre Taulany), released in 2013.

== Filmography ==
=== Film ===
Year	Title	Role	Notes
2011	Sule Detektif Tokek	Iki	
2016	Cahaya Cinta Pesantren	Abu	
2018	Hongkong Kasarung	Rizky	
2024	Kata	Nugraha	

=== Television series ===
Year	Title	Role	Notes	Network
2009	Awas Ada Sule	Sule kecil		
2014	Mega Sinema	Rizky		
2015 - 2016	Super Dede	Saipul/Ipul	Supporting role	MNCTV
2016	Stereo	Dimas	Supporting role	NET.
2016	Kesempurnaan Cinta	Penjual es krim		
2017	Kelas Internasional	Rizky Febian		
2020	4 Sehat 5 Sule	Iky		

=== Variety shows ===
Year	Title	Role	Notes	Network
2011	Saung Sule	Pengisi acara		
2014	Kata Bergaya	as Co-presenter		antv
2014	Siang Seru Sama Sule			
2015	Bukan Sekedar Wayang	Pengisi acara		NET.
2017	Berbagi Rizki	Pembawa acara		
2018	Indonesian Idol Junior	Juri		
2020	Pop Academy	Juri		
	Cerita Cinta Sule	Pengisi acara		
2021	The Voice Kids Indonesia	Juri tim		
2021	Indonesia's Next Top Model	Tamu spesial		
2022	Dinasti Tambun	Pengisi acara		
2022	X Factor Indonesia	Bintang tamu		
2022	Allo Bank Festival	Pengisi acara		
2023	Gimme the Mic	Juri		

== Discography ==
=== Singles ===
Year	Title	Label
2011	Papa Telepon (ft Sule)	
2013	Smile U Don't Cry (ft Sule, Andre)	
2014	Terbaik Untukmu	Valf Record
2015	Kesempurnaan Cinta	NET. Mediatama
2016	Kesempurnaan Cinta (Remix Version) ft Evan Virgan	NET. Mediatama
2016	Penantian Berharga	NET. Mediatama
2017	Cukup Tau	NET. Mediatama

=== Soundtrack appearances ===
Album information	Track list
Kesempurnaan Cinta season 1 - television series: Released: August 11, 2015; Language: Indonesia	Track listing: Kesempurnaan Cinta
Kesempurnaan Cinta season 2 - television series: Released: August 11, 2015; Language: Indonesia	Track listing: Kesempurnaan Cinta
Dear Love (2016) - Movie: Released: August 11, 2015; Language: Indonesia	Track listing: Kesempurnaan Cinta

== Awards and nominations ==
Year	Award	Category	Recipients	Results	Ref.
2016	8th Dahsyatnya Awards	Outstanding Newcomer	Rizky Febian	Won	
2016	14th SCTV Music Awards	Most Popular Newcomer	Rizky Febian	Won	
2016	14th SCTV Music Awards	Most Popular Song	Kesempurnaan Cinta	Won	
2016	3rd Indonesian Choice Awards	Breakthrough Artist of the Year	Rizky Febian	Won	
2016	3rd Indonesian Choice Awards	Song of the Year	Kesempurnaan Cinta	Won	
2016	9th Nickelodeon Indonesia Kids' Choice Awards	Favorite Indonesian's Song	Kesempurnaan Cinta	Won	
2016	19th Anugerah Musik Indonesia	Best Pop Male Solo Artist	Rizky Febian	Nominated	
2016	19th Anugerah Musik Indonesia	Best Pop Songwriter	Kesempurnaan Cinta	Won	
2016	19th Anugerah Musik Indonesia	Best of the Best Newcomer	Rizky Febian	Won	
2016	19th Anugerah Musik Indonesia	Production Work - Best of the Best	Kesempurnaan Cinta (NET. Mediatama)	Nominated	
2016	15th Anugerah Planet Muzik	APM Most Popular Song	Kesempurnaan Cinta	Nominated	
2016	15th Anugerah Planet Muzik	Best New Male Artist	Rizky Febian	Won	

Year	Award	Category	Recipients	Results	Ref
2017	15th SCTV Music Awards	Most Popular Male Singer	Rizky Febian	Pending	
2017	15th SCTV Music Awards	Most Popular Music Video	Penantian Berharga	Pending	
2017	4th Indonesian Choice Awards	Male Singer of The Year	Rizky Febian	Pending	
2017	4th Indonesian Choice Awards	Song of the Year	Penantian Berharga	Pending	
