= Raditya Dika =

Indonesian author, actor, movie director, and social media personality

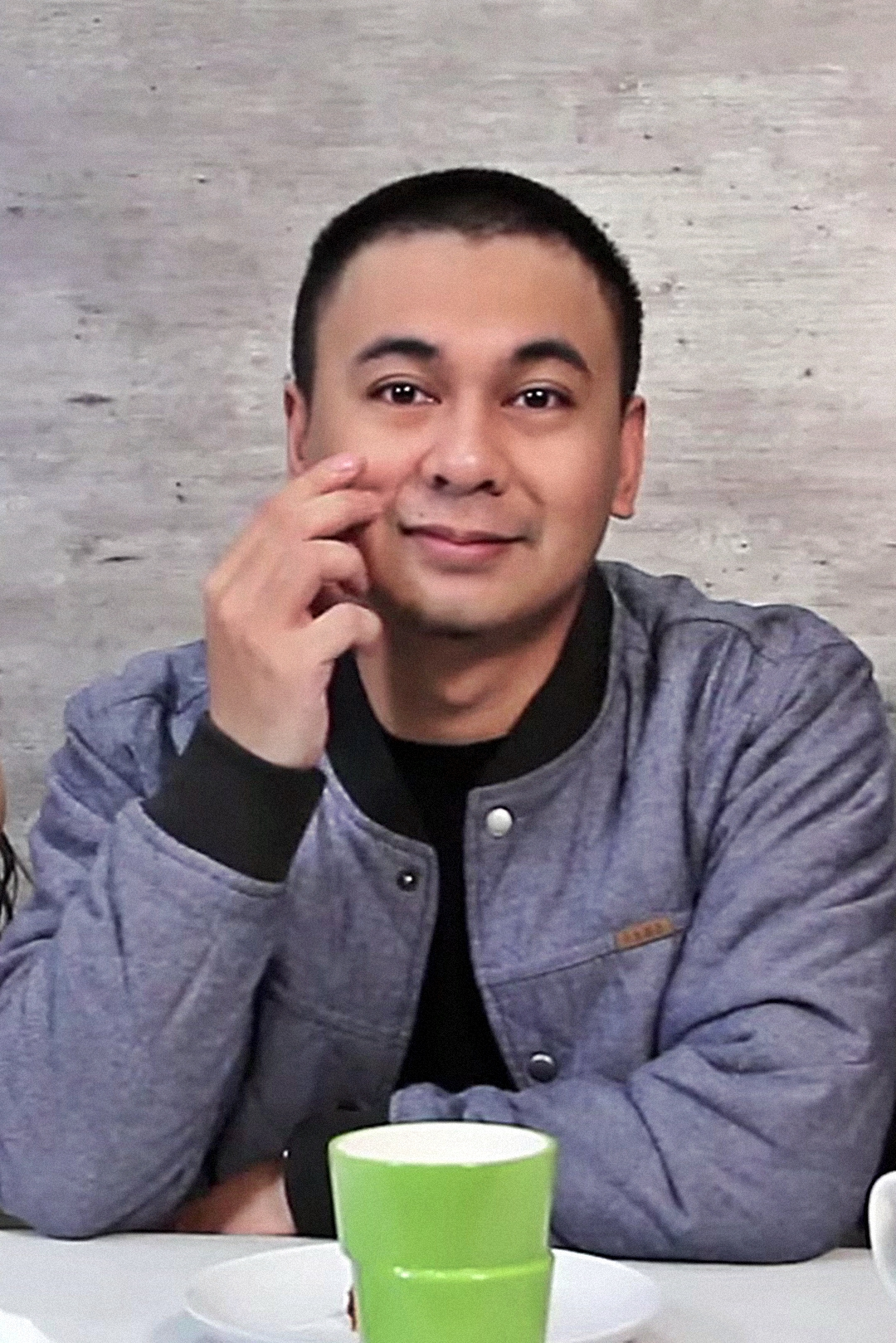
- Raditya Dika in 2017
- Born: Dika Angkasaputra Moerwani Nasution; 28 December 1984 (age 41); Jakarta, Indonesia
- Education: University of Adelaide (no degree); University of Indonesia
- Occupations: Blogger; Author; Humorist; comedian; Scriptwriter; Film director; Celebrity; Social media personality
- Years active: 1986–present
- Spouse: Anissa Aziza (m. 2018)
- Children: Alinea Ava Nasution; Aksara Asa Nasution

YouTube information
- Channel: Raditya Dika
- Years active: 2007–present
- Subscribers: 11.2 million
- Views: 2 billion
- Last updated: 19 December 2025
- Website: radityadika.com

Dika Angkasaputra Moerwani Nasution (born 28 December 1984), known as Raditya Dika, is an Indonesian author, actor, movie director, YouTuber, and social media personality. He is best known for his stand-up comedy.

He wrote six national bestselling books and starred as the main character in Cinta Brontosaurus (2013), Manusia Setengah Salmon (2013), Marmut Merah Jambu (2014) and Koala Kumal (2016) on the title of the books he wrote. He also appeared in a TV comedy serial called "Malam Minggu Miko" on Kompas TV, jury of Stand Up Comedy Indonesia and Stand Up Comedy Academy and host of Comic Action on Indosiar. He is also one of the first Indonesian YouTubers who received "Youtube Partner Rewards" and the first Indonesian YouTuber to gain more than 1 million subscribers.

== Early life and education ==
Raditya Dika is the eldest of five siblings. He has three younger sisters and one younger brother: Ingga, Anggi, Yudhita, and Edgar.

He graduated from SMP Tarakanita and SMA 70 Bulungan. He continued his education at the University of Adelaide but left for personal reasons, later he joined the extension program in Universitas Indonesia, majoring in Politics.

== Bibliography ==
- Raditya, Dika (2005). Kambing Jantan : Sebuah Catatan Harian pelajar Bodoh [Black Goat: A dumb student diary] (in Indonesian). Jakarta: Gagas Media. ISBN 9789793600697.
- Raditya, Dika (2005). Cinta Brontosaurus [Love of Brontosaurus] (in Indonesian). Jakarta: GagasMedia. ISBN 9789797800598.
- Raditya, Dika (2007). Radikus Makankakus: Bukan Binatang Biasa [Radikus Makankakus:Not Ordinary Animal] (in Indonesian). Jakarta: Gagas Media. ISBN 9789797801663.
- Raditya, Dika (2008). Babi Ngesot: Datang Tak Diundang, Pulang Tak Berkutang [Puckles Pig: Comes Uninvited, Returning Unbreasted] (in Indonesian). Jakarta: Gagas Media. ISBN 9786028066105.
- Raditya, Dika (2010). Marmut Merah Jambu [A Pink Marmot] (in Indonesian). Jakarta: Bukuné. ISBN 9786028066648.
- Raditya, Dika (2011). Manusia Setengah Salmon [A Half Salmon Human] (in Indonesian). Jakarta: Gagas Media. ISBN 9789797805319.
- Raditya, Dika (2014). Koala Kumal [A Dingy Koala] (in Indonesian). Jakarta: Gagas Media. ISBN 9789797807696.

== Filmography ==
- Cinta Brontosaurus [Love of Brontosaurus] (in Indonesian). Jakarta. 2013.
- Manusia Setengah Salmon [A Half Salmon Human] (in Indonesian). Jakarta. 2013.
- Marmut Merah Jambu [Pink Marmot] (in Indonesian). Jakarta. 2014.
