= Andre Taulany =

Indonesian actor and musician

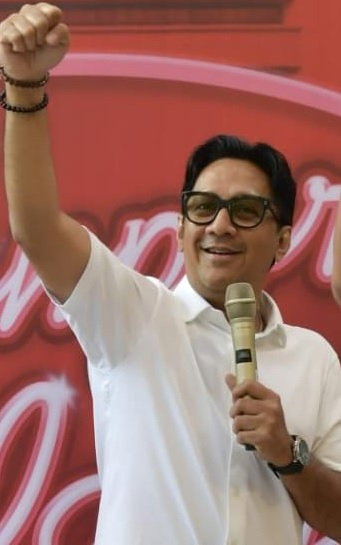
- At Indonesia Independence celebration event in 2023
- Born: Andreas Taulany Haumahu; 17 September 1974 (age 52); Jakarta, Indonesia
- Occupations: Celebrity; Comedian; Presenter; Singer; Content creator; Songwriter
- Years active: 1992–present
- Spouse(s): Rien Wartia Trigina (m. 2005; div. 2024) Amanda Rigby (m. 2026)
- Children: Ardio Raihansyah Taulany; Arkenzy Salmansyah Taulany; Arlova Carissa Taulany
- Parent(s): Robby Haumahu (father); Rasidah Hanum Hasibuan (mother)

Andreas Taulany Haumahu (born 17 September 1974) is an Indonesian actor, comedian, presenter, singer, content creator, and songwriter of mixed Batak and Moluccan descent. He is the former lead vocalists, founder and leader of Indonesian music group, Stinky.

== Band ==
In 1992, he formed an Indonesian band called Stinky (before Slugi). He left the band in 2008.

== Discography ==
With Stinky

- Stinky (Album 1997)
- JTD (Album 1998)
- Rindu Untuk Dia (Album 1999)
- Permata Hati (Album 2001)
- Stinky 5 (Album 2003)
- Langkah Terbaik (Album 2004)
- Album Tujuh (Album 2005)
- Pecinta Sejati (Album 2007)

Solo Karier

- Andre (2000)
- Cintailah Istanaku (2005)
- Sayangku (singel 2015)
- Ayah (singel 2020)
- Bulan (singel 2021)

With OVJ and Sule

- Bibirmu Dower (bersama SM#SH) (2011)
- Andeca Andeci (bersama 7 Ikans) (2011)
- Smile U don't Cry (bersama Sule) (2011)
- Potong Bebek Angsa (bersama Super Senior) (2012)
- Smile U don't Cry (remix) (bersama 3 Djanggo) (2013)
- Atitnya Tuh Disini (bersama Cita Citaku) (2014)

With The Prediksi

- Orkes Prediksi (2021)

== Filmography ==
Year	Title	Role	Note
2003	Kiamat Sudah Dekat	Fandy	
2004	Ketika	Boy	
2004	17th	Yuda	
2008	Kun Fayakuun	Sang Suami	
2009	Susuk Pocong	Asmo	
2012	Sule, Ay Need You	Andre	
2024	Pasutri Gaje	Pak Camat	

== TV Show ==
=== Soap opera ===
- Masih Ada Cinta
- Cerita Cinta (1999)
- Bumi dan Langit 2002)
- Bintang Idola (2002)
- Cinta Pertama (2002)
- Terang Milikku Juga (2003–2004)
- Hidayah (2005–2006)
- Permana dan Permata (2005)
- Kiamat Sudah Dekat (2005–2007)
- Mansoor La Gokilun (2009)
- Mas Boy dan Lemon (2013)
- Para Pencari Tuhan Jilid 15 (2022)

=== Television film ===
- FTV Hidayah MD
- Dadang Dudung
- Dadang Dudung 2
- Pencopet dan Pacarnya
- Lapor Pak! the Movie: Hilangnya Mahkota Atlantis
- Lapor Pak!: Telegram Rahasia
- Arisannya Lapor Pak!

=== TV Show ===
- Ngelenong Nyok
- Komedi Betawi
- Lenong.co.id
- Opera Van Java
- Sahurnya OVJ
- OVJ Awards
- OVJ Cup
- OVJ Roadshow
- Pelangi
- PAS Mantab
- The Promotor
- Mas Boy & Lemon
- Awas Ada Sule 2
- Karoke Keliling
- Ini Talkshow
- Ini Sahur
- Comedy Night Live
- Pagi Pagi
- Alkisah
- Santuy Malam
- The Sultan Entertainment
- Ada Show
- Hangout with Andre
- Lapor Pak!
- Sahur Seger
- Pas Buka
- Pas Sore
- D'Cafe
- Bercanda Tapi Santai
- Bercanda Pagi
- Sahur Lebih Segerr
- Papa Rock n Roll
- Gasskeun
- Monitor Ketua
