= Sule (comedian) =

Indonesian comedian and actor (born 1976)

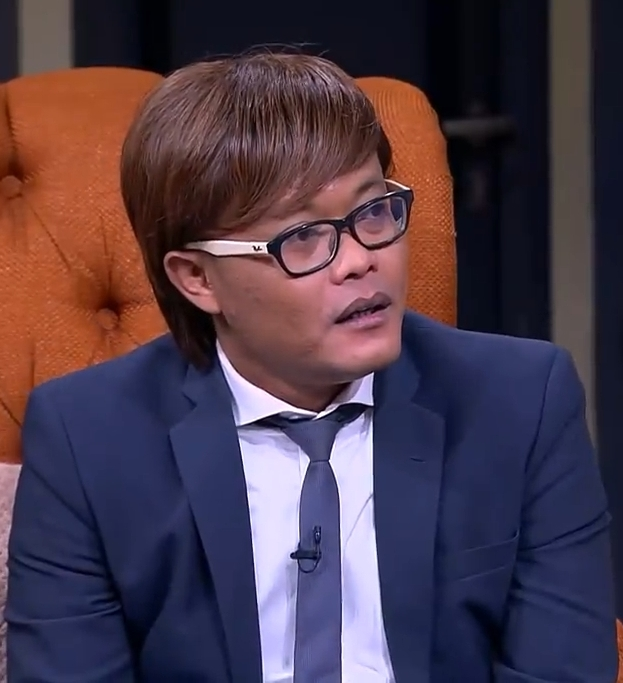
- Born: Sutisna; 15 November 1976 (age 49); Cimahi, West Java, Indonesia
- Notable work: Opera Van Java
- Spouses: Lina Jubaedah (m. 1997; div. 2018) Nathalie Holscher (m. 2020; div. 2022)
- Children: With Lina Jubaedah: Rizky Febian Adriansyah Sutisna; Putri Delina Andriany Sutisna; Rizwan Fadilah Adriansyah Sutisna; Ferdinand Adriansyah Sutisna; With Nathalie Holscher: Adzam Adriansyah Sutisna

Comedy career
- Medium: Television

Sutisna (born 15 November 1976), more commonly known as Sule, is an Indonesian comedian and actor. He became well-known after winning the Indonesian comedian audition show API (Audisi Pelawak Indonesia) with Ogi Suwarna and Obin Wahyudin in the group SOS in 2005.

In 2013, Sule collaborated with Korean singer Eru in a multi-lingual music video titled "Saranghaeyo".

== Personal life ==
Sule was married to Lina Jubaedah from 1997 until 2018. He was remarried to Nathalie Holscher and divorced on 10 August 2022.

== Filmography ==
=== Films ===
Year	Title	Role	Notes
2009	Janda Kembang	Erik	
2012	Sule, Ay Need You	Sule	
2013	Sule Detektif Tokek	Sule	
2018	Hongkong Kasarung	Sule	
2019	Arwah Kuntilanak Duyung	Sule	

=== Television films ===
- Dadang Dudung
- Dadang Dudung 2
- Sule Love Mimin
- When Sule meet Sulis
- Steven Cau I Love You
- Steven Cau I Love You 2

=== Television ===
- Saung SOS
- Komedi Putar on TPI
- Opera Van Java on Trans 7
- PAS Mantab on Trans 7
- Awas Ada Sule on Global TV
- Awas Ada Sule 2 on Global TV
- Untung Ada Sule on Global TV
- Oesman 77 on Trans 7
- Siang Seru Sama Sule on Global TV
- Kata Bergaya on Antv
- Ini Talkshow on NET.
- Bukan Sekedar Wayang (voice) on NET.
- Ini Sahur on NET.
- Comedy Night Live (Alkisah) on NET.
- Sahurnya Pesbukers on antv
- Awas Ada Sule Lagi on GTV
- Santuy Malam on Trans TV
- Kontes Dangdut Indonesia 2020 on MNC TV
- Cerita Cinta Sule on Trans TV
- Rumah Seleb on MNC TV

== Awards ==
=== Panasonic Gobel Awards ===
Year	Category	Recipient	Result
2010	Favorite Comedian	Sule	Nominated
2011	Favorite Comedian	Sule	Won
2012	Favorite Comedian	Sule	Won
2013	Favorite Comedian	Sule	Nominated
2014	Favorite Comedian	Sule	Nominated

=== Nickelodeon Indonesia Kids' Choice Awards ===
Year	Category	Recipient	Result
2011	Favorite Comedian	Sule	Won
2012	Favorite Comedian	Sule	Won
2013	Favorite Comedian	Sule	Nominated
2014	Favorite Comedian	Sule	Nominated
2015	Favorite Presenter	Sule	Nominated
2016	Favorite Comedian	Sule	Pending

=== Bright Awards Indonesia ===
Year	Category	Recipient	Result
2016	Favorite Male Star Advertisement	Sule	Nominated
