= Raisa (singer) =

Indonesian singer and songwriter (born 1990)

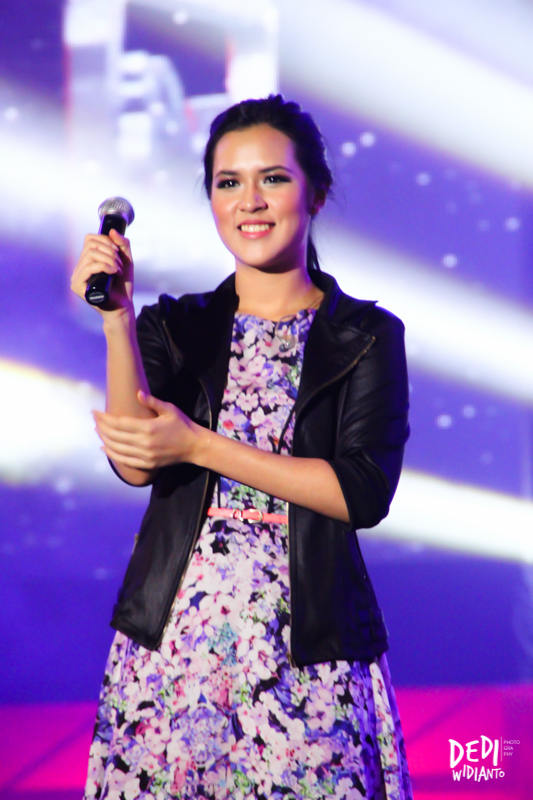
- Raisa at LA Lights Music Project 2013
- Born: Raisa Andriana; 6 June 1990 (age 36); Jakarta, Indonesia
- Education: BINUS University
- Occupations: Singer; songwriter; businesswoman
- Musical career
- Genres: Pop; R&B
- Instruments: Vocal; piano
- Years active: 2008–present
- Labels: Solid Records; Universal Music Indonesia; Juni Records (co-distributed by Empire)
- Website: raisa6690music.com

Raisa Andriana (born 6 June 1990), better known by her mononym Raisa, is an Indonesian singer and songwriter. She became publicly known for her song titled "Serba Salah". Before her solo career, she was one of the lead vocalists of Kevin Aprilio's band, Andante, which was later renamed Vierra (now Vierratale).

Raisa has received several accolades, including the Indonesian Music Awards, Music Planet Awards, and Mnet Asian Music Awards. In 2014, she charted at 45th place on Billboard Uncharted, marking her first time to enter the Billboard chart. Later in 2017, she reached 29th place on Billboard Social 50, a chart that ranks the most active musical artists on the world's leading social networking services.

== Background ==
Raisa Andriana was born on 6 June 1990, in Jakarta, Indonesia, to Allan Nur Ihsan Rachman and Ria Mariaty. She studied at Binus University. Raisa's singing talent has been shown since an early age. When she was 3, Raisa often pretended to be a singer on stage. Growing up with minimal music education, she picked up her unique singing style and voice from some of her favorite singers, such as Brian Mcknight, India Arie, Stevie Wonder, Joss Stone, etc.

== Career ==
=== 2008–2010: Career beginning and "Andante" ===
Her career as a singer began when she collaborated with famous composer David Foster to perform in a concert in Jakarta. She was the vocalist of Andante, a band founded by Kevin Aprilio. In 2008 the band was reshaped and named Vierra, consisting of five members: Raisa, Widi Soediro, Raka Cyril, Satrianda Widjanarko, and Kevin Aprilio himself. She exited the band when the record's label decided it wanted a different concept.

=== 2010–2013: Early success with debut album ===
Raisa started gaining recognition with her single "Serba Salah". The song led her to gain popularity in the Indonesian music industry. She then won an award in the Indonesian Music Awards for Best of the Best Newcomer category.

Her debut album, Raisa, was produced and released in 2011 by Solid Records and Universal Music Indonesia. The album was supported by the young musicians who collaborated as producers: Asta Andoko (RAN), Ramadhan Handy (Soulvibe), and Adrianto Ario Seto (Soulvibe). Nanda Oka and Asta Andoko are Executive Producers of Solid Records.

=== 2013–2015: Heart To Heart and Indonesian Idol ===
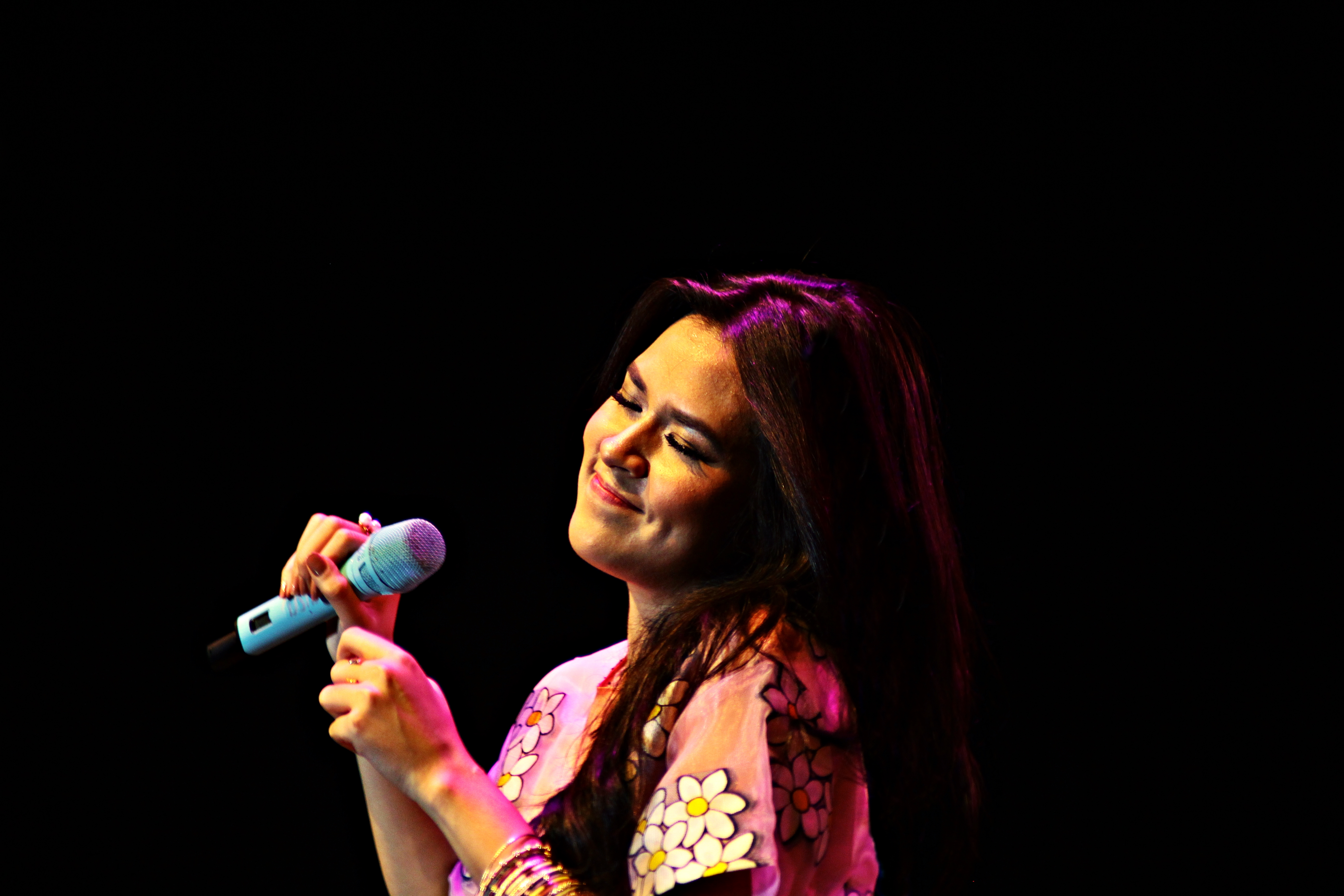
Raisa at Dental Project 2015.

Raisa launched her second album, titled Heart to Heart on 27 November 2013. The album featured two singles "Bye-Bye" and "Pemeran Utama". She also performed a concert "Heart to Heart Showcase: Happy (Raisa's version)", targeted at the media and 300 of 'YourRaisa' fans that had been previously selected by pre-ordering the Raisa box set online.

On 25 August 2013, she opened Metallica's concert in Jakarta with Indonesian rock/metal band Seringai, performing Indonesia's national anthem "Indonesia Raya".

In 2014, Raisa was appointed as a guest judge for a television talent show: Indonesian Idol Season 8. At first, she was a guest judge but later became permanently involved. In February 2015, Walt Disney Pictures selected Raisa to sing the soundtrack "A Dream Is a Wish Your Heart Makes" translated to the Indonesian version "Mimpi adalah Harapan Hati" for a Disney remake of Cinderella.

=== 2015–present: Handmade and The Voice Indonesia ===
In 2015, Raisa collaborated with singer Afgan for the soundtrack film London Love Story, titled "Percayalah". She released her third studio album Handmade in 2016 under the label Juni Records and produced two singles "Jatuh Hati" and "Kali Kedua".

In April 2016, Raisa performed a concert "Handmade Showcase" which was held on Ciputra Artpreneur. She is currently preparing to perform in tours in major Indonesian cities: "Handmade Tour" which will begin in August until September.

In June 2016, Raisa was a guest star for the Grand Final of The Voice Indonesia Season 2 where she performed the song "Cahaya Cantik Harimu". Raisa was appointed as a guest star at the Peabo Bryson' Live in Concert – Celebrating 40 Years of Magic in The Hall, Senayan City. On that occasion, she performed a duet "Beauty and the Beast" and "A Whole New World" with him.

== Personal life ==
Raisa Andriana married Australian actor Hamish Daud on Sunday, 3 September 2017. On 12 February 2019, they had their first child, a daughter. The couple named their daughter Zalina Raine Wyllie.

Raisa has officially filed for divorce from Hamish Daud after being married since September 2017. Their first divorce hearing is scheduled for November 3, 2025.

== Discography ==
=== Studio albums ===
Title	Album details
Raisa	Released: 11 May 2011; Label: Solid Records, Universal Music Indonesia; Formats: CD, digital download
Heart to Heart	Released: 27 November 2013; Label: Solid Records, Universal Music Indonesia; Formats: CD, digital download
Handmade	Released: 27 April 2016; Label: Juni Records; Formats: CD, digital download
It's Personal	Released: 17 March 2022; Label: Juni Records; Formats: CD, digital download, Vinyl
Live at Stadion Utama Gelora Bung Karno	Released: 3 October 2024; Label: Juni Records; Formats: Digital download
ambiVert	Released: 25 June 2025; Label: Juni Records; Formats: CD, digital download, Vinyl

=== Mini album ===
- It's Personal (2021)

=== Compilation album ===
Title	Album details
The Best of Raisa	Released: 7 March 2016; Label: Juni Records; Formats: CD, digital download

=== Singles ===
Title	Year	Album	Label
"Apalah (Arti Menunggu)"	2011	Raisa	Universal Music Indonesia
"Serba Salah"	2011	Raisa	Universal Music Indonesia
"Could It Be"	2012	Raisa	Universal Music Indonesia
"Terjebak Nostalgia"	2012	Raisa	Universal Music Indonesia
"Melangkah"	2013	Raisa	Universal Music Indonesia
"Firasat"	2013	OST Rectoverso	Universal Music Indonesia
"Mantan Terindah"	2013	Yovie and His Friends: Irreplaceable (#takkanterganti)	Yovie Widianto Music Factory
"Bye-Bye"	2014	Heart to Heart	Universal Music Indonesia, Solid Records
"Pemeran Utama"	2014	Heart to Heart	Universal Music Indonesia, Solid Records
"LDR"	2014	Heart to Heart	Universal Music Indonesia, Solid Records
"Teka-Teki"	2015	Heart to Heart	Universal Music Indonesia, Solid Records
"Jatuh Hati"	2015	Handmade	Juni Records
"Percayalah" (with Afgan)	2015	Handmade and Sides	Juni Records, Trinity Optima Production
"Mimpi adalah Harapan"	2015	We Love Disney	Universal Music Indonesia
"Butterfly" (featuring Maruli Tampubolon)	2016	OST Terjebak Nostalgia	MT Production
"Kali Kedua"	2016	Handmade	Juni Records
"Tentang Cinta"	2016	Handmade	Juni Records
"Anganku Anganmu" (with Isyana Sarasvati)	2017	Paradox	Sony Music Entertainment Indonesia, Juni Records
"Usai Di Sini"	2017	Handmade	Juni Records
"Teduhnya Wanita"	2017	OST Ayat-Ayat Cinta 2	MD Music Indonesia
"Lagu Untukmu"	2018	Non-album singles	Juni Records
"Bahasa Kalbu" (with Andi Rianto)	2020	Non-album singles	Sony Music Entertainment Indonesia, Juni Records
"Tunjukkan" (with Afgan)	2020	Non-album singles	Trinity Optima Production, Juni Records
"Ragu"	2021	It's Personal	Juni Records
"Kutukan (Cinta Pertama)"	2021	It's Personal	Juni Records
"Tentang Dirimu"	2021	It's Personal	Juni Records
"You Better Believe Me" (featuring Kara Chenoa)	2021	It's Personal	Juni Records
"Someday" (featuring Sam Kim)	2021	It's Personal	Juni Records
"Cinta Sederhana"	2022	It's Personal	Juni Records

== Filmography ==
Year	Title	Role	Notes
2014	Mantan Terindah	Cameo	Special appearance
2016	Terjebak Nostalgia	Raisa	Lead role
