= Ganbare!! Robocon =

Japanese television series

- Also known as: Robocon
- がんばれ!!ロボコン
- Genre: Tokusatsu; Comedy
- Created by: Shotaro Ishinomori
- Written by: Shozo Uehara
- Directed by: Atsuo Okunaka
- Music by: Shunsuke Kikuchi
- Country of origin: Japan
- Original language: Japanese
- No. of episodes: 118

Production
- Running time: 20–25 minutes
- Production companies: NET; Toei Company

Original release
- Network: ANN (NET)
- Release: October 4, 1974 – March 25, 1977

Ganbare!! Robocon (がんばれ!!ロボコン, Ganbare!! Robokon; Do Your Best!! Robocon) is a Japanese tokusatsu comedy family robot television series created by Shotaro Ishinomori and produced by Toei. It ran from October 4, 1974, to March 25, 1977, on NET TV.

Moero!! Robocon ran from January 31, 1999 (a week after the finale of Tetsuwan Tantei Robotack) to January 23, 2000 (a week before the premiere of Kamen Rider Kuuga). This series joined Kyuukyuu Sentai GoGoFive.

Moero!! Robocon vs. Ganbare!! Robocon (燃えろ!!ロボコンVSがんばれ!!ロボコン, Moero!! Robokon tai Ganbare!! Robokon) December 10, 1999, Toei released the direct to video movie where the Robocon of the 90s meets the original Robocon from the 70s.

In 2006, Cartoon Network planned to develop a Western animated adaptation titled Robocon! The series would have been set in a distant, futuristic metropolis called Neo-Con City. The series never went beyond an animatic pilot.

A recent film Ganbareiwa!! Robocon: Oo-la-la! Lovable Soupless Tantanmen!! Chapter (がんばれいわ!!ロボコン ウララ〜!恋する汁なしタンタンメン!!の巻, Ganbareiwa!! Robokon: Urara~! Koi Suru Shiru-Nashi Tantanmen!! no Maki) was released theatrically on July 31, 2020. It is paired with the anime films Jintai no Survival and Sprin' Pan Mae e Susumō!.

== Plot ==
The titular Robocon is a G-class robot student from the first generation of robot school. He came to the human world for practical training with his friends from robotics school. As a result of a lottery, Robocon will be staying at the Kurihara family in Otara City. Robocon is a bit of a klutz, but he means well and tries to help wherever he can. The story depicts him as someone who strives to become an A-class robot with his "robo guts", even though he gets into various troubles every time. Other robots fill up the cast that each have different jobs assigned to them.

Each day's actions are graded by Mr. Robot Gantz-Sensei, the homeroom teacher at the robot school, and those who score 100 points receive a heart mark. If you collect 10 heart marks, you can graduate from robot school as an A-class robot.

== Characters ==
=== Robots ===
- Robocon (ロボコン, Robokon): A robot who lives amongst humans and aids them as part of his studies at Robot Academy. However, Robocon is a screw-up and is afraid of cockroaches. Fortunately, what he lacks in high-tech, quality and competency, he makes up for in heart. He can transform into the Robocon Car.
- Gantz Teacher (ガンツ先生, Gantsu Sensei): The robot teacher of Robot Academy who built all his student robots, who he accesses via the Scoring Connecter to check their "study" of the week. He teaches various robots to live among humans and help them out with their everyday lives, jobs and duties.
- Robin: A ballerina robot and Robocon's love interest. Her mission is to attend ballet class.
- Robopu: A robot with a teapot for a head.
- Roboinu: A dog-like robot who wears a bucket on his head.
- Robopecha: A medic robot with a medical needle in place of his right hand.
- Robogari: A teacher robot with a lightbulb-shaped head. He always gets a perfect score, which annoys Robocon.
- Roboton: A construction robot with a hammer for a face.
- Robodoro: A frog robot.
- Robosho: A firefighter robot.
- Robopar: A robot who often falls apart when distressed.
- Robokui: A chef robot shaped like an egg.
- Robocar: A car robot that resembles a giant shoe.
- Robochan: A baby robot.
- Robomero: A girl robot.
- Robodeki: A genius robot.
- Robopeke: A kind robot.
- Robopin: A fortune teller robot.
- Roboriki: A gorilla-like muscular robot
- Robochoi:
- Robomecha:
- Robopyon: A rabbit-like robot with a washing machine in his tummy
- Robowaru:
- Robogaki:
- Robogera: A monk-like robot
- Robina:

== Cast ==
- Shintaro Oyama (大山 新太郎, Ōyama Shintarō): Shigehisa Ōno (大野 しげひさ, Ōno Shigehisa)
- Hatsue Oyama (大山 初江, Ōyama Hatsue): Midori Katō (加藤 みどり, Katō Midori)
- Hajime Oyama (大山 はじめ, Ōyama Hajime): Yoshikazu Yamada (山田 芳一, Yamada Yoshikazu)
- Midori Oyama (大山 みどり, Ōyama Midori): Mayumi Sakuma (佐久間 真由美, Sakuma Mayumi)
- Makoto Oyama (大山 まこと, Ōyama Makoto): Nobuyoshi Fukuda (福田 信義, Fukuda Nobuyoshi)
- Robin (ロビン, Robin): Kaho Shimada (島田 歌穂, Shimada Kaho)
- Yukari Yamamoto (山本 ゆかり, Yamamoto Yukari): Yukari Yamamoto (山本 由香利, Yamamoto Yukari)
- Officer Machida (町田巡査, Machida Junsa): Tōru Yuri (由利 徹, Yuri Tōru)
- Taro Ogawa (小川 太郎, Ogawa Tarō): Masahiro Sumiyoshi (住吉 正博, Sumiyoshi Masahiro)
- Yoshiko Ogawa (小川 よし子, Ogawa Yoshiko): Miyuki Ueda (上田 みゆき, Ueda Miyuki)
- Mayumi Ogawa (小川 まゆみ, Ogawa Mayumi): Yukiko Ebina (蝦名 由紀子, Ebina Yukiko)
- Susumu Ogawa (小川 すすむ, Ogawa Susumu): Makoto Iida (飯田 誠, Iida Makoto)
- Mitsuko Kurihara (栗原 光子, Kurihara Mitsuko): Mie (未唯, Mī)
- Momoko Kurihara (栗原 モモコ, Kurihara Momoko): Saori Nara (奈良 沙緒理, Nara Saori)
- Osamu Kurihara (栗原 オサム, Kurihara Osamu): Keisuke Mishima (三嶋 啓介, Mishima Keisuke)
- Jun Kurihara (栗原 ジュン, Kurihara Jun): Jōtarō Koike (小池 城太朗, Koike Jōtarō)
- Gotaro Kurihara (栗原 豪太郎, Kurihara Gōtarō): Ikkei Watanabe (渡辺 いっけい, Watanabe Ikkei)
- Robina (ロビーナ, Robīna): Natsuki Katō (加藤 夏希, Katō Natsuki)

=== Voice cast ===
- Robocon (ロボコン, Robokon): Keiko Yamamoto (山本 圭子, Yamamoto Keiko)
- Robocon (ロボコン, Robokon): Kazue Ikura (伊倉 一恵, Ikura Kazue)
- Gantz-sensei (ガンツ先生, Gantsu-Sensei): Keiichi Noda (野田 圭一, Noda Keiichi)
- Robogari (ロボガリ, Robogari): Sachiko Chijimatsu (千々松 幸子, Chijimatsu Sachiko)
- Robopar (ロボパー, Robopā): Kōji Yada (矢田 耕司, Yada Kōji)
- Robo Mecha (ロボメカ, Robomeka): Kōji Yada (矢田 耕司, Yada Kōji)
- Robowal/Robopu/
- Robopin (ロボピン, Robopin): Ichirō Nagai
- Robodoro/Roboton: Kenichi Ogata
- Roboton (ロボトン, Roboton): Shunji Yamada
- Robosho/Robokiwi/Robochoi: Sanji Hase
- Roboton/Robogaki/Robogera: Osamu Katō
- Robopecha/Robopyon: Kazuko Sawada
- Robowal/Robocar: Yonehiko Kitagawa
- Robodeki: Akira Kamiya
- Robomero: Junko Hori
- Roboinu: Kaneta Kimotsuki/Shun Yashiro
- Roboriki: Hiroshi Masuoka
- Robopeka: Isamu Tanonaka
- Robo-chan (ロボチャン, Robo-chan): Kazuko Sugiyama (杉山 佳寿子, Sugiyama Kazuko)
- Robobin (ロボビン, Robobin): Tomokazu Seki (関 智一, Seki Tomokazu)
- Robo-P (ロボピー, Robopī): Keiko Han (潘 恵子, Han Keiko)
- Robogeta (ロボゲタ, Robogeta): Kaneta Kimotsuki (肝付 兼太, Kimotsuki Kaneta)
- Robokero (ロボケロ, Robokero): Daisuke Sakaguchi (阪口 大助, Sakaguchi Daisuke)
- Robomogu (ロボモグ, Robomogu): Kōji Yusa (遊佐 浩二, Yusa Kōji)
- Roboboss (ロボボス, Robobosu): Kazuki Yao (矢尾 一樹, Yao Kazuki)
- Roboid (ロボイド, Roboido): Hideyuki Hori (堀 秀行, Hori Hideyuki)
- Robogasha (ロボガシャ, Robogasha): Yutaka Asukai (飛鳥井 豊, Asukai Yutaka)
- Robopachi (ロボパチ, Robopachi): Kappei Yamaguchi (山口 勝平, Yamaguchi Kappei)
- Robopuru (ロボプル, Robopuru): Izumi Ōgami (大神 いずみ, Ōgami izumi)

== Episodes ==
1. A Big Hit!! Robo-Guts Fully Unleashed (大当り!! ロボ根性全開, Ōatari!! Robo konjō zenkai)
2. The First Usage (はじめてのおつかい, Hajimeteno otsukai)
3. Big Crisis!! I'm Being Dismantled (大ピンチ!! オイラ解体, Dai pinchi!! Oira kaitai)
4. Perfect! The Devil that Repairs Anything (絶好調! 何でも修理魔, Zekkōchō! Nandemo shūri ma)

== Theme songs ==
All songs were sung by Ichirou Mizuki and composed by Shunsuke Kikuchi.

- OP 1: Ganbare Robocon, written by Shotaro Ishinomori
- OP 2: Oira Robocon Robotto dai! (おいらロボコンロボットだい!) by Shotaro Ishinomori
- ED 1: Robocon, Best in the Robot World (ロボコン・ロボット世界一, Robokon Robotto Sekaiichi) written by Saburō Yatsude
- ED 2: Robocon Gattsurakon (ロボコンガッツラコン) by Saburō Yatsude
- Summer ED: Robocon Ondo (ロボコン音頭) by Saburō Yatsude
- Winter ED: Run! Robocon Athletic Meet (走れ!!ロボコン運動会, Hashire! Robokon Undōkai) by Shotaro Ishinomori

== Dubbing ==
The second series was dubbed into Arabic by Venus Centre and was aired on the channel Spacetoon. It became a hit in the Middle East, the theme song in the Arabic version was performed by Rasha Rizk
