= Entertainment News =

2013–2019 Indonesian TV news program

- Created by: Gista Putri; Wishnutama
- Developed by: Gista Putri; Wishnutama
- Presented by: Shafira Umm; Temmy Rahadi; Caesar Gunawan; Aubry Beer; Maria Sabta; Ganindra Bimo; Deva Mahenra
- Country of origin: Indonesia
- Original language: Indonesian

Production
- Production locations: The East Building, Kuningan, Jakarta, Indonesia
- Running time: 60 Minutes
- Production company: NET. Entertainment

Original release
- Network: NET.
- Release: 18 May 2013 – 4 June 2019

Related
- Good Afternoon

Entertainment News is a flagship television news Entertainment program formatting infotainment which contains interesting news from the world of entertainment at home and abroad based on facts and information that broadcasts on the Indonesian TV station NET. This program also discusses news from the world of music, film, fashion, art, biography and event organizers. And this program has the motto "No Gossip", this is in accordance with the contents of the programs.

Entertainment News was created on 18 May 2013, by Gista Putri and Wishnutama. To greet all viewers, every articles reading always begins with "Good People" (best people), not "Pemirsa" (viewer) till present. Entertainment News is created with many crews, with other crews including Wishnutama, Roan Y. Anprira, Agus Lasmono Sudwikatmono and Gista Putri.

Entertainment News has won 2 times Indonesian Broadcaster Commissions Awards (Anugerah Komisi Penyiaran Indonesia) on 2015 & 2016.

== Programs ==
- Access Hollywood (Syndication from, United States)
- Dish Nation (Syndication from, United States)
- Entertainment Tonight (Syndication from, United States)
- E! News (E!, United States)
- The Gossip Table (VH1, United States)
- Melodi (TV3, Malaysia)
- Pop TV Express/POP TV (NTV7, Malaysia)
- Hlive (Astro Ria and Astro Ria HD, Malaysia)
- MeleTOP (Astro Ria and Astro Ria HD, Malaysia)

== Hosts ==
- Shafira Umm
- Temmy Rahadi
- Caesar Gunawan
- Aubry Beer
- Maria Sabta
- Ganindra Bimo
- Deva Mahenra

=== Former hosts ===
- Dominique Diyose
- Gista Putri (now begin roles at sitcom The East)

== Achievements and nominations ==
Years	Awards	Nominations	Results
2014	Yahoo! Celebrity Awards 2014	Best Infotainment Programs	Nominated
2015	Anugerah Komisi Penyiaran Indonesia 2015	Program Infotainmen Terbaik	Won
2016	Anugerah Komisi Penyiaran Indonesia 2016	Program Infotainmen Terbaik	Won
