= Gista Putri =

Indonesian actress (born 1987)

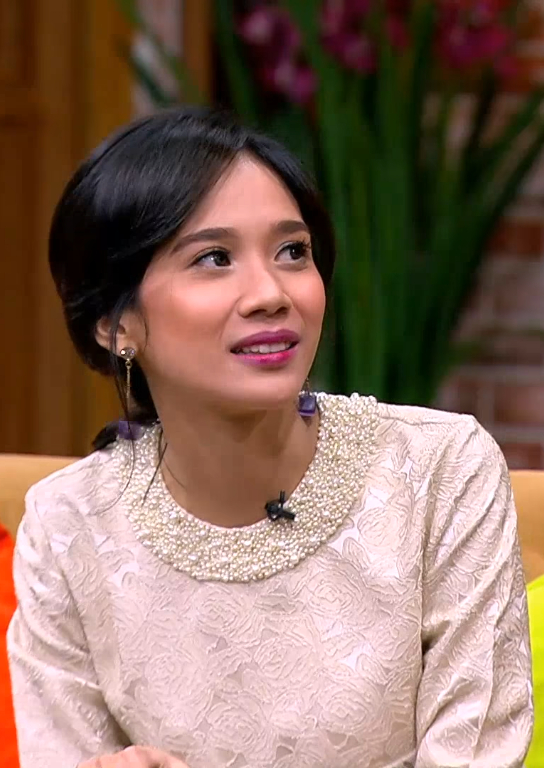
- Born: August 2, 1987 (age 38); Jakarta, Indonesia
- Occupations: Celebrity, Presenter
- Years active: 2008 - present
- Spouse: Wishnutama (m. 2015)
- Children: Salima Putri Tama
- Parents: Agusdin Susanto; Susilowati

Gista Putri (born in Jakarta, 2 August 1987) is an Indonesian actress and presenter.

== Early life ==
Gista Putri is of Sundanese descent from her parents Agusdin Susanto and Susilowati from Kuningan, West Java, in Sawahwaru. She holds a law degree from the Faculty of Law, Trisakti University, Jakarta.

== Career ==
Gista Putri began her career as a model in a teen magazine. After she became a finalist in a teen magazine model event, she received further offers to take part in various photoshoots and was cast in several music videos.

She made her film debut while finishing her studies. Gista Putri appeared in the role of Laras, with the actors Ira Wibowo, Sophie Navita, Christian Bautista and Maribeth in the film Simfoni Luar Biasa, a story of children with special needs.

Since 2014, she has hosted music and entertainment programs on NET television station, and has appeared in the sitcoms Keluarga Masa Kini and The East.

On 20 September 2015, she married Wishnutama Kusubandio, Ceo of NET. Mediatama Televisi.

== Filmography ==
=== Movies ===
- Simfoni Luar Biasa (2011)

=== Sitcom ===
- The Coffee Bean Show
- Keluarga Masa Kini
- The East

=== Advertisements ===
- Simpati Freedom Telkomsel

=== Quiz ===
- Super Family

=== Presenter ===
- Entertainment News (2013 - 2015)

== FTV serials ==
- Mengejar Cinta Olga RCTI
- Mengejar Cinta Olga (Lagi) RCTI
- Antara Mars, Venus, Dan Boo RCTI
- Kolak Cinta Aisah RCTI
- Jodoh Buat Romo SCTV
- Cewek Jagoan Malioboro SCTV
- Jadikan Aku Cinta Terakhirmu SCTV
- Pembantuku Jago Kungfu SCTV
- I Love 21 SCTV
- Menjemput Cintaku Kembali SCTV
- Pacaran Seminggu SCTV
- Jamu Gendong Gina SCTV
- Gadis Manis Dalam Taxi SCTV
- Haruskah Ku Bilang Cinta Pada Selly SCTV
- Nada Cinta Dari Terminal SCTV
- Cinta Super Jadul SCTV
- Calon Istri Yang Sempurna SCTV
- Jodoh Pasti Bertemu SCTV
- Aku Takut Bilang Cinta Padamu SCTV
- Ku Lihat Cinta Di Matanya SCTV
- Diam-Diam Aku Suka Dia SCTV

== Music videos model ==
- Noah - Separuh Aku
- Ada Band - Sendiri
- VC HEYHO - Stasiun Tua
- Sherina - Pergilah Kau
- Emily - Permaisuriku (Starlite)
- ST 12 - Cinta Tak Harus Memiliki
- D'Bagindas - Tak Seindah Malam kemarin
- Naff - Tak Butuh Jawaban
- Rossa - Ku Menunggu
- Salju - Permaisuriku
- Repvblik - Aku Yang Terluka
