= Spacetoon =

Arab television network channel

- Logo used since 2020
- Country: United Arab Emirates, Syria, Indonesia, South Korea, India, Ukraine, Turkey
- Broadcast area: Arab world Ukraine; Indonesia; South Korea; India; Turkey
- Headquarters: Damascus, Syria (formerly); Dubai, UAE

Programming
- Languages: Arabic (Arab world); English (Arab world and India); Indonesian (Indonesia); Ukrainian (Ukraine); Korean (South Korea); Hindi (India); Turkish (Turkey)
- Picture format: 576i (4:3 - 16:9 SDTV)
- Timeshift service: Malyatko TV (2009–2010) (Formerly Spacetoon Малятко)

Ownership
- Owner: Spacetoon International
- Sister channels: Spacetoon English; Spacetoon Radio; Space Power (SPTV)

History
- Launched: 15 March 2000; 26 years ago (Arabic channel); 24 March 2005; 21 years ago (Indonesian channel); 1 April 2005; 21 years ago (English channel); October 2005; 21 years ago (Korean channel); 15 January 2009; 17 years ago (Indian channel); 2009; 17 years ago (Korean channel, revival); 31 December 2009; 16 years ago (Ukrainian channel); 18 May 2013; 13 years ago (Indonesian channel, satellite); 13 January 2025; 22 months ago (Turkish channel)
- Founder: Fayez Al-Sabbagh
- Closed: 4 November 2007; 19 years ago (Korean channel, original); 25 March 2010; 16 years ago (Ukrainian channel); 1 January 2011; 15 years ago (English channel); 15 November 2011; 14 years ago (Korean channel, revival); 2011; 15 years ago (Indian channel); 17 May 2013; 13 years ago (Indonesia, terrestrial); 1 February 2023; 3 years ago (Indonesia, satellite)
- Replaced by: Malyatko TV (Ukraine); NET. (Indonesia, on terrestrial); Spacetoon Indonesia (launch as a channel on Telkom-1 satellite, it was listed as Spacetoon 1)

Links
- Website: spacetoon.com

Availability (channel space shared with Space Power in Arab world only)

Streaming media
- Live Stream: Spacetoon Arabic

Spacetoon (Arabic: سبيستون or سبيس تون) is a free-to-air television channel that specializes in animation and children programs. It began broadcasting on 15 March 2000 in Bahrain TV, and it is currently headquartered in Dubai. The channel targets children from 4 and up. Its night block, Space Power, is targeted at teenagers and young adults. The Spacetoon company also maintains a video-on-demand app called Spacetoon Go.

The Spacetoon company has had two now-defunct channels in the Arab world, Space Power TV and Spacetoon English.

In Indonesia, the main channel began airing on 24 March 2005 in Jakarta. It later became NET., and its broadcast remained on satellite television until 2023. There are two now-defunct Spacetoon channels in Indonesia: Spacetoon and Spacetoon Plus. In India, Spacetoon India exists as licensing company, but not as a separate TV channel. In South Korea, Spacetoon launched in 2005 but has since closed down. In Ukraine, Spacetoon Malyatko was launched as a replacement for Malyatko TV on 31 December 2009 until it reverted back on 25 March 2010. In Turkey, Spacetoon Turkey released Spacetoon Go app on 12 December 2024, and launched its TV channel on 13 January 2025.

Spacetoon is currently broadcast in 23 countries, and has an audience of over 130 million viewers.

== History ==
In 1999, Bahrain Radio and Television Corporation officially signed an agreement to broadcast a children's cartoon channel. On 15 March 2000, Spacetoon began test broadcasting in Damascus, Syria, as a seven-hour block on Bahrain TV. It continued to air this way until the contract ended on 12 January 2002, according to a statement issued by the Ministry. Later, in 2004, Spacetoon moved its headquarters to Dubai and was established as an independent television channel on Nilesat in 2002.

In the Arab world, the majority of programs are dubbed in modern standard Arabic. Spacetoon is very closely affiliated with Venus Centre, a Syrian dubbing company which has historically provided the Arabic dubbed versions of the programming, and whose voice actors usually were the announcers for the shows between the years 2000–2015. Using modern standard Arabic in dubbing played a crucial role in maintaining the use of the dialect in childhood, which was especially significant given the context of emerging spoken Arabic dialects.

== Programming ==
=== Planets ===
Programming is categorized into sections marketed as planets, one for each genre:

- Action Planet (كوكب أکشن) for action series. (Example: Dragon Ball)
- Sport Planet (كوكب رياضة) for sport series. (Example: Captain Tsubasa, localized as “Captain Majid”)
- Adventure Planet (كوكب مغامرات) for adventure series. (Example: Kimba the White Lion)
- Comedy Planet (كوكب كوميديا) for comedy series. (Example: Looney Tunes)
- Movies Planet (كوكب أفلام) for movies. (Example: Anastasia)
- Abjad Planet (كوكب أبجد) for educational programs. (Example: Barney & Friends)
- Bon Bon Planet (كوكب بون بون) for preschool programs. (Example: Tama and Friends)
- History Planet (كوكب تاريخ) (former, 2000–2013) for history series. (Example: Liberty's Kids)
- Science Planet (كوكب علوم) for science series. (Example: Operation Ouch!)
- Zomoroda Planet (كوكب زمردة) (means "emerald" in Arabic) for programs targeted towards girls. (Example: My Little Pony: Friendship Is Magic)

=== Blocks ===
- Spacetoon Treasures for classic programs.
- Spacetoon Mum for parenting guidance and programs suitable for toddlers.
- Space Power for programs targeted towards teenagers and adults.

== Music ==
A large foundation of Spacetoon included the theme songs. The songs were not direct translations from the original series, but rather original songs that related to a major theme in the show. The individuals most attributed to Spacetoon's theme songs are Tarek Alarabi Tourgane and Rasha Rizk. Along with other composers and writers, their mission was to reflect the importance of morals and qualities through each verse. They believed the meanings and words of these songs will contribute to building strong character for their young audience. As Tarek Tourgane said in an interview "I believe that the child is not satisfied with the song melody itself, but the ability to absorb the meanings and words to be part of building his character."

=== Palestine Resistance ===
Although Spacetoon did not originally intend to include politically charged messaging in their music, fans of the program took it upon themselves to take the songs from their childhood and stand with Palestinian solidarity. This was done by a group of Yemeni artists with a video titled "Medley Palestine" which can be found on YouTube.

== Dubbing ==
Spacetoon follows a strict policy towards dubbing its shows, trying as much as possible to make the lip synchronization accurate to that of the speaker. Voice actors represented various nationalities in the Arab world, however, because of the strict use of Modern Standard Arabic, the audience could not differentiate the dialect. This was part of Spacetoon's mission to strengthen the language among the youth and to bridge the gap between the dialects.

== Censorship ==
Programs aired on Spacetoon sometimes have aspects that are censored from their source material. In particular, scenes can be cropped or truncated in order to avoid showing excessive violence to viewers. This has been seen in programs such as Detective Conan, Romeo's Blue Skies, Hunter × Hunter and My Hero Academia. Hunter × Hunter was also subject to the censorship of the depiction of Zen Buddhism and Taoism as related to the characters' powers, with the censored version opting to present their powers as a science and martial art. Selective cropping and editing are also used to hide cleavages (like Momo Yaoyorozu's costume in My Hero Academia) and remove innuendo (like Minoru Mineta's perverted personality in My Hero Academia). In some programs, nudity, and negative words are censored. For example, in Doraemon, Shizuka's panties scene and nudity scene were censored. In Kiteretsu Daihyakka, the word "girlfriend" was changed to sister, while Miyoko's panties scene and nudity scenes were censored. Religious symbols have also been censored in some programs. For example, in My Little Pony: Friendship Is Magic, Twilight Sparkle's six-pointed star was censored by cutting off one of its points because it looked like the Star of David.

== International channels ==
Channel	Country	Launch year	Shutdown year	Replaced by
Current
Spacetoon Arabic	Arab League	15 March 2000 (test broadcast, block on Bahrain TV); 2 August 2000 (official launch, block on Bahrain TV); 14 January 2002 (independent channel)		
Spacetoon Turkey	Turkey	13 January 2025 (test broadcast); 19 May 2025 (official launch)		
Former
Spacetoon English	Arab League	1 April 2005	1 January 2011	Discontinued
Spacetoon India	India	November 2005 (block on Sahara One); 15 January 2009 (TV channel)	2011 (TV channel)	Discontinued
Spacetoon India	Pakistan	November 2005 (block on Sahara One); 15 January 2009 (TV channel)	2011 (TV channel)	Discontinued
Spacetoon Korea	South Korea	October 2005; 2009 (IPTV)	4 November 2007; 15 November 2011 (IPTV)	Discontinued
Malyatko TV (Spacetoon Malyatko)	Ukraine	31 December 2009 (as Spacetoon); 25 March 2010 (as Malayatko TV)	25 March 2010 (as Spacetoon); 1 July 2023 (as Malayatko TV)	Discontinued
Spacetoon Indonesia	Indonesia	1 February 2005 (test broadcast); 25 March 2005 (official launch); 18 May 2013 (satellite)	17 May 2013 (terrestrial); 1 February 2023 (satellite)	NET. (terrestrial)
Spacetoon Plus	Indonesia	1 February 2014; 2016 (UseeTV, IPTV); August 2020 (Asiasat-9 satellite)	28 June 2020 (UseeTV, IPTV); 1 February 2023 (Asiasat-9 satellite)	Discontinued
SpaceShopping (Spacetoon 2)	Indonesia	6 September 2014	27 August 2017	Spacetoon Indonesia (Palapa-D satellite)
Spacetoon 3	Indonesia	May 2016	October 2016	Discontinued
SpaceDrama (Spacetoon Drama)	Indonesia	May 2017	November 2017	Discontinued

=== English ===
Spacetoon
- Broadcast area: Arab world
- Headquarters: Dubai, UAE

Programming
- Languages: English; Arabic (2009–2011)

Ownership
- Owner: Spacetoon International
- Sister channels: Spacetoon; Space Power (SPTV)

History
- Launched: 1 April 2005; 21 years ago
- Closed: 1 January 2011; 15 years ago

On 1 April 2005, Spacetoon launched a second channel for the English-speakers in the region. The shows were aired in English, while some were aired in Arabic with English subtitles. It was broadcast from 11 a.m. to 8 p.m. After developments had taken place on the channel, it transmitted from 9 a.m. to 9 p.m. The channel suddenly and temporarily stopped broadcasting on Wednesday, 19 August 2009, at 6 p.m. for a week, and returned to the air on Wednesday, 26 August 2009. From then on, it broadcast from 2 p.m. to 7:15 p.m.

On 1 January 2011, Spacetoon English closed down.

=== Indonesia ===
Spacetoon
- Indonesia Stock Exchange Tower 2nd Floor (Jakarta) Banten (until 2013); Indonesia
- Branding: Spacetoon Indonesia

Programming
- Network: KTV (2018–2023) TATV (2019–2023)

Ownership
- Owner: H. Sukoyo
- Sister stations: Spacetoon Plus (2014–2023) Previously: TV-M (2013); Alam TV (2010–2013); Cirebon TV (2015); ADI TV (2016–2020)

History
- Founded: 8 November 2003; 23 years ago
- First air date: 1 February 2005; 21 years ago (test broadcast); 25 March 2005; 21 years ago (official broadcast); 18 May 2013; 13 years ago (satellite)
- Last air date: 17 May 2013; 13 years ago (terrestrial); 1 February 2023; 3 years ago (satellite)
- Former affiliations: Various

Links
- Website: spacetoon.id

In Indonesia, Spacetoon officially launched on 25 March 2005. The network was founded by H. Sukoyo, co-founder of TV7. When it was launched, Spacetoon broadcast from 6 a.m. to 9:30 p.m. WIB. Later, broadcast timings were extended from 5 a.m. to 11 p.m. When programming ended, a 10-minute section filled with animation, songs, or messages for children was shown. During mid-2011, due to financial problems, Spacetoon began broadcasting some home-shopping programs and alternative medicine programs.

In March 2013, 95% of Spacetoon ownership stakes were acquired by Net Visi Media. The reason of this is Spacetoon International no longer wanted to be associated with Spacetoon Indonesia because after the death of H. Sukoyo, H. Sukoyo's confidant took away all of its money amounting to Rp 7.5 billion, and the person has fled abroad without a trace at all. However, the case was not reported to the authorities because the embezzlement of funds had been covered by the new owner and declared "finished".

On 18 May 2013, Spacetoon officially moved to satellite television, due to NET. having a test broadcast on terrestrial network before it was officially launched a week later.

In September 2014, Spacetoon split into two channels: Spacetoon and Spacetoon 2. Spacetoon 2 broadcast more cartoon and animation than Spacetoon, although it still broadcast some home-shopping programs. In May 2016, Spacetoon added another channel, Spacetoon 3. It had clearer audio than Spacetoon and Spacetoon 2, but was closed down on October of the same year. In November 2016, Spacetoon 2 was renamed as Space Shopping due to the home shopping programmes contributing the most revenue to the channel, which overall had little income.

In 2017, Spacetoon launched Spacedrama (also known as Spacetoon Drama), a channel aims to air Indonesian drama series. The channel was later closed down.

On 1 February 2023, Spacetoon and Spacetoon Plus silently left Telkom-1 and Asiasat-9 satellites respectively, marking the end of Spacetoon's broadcast after 18 years of its launch, whereas two years later, the original free terrestrial TV channel spaces of what was known as Spacetoon is now occupied by MDTV.

=== India ===
Spacetoon India is an Indian media and licensing company. It was established in 2006. Spacetoon has more than 70 licensing deals, including for Crayon Shin-chan, Doraemon and Hello Kitty. The company also creates original intellectual property, including Fafa & Juno.

In November 2005, Spacetoon partnered with Sahara One to create Spacetoon Hour, an hour-long broadcast of animated and live action series culled from SpaceToon Media Group's library. The broadcast was later cancelled.

In 2009, Spacetoon launched a free-to-air channel in India. Broadcasting was later discontinued. Its website was shut down in 2015.

=== South Korea ===
Spacetoon officially launched in October 2005. It was transmitted through Sky Life and some local cable broadcasting, but it stopped broadcasting on 4 November 2007 due to low channel awareness. Some of its programs aired on Alice TV and Magic TV in 2007. It relaunched in the first half of 2009 through IPTV, but it was discontinued in 2011.

=== Ukraine ===
On 31 December 2009, the Ukrainian kids channel, Malyatko TV (Ukrainian: Малятко TV), changed its logo and its name to Spacetoon Malyatko (Ukrainian: Spacetoon Малятко) at midnight. The differences is that there were Christmas variants of the 10 planets and their theme songs. The shows also were dubbed in Ukrainian.

On 25 March 2010, Spacetoon Malyatko changed its name to Malyatko TV. The reason for the termination of cooperation was failure of partners to fulfill their obligations.

On 16 June 2023, Malyatko TV abruptly ceased broadcasting digitally, shortly after on 1 July, satellite and OTT platforms ceased broadcasting.

On 14 September 2023, the relevant Ukrainian authorities canceled the station's permit to broadcast. The primary reason provided was the station's lack of ability to pay for the broadcast fees. Malyatko TV was subsequently fined on 9 May 2024 for an unknown amount, for an unscheduled broadcast interruption.

=== Turkey ===
Spacetoon
- Country: Turkey
- Broadcast area: Turkey; Azerbaijan
- Headquarters: Istanbul, Turkey

Programming
- Language: Turkish
- Picture format: 16:9 (720p, HDTV)

Ownership
- Owner: Spacetoon International

History
- Launched: 13 January 2025; 22 months ago (test broadcast); 19 May 2025; 17 months ago (official launch)

Links
- Website: spacetoon.com.tr

Availability

Terrestrial
- Türksat 4A: 12379 V 27500 3/4
- Tivibu: Channel 117
- Digiturk: Channel 166
- D-Smart: Channel 130
- KabloTV: Channel 448

Streaming media
- Turkcell TV+: Channel 135
- Tivibu: Channel 117

On 26 June 2024, It was announced that Spacetoon International plans to launch its TV channel, Spacetoon Go app, and Spacetoon Pictures for theatrical releases in Turkey.

Spacetoon Go app was released on Google Play on 12 December 2024, then it released on App Store on 30 December 2024, with a different interface compared to the Arabic feed.

On 13 January 2025, the channel started its test broadcast silently on Türksat 4A. It is launched on D-Smart on 16 January 2025, and Turkcell TV+ on 21 January 2025, and S Sport Plus on 22 January 2025, and Tivibu on 7 May 2025, and Digiturk and KabloTV on 4 June 2025. It officially launched on 19 May 2025.

It is the first feed that uses high-definition, and has updated graphics and different idents for the third identity. It is also the only feed that doesn't include History Planet since its removal from the Arabic feed in March 2013.

== See also ==
- Animation International
- Game Power 7, game publisher owned by Spacetoon
