= The East (TV series) =

- Genre: Sitcom; Workplace
- Starring: Lukman Sardi; Sutan Simatupang; Ayushita; Sahira Anjani; Gista Putri; Tara Basro; Caesar Gunawan; Shafira Umm; Aubry Beer; Ge Pamungkas; Tanta Ginting; Julie Estelle; Karina Salim; Laura Theux; Achmad Megantara; Adinda Thomas; Fajar Nugraha; Dea Rizkita; Twindy Rarasati; Ardit Erwanda; Ridwan Remin
- Country of origin: Indonesia
- No. of seasons: 2
- No. of episodes: 420

Production
- Executive producer: Nur Asfin Mardini
- Producer: Nucky Rozandy
- Production locations: The East Building, Jakarta
- Running time: 60 minutes
- Production companies: Seribu Layar Sinema; NET. Entertainment

Original release
- Release: 31 January 2015 – 2 June 2019

The East is an Indonesian situation comedy programme that aired on NET. The title is named as "The East" for the namesake of the building where the headquarters of NET. is located in Jakarta, Indonesia.

== Premise ==
The series depicts the situation behind the scenes of the station's in-house infotainment program called Entertainment News as well as the personal situation of its crew. The talents involved here portray those who prepare the program, such as its executive producer, producer, creative, production assistant, reporter, and camera person. and lastly, the hosts who present the Entertainment News program.

=== Continuity ===
The sitcom reached 420 episodes just before the celebration of Eid Mubarak 2019. However, after that, the production of the sitcom came to a halt. In July 2019, it had been one month since the release of the 420th episode. Still, there is no clear confirmation whether this sitcom has come to an end or will resume production.

== Characters ==
The program is set to show the production process of the Entertainment News (E-News) program, where there are presenters for the show, those who work behind the scenes, and managerial positions who supervise talents and the progress of the show. Both are also the presenter of the real Entertainment News program alongside Gista Putri. Other presenters sometimes fill-in for the show.

=== Presenters ===
- Shafira Umm as Shafira, the female presenter of E-News. She is cheerful, confident, and fashionable.
- Caesar Gunawan as Caesar, the male presenter of E-News who boasts himself for being "the most handsome guy" on the show.
- Aubry Beer as Aubry, the fellow female presenter of E-News. She is bright, pretty and full of passion.

=== Behind the scenes ===
- Gista Putri as Gista, the producer of E-News and later on, 86. She sometimes fills in as the presenter for E-News. Hygienic and organized, she usually turns down Andika's affection and gets irritated by Mutia. Gista would later become an executive producer replacing Mutia position.
- Sahira Anjani as Iren, the junior reporter who often goes out to report with Fajar and who briefs the presenters about the stories for the day's broadcast. Innocent and sometimes clumsy, she is always bullied by Fajar by asking for money and is called on by Mutia and Andika as being incompetent, but always finds consolation to Putri and unbeknownst to anyone, have martial art skills.
- Tanta Ginting as Fajar, a cameraman who is the enemy of the crew for frequently asking for money, boastful, and sleeping on the job. He primarily bullies Iren and Andika by owing them plenty of money which he always promises to pay back at a later date. He does not work under supervision of Dhewo because he is often called to shoot for other programs.

=== Managerial positions ===
- Sutan Simatupang as Dhewo, the Head of Production Department. Short tempered and loud, he is in charge of every single crew of all shows. He is in love with Mutia but fails to ask her for a date on all but one occasion, as well as unwillingly say a word of his affection for her.
- Dwi Sasono as Dwi, the Head of Production Departement (Season 2). A calm and slow talking guy. Some of his employees sought him as a charismatic person who can lead the team and gets the job done.
- Verdi Solaiman as Verdi, the Head of Production Departement (Season 3). A very experienced person who has been working in the TV industry for years especially abroad in South Korea. He's very strict to schedule and also apparently had OCD.
- Lukman Sardi as Lukman, the director who is stern but more tight-lipped and philosophical, thus often misunderstood by Dhewo. His favorite catchphrase is "Zero mistakes!"
- Julie Estelle as Claudia, the Head Division of Talent Management. Artists who come to the TV station to try their luck of landing a gig must see her to make an appointment for casting. She is known for eating healthily and being likable.
- Veronica Jalah Laissti Timuran as Laissti, the Director Assistant who works as the secretary for Lukman. Also in real life is the Personal Assistant to the NET. ex-CEO Wishnutama.

== Crews ==
=== Season 1 ===
- Tara Basro as Mutia, the executive producer who handles the program on the set. Very stern and straightforward, a few of her colleagues are often irritated because of her attitude. She always unwittingly turns down Dhewo's offer for a night out. In the early episodes, Iren often follows her and writes down about how not to pester her when she gets pissed with Iren for doing so.
- Ge Pamungkas as Andika, an assistant producer whose job description includes booking equipments for outdoor reporting and checking on footages for the broadcast. Clumsy and a bootlicker, he has a deep affection for Gista and a deep friendship with Fajar, both of which often put him on the losing side. The only positive side on him is frequently contributing applicable ideas for the show.
- Ayushita as Putri, the creative and senior reporter who has the contact number of most prospective artists for interview. Calm, cheerful, and stylish, she is Gista and Iren's best friend.

=== Season 2 ===
- Karina Salim as Karin, executive producer for Ini Talkshow. She's very disciplined and competitive and considered as frenemy to Gista.
- Achmad Megantara as Bima, executive producer for Tonight Show. A handsome guy in the office but sometimes also clumsy and takes advantage of girls in the office who admired him. Bima grew wiser and calmer in later episodes.
- Adinda Thomas as Vira, also a part of Gista's creative team. A cheerful individual but also clumsy and had sensitive feelings about everything. She had a crush on Fajar, the camera guy.
- Twindy Rarasati as Clarissa, a smart, motivated and well-prepared individual. She's the part of Karin's creative team.
- Fajar Nugraha as Tomo, a production assistant replacing Bebi who have been moved to a different creative team. Tomo had special feelings to Vira who later they become a close friend.

=== Season 3 ===
- Ardhit Erwandha as Adit, production assistant to Gista (Season 3). He gets the jobs done but sometimes can be distracted especially when Clarissa is around.
- Dea Rizkita as Dea, a junior production assistant to Karin. She always had something with makeups and online shopping. Sometimes she forgot her responsibility and tasks because of that.

== Other casts ==
These casts are usually labeled as "Featuring" on the opening credit and is slated to play in multiple episodes.

- Ferry Gustian as Eman (Office Boy) (Episodes 1–8)
- Adhry Budiarsha as Ikin (Office Boy) (From Episode 9). He chuckles a lot and inadvertently interrupts Dhewo's pick-up line for Mutia while delivering his coffee.
- Scott Leonard as Marcel, the temporary production assistant while Andika is on leave.
- Samuel Rizal as Jose, another camera person who is adored by Iren.
- Laura Theux as Bebi, a new intern who unwittingly has a feeling for Andika.
- Ridwan Remin as Sobirin (Office Boy) (Episodes 400-now)

== Special Guest Star ==
- Mathias Muchus
- Dian Sastrowardoyo
- Yuki Kato
- Brandon Nicholas Salim
- Boy William
- Sophia Latjuba
- Sheryl Sheinafia
- Wulan Guritno
- Nunung
- Baim Wong
- Julie Estelle
- Jill Gladys
- Restu Sinaga
- Chef Aiko
- DJ Yasmin
- Gisella Anastasia
- AKP Torsiadi Jamal
- Brigadir Dara Intan
- Brigadir Eka Frestya
- Putri Titian
- Winky Wiryawan
- Nadia Vega
- Pevita Pearce
- Armand Maulana
- Wishnutama
- Rio Dewanto
- Tasya Kamila
- Tina Toon
- Chiquita Meidy
- Prisia Nasution
- Seto Mulyadi
- Hedy Yunus
- Atiqah Hasiholan
- Isyana Sarasvati
- Kombespol Istiono
- Iptu Indra Putra
- Brigadir Herlina Swandi
- Sarah Sechan
- Kirana Larasati
- Budi Doremi
- Nirina Zubir
- Samuel Rizal
- Tora Sudiro
- Melly Goeslaw & Anto Hoed
- Cherrybelle
- Barli Asmara
- Tarra Budiman
- Kelas International Cast
- Sule
- Andre Taulany
- Mang Saswi
- Desta
- Vincent Ryan Rompies
- Imam Darto
- Dimas Danang
- Twinda Rarasati
- Shinta Naomi
- Temmy Rahadi
- Caesar Gunawan
- Garindra Bimo
- Maria Sabta
- Shafira Umm
- Deva Mahendra
- Aubry Beer
- Sita Nursanti
- Adinda Thomas
- Sheila Dara Aisha
- Paramitha Rusady

== Episodes ==
Unless otherwise stated, any special guests on each episode are acting as themselves, usually as the interviewee for the day's report.

No.	Title	Original release date
1	"Perdana (Pilot)"	31 January 2015
The production team falsely plays a footage about marriage while the story is about a divorce, scrambling everyone into confusion and scolding. Meanwhile, Fajar never gets a chance to eat as he repeatedly bumps into people, dropping his snack multiple times. Special guest: Dian Sastrowardoyo as the director
2	"Gagal Fokus (Fail to Focus)"	1 February 2015
Andika looks for Iren and her report for much of the day, only to be found given to Gista, but nonetheless was submitted in time for the show. Elsewhere, Dhewo fails his attempts at putting and Fajar never gets to eat again because of interventions.
3	"Boss Baru (New Boss)"	7 February 2015
The company welcomes its new director called Lukman and the crew must prepare a welcoming party for him, which turn out to be not as expected. In another story, Fajar is so chronically sleepy he wakes up to another meeting in the same room he fell asleep, in addition to upsetting Iren for forcing her to bring the camera and everyone for asking for money.
4	"Salah Sangka (Misinterpreted)"	8 February 2015
Putri listens to Dhewo's story as a widower, to which she misinterprets as being asked to marry him, while Gista is frantic after misunderstanding Dhewo's phone call. Iren forgets an instruction given by Mutia to ask Andika for materials for the show, while Fajar suffers mishaps with his new bag.
5	"Jemput Tamu (Fetching The Guest)"	14 February 2015
The crew invites Mathias Mucus as an interviewee for the show, but is repeatedly put back by his many requests as they are picking him up, resulting in a replacement guest already booked as he arrived. Meanwhile Fajar nearly misses work because he lost his roster. Special guest: Mathias Muchus
6	"Menang Kuis (Win a Quiz)"	15 February 2015
Fajar wins a quiz held by Entertainment News where he was allegedly not allowed to join for being part of the show's crew, thus he has to cover up to claim the price. Elsewhere, Iren looks for tips on dealing with her boss while Andika tries to convince Gista that he obeys Mutia out of respect instead of fear, after a minor confrontation with her.
7	"Error"	21 February 2015
Caesar is criticized for subpar commenting while filling in for an unplayable footage about Yuki Kato on the show, taking fellow presenter Shafira into trouble as well. Iren and Fajar redo the footage which ends up at themselves caught on camera mocking their boss, while Andika is ultimately to be blamed for failing to edit it and for deleting footages from other programs at the station's storage. Special guest: Yuki Kato
8	"Higienis (Hygienic)"	22 February 2015
Gista left her meal unfinished after seeing Fajar's unhygienic table manners, fainting her after shooting for the show. But Andika's attempt of reviving her by buying her a meal failed.
9	"Anak Baru (The New Kid)"	28 February 2015
Dhewo intends to recruit several new talents and the crew decides to hold an audition. Brandon, one of the participants, bets to wear his freakish costume for 2 days to get accepted, but not before scaring a few and ultimately ends up resigning from the job. Special guest: Brandon Nicholas Salim
10	"Pengakuan (Confession)"	1 March 2015
Fajar and Andika got an opportunity to hear Sophia Latjuba's confession on the set of her real TV show, Tetangga Masa Gitu, but not without their own mishaps that ends up at the footage being horribly messed up and miserably failed to do another attempt of interviewing her. In the office, Iren is too happy that Mutia is back from vacation, she follows wherever Mutia goes. Special guest:Sophia Latjuba
11	"Undangan (Invitation)"	March 7, 2015
Fajar and Andika are crossed for not being invited to Iren's birthday dinner, which turned out not to be the Iren they frequently meet. Meanwhile Putri, who was invited, was caught lying for being sick in order to leave meeting early.
12	"Berubah (Change)"	March 8, 2015
Two of NET's music show Breakout's presenters are severely fighting before their show, in which Mutia intervenes to calm their temper down by letting them sing a song. Meanwhile, Andika's change of personality in favor of Gista fails to impress her. Special guests: Boy William, Sheryl Sheinafia
13	"Sidak (Unannounced Inspection)"	March 15, 2015
An unannounced inspection by Lukman regarding uniform tidiness caught Andika and Fajar at fault after Andika voluntarily exchanged his wet uniform with Fajar's. Iren is mightily concern about losing her weight while Dhewo mistakenly asks Mutia to book a room for a meeting instead of a table for dinner.
14	"Bonus (Reward)"	March 21, 2015
Wulan comes to Dhewo to sell real estate, while Andika is looking forward to buy one but does not have enough money even after getting his bonus, which pissed her so bad. Fajar got a bonus as well but evades from paying debt owed by Iren, while Dhewo mistakenly eats fish food instead of peanuts while meeting Lukman. Special guest: Wulan Guritno
15	"Pulsa (Balance)"	March 22, 2015
Andika, who is the producer in charge, wants to schedule an interview for Nunung but his phone number does not have enough balance to make a call. He also fails to prepare two important questions as requested by his boss to be submitted for interview. Meanwhile, Fajar tricks Andika and Iren by promising to fill their balance, in which the money given by them goes to his pocket instead.Special guest: Nunung
16	"Cuti (On Leave)"	March 28, 2015
As Andika is preparing for a leave of absence to Macau, he still has one job to do: transfer a report to the station's hard disk for preview by Baim Wong and the director. However, he instead take another hard disk in Gista's desk, costing him his vacation. In another story, Gista wants to tell a story by Putri but repeatedly breaks her promise as she is promptly called back into the office. Special guest: Baim Wong
17	"Style"	March 29, 2015
Director Lukman asks the crew to think about changing the presenter's wardrobe-as well as Dhewo's so they seek out to Lukman's daughter, Julie Estelle, for help. But there's just one problem: she speaks French, at least most of the time. Out from the office, Iren and Fajar are once again covering for a report but leaves their camera in the office, which risks Fajar his job. Special guest: Julie Estelle
18	"Live Report"	April 4, 2015
Iren is too eager for her first ever live report, which turns out to be a disaster as she slips and plunges into the river. Another disaster is initiated by Andika when he forgets to ask Jill Gladys to join the live report. In another story, Dhewo and Putri suddenly revives their old passion of the boyband Boyzone. Special guest: Jill Gladys
19	"Mawar (Rose)"	April 5, 2015
Gista is given a basket of roses from Director Lukman without giving him credit, which upsets Andika so much. Back then, the roses were mistakenly put in Mutia's desk by the office boy which also briefly upsets Dhewo. Outside the office for covering a report, Iren unleashes her martial art skills while boxing with Restu while Fajar's attempt at wall climbing makes him her laughing stock. Special guest: Restu Sinaga
20	"Kejutan (Surprise)"	April 11, 2015
The Entertainment News crew are to shoot a new program at Chef Aiko's restaurant, where coincidentally Dhewo is there for a date with Mutia. Chef Aiko decides to give them a surprise as asked by the crew, much to their surprise and anxiety. Special guest: Chef Aiko
21	"CLBK (Rekindle An Old Flame)"	April 12, 2015
The Entertainment News crew puts the blame on Andika for loss of their inventory, yet he asks Fajar to buy it. However, he instead uses the money to pay a DJ equipment for his former lover, DJ Yasmin, as he unwittingly misbehaves while meeting her. So Andika uses Iren to pay back Fajar's money by making up a story about the death of Fajar's pet cat. Special guest: DJ Yasmin
22	"Flu"	April 18, 2015
Andika's flu disturbs the office so much, he is asked to work in isolation. Meanwhile, Fajar's report of Gisella's healthy lifestyle turn out for the worse for him behind the camera, as he fails to follow her fitness duty despite voluntarily trying, such as her pilates routine and her organic all-vegetables meal. Special guest: Gisella Anastasia
23	"86"	April 19, 2015
Fajar was caught by police for not wearing proper safety gears while riding his motorbike to work. The same personnel went into his office for a meeting with the managers, frightening him. While Dhewo welcomed them, his hands were stuck in a handcuff after playing with it. At night, Fajar failed his report of a police chase for following the personnel way behind. Special guests: AKP Tosriadi Jamal, Brigadir Dara, Brigadir Eka
24	"Salon"	April 25, 2015
Sandra Dewi comes to the office asking for her product placement, a dog shampoo, on one of the E-News report. The crew takes Fajar with them to shoot a scene at a dog barber shop, but his phobia, even with small canines, disrupts his day. Meanwhile, Dhewo mistakenly uses Putri's dog shampoo on his bath before his golfing trip. Special guest: Sandra Dewi
25	"Saingan (Rival)"	April 26, 2015
Andika is approved for an on-leave but under one condition: he must tell nobody. Unfortunately, his talk with Fajar results in everyone asking him for gifts, making him leave with a heavy heart. To make matters worse, his replacement, Marcel, works better than him and manages to impress everyone. Special guest: Scott Leonard as Marcel
26	"Jabatan (Position)"	May 2, 2015
Gista gets a promotion as the senior producer, which humiliates Mutia for overlapping her job descriptions. Dhewo's daughter, Tiana, intends to give Mutia donuts at his request, but is mistakenly given to Gista. Shortly, Mutia is then promoted as the executive producer who is in charge of every single E-News crew member. Meanwhile, Fajar asks for money for an expensive watch which later he found is a counterfeit. Special guests: Putri Titian as Tiana
27	"Masa Lalu (Pasttime)"	May 3, 2015
Winky Wiryawan comes to the TV station for a live interview, making Mutia, his ex, anxious. They ultimately meet right after the show, but with his mic still on while talking with her, everyone knows their past affairs. Meanwhile, Iren wants to get tanned but when she asks Fajar to take her to a salon, he instead takes her roaming the streets under the sun for hours. Special guests: Winky Wiryawan
28	"Batu Akik (Gemstone)"	May 9, 2015
A viral topic about gemstones is stirring up within the E-News crew as Caesar, Dhewo and Ikin are wearing one on their finger while Mutia warns everyone not to discard it. An unfortunate incident results Dhewo putting on Ikin's, which is a fake one while the genuine one, now worn by Fajar is accidentally flushed down the toilet. In another story, Iren's report in a salsa dance course interests her so much, she lands a spot for an audition that night. Special guests: Nadia Vega
29	"Rules"	May 10, 2015
After a warning letter from regulators about inappropriate fashion emerges, Dhewo and Mutia are flustered as Pevita was wearing her minidress for a show, asking the producer for a retake. When the appropriate wardrobe is nowhere to be found, Mutia incidentally finds Putri's blouse, a gift for her mom, that is worn by Pevita. Putri is so mad she asks Fajar and Iren to bring it back that night, in which they actually did the next day. Special guests: Pevita Pearce
30	"Tamu (Visitor)"	May 16, 2015
Special guests: Dinda Kanya Dewi
31	"Miskol (Missed Call)"	May 17, 2015
32	"Piala (Trophy)"	May 23, 2015
Special guest: Julie Estelle
33	"Persiapan HUT NET. 2.0 (Preparation for NET. anniversary 2.0)"	May 24, 2015
Special guests: Wishnutama, Armand Maulana, Kunto Aji
34	"Host Baru (New Host)"	May 30, 2015
Special guests: Rio Dewanto
35	"Cuek (Indifference)"	June 6, 2015
It is Fajar's birthday but everyone seems to ignore him, so he turns to Ikin for counsel, to no success. His upset for his faulty uniform during an inspection affects his birthday surprise, turning his friends down as he angrily blows the candles.
36	"Artis Cilik (Young Artist)"	June 7, 2015
Special guests: Tasya Kamila, Tina Toon, Chiquita Meidy
37	"Diving"	June 13, 2015
Special guests: Prisia Nasution
38	"Pura-pura (Dissemble)"	June 14, 2015
39	"Kemalingan (Stolen)"	June 20, 2015
40	"Ondel-ondel"	June 21, 2015
Special guests: Vina A. Muliana
41	"Baper (Too Sensitive)"	June 27, 2015
Andika's interview with Isyana Sarasvati at a radio station goes into trouble when Fajar is unwittingly invited for a boastful interview with the host instead of Isyana. Back in the office, Dhewo goes mellow for missing Mutia as Hedi Yunus sings him a song after a sentimental chat. Special guest: Isyana Sarasvati & Hedi Yunus
42	"Tour"	June 28, 2015
43	"Kuda (Horse)"	July 4, 2015
Special guests: Atiqah Hasiholan
44	"Tiket Mudik (Homecoming Tickets)"	July 5, 2015
45	"Mirip (Alike)"	July 11, 2015
46	"Kesiangan (Oversleep)"	July 12, 2015
Special guests: Seto Mulyadi
47	"Lebaran 1 (Eid 1)"	July 18, 2015
Special guests: Armand Maulana, Dewi Gita
48	"Lebaran 2 (Eid 2)"	July 19, 2015
49	"Behind 86 1"	July 25, 2015
(Not to be confused with the "86" episode of this show). Gista has an idea of making a program about police patrol, catching criminals, and teaching the society of how to behave; and she is willing to put her career at risk for its success, despite objections from the whole staff of the station and her disadvantage of handling two programs at once.
50	"Behind 86 2"	July 26, 2015
In the continuation from the last episode, Gista and her crew asks for permission from the National Police Headquarters to obtain camera access on their daily job. The first episode of the program was a major success and Gista gained appraisal from those who once shun her. Special guests: Kombespol Istiono, Iptu Restu Indra P, Brigadir Herlina
51	"Resign"	August 1, 2015
52	"Cobaan (Temptation)"	August 2, 2015
Special guest: Sarah Sechan
53	"Hectic"	August 8, 2015
54	"Berantem (Combat)"	August 9, 2015
The two special guests went into war of words with each other during their live show, which prompts a few of the crew and the boss himself to calm the situation down. Special guest: Vincent Rompies & Desta Mahendra
55	"Tembakan (Shot)"	August 15, 2015
Special guest: Kirana Larasati
56	"Nasionalisme (Patriotism)"	August 16, 2015
Special guest: Jay Subiyakto
57	"Nyaris (Close Enough)"	August 22, 2015
58	"Pressure"	August 23, 2015
When the audience rating of Entertainment News is going downhill, Gista who is in charge of the show at that moment commands the whole crew to do their job well to boost the rating, much to the displeasure of Putri who asks Andika and Iren to join her in ignoring Gista for being "bossy". Both recovered their relationship after Gista vents her pressure.
59	"Nginap (Staying in)"	August 29, 2015
Andika, Putri, and Iren are asked to handle the production of E-News and another program which air the next morning, which forced them to stay in the office for the night. Unfortunately, they are still not allowed to drown in sleepiness because of the afternoon broadcast.
60	"Produser (Producer)"	August 30, 2015
The whole crew are undergoing a workshop on basic broadcasting due to Andika's subpar knowledge. At the same time however, a live broadcast of E-News forces Gista to ask producers from other programs to jump in and help. The live went successful but they are then told to undergo assessment on financing in 3 days.
61	"Pengganti (Replacement)"	September 5, 2015
The team's failed interview with Budi Doremi angers Dhewo and Andika to the point that Fajar is replaced with another cameraman named Joseph for his bad attitude, but a special request to report about extreme sports prompts his callback. Special guest: Budi Doremi as himself & Samuel Rizal as Jose.
62	"Kabur (Running Away)"	September 6, 2015
In the continuation of the last episode, Andika and Iren are going on a field report about Prisia's paragliding experience with Fajar as their cameraman. The attempt is delayed to the next day, forcing them to sleep on location, but Fajar, who does not have the courage to shoot the attempt by gliding himself, runs away from the hotel that night. Special guest: Prisia Nasution
63	"Terjun (Diving)"	September 12, 2015
Andika and Iren finally found Fajar who was waiting for a ride to escape from his paragliding report. Fajar eventually does it in spite of his fears, but his failure of shooting the dive prompts him to do it again. Special guest: Prisia Nasution
64	"Katanya (Allegedly)"	September 13, 2015
The crew's report at Nirina Zubir's new steak restaurant turns out for the worse for Andika, who eventually upsets his stomach. Meanwhile Caesar's use of the word "allegedly" multiple times during the broadcast makes the Director himself confront every single crew member. Special guest: Nirina Zubir
65	"Magang (Internship)"	September 19, 2015
Interns Bebi & Jo are assisted by Andika during their time working for Entertainment News. Jo resigns after a struggle on the way to the next day's field report while Bebi's contribution for editing a footage for broadcast impresses the crew. While Andika was given credit, his feeling goes topsy turvy after hearing that Gista, whom he admires, will be on-leave to get married. Featuring: Laura Theux & Boby Tarigan as interns Bebi & Jo.
66	"Sabar (Cheer Up)"	September 20, 2015
Andika shows up in the office in disappointment after Gista's marriage, but his coworkers' advice to "cheer up" upsets him even more. Meanwhile, Iren is inadvertently set up for a date with Joseph the cameraman by Putri, which goes successfully. Special guest: Samuel Rizal as Joseph. Note: At the time of the episode's airing, Gista was just married to the CEO of NET. Wishnutama, thus the opening scene was shot outside their reception venue.
67	"Moge (Chopper)"	September 26, 2015
The crew are to report about Tora Sudiro's activity with his chopper, just a few hours from broadcast. Andika and Fajar decides to get there with Fajar's motorbike, but delaying themselves en route. At the end of the day, the report is requested at the last minute not to be aired on that same day, while Fajar is left alone with his motorbike failing to start. Special guest: Tora Sudiro
68	"Sebel (Pissed Off)"	September 27, 2015
Iren, who usually briefs the presenters for the show's contents, gets anxious and pissed while briefing for the day's presenter, but is then resolved with the help of Putri. Meanwhile, Andika is ecstatic for finding out Gista liked his photo on Instagram, but finds out that his workmates get more photos that are liked by her than his own.
69	"Telat (Late)"	October 3, 2015
Caesar arrived minutes before broadcast, only to find out that someone else has already taken over his position there and for the long term, yet fails his own commitment to host the following morning. Meanwhile, Dhewo's glasses are broken by Mutia and uses this opportunity to turn her on, while Bebi, the new intern, indirectly expresses her interest for Andika. Featuring: Laura Theux as Bebi.
70	"Ketinggalan (Left Behind)"	October 4, 2015
Andika left his ID card that is used to access the rooms in the office, so he asks Fajar to take it from his house, ending up being punished when the ID cannot be found. Meanwhile. Kezia Karamoy is interviewed by the crew about her relationship which goes successful for clarifying about what is really happening through one of the movies she watched and it inspires Iren to get along with Joseph. Special guest: Kezia Karamoy, featuring Samuel Rizal as Jose
71	"Stress"	October 10, 2015
The producers, director and head of department are flustered for the reduction in the show's share and rating, taking the whole crew with them into distress as they are busy surveying and analyzing. Fortunately, the director himself meets the crew to convince that there is no need to be stressed out for that very reason. In other stories, Dhewo switches glasses on occasion when he meets either Mutia or Director Lukman, while Andika unwittingly vents his feelings to Bebi, yet she listens and consoles him. Featuring: Laura Theux as Bebi.
72	"KI 1"	October 11, 2015
The crew are working on a concept for a new sitcom where international students sit in a class together (what is now one of NET.'s TV show, Kelas Internasional). One of the talents, a Japanese comes to the station struggling with a language barrier. Andika is asked to sketch a set for the show, but scrambles throughout the office when his job, which is due that night, is still unfinished. Special guest: Suzuki Featuring: Samuel Rizal as Jose.
73	"Kelas Internasional 2"	October 17, 2015
In the continuation of the last episode, Andika accidentally deletes the rendition of the set for the new TV show, which is scheduled to be presented to Director Lukman that night. While that problem was eventually resolved, another crew member named Arie is asked to produce a script, but was met with dissatisfaction from Putri. The cast of the show meets together the following day to introduce themselves and to prepare for shooting the next day, but multiple problems are still present, from script to the cast's permit. Special guests: Suzuki, Wiwiek, Abbas Aminu, Arie Kriting Featuring: Laura Theux as Bebi.
74	"Kelas Internasional 3"	October 18, 2015
In the continuation of the last episode, Putri is exhausted after working and reworking the show's script for days, thus is barred from watching the next's day recording in the studio with Andika as the person in-charge. She feels dissatisfaction during the editing process, telling her superiors that there is something missing that she seems unable to find, to be convinced by them that the show is good for premiere on the week. Meanwhile, Fajar tries to flirt with Bebi but she turns him down on all his attempts. Special guests: Suzuki, Abbas Aminu, Tarra Budiman Featuring: Laura Theux as Bebi.
75	"Off Road"	October 24, 2015
Andika, Iren and Fajar are sent to interview Alinka Hardianti's off road driving activity, but as Fajar fails to bring the GoPro camera mount, they are conflicting about the alternatives, from asking Fajar to shoot from inside the vehicle himself to making a webbing that can mount the camera; the latter of which is Fajar's idea that was initially distrusted by his fellow crew. Special guests: Alinka Hardianti Featuring: Laura Theux as Bebi.
76	"Real Live"	October 25, 2015
The crew's live report with Melly Goeslaw goes wrong behind the scenes while Andika is the person in charge, but he himself is blamed for being bossy. Fajar, who is also on the job, tries to sing to impress Melly but does that while disturbing everyone else and sings miserably in front of her. Meanwhile Dhewo asks Iren about a concept for a new show but Iren's preference turns him down.Special guests: Anto Hoed & Melly Goeslaw Featuring: Samuel Rizal as Jose, Laura Theux as Bebi.
77	"Bayar Utang (Paying Debt)"	October 31, 2015
Fajar is mobbed by multiple people who asks him to pay his debt in addition to his rent that is overdue, so he tries to find a way such as by tricking his colleague to buy the company attire from him by deliberately inflating their price. His act is then foiled by them and results in eviction from his house. Featuring: Laura Theux as Bebi.
78	"Diusir (Evicted)"	November 1, 2015
As Andika knows about Fajar's eviction, he invites him to stay at his room, yet his behavior frustrates Andika and Bebi, who is joining the following night. Despite repeated attempts by Andika to remove him night by night, he is somehow managed to stay. Featuring: Laura Theux as Bebi.
79	"Remix"	November 7, 2015
Iren is asked by Dhewo to make a footage about the TV station's newest talent show, The Remix but under one condition: it shall not contain any footage of Winky, Mutia's ex-lover. Iren takes Andika and Fajar on location, but Fajar's unusual indifference flusters his teammates. Mutia also goes there with her boss and coincidentally meets Winky, resulting in an awkward drama between the two back in the office the following day. Featuring: Laura Theux as Bebi, Special guest: Winky Wiryawan
80	"Brainstorming"	November 14, 2015
The director is asking Dhewo to brainstorm an idea for a new show, so Mutia sets up a hotel for everyone to join in the think tank for the weekend. Dhewo wants to use this opportunity to pursue a relationship with Mutia, however she dropped out for the night because of her workload, while Andika is messing up the first day of the meeting. Featuring: Laura Theux as Bebi.
81	"Brainstorming part 2"	November 15, 2015
Dhewo arrives at the venue at night just as the brainstorming session is done, and he unwittingly brings Fajar who fell asleep in his car. Iren, Putri, and Gista presents each of their ideas the next day, which is the same as every single idea that Andika has. As Andika is being sentimental, Gista, who knows this problem, cheers him by convincing him that he is the most creative of them all, even better than his superior. Meanwhile, Dhewo himself is caught into trouble by the director for asking their staff to interview a few of Cherrybelle's personnel while the crew are on vacation. Special guests: Novi, Angel, and Christi of Cherrybelle
82	"Persaingan (Competition)"	November 21, 2015
Gista temporarily hands over the production of Entertainment News to Putri, instead of Andika as usual. This dissatisfies him and he is trying every single way to gain Gista's trust to him back, but messes up in its progress. In another story, a new office boy becomes a favorite but is reprimanded to another site for initiatively tidying up the crew's paper at their table, a wrong thing to do that upsets the crew.
83	"Fashion"	November 22, 2015
Andika, Iren, and Fajar are on assignment to Sophia's residence but is haunted by their past mistakes. As they are there, Iren breaks Sophia's high-heeled shoes and gives a wrong address to Barli, while Sophia's pet dog scares Fajar. Meanwhile Bebi, who is coming as a visitor, is jealous at Andika for being in favor of Eva Celia. Special guest: Sophia Latjuba & Barli Asmara. Featuring: Laura Theux as Bebi.
84	"Ngaku (Confess)"	November 28, 2015
Andika and Fajar are accused of stealing a bicycle from the company bike club in the parking lot, and the action is all caught on camera. The plot flashes back to the story when Andika is asked to grab a bike as a property for a show, with permission from the club as asked by Gista. Later, when it is known that the permit was not from the actual owner of the bike, the matter is handed over to the HRD, but all of this is actually a prank set up by a crew member.
85	"Move On"	November 29, 2015
Andika tells Fajar that he is ready to move on from his ambition of loving Gista, so he looks to Bebi, who has liked him since day one of internship. Meanwhile, Fajar lends his camera lens to Andika, something he is trying to sell to pay his debt. Unfortunately, the lens breaks off as Andika is playing it with Bebi but it ultimately makes Fajar clear from his debt. Featuring: Laura Theux as Bebi.
86	"Nyonya Nunung (Madam Nunung)"	December 5, 2015
A new program called Nyonya Nunung is coming up on the crew's to-do list. While Gista is brainstorming to craft its concept, Bebi comes as a guest to bring a photo collage of herself with the crew, giving her an inspiration. Meanwhile, Dhewo uses his opportunity of being 'under the weather' to attract Mutia, saying that he "wants attention". Featuring: Laura Theux as Bebi.
87	"Nyonya Nunung Part 2 (Madam Nunung)"	December 6, 2015
On the premiere day, it is up to the crew to make sure every single thing goes right on the air. Mutia asks to invite Cowboy Junior as the guest star; Gista, the real person in charge, is against it but she is just told about the change minutes before on air. Iren mistakenly calls another artist with a similar name but is praised by Gista. Featuring: Laura Theux as Bebi. Special guests: Nunung, Koboi, Tora Sudiro, Setyawan.
88	"Tegar (Staying strong)"	December 12, 2015
Farhan comes to pitch in for sponsorship of his football team, but his constant flirtation to Mutia makes Dhewo insecure. Meanwhile, Andika is trying to avoid Bebi all day, as she tries to tell him about the end of her internship. Featuring: Laura Theux as Bebi. Special guests: Farhan
89	"Tanya (To ask)"	December 13, 2015
Iren is asked to submit a form to someone she never met before, something that is usually done by Andika, but gets lost along the way and gets terrified as she witness the person she is looking for rips a sheet of a similar form. In another story, she is torn by the fact that Jose, whom she is in love with, already has a girlfriend. Meanwhile, Dhewo and Caesar are asked about their knowledge of football, amidst the football cup held by the TV station, but they embarrassingly failed in front of their superior. Featuring: Samuel Rizal as Jose.
