= SPTV =

SPTV may refer to:

- Space Power TV
- Sony Pictures Television
- SPTV, a Brazilian news program aired by TV Globo in São Paulo
