= Sutrisno =

Sutrisno or Sutrisna is an Indonesian surname. Notable people with the surname include:

- Ade Sutrisna (1974–2016), Indonesian badminton player
- Bambang Sutrisno (born 1941), Indonesian embezzlement fugitive
- Try Sutrisno (1935–2026), Indonesian vice president from 1993 to 1998
