= Dancing in the Rain =

Dancing in the Rain may refer to:

== Film and TV ==
- Dancing in the Rain (1961 film) (Ples v dežju), a Slovene film directed by Boštjan Hladnik
- "Dancing in the Rain", an episode of Step It Up and Dance
- Dancing in the Rain, a 1986 BBC documentary about ballroom dancing by Jenny Barraclough
- Dancing in the Rain (2018 film), an Indonesian film

== Albums ==
- Dancing in the Rain, 1986 album by Frankie Miller
- Dancing in the Rain, 2006 album by San Miguel Master Chorale
- Dance in the Rain (album), 2014 album by Ricki-Lee Coulter

== Songs ==
- "Dancing in the Rain" (song), a song by Spanish singer Ruth Lorenzo chosen to represent Spain at the Eurovision Song Contest 2014.
- "Dancing in the Rain", a song by Robi Draco Rosa from Mad Love
- "Dancing in the Rain", a number from the musical Curley McDimple
- "Dance in the Rain" (song), a 2014 song by Koda Kumi
- "Dance in the Rain", a song by Megadeth from Super Collider

== See also ==
- Singin' in the Rain, a 1952 American musical romantic comedy film
