= Amal Saad Eddin =

Syrian television actress

- آمال سعد الدين
- Born: Latakia, Syria
- Occupation: Voice acting
- Years active: 1994–present
- Spouse: Qasim Melho

Amal Saad Eddin (Arabic: آمال سعد الدين) is a Palestinian Syrian actress and director.

== Early life ==
Saad Eddin was born in Latakia to a Palestinian family. She is married to the artist Qasim Melho. She worked as a broadcaster in the role of Conan in the television program Conan on the Air.

== Appearances ==
=== TV series ===
- Fire shaft
- Champion of this decade
- The hotel
- episodes of spot light series

=== Broadcasting ===
- The rule of justice

=== Movies ===
- Spirit breeze
- The Jasmine Birds (credited as Amal Saad Al-Deen)

=== Dubbing roles ===
- Detective Conan – Conan Edogawa
  - Detective Conan: The Time-Bombed Skyscraper – Conan Edogawa
  - Detective Conan: The Fourteenth Target – Conan Edogawa
  - Detective Conan: The Last Wizard of the Century – Conan Edogawa
  - Detective Conan: Captured in Her Eyes – Conan Edogawa
  - Detective Conan: Zero the Enforcer – Conan Edogawa
  - Detective Conan: The Fist of Blue Sapphire – Conan Edogawa
- Bomberman B-Daman Bakugaiden
- The Sylvester & Tweety Mysteries – Granny (Venus Centre version)
- Pokémon – Nurse Joy, Gary Oak, Sabrina, Todd Snap, minor characters
- Fist of the North Star
- Ranma ½ – Reem (Akane Tendo)
- Muka Muka Paradise
- Doraemon (1979 anime) – Doraemon
- One Piece – Nojiko, Kuina
- Pippi Longstocking – Pippi Longstocking
- Bakugan Battle Brawlers – Nene
- Midori no Makibaō – Midori Makibaō (Venus Centre version)
- Adventures of Sonic the Hedgehog – Qanfooz (Sonic the Hedgehog) (Venus Centre version)
- Pretty Rhythm - Itsuki Harune
