= Adnan Alaoda =

Syrian script writer

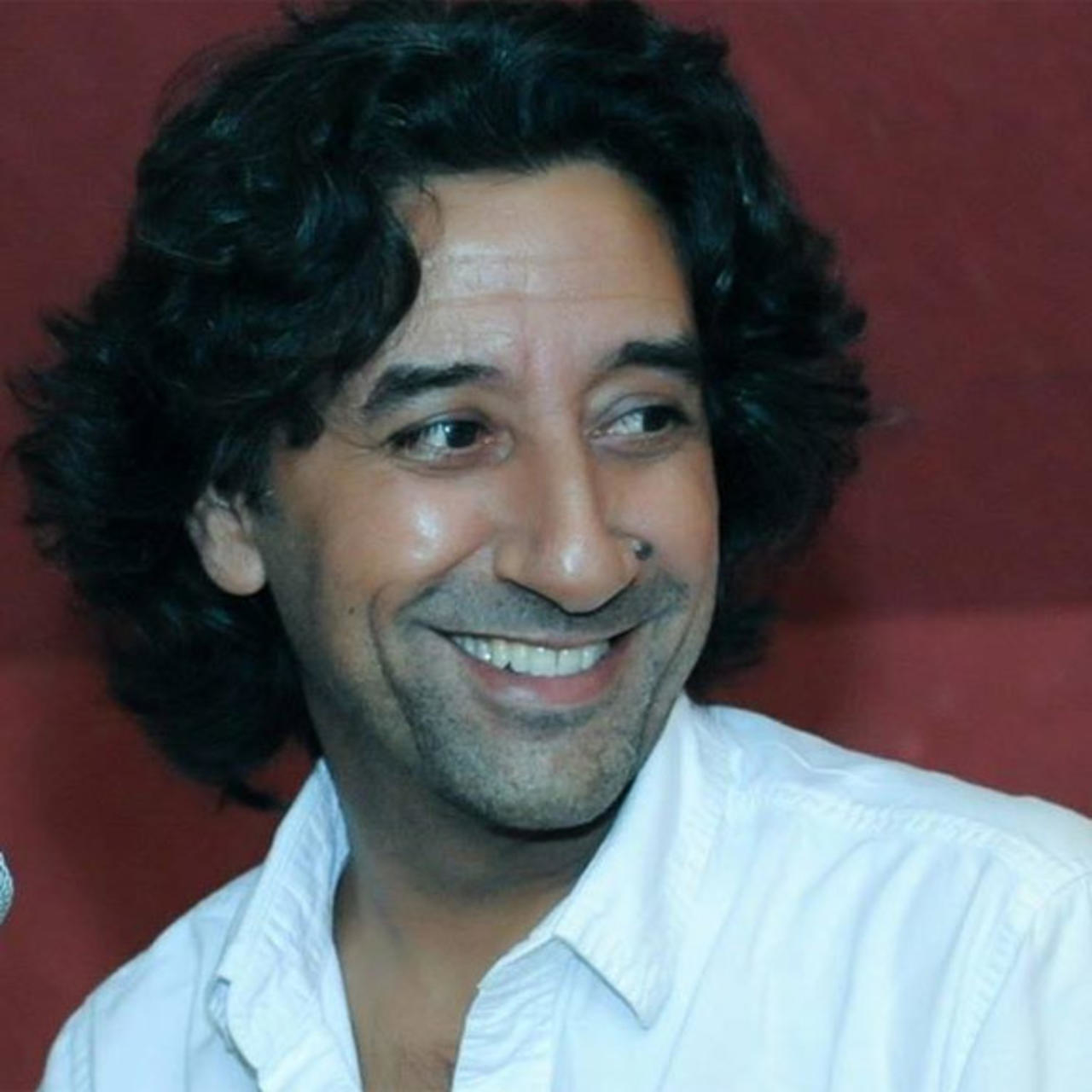
- Born: 1975 (age 50–51); Raqqa, Syria
- Education: University of Damascus
- Occupations: Writer, poet, journalist
- Years active: 2002–present

Adnan Alaoda (Arabic: عدنان العودة) is a Syrian scriptwriter, journalist, and poet who was born in Syria, 1975. He wrote five scripts for popular TV series including "Blood Cup", three plays in colloquial Arabic, and two collections of poetry. In 2015, his play "Lost Horses" won the Sultan Al-Qasimi award for Best Arabic Play in the Festival of Arabic Theatre in Rabat, Morocco.

== Education and career ==
Alaoda was born in 1975 in Raqqa, Syria. He moved to Damascus in 1993 to continue his studies. He attained a bachelor's degree in journalism from the University of Damascus and in 2000 he obtained his second bachelor's degree in Theatre Criticism and Literature from the same university. In 2005, Alaoda worked as a screenwriter for Channel Al-Jazeera Children in Qatar. Then, he worked as a consultant for Mamdouh Adwan Publishing House in Damascus, Syria in 2006. After a few years, he was the presenter and producer of "Book World" which is a program that was featured on Sky News Arabic. In 2013, Alaoda moved to Dubai because of the war in Syria. He worked in Dubai as the Event Manager at Al Rewaq Cultural and Artistic Event. Now, Alaoda Lives in Rotterdam, the Netherlands. He wrote the scripts for many popular TV series including "Blood Cup", "Doors for the Clouds", "What Happened in Damascus" and "Yarning-Tawq". He published three plays in colloquial Arabic one of which was "Lost Horses" which won in 2015 the Sultan Al-Qasimi award for Best Arabic Play in The Festival of Arabic Theatre in Rabat, Morocco. Alaoda also published two poetry collections including "The Drunkenness of the Mad". He wrote the script for the documentary film "Women’s Talk" and many famous bands and singers sung his lyrics including Macadi Nahass, Lena Chamamaan, and Rasha Rizk.

== Publications ==
=== Scripts ===
- Blood Cup (Original title: Finjan al Dam)
- Doors of the Clouds (Original title: Abwab Al-Ghaim)
- Yarning-Tawq
- What Happened in Damascus (Original title: Matha Hadatha fi Dimashq)
- Women's Talk (Original title: Kalam Hareem)

=== Plays ===
- Al Murood W Al Makhala
- Lost Horses (Original title: Khail Tayha)
- Raisin (Original title: Zabib)

=== Poetry collections ===
- The Drunkenness of the Mad (Original title: Sukran Al-Majaneen)
- Al El Houri
