= Tarek Alarabi Tourgane =

Algerian-Syrian composer (born 1959)

- Born: 22 August 1959 (age 66); Damascus, Syria
- Years active: 1990–present
- Children: 3

Tarek Alarabi Tourgane (Arabic: طارق العربي طرقان; 22 August, 1959) is an Algerian composer and singer born and raised in Damascus, Syria. He is best known for composing the theme songs for animated series in the Arab world.

He worked for the Spacetoon channel and the Syrian cartoon dubbing company, Venus Centre, and composed most of the songs for the cartoon and anime programs shown on the channel, and participated in singing many of them.

== Career ==
At the beginning of the 1990s, Tarek joined the Venus Centre, and his first work was the song of the anime series The Jungle Book.

He has over 1500 songs written, composed and sung by him, which have an impact on many generations. He also presented many successful concerts and participated in many festivals and events.

He is the author of the famous nashid Qamarun.

== Personal life ==
Tarek was born in Damascus, Syria, to Algerian parents.

He is married and has two daughters and one son: Dema, Tala, and Mohammed. All of whom sing along with him. Despite him and his children being born and raised in Syria, none of them possess the Syrian citizenship, and instead use Algerian passports.
