= Deva Mahenra =

Indonesian actor

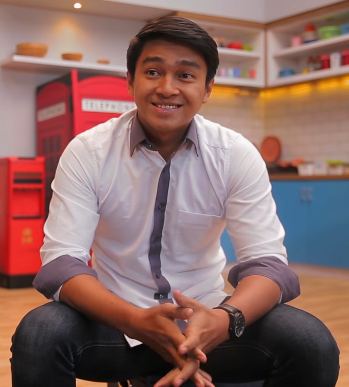
- Mahenra in 2016
- Born: Ujung Pandang, Indonesia
- Occupations: Actor Model; Presenter; DJ; Singer
- Years active: 2007–present

Deva Mahenra is an actor, model and presenter from Indonesia.

== Filmography ==
=== Films ===
Yeat	Title	Role	Notes	Ref.
2013	Slank Nggak Ada Matinya	Abdee Negara		
2014	Crush	Andre		
2014	Aku, Kau & KUA	Deon		
2015	Guru Bangsa: Tjokroaminoto	Soekarno		
2015	Romeo + Rinjani	Romeo		
2016	Sabtu Bersama Bapak	Cakra		
2016	Bangkit!	Arifin		
2016	Cinta Laki-laki Biasa	Muhammad Rafli Imani		
2017	Jomblo Reboot	Olip		
2017	Keluarga Tak Kasat Mata	Genta		
2017	Satu Hari Nanti	Bima		
2018	Partikelir	Jaka Nugraha		
2018	Belok Kanan Barcelona	Yusuf "Ucup" Hasanuddin		
2018	Dancing in the Rain	Radin		
2019	Ghost Writer	Vino		
2019	99 Nama Cinta	Kiblat		
2021	Serigala Langit	Gadhing "Panther" Baskara	Release MAXstream	
2022	Ghost Writer 2	Vino		
TBA	Until Tomorrow	Haka		

=== Web-series ===
Year	Title	Role	Channel	Notes	Ref.
2019	Cerita Dokter Cinta	Dr. Rian	Maxstream		
2019	Kisah Tanah Jawa: Merapi	Andi	WeTV & iflix		
2022	Dating Queen	Bambang	Vidio		
2023	Blood Curse	Esa Prasetyo	Disney+ Hotstar		

=== Television ===
Year	Title	Role	Notes
2012	Saranghae I Love You		
2012	Pembantu dan Tukang Ojek	Riko	
2014	Sesegar Cinta Tukang Jus Buah		Television film
2014	Jodoh Gue Si Cipluk		Television film
2015–2016	The Remix	Host	
2014–2017	Tetangga Masa Gitu?	Bastian Irawan	
2018	Entertainment News	Host	
2022	Ikatan Cinta	Sal Pradipta	

=== Music video ===
- Mike Mohede - "Mampu Tanpanya"
- Latasha - "Falling in Love"
- Queen Jack - "That's Enough"
- Maudy Ayunda - "Bayangkan Rasakan"
- Melly Goeslaw - "Bintang di Hati"
- Enzy Storia - "Setengah Hati"
- Raisa - "Ragu"

== Advertisement ==
- Indomie versi Ramadhan
