= Arief Yahya =

Indonesian politician

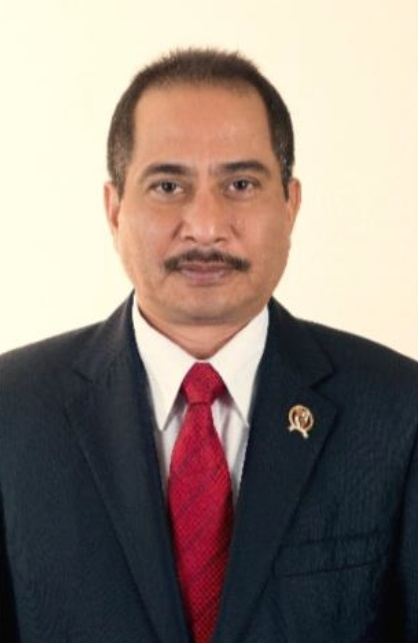
- Arief Yahya as Minister of Tourism (2016)

9th Minister of Tourism
- In office 27 October 2014 – 23 October 2019
- President: Joko Widodo
- Preceded by: Mari Elka Pangestu
- Succeeded by: Wishnutama

Personal details
- Born: 2 April 1961 (age 65) Banyuwangi, East Java
- Party: Non Party
- Relations: Said Suhadi (Father); Siti Badriya (Mother)
- Children: 4
- Education: Bandung Institute of Technology; University of Surrey; Padjadjaran University
- Profession: Professional

Arief Yahya (born 2 April 1961 in Banyuwangi) is the former Minister of Tourism of Indonesia between 2014 and 2019 in the Working Cabinet of President Joko Widodo. Prior to becoming a minister, he had been the CEO at state-owned Telkom Indonesia between 2012 and his appointment.

== Background ==
Yahya was born in Banyuwangi, East Java on 2 March 1961, his father a merchant while her mother was a stay-at-home parent. At the age of 18, he was admitted to the Bandung Institute of Technology to study electrical engineering. Later, he would receive a scholarship from his workplace to study at Surrey University. He continued to earn his doctorate at Padjadjaran University, graduating with a business management degree in 2014.

== Career ==
=== Telkom ===
He started working at Telkom Indonesia in 1986. There, he gradually rose up the corporate ranks, at points becoming head of a local office, a regional division, then becoming a director of enterprise and wholesale.

In 2012, he was appointed by the government as CEO, replacing Rinaldi Firmansyah.

=== Minister of Tourism ===
He was appointed minister of tourism by newly elected Joko Widodo in 2014. In 2015, his ministry set a target to have 20 million foreign visitors by 2019, with visits that year numbering around 9 million per year. By 2017, the number had increased to 14 million.
