= Space Power TV =

Arabian TV channel

Space Power
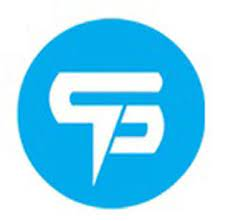
- Logo used since October 2017
- Country: United Arab Emirates, Syria
- Broadcast area: Arab world
- Headquarters: Damascus, Syria; Dubai, UAE

Programming
- Languages: Arabic; English; Japanese
- Picture format: 576i (4:3 - 16:9 SDTV)

Ownership
- Owner: Spacetoon International
- Sister channels: Spacetoon; Spacetoon English; Spacetoon Korea

History
- Launched: 8 March 2008; 18 years ago 16 November 2016; 9 years ago (as a block)
- Closed: 28 April 2014; 12 years ago

Links
- Website: www.spacepower.tv

Space Power (SPTV; Arabic: سبيس باور or سبيسباور) was a television channel for teens and adults in the Arab world. It remains active as a programming block, featuring anime aimed at audiences aged 13 to 19.

== History ==
Based in Damascus, Syria, the channel began experimental broadcasting on 8 March 2008 and officially launched on 31 October with content based by Spacetoon in UAE and from the Venus Center company in Syria. On 14 May 2011, it was renamed to SPTV, before shutting down in April 2014.

On 16 November 2016, Space Power returned as a programming block in the Spacetoon channel, starting from 10:30 pm Mecca time until midnight and displaying all the dubbing works in its favor with the exchange of logos between Space Power and Spacetoon every ten seconds.

In 2019, some of the Space Power programs were added to the Spacetoon Go app. That same year, a new program called Magic Kaito was added to the Space Power menu on the Spacetoon Go app, making it the first program for Space Power after closing the channel. The channel's website, www.spacepower.tv, was active from 1 November 2007 to 5 March 2017.

== Blocks ==
On 31 October 2008, SPTV had 6 categories.

- Manga (Arabic: مانغا) in color orange 2008-onwards.
- Drama (Arabic: دراما) in color yellow 2008-onwards.
- Movies (Arabic: أفلام) in color red 2008-onwards.
- Entertainment (Arabic: ترفيه) in purple on 31 October 2008 to 2009 and 2009-onwards is pink.
- Science & Tech (Arabic: علوم) in blue on 31 October 2008 to 2009 and 2009-onwards is purple.
- Sports (Arabic: رياضة) color is green 2008-onwards.

== See also ==
- Spacetoon
- Spacetoon English
