= Crush (2014 film) =

- Film poster
- Directed by: Rizal Mantovani
- Produced by: Irving Artemas
- Starring: Cherrybelle; Anisa Rahma; Yuanita Christiani; Deva Mahenra; Erin Shay; Indrodjojo Kusumonegoro
- Music by: Aghi Narottama; Bembi Gusti
- Distributed by: Brainstorminc
- Release date: 10 April 2014
- Running time: 103 minutes
- Countries: Indonesia; Australia
- Languages: Indonesian; English

Crush is a 2014 Indonesian drama and musical film directed by Rizal Mantovani. Its cast includes Cherrybelle, Deva Mahenra, Yuanita Christiani, Indrodjojo Kusumonegoro, Farhan, and Erin Shay. It had a budget of Rp. 15 billion (about $1 million US dollars).

== Plot ==
The film follows the girlband Cherrybelle which consists of Cherly (Cherly Yuliana Anggraini), Angel (Margareth Angelina), Christy (Christy Saura Noela Uni), Gigi (Brigitta Cynthia), Ryn (Jessyca Stefani Auryn), Steffy (Stefanny Margaretha Aay), Felly (Yefani Filliang), Kezia (Kezia Karamoy), and Anisa (Anisa Rahma). A producer (Farhan) requests that the band create a new innovative dance. Anisa resigns from Cherrybelle to continue her studies.

The band's management brings in a new coach, Andre (Deva Mahenra), who is known as a reliable senior dancer in Jakarta. Andre' charismatic presence makes Cherrybelle's members uncomfortable, especially Kezia. When Andre finds a love letter from a secret fan, he becomes angry and disappointed, and decides to quit his position with the band. Cherly, as leader of Cherrybelle, feels guilty and begins a search for Andre. She believes that he had gone to the town of Glenmore in Australia, near Melbourne.

Meanwhile, Angel's sister, Karen (Yuanita Christiani), who lives in Melbourne, insults Angel's association with Cherrybelle.

Cherrybelle travel to Melbourne. They search for Andre intending to ask him to return as their coach. Cherrybelle face off against Karen and her dance group, but are embarrassed by their performance. They do not find Andre in Australia and they return to Jakarta. They learn that Andre went to Glenmore in Indonesia, which is a sub-district in Banyuwangi.

== Cast ==
- Margareth Angelina as Angel
- Cherly Yuliana Anggraini as Cherly
- Christy Saura Noela Unu as Christy
- Kezia Karamoy as Kezia
- Brigitta Cynthia as Gigi
- Jessica Stefani Auryn as Ryn
- Stefanny Margaretha Aay as Steffy
- Yefani Filliang as Felly
- Anisa Rahma as Anisa
- Deva Mahenra as Andre
- Yuanita Christiani as Karen
- Farhan as Cherrybelle's manager
- Indrodjojo Kusumonegoro as Andre' grandfather
- Sam Brodie as the director
- Irving Artemas as Reza
- Erin Shay as Rima
- Mikhaela Jade as Stacey
- Endang Nastiti as Julie
- Teguh Sanjaya as Agung

== Filming process ==
According to the director, Rizal Mantovani, Crush was filmed in Jakarta, Indonesia and Melbourne, Australia. During the course of filming process, Rizal admitted encountered some obstacles. But these obstacles successfully completed well as supported by the crew and players have high professionalism. And Rizal said "There [Australia] due to the limited time and the weather was not erratic, so when shooting bright, suddenly dark, was afraid the color is mottled but all can be overcome."

== Soundtrack ==
This film's soundtrack includes the song "Dunia Tersenyum", performed by Cherrybelle.
