= Vina Muliana =

Indonesian content creator

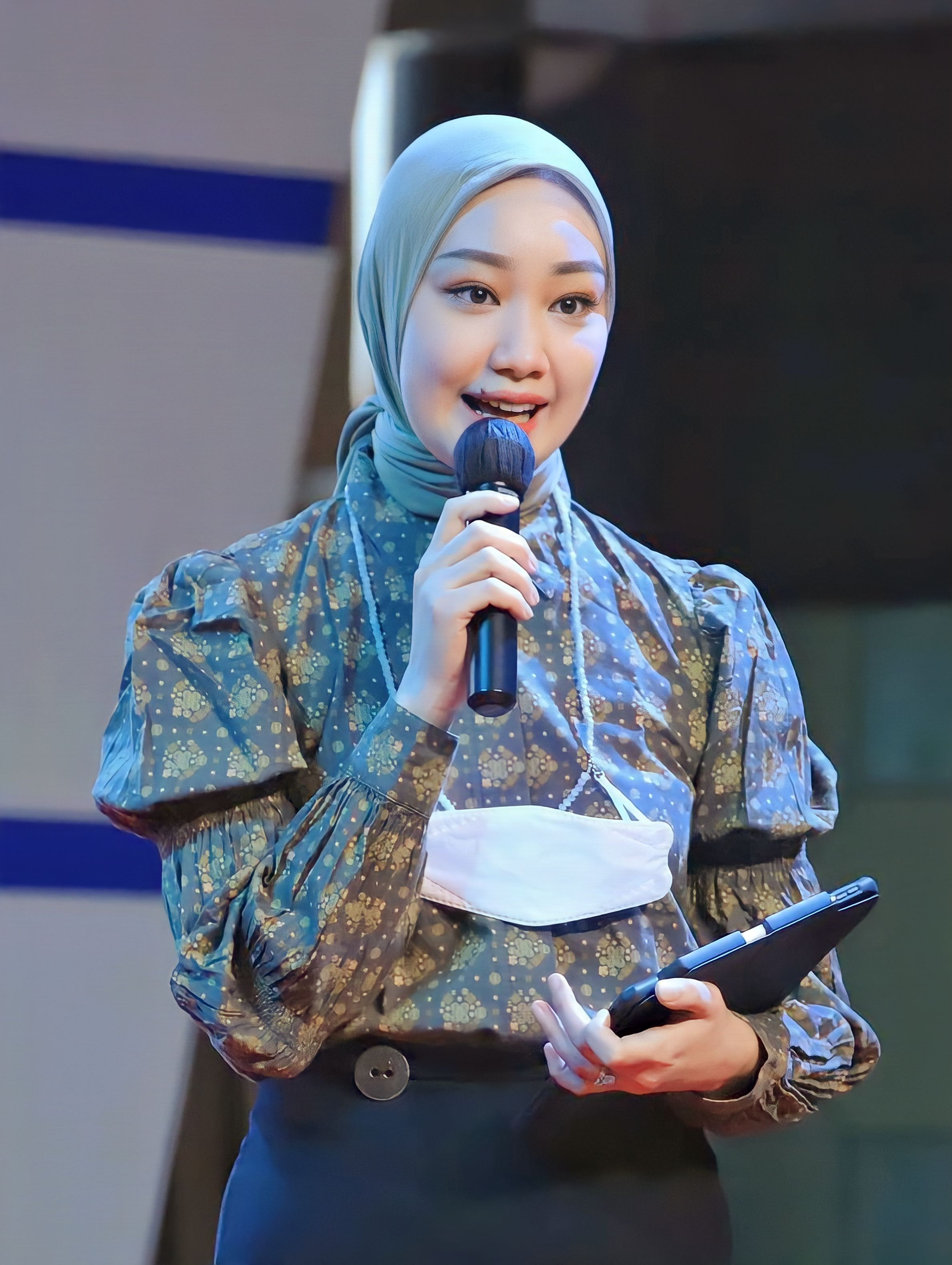
- Muliana in 2022
- Born: Vina Andhiani Muliana; 19 January 1994 (age 32)
- Education: Universitas Padjadjaran; London School of Public Relations
- Occupations: State-owned enterprise employee; Content creator
- Years active: 2014—now
- Height: 177 cm (5 ft 10 in)

Vina Andhiani Muliana (born 19 January 1994) is an Indonesian content creator and employee of a state-owned enterprise. Muliana, who was the winner of Abang None Jakarta in 2014, pursues her professional career as an employee at Mining Industry Indonesia while pursuing a career as a content creator on TikTok since 2021 with content discussing career and employment issues. She is an awardee of the TikTok Indonesia Awards 2021 in the “Best of Learning & Education” category.

== Life ==
Vina Andhiani Muliana was born on 19 January 1994. She is the eldest of two children, from the couple Mulyadiana and Noerlaila Andhayani. She has a younger sister named Karina Muliana. Vina has Betawi ancestry from her mother and Sundanese ancestry from her father.

Muliana decided to wear hijab in 2007. It began with her commitment that if she could go to school in Jakarta, she would wear the hijab. Previously she always followed her father to move from job to job, so she got bored and decided to go to school in Jakarta. When she made the vow, she felt that wearing hijab could be safer. Since she had never lived in Jakarta for long periods of time, she sees Jakarta as a metropolitan city so she needs to fortify herself and chooses to wear hijab.

Muliana married Mohamad Fidelio Omar Bestari who works as a financial planner on 5 October 2019.

== Career ==
Muliana started her career as a model. It started in 2011 when she was studying in Bandung, where at that time the hijab trend was popular. Muliana was offered to become a model when she was watching a fashion show and met designer Ghaida Tsurayya, the daughter of AA Gym. She noticed that Muliana had a tall body and offered her to be a model for her collection. Ever since then, she pursued modeling by becoming a freelance model in Bandung while studying. Then her network expanded when she met an agency in Jakarta. Muliana said that she made modeling a side job. According to her, models who wear hijab cannot consistently get jobs like non-hijab models. Although modelling has a large market in Indonesia, it is bigger for models who do not wear hijab.

In 2014, Muliana participated in the Jakarta tourism ambassador contest, Abang None, which has been held since 1968. She admitted that she was interested in joining the event because she saw the Abang None election program on television and had been preparing since 2011. After becoming the winner of None at the South Jakarta level in 2014, she then advanced to the provincial level. On the grand finale night held at Plaza Monas East Side, Central Jakarta on 30 August 2014, Muliana managed to win pairing with Zulfikri Arif from Thousand Islands by defeating 18 other finalists. Muliana received a prize worth Rp. 100 million in deposit. Her victory in the contest made history as she was the first None to wear a hijab.

During her tenure as None, she was tasked with accompanying the Governor and Mayor and attending government programs in the cultural sector. In September 2014, he accompanied the Governor of Jakarta to sign the contract for Jakarta to host the 18th Asian Games. Furthermore, in November she visited Berlin as a representative of Jakarta at the Jakarta Berlin Art Festival to commemorate the 20th anniversary of Berlin and Jakarta's Sister City relationship.

After participating in Abang None Jakarta, Muliana continued her career as a business reporter at Liputan6.com since March 2015, hosting a show called "Berani Beda". After 3 years as a journalist, Muliana received an offer to become a communication specialist at a state-owned enterprise. This was the starting point of her career in a state-owned company until now. Although she was placed in a different industry, she was in the same field, namely communication. After one year, she changed her position to Assistant to the Deputy Minister of State-Owned Enterprises. She then continued her career at MIND ID, an Indonesian state-owned enterprise engaged in the mining industry, starting from 2019 until now. She currently serves as MIND ID's Senior Associate in Human Capital.

Muliana started working as a content creator on the TikTok since February 2021. Previously, she had downloaded TikTok since 2020 but as a viewer. Subsequently, she decided to create content because of the large number of generation Z who were unfamiliar with careers and her concern to see many people having difficulty finding work in the midst of the COVID-19 pandemic. Her first video was simple. A week later, she started creating career content focusing on SOEs titled Kerja di Kementerian Rasa Start Up Check (Work at the Ministry with start-up ambience Check). After that, her video went viral and was highly appreciated by viewers. She managed to gather 100 thousand followers in the first month. Then after three months, her account already had one million followers and continued to grow to 4 million followers in February 2022.

At the Grand Final of the South Jakarta Abang None Selection held on 30 July 2022, Muliana became one of the judges who assessed ethics, behavior, and appearance.

== Education ==
Muliana pursued her undergraduate education at Padjadjaran University in the Agrotechnology from 2010 to 2014. During her studies, Muliana was selected as a delegate to attend the Harvard National Model United Nations in Boston, U.S. from 13 to 18 February 2014 along with 17 other chosen representatives. At the event, the delegation represented the countries of Ethiopia and Zimbabwe in several discussion topics. When completing her final project, Muliana postponed her thesis so that she had to delay her graduation from October 2014 to January 2015 since she participated in the Abang None Jakarta event.

While pursuing a career as a reporter, she continued her master's degree at the London School of Public Relations in the Communication Studies program with a full scholarship. She started her studies in 2015 and graduated in 2017.

== Awards and nominations ==
In her career as a content creator on TikTok, Muliana won the TikTok Awards Indonesia 2021 in the "Best of Learning & Education" category held on 25 February 2022. In February 2022, Muliana's name was included in the annual Forbes Indonesia edition of the 30 Under 30 that listed 30 young Indonesians under the age of 30 who excel in the fields of Media, Marketing, and Advertising.

| Awards | Year | Category | Nomine | Result | Ref. |
|---|---|---|---|---|---|
| TikTok Indonesia Awards | 2022 | Best of Learning & Education | Vina Muliana | Won | |
| TikTok Indonesia Awards | 2022 | Creator of the Year | Vina Muliana | Nominated | |
| TikTok Indonesia Awards | 2023 | Creator of the Year | Vina Muliana | Nominated | |
