= Rasha Rizk =

Syrian singer-songwriter (born 1976)

Rasha Rizk رشا رزق
- Born: 5 March 1976 (age 50); Damascus, Syria
- Genres: Opera, World, Arabic music, Jazz rock

Rasha Rizk (Arabic: رشا رزق; born 5 March 1976) is a Syrian singer-songwriter. She is best known for her work with the Syrian cartoon dubbing company, Venus Centre, and for singing the Arabic theme songs for popular cartoons/anime such as: Remi, Nobody's Girl, Detective Conan, Gundam Wing and the Digimon series.

In October 2017, Rizk announced on Instagram and Facebook that she had received a primary Grammy nomination in two different categories, Best New Artist and Best World Music Album for her album Malak. She has been dubbed as the "Golden Throat" by fans and journalists alike.

== Early life ==
Rizk started her formal vocal training at the age of 9, and by the age of 12, she won a children's talent competition. She studied French literature at Sorbonne University in Paris. Further, she graduated from the Higher Institute of Music in Damascus and taught opera singing there.

== Career ==
On 12 October 2003, Rizk participated in the first opera in Arabic, Ibn Sina by the Dutch composer Michiel Borstlap, in Doha, Qatar. In 2000, she and the composer Ibrahim Sulaimani started the Syrian Jazz Band Itar Shame3 (Arabic: إطار شمع).

In 2008, she worked with French new-age band Era on their songs Prayers and Reborn.

== Personal life ==
In 2003, Rizk married composer Ibrahim Sulaimani. Together they have a daughter, Sarah.

She supported the Syrian Revolution in 2011 and lives now with her family in France. Repeatedly, she expressed her intention to go back to Syria, when the conditions became appropriate, which she considered a duty toward her students.

Rasha Rizk performed theme songs for programs broadcast on Spacetoon. The following is a list of some of those songs:

== Songs ==
Title	ِPronunciation	English Translation	Ref.
سكروا الشبابيك	Sakru Shababîk	Close The Windows	
ملاك	Malak	Angel	
لو إني	Laou Inni	If i was	
موؤودة	Maou'ouda	Buried alive	
نسيتني	Nissitani	Forgot me	
مطر	matar	Rain	
Era - I Believe		I Believe	
ERA - 7 Seconds		7 Seconds	
Era.- Reborn		Reborn	
ERA - Prayers		Prayers	
بيتنا	Baytona	Our Home	
يمكن لو	Yimkin Law	Maybe if	
اللعبة	Al-Lou'ba	The Game	
بيا ولا بيك	bia wala bik	Me instead of you	
يمكني جنيت	Yemkenni Jannet	I Might Be Crazy	
يا غزالي	Ya Ghazali	Oh my dear	
يا ساكنه	ya sakinah	Hey inhabitant	
الجاذبيه	algathibiah	gravity	

== Anime/Cartoon theme songs ==
Rasha Rizk is widely famous in the Middle East for co-writing and singing the theme songs of many of the cartoon and anime films shown on Spacetoon TV channel; the most famous children TV channel in the Arabic speaking countries.

This is a list of some theme songs she sang:

Arabic Title	Original Title
الامل	Ushiro no shoumen daare
عبقور	Doraemon
سندريلا	Cindrella
عهد الأصدقاء	Romeo's Blue Skies
كابتن ماجد	Captain Tsubasa
أنا وأخي	Baby & Me [Aka-chan to Boku]
دروب ريمي	Remi, Nobody's Girl
بوكيمون	Pokémon
أنستازيا	Anastasia
الضاحكون	Animaniacs
المحقق كونان	Detective Conan
القناص	Hunter x Hunter
بي بليد	Beyblade
أبطال الديجيتال	Digimon Adventure
تاما و الأصدقاء	Tama and Friends
أجنحة كاندام	Mobile Suit Gundam Wing
فرسان الأرض	Shin Hakkenden
السيف القاطع	Lost Universe
الطاقة الزرقاء	Patapata Hikousen no Bouken
الدراج المقنع	Kamen Rider Ryuki
