= Cherrybelle =

Indonesian girl group

- Origin: Jakarta, Indonesia
- Genres: Indo pop, I-pop, dance-pop, pop, electropop, bubblegum pop
- Years active: 2011–present
- Labels: Catz Records (2011–2015); CBM Entertainment (2015–2018); Chibi Chibi Management (2022–present)
- Members: Comeback : Angel; Christy; Cherly; Kezia; Ryn; Steffy; Novi
- Past members: Devi; Wenda; Anisa; Gigi; Felly; Miftah; Ellen; Yoeriche; Laela; Onad; Muti; Tata; Atha; Fisca
- Website: cherrybelle.info

Cherrybelle, later known as Chibi Chibi, is an Indonesian girl group formed in 2011 under CBM Entertainment. The group debuted in 2011 with nine members, consisting of Angel, Anisa, Cherly, Christy, Devi, Felly, Gigi, Ryn, and Wenda. Some years after their debut, the group went through major member changes. In 2012, Devi and Wenda's contracts were terminated while Annisa departed the group in 2013; they were replaced by Kezia, Steffy, and Novi. In 2015, group-leader Cherly, along with Felly, Gigi, Kezia, Ryn, and Steffy, left the group, citing differences with their label, leaving only Angel, Christy, and Novi. Despite continuing to introduce new members, the group continued to lose members until their indefinite hiatus in mid 2018.

== History ==
=== 2011–2015: Early career and member changes ===
Cherrybelle was formed on 27 February 2011. Beginning from a meeting of two old friends, Teguh Sanjaya and Dino Raturandang, who lightly discussed their desire to form a group consisting of teenage girls, although they could not imagine how many members it would later contain. An announcement was sent through broadcast medium BlackBerry Messenger, detailing an audition for the formation of a new girl group. Dino held open auditions in Jakarta, in which 400 girls attended. After several auditions, nine girls were selected to be in the initial formation, thus conceiving a girl band that would later be named Cherrybelle. At the beginning of its formation, Chibi consisted of Angel, Anisa, Cherly, Christy, Devi, Felly, Gigi, Ryn, and Wenda. Cherrybelle is taken from two words borrowed from foreign languages, "cherry" & "belle" (beautiful in French). The philosophy behind this name was that the personnel of Cherrybelle were teenage girls who were "sweet", "adorable", "hot", & "beautiful".

After several months of training, including occasional rigorous practices lasting until 3 a.m.,, along with living together for a month to improve interpersonal relationships, in August 2011, Cherry Belle released Love is You, an EP with five tracks. The album was released as both a standard & deluxe edition. The band's 1st single, "Dilema" ("Dilemma") was released soon after and received significant airplay. Cherrybelle also performed regularly, both on television and in concert. They have also amassed numerous fans, who go by the nickname Twibies. On 8 April 2012, the group launched Love is You, a film directed by Hanny Saputra, which detailed their rise to stardom. The members portrayed a fictionalized version of themselves. The film has the same title as their 2nd single.

In April 2012, the management announced the departure of Devi and Wenda who are considered "unfitting" for the group's image due to their age. Through the audition event Cherrybelle Cari Chibi, on 8 June 2012, the management officially announced that Kezia and Steffy are the 10th and 11th members of Chibi.

Cherrybelle managed to make history as the only girl group to hold concerts in 33 Provinces within 31 days, which was held on 30 April – 31 May 2013. The concert entitled "Cherrybelle Beat Indonesia" was sponsored by PT Astra Honda Motor and Honda Beat, in order to promote the album Diam Diam Suka, and won the Record award MURI. On 18 October 2013, Anisa resigned to continue her studies, which she had put on hold for 2 years, after her absence from the group since September 2013. In the 3rd Anniversary Concert event (16 March 2014), the management officially announced the 12th member of Chibi, Novi.

Under the agency Catz Records, Cherrybelle has released 3 albums, including Love is You (2011), Diam Diam Suka (2013), and Reborn (2015). In July 2015, 6 Cherrybelle members chose not to renew their contract with the agency and chose solo careers, namely Cherly, Felly, Gigi, Kezia, Ryn, and Steffy. Through Cherrybelle's official Twitter account, the management officially announced that the remaining members, namely Christy, Angel, and Novi, will continue their careers in the group under a new agency, CBM Entertainment. On 1 September 2015, there will be a Cherrybelle new member search audition.

=== 2015–2018: New Formation and Hiatus ===
As of 22 November 2015, Cherrybelle has recruited 7 new members to fill Cherrybelle's vacancy for the past 3 months, with the new lineup being Christy, Novi, Laela, Onad, Yoeriche, Miftah, Ellen, Muti, and Tata. Angel had to give up her position in Cherrybelle to be replaced by a new member due to her focus on taking care of the household, but Angel is still active in Cherrybelle as a senior member.

In July 2016, two members of Cherrybelle formation 2015, namely Miftah and Ellen, chose to leave Cherrybelle because they wanted to wear the hijab, and in August 2016, Cherrybelle officially announced that the new members to replace Miftah and Ellen were Agatha and Fisca.

However, in September 2016, Christy officially announced that she was getting married and would be a senior member of Cherrybelle, just like Angel. And finally, Cherrybelle again held auditions for Christy's successor. For the period 2016-2017, the Cherrybelle formation is Novi, Yoeriche, Onad, Tata, Muti, Laela, Atha, and Fisca.

2017 was also Cherrybelle's year of indefinite hiatus. In March 2017, Yoeriche, April 2017, Laela, and September 2017, Novi resigned from Cherrybelle. So that Cherrybelle in 2018 only consisted of 5 people, namely Muti Chibi, Onad Chibi, Tata Chibi, Fisca Chibi, and Atha Chibi, as well as 2 senior personnel, namely Angel Chibi and Christy Chibi.

=== 2022: Come back ===
During the 11th anniversary of the group, former pioneer members reunited as "Chibi Chibi" and began appearing in numerous events. The personnel who joined the comeback were 7 people, has been Angel, Cherly, Christy, Ryn, Kezia, Steffy, and Novi.

On 15 September 2023, Chibi Chibi released a single entitled "Dilema (Dilemma)", which was the group's debut song, which was rearranged.

== Etymology ==
Cherrybelle is taken from 2 foreign language words, namely Cherry (cherries) and Belle (beautiful - French). With the philosophy that Cherrybelle personnel are "Sweet" and "Beautiful" teenage girls.

== Key peoples ==
Name	Years Longevity	Position	Labels
Teguh Sanjaya	2011-presents	Producer	CBM Entertainment
Dino Raturandang	2011–2018	Producer	CBM Entertainment
Victor Kho	2011–2013	Manager	Catz Records/Tarra Artist Management
Irza Rivai	2011–2016	Road Manager	Catz Records/Tarra Artist Management, CBM Entertainment
Deddy Wijanarko	2011–2018	Manager	Catz Records/Tarra Artist Management, CBM Entertainment
Rahma Agustina	2015–2018	Manager	CBM Entertainment

== Members ==
Stage Name	Birth Name	Birth Date	Birth Place	Years active
Devi	Aurelia Devi Noviaty	25 November 1987 (age 38)	Bandar Lampung	2011–2012
Wenda	Sarwendah Tan	29 August 1989 (age 37)	Jakarta	2011–2012
Anisa	Anisa Rahma Adi	12 October 1990 (age 35)	Bandung	2011–2013
Felly **	Yefani Filliang	21 February 1991 (age 35)	Jakarta	2011–2015
**Cherly** **	**Cherly Yuliana Anggraini**	21 July 1991 (age 35)	Pekanbaru	2011–2015; 2022-present (comeback)
**Ryn** **	**Jessyca Stefani Auryn**	30 January 1993 (age 33)	Jakarta	2011–2015; 2022-present (comeback)
Gigi **	Brigitta Cynthia	9 July 1993 (age 33)	Jakarta	2011–2015
**Kezia**	**Kezia Karamoy**	15 March 1993 (age 33)	Manado	2012–2015; 2022-present (comeback)
**Steffy** **	**Stefanny Margaretha Aay**	31 March 1993 (age 33)	Bandung	2012–2015; 2022-present (comeback)
Ellen	Ellen Nita Vindriana	2 June 1993 (age 33)	Malang	2015–2016
Miftah	Hasunal Miftah Israfani	20 February 1997 (age 29)	Langsa	2015–2016
Yori	Yoeriche Endine	8 February 1997 (age 29)	Malang	2015–2017
**Novi**	**Novi Herlina**	22 November 1993 (age 32)	Bogor	2014–2017; 2022-present (comeback)
Ela	Laela Haryadiningsih	26 August 1995 (age 31)	Bogor	2015–2017
Muti	Mutiara Dewi	25 November 1995 (age 30)	Yogyakarta	2015–2018
Tata	Redita Mutiara	3 January 1996 (age 30)	Palembang	2015–2018
Onad	Banadhi Kurnia Dewi	6 June 1997 (age 29)	Pangkal Pinang	2015–2018
Atha	Agatha Christina	5 July 1995 (age 31)	Purbalingga	2016–2018
Fisca	Aflya Fisca Alycia	21 September 1996 (age 29)	Makassar	2016–2018
**Angel**	**Margareth Angelina**	5 October 1990 (age 35)	Jakarta	2011-2015 (core); 2015-2018 (senior); 2022-present (comeback)
**Christy**	**Christy Saura Noela Unu**	26 December 1990 (age 35)	Manado	2011-2016 (core); 2016-2018 (senior); 2022-present (comeback)

* The names in bold and italics are the names of personnel who are returning to the music stage, also known as a comeback.

* Angel announced her resignation during the announcement of new personnel, Cherrybelle, which resulted in the election of 7 new personnel from the previous plan of 6 people. However, Angel (sometimes) performed with nine members, so Cherrybelle often performed with 10 personnel and fans still consider Angel remains part of Cherrybelle.

** Cherly, Ryn, Gigi, Felly, and Steffy once formed a new girl group called Mabelle (abbreviation of Mantan Cherrybelle (Cherrybelle's Formers)) on 11 November 2015, and debuted on Dahsyat television music show on RCTI on 2 April 2016. The group later reduced its members to only Felly, Ryn, and Steffy. Not long after, this group disbanded for no apparent reason.

== Discography ==
Year	Album name
2011	Love Is You
2013	Diam Diam Suka
2015	Reborn
2016	Cherrybelle Compilation Album (DIGITAL ALBUM)

== Filmography ==
- Love is You (2012)
- Crush (2014)
