= Wishnutama =

Indonesian journalist and businessman (born 1972)

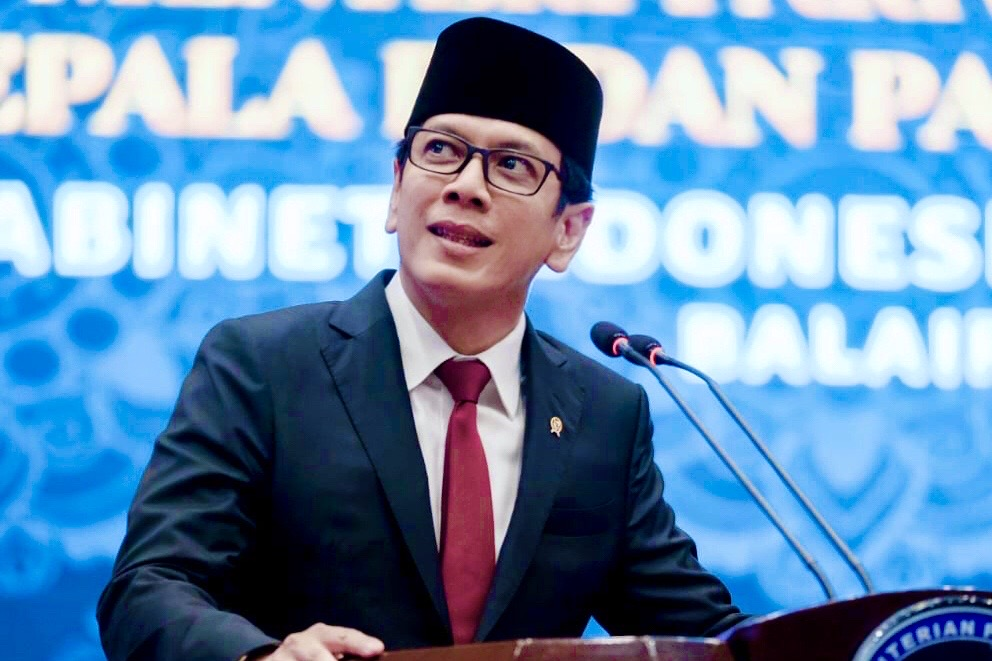
- Wishnutama in 2019

10th Minister of Tourism and Creative Economy
- In office 23 October 2019 – 23 December 2020
- President: Joko Widodo
- Deputy: Angela Tanoesoedibjo
- Preceded by: Arief Yahya
- Succeeded by: Sandiaga Uno

Personal details
- Born: Wishnutama Kusubandio; 4 May 1970 (age 56) Jayapura, Indonesia
- Spouse: Gista Putri (m. 2015)
- Children: 5
- Occupation: Commissioner Tokopedia; President Commissioner Telkomsel; Commissioner GoTo
- Known for: NET., Indosiar, Trans Media and Asian Games 2018

Wishnutama Kusubandio (born 4 May 1970) is a former Indonesian journalist and businessman. He was co-founder and CEO of NET. Mediatama Television and NET. Visi Media Asia, from founding on 18 May 2013 until his resignation on 22 October 2019. He served as Minister of Tourism and Creative Economy under Joko Widodo between 23 October 2019 and 22 December 2020. His deputy minister before being called off was Angela Tanoesoedibjo.

== Early life and education ==
Wishnutama was born in Jayapura, Indonesia on 4 May 1970. He spent his junior high at SMP Tarakanita 5 in Jakarta. After he graduated, he moved to Australia and went to Kooralbyn International School, Brisbane, Queensland, then continued studying at the International School Singapore. After finishing ISS, he joined the Military College of Vermont at Norwich University in the United States of America. Later on, he took a major in Liberal Arts at Mount Ida College and Communication at Emerson College, Boston, USA. He attended a television production course at Emerson College, participated in various executive education programs including GE Crotonville Leadership Institute, New York and Harvard Business School, Boston, Massachusetts.

== Career ==
Wishnutama undertook an internship as a production assistant at New England Cable News. After graduating from Mount Ida College in 1994 (now part of the University of Massachusetts Amherst), he joined WHDH7, an NBC affiliate in Boston.

In 1994, he returned to Indonesia and worked as an on-air promo supervisor in the Programming Department at Indosiar (then-owned by Salim Group). A year later, he became a production assistant and went on to become a news executive producer. In 1999, he then advanced to production manager. During his time at Indosiar, he had contributed to produce several programs such as Pesta, Gebyar BCA, Patroli, Halo Polisi, Satu Jam Bersama, and Saksi

In 2001, he decided to move to Trans TV as vice president of production and after two years, he became operational director; a year later he was promoted to managing director. In 2006, he was appointed as a president director (CEO) at TV7 (which later on changed its name to Trans7). Two years later, he became a president director (CEO) at Trans Media until he resigned in 2012. During his leading at Trans Media, he had produced several programs, including Extravaganza, Dunia Lain, Termehek-Mehek, Opera Van Java, On The Spot, and Indonesia Mencari Bakat.

After he left Trans Corp, Wishnutama and Agus Lasmono established a new television station in Indonesia. A year later, on 26 May 2013, NET. officially began airing. On 2 November 2017, Wishnutama officially became a Commissioner for Kumparan along with Budiono Darsono, Hugo Diba, Ine Yordenaya, Heru Tjatur, and Yusuf Arifin. He was appointed as the creative director of the opening and closing ceremonies for the Asian Games 2018.

On 23 October 2019, Wishnutama was elected as minister of tourism and creative economy by Joko Widodo. He was replaced by Sandiaga Uno on 22 December 2020.

=== Experiences ===
- Production assistant New England Cable News, Massachusetts, USA (1993)
- Assistant director on-air promotion WHDH, Boston, Massachusetts, USA (1994)
- On-air promo supervisor, Programming Dept. Indosiar (1994–1995)
- Producer and director, Production Dept, Indosiar (1995–1997)
- Executive producer, Indosiar (1997–1998)
- Section head Production Dept, Indosiar (1998–1999)
- Production Manager, Indosiar (1999–2001)
- Production and Facilities Division head, PT Televisi Transformasi Indonesia (2001–2012)
- Director of operation (COO), PT Televisi Transformasi Indonesia (2004–2005)
- Vice president director, PT Televisi Transformasi Indonesia (2005–2008)
- President director (CEO), PT Duta Visual Nusantara Tivi Tujuh (TRANS7) (2006–2008)
- Director of production, PT Duta Visual Nusantara Tivi Tujuh (TRANS7) (2006–2012)
- President director (CEO), PT Televisi Transformasi Indonesia (TRANS TV) (2008–2012)
- Director PT Agranet (Detik.com) (2011–2012)
- President director (CEO) PT Net Mediatama Televisi (2013–2019)
- Advisory board members Asian Television Awards (2016–present)
- Creative director, opening and closing ceremonies Asian Games 2018 (2016–2018)
- Chairman ATVNI (National Television Association Indonesia) (2017–2019)
- Commissioner Kumparan.com (2017–2019)
- Commissioner Tokopedia (2019, 2021–present)
- National Scout Advisory Board (2018–2023)
- Chairman PT Net Mediatama Televisi (2019)
- Minister of Tourism and Creative Economy of the Republic of Indonesia (2019–2020)
- President commissioner PT Telekomunikasi Seluler (Telkomsel) (2021–2025)
- Commissioner PT GoTo Gojek Tokopedia Tbk (GoTo) (2022–present)

During nearly 20 years of work, he has won several awards, including the Asian Television Award and Panasonic Awards. He was chosen as the Best CEO in Indonesia 2010 by SWA magazine.

In 2015, Wishnutama received an award of Indonesia Marketing Champion 2015 for the Broadcast, TV Pay & Media Sector by MarkPlus Conference. This award is given to 18 people who excel in 18 industrial sectors. A year later, he was ranked 149th in the 500 Most Influential CEOs in the world according to Richtopia.com. He was also named the Best Chief Strategy Execution Officer in the category of Best Execution Leaders by the (SPEx2) Awards in 2016.

On 27 September 2017, Wishnutama received an award in Best Digital Talent category for the sub category of Digital Business Leader by Bubu Awards. NET. CJ's official website was listed as a nominee in Best Website category for the sub category News and Entertainment. He was selected to receive an award from Ideafest 2017 x Samsung Galaxy Note8 for Indonesia's Influential Person in Creative Industry (October 2017).

=== Awards ===
- Indonesia Youngster Inc. by SWA Magazine
- Best CEO by SWA Magazine in 2010
- The Best Chief Strategy Execution Officer Across All Industries by Tempo Media Group
- The Winner of 2016 Strategy-Into-Performance Execution Excellence (SPEX2) Awards
- In 2023, Wishnutama Kusubandio was bestowed the Bintang Mahaputera Nararya (‘Star of Mahaputera’), one of Indonesia’s highest national honors, by the president of the Republic of Indonesia

== Indonesian National Television Association (ATVNI) ==
Wishnutama is also listed as a chairman of the board of ATVNI (Asosiasi Televisi Nasional Indonesia), which was officially launched on 10 September 2017. Three national television media; PT Cipta Megaswara Televisi (Kompas TV), PT Net Mediatama Televisi (NET.), and PT Metropolitan Televisindo (RTV) signed the establishment of the Indonesian National Television Association (ATVNI). ATVNI aims to provide more open information that led to the birth of content that is not educational and can not be accounted for.

ATVNI is established by the deed number 59 dated 25 August 2017 and taking Edward Suharjo Wiryomartani as the notary. ATVNI has a main purpose to be independent as well as to provide the objective information to audiences and avoid the interests of SARA, pornography, and uphold the social, legal, and moral norms.

Beside Wishnutama, the committee also consists of Mochmad Riyanto as General Secretary, Yonatan Stefanus Palulungan as treasurer, Satrio as supervisory board, Charlie Kasim as vice president supervisory, and Azuan Syahril as a member of supervisory board.

== Personal life ==
On 20 September 2015, he married actress and presenter Gista Putri. In his leisure time, he formed a band called Soulful Corp. He is also passionate about photography.
