= Dancing in the Rain (2018 film) =

2018 Indonesian film

- Theatrical release poster
- Directed by: Rudi Aryanto
- Written by: Sukhdev Singh; Tisa TS
- Produced by: Sukhdev Singh; Wicky V. Olindo
- Starring: Dimas Anggara; Bunga Zainal; Deva Mahenra; Christine Hakim; Niniek L. Karim; Djenar Maesa Ayu; Gilang Olivier; Joshua Rundengan; Greesella Adhalia; Dolly Martin; Keke Soeryo; Qory Sandioriva; Ayu Dyah Pasha; Agus Lemu; Tuminten
- Cinematography: Rama Hermawan; Adam Ojen
- Edited by: Wawan I. Wibowo
- Music by: Joseph S. Djafar
- Production company: Screenplay Films
- Release dates: October 10, 2018 (Tangcity XXI); October 18, 2018 (Indonesia)
- Running time: 101 minutes
- Country: Indonesia
- Language: Indonesian

Dancing in the Rain is a 2018 Indonesian family film produced by Screenplay Films in association with Legacy Pictures. Directed by Rudi Aryanto, it was produced by Sukhdev Singh and Wicky V. Olindo from a screenplay Singh co-wrote with Tisa TS. The film stars Dimas Anggara, Bunga Zainal, Deva Mahenra and Christine Hakim. Dancing in the Rain follows Banyu, a young boy on the autism spectrum, who made friends with Radin and Kinara.

Dancing in the Rain was premiered at Tangcity XXI on October 10, 2018, and was released in Indonesia eight days later.

== Synopsis ==
Uti owns an autistic grandson named Banyu. When Banyu enters school, Uti explains that he has a psychological disability, which is harmful. Later, Banyu made friends with Radin, who defended him from bullies. Then a girl named Kinara arrived, completing Banyu and Radin's friendship. As they grew up, Radin's mother started to hate him, resulting in Banyu dying in a truck accident.

== Cast ==
- Dimas Anggara as Banyu
  - Gilang Olivier as young Banyu
- Bunga Zainal as Kinara
  - Greesella Adhalia as young Kinara
- Deva Mahenra as Radin
  - Joshua Rundengan as young Radin
- Christine Hakim as Uti
- Niniek L. Karim as Widya
- Djenar Maesa Ayu as Radin's mother (Note: Despite being named Katrin, the character is credited as "Mama Radin" (Radin's mother).)
- Dolly Martin as Kinara's father
- Keke Soeryo as Kinara's mother (uncredited)
- Qory Sandioriva as a teacher
- Ayu Dyah Pasha as a psychologist (uncredited)
- Eko Mulyadi as a chef
- Agus Lemu as a driver
- Tuminten as an assistant
- Firdha Razak
- Erwin St. Bagindo as doctor
- Aswin Fabanyo as doctor
- Agus Julian as Radin's father
- Adi Juardi as an announcer
- Putri Winda Sari as a television presenter

== Production ==
=== Casting ===
The principal characters were cast in May 2018. Bunga Zainal, who portrays Kinara, states that the character was only 21 years old in the film.

== Release ==
=== Marketing ===
The trailer and poster were released on September 1, 2018, alongside its cast and soundtrack "Bintang Di Hati" ("Stars in Heart") by Melly Goeslaw.

=== Theatrical and streaming ===
Dancing in the Rain received a gala premiere at Tangcity Mall on October 10, 2018. It was theatrically released eight days later, alongside Generasi Micin vs Kevin. On November 5, 2020, it was added to Vidio, and Amazon Prime Video followed in 2022. (Note: Attributed to multiple references:)

=== Broadcast ===
Dancing in the Rain made its television premiere in Indonesia on SCTV on May 8, 2022, at 2pm local time.

== Critical reception ==
Dancing in the Rain received generally positive reviews from The Jakarta Post and IDN Times.

== Awards and nominations ==
Year	Award	Category	Nominee	Result	Ref.
2019	Festival Film Bandung	Most Commendable Lead Actor	Dimas Anggara	Won	
2019	Anugerah Musik Indonesia	Best Production Work for Visual Media	"Bintang Di Hati" by Melly Goeslaw	Nominated	
