= TATV =

Canadian French-language TV channel

- Country: Canada
- Broadcast area: National
- Headquarters: Montreal, Quebec

Programming
- Picture format: 480i (SDTV)

Ownership
- Owner: Vidéotron (1986-1998); Radiomutuel (1998-2000); Astral Media (2000-2008)

History
- Launched: 1986
- Closed: August 19, 2008
- Former names: Les Annonces Illustrées de Vidéotron (1986-1996); Télé-Classée (1996-1997); Télé-Annonces (1997-2006)

TATV (Tout Acheter Tout Vendre), previously known as Télé-Annonces, was a Canadian French language cable television channel and website owned by Astral Media broadcasting 24 hours a day classified ads from individuals and merchants. It was offered exclusively in Quebec by the cable companies Vidéotron and Cogeco.

TATV was an illustrated classified advertising service, offering individuals and businesses the means to sell goods and services via television and the Internet. TATV was primarily a regionalised service, covering 16 different regions in Quebec, each being served by a local TATV channel. The regions were:

- West of Montreal
- East of Montreal
- Laval
- South Shore of Montreal
- Montérégie
- North Shore of Montreal
- Laurentides
- Lanaudière
- Sherbrooke
- Quebec City
- Saguenay–Lac-Saint-Jean
- Granby
- Mauricie
- Drummond/Yamaska
- Gaspésie
- Outaouais
- Beauce
- Victoriaville
- Thetford Mines
- Rivière-du-Loup

TATV was classified as a shopping television service by the Canadian Radio-television and Telecommunications Commission (CRTC) and, thus, was exempt from requiring a CRTC-issued licence to operate and most other CRTC requirements that pay TV and specialty channels are subject to.

== History ==
In 1986, Vidéotron launched Les Annonces Illustrées de Vidéotron, a specialty TV channel in illustrated classified advertising service, for individuals.

In 1987, a specialty TV channel in real estate classified advertising was launched under the name of Immeubles Télé-Vidéo, then rebranded Télé-Immeubles. In August 1996, Télé-Immeubles TV channel was added to Les Annonces Illustrées de Vidéotron TV channel. Following the combination of Télé-Immeubles and Les Annonces Illustrées de Vidéotron on a single TV channel, the channel was rebranded Télé-Classée.

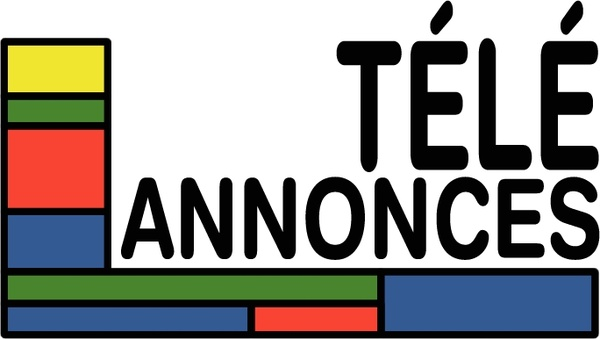
Logo of Télé-Annonces used from 1997 until 2003

Logo of Télé-Annonces used from 2003 until 2006

In 1997, Télé-Classée was rebranded Télé-Annonces.

In November 1998, Télé-Annonces, ownership of Vidéotron, became the ownership of Radiomutuel. In January 2000, Radiomutuel was bought by Astral Media.

In response to growing popularity of online classified ad services, Télé-Annonces was rebranded TATV on June 6, 2006, repositioning itself primarily as an online service, supported by a television channel.

On August 19, 2008, Astral Media announced the immediate closure of TATV. The company stated the growing market share of classified ads using the free Internet model, coupled with the fact that classified ads are not one of the company's core businesses, were the reasons for the closure of TATV.
