= Bambang Sutrisno =

- Born: 10 September 1941 (age 85); Jakarta, Indonesia.
- Citizenship: Indonesia
- Known for: One of the top wanted criminals from Indonesia, fled his country, last known to be living in Singapore.

Bambang Sutrisno (born in 1941) is one of the top wanted Indonesian fugitive who is living in Singapore with his family which comprises two sons—the youngest of whom is Hansen Sutrisno, born in 1985 and educated in Singapore and London—and a daughter, Chelsea Amanda Sutrisno.

== Biography ==
Bambang Sutrisno begin building his fortune by working together with brother Benny Suherman and Suwikatmono, the cousin of then President Suharto, to establish 21 Cineplex. 21 Cineplex hosted 650 movie screens in Indonesia. In the mid-1980s. Bambang left PT Suptan Film to start up his own supermarket chain business, the well-known Golden Truly chain, in Indonesia. He also set up Bank Surya. These businesses were once again set up with the help and connections of Suwikatmono, the cousin of then President Suharto. In 1997, during the economic financial crisis, the Indonesian government gave banks such as Bank Surya bailout money and Bambang Sutrisno embezzled 1.5 trillion Indonesian rupiah, the equivalent of around 200 million US dollars. Before he could be arrested, Bambang Sutrisno fled to neighbouring Singapore where he has obtained Permanent Resident status. Bambang Sutrisno was convicted of embezzlement in absentia in 1999 and sentenced to life imprisonment.
