= MDTV Media Technologies =

Indonesian media and entertainment company

PT MDTV Media Technologies Tbk

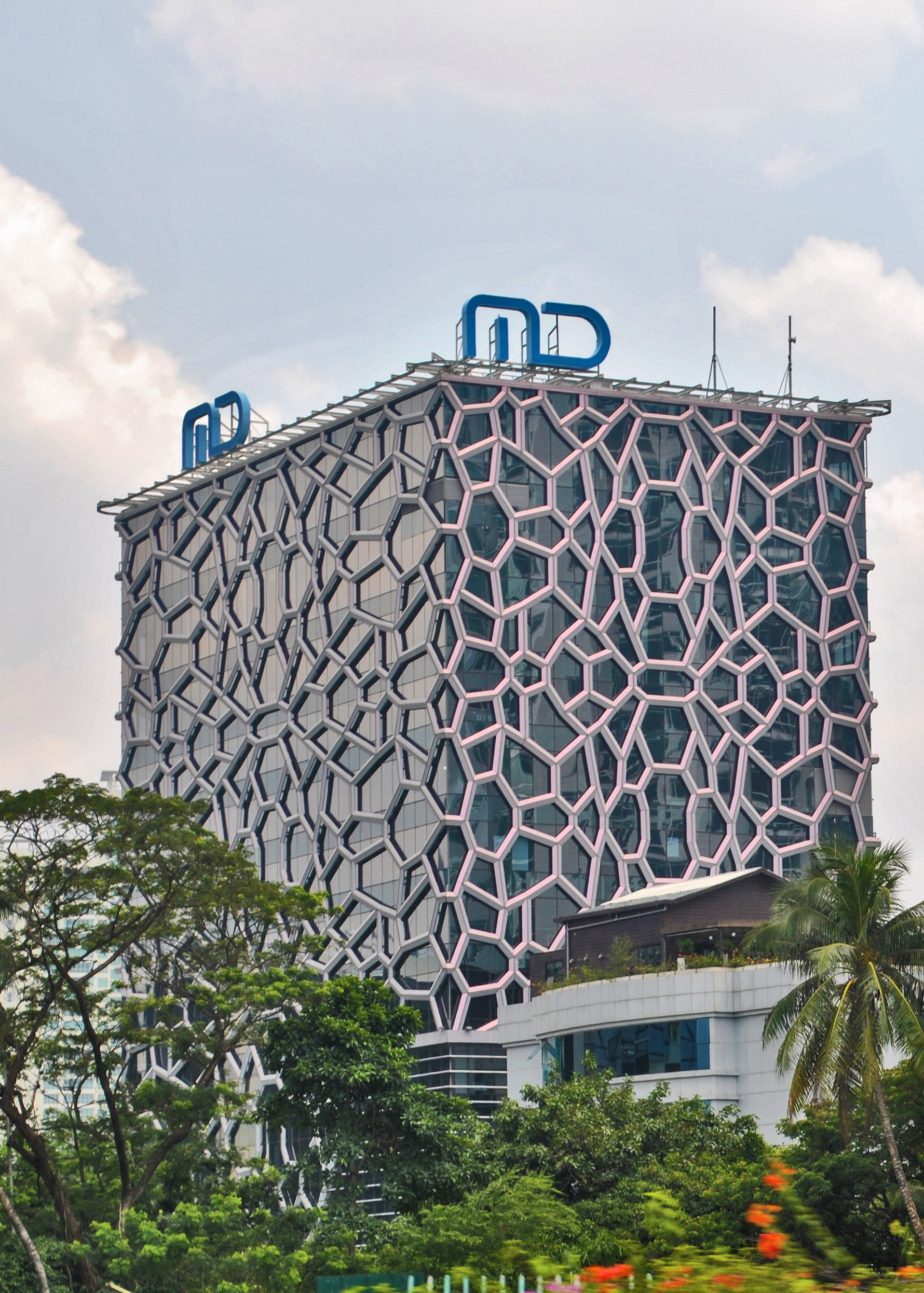
- MD Place in Jakarta
- Formerly: PT Putra Insan Permata (2004—2017); PT Net Visi Media Tbk (2017—2024)
- Company type: Public
- Traded as: IDX: NETV
- ISIN: ID1000165905
- Industry: Media
- Founded: 23 July 2004; 21 years ago in Jakarta, Indonesia
- Headquarters: MD Place, Jl. Setiabudi Selatan No. 7, Jakarta, Indonesia
- Key people: Halim Lie (President Director); Manoj Punjabi (Main Commissioner)
- Owner: see list
- Subsidiaries: see list
- Website: www.mdtelevision.com

PT MDTV Media Technologies Tbk is an Indonesian company engaged in the media industry, covering the fields of television broadcasting, content production, artist management, and digital media. This company is the holding company of MDTV and is majority owned by MD Entertainment, led by the film and television series producer Manoj Punjabi.

== History ==
Originally, the company was established on 23 July 2004 under the name PT Putra Insan in Jakarta. On 23 March 2017, the company changed its name to PT Net Visi Media.

After making various preparations, the company was officially listed on the Indonesia Stock Exchange on 26 January 2022.

The company announced on 8 October and 7 November 2024 that there was a change in management in connection with the company's acquisition process by the owner of MD Entertainment, Manoj Punjabi. Then on 8 November 2024, the company officially changed its name to PT MDTV Media Technologies Tbk.

== Ownership ==
The following is a list of company ownership based on the monthly report of securities holder registration as of December 30, 2024.

Shareholder Name	Percentage of Ownership (%)
Class A
PT MD Entertainment Tbk (FILM)	19,07
PT Sinergi Lintas Media	2,62
PT Semangat Bambu Runcing	2,47
PT Indika Inti Holdiko	0,57
Other (Public)	3,62
Class B
PT MD Entertainment Tbk (FILM)	60,98
PT Karya Media Investindo	8,00
Other (Public)	2,67
Total	100%

== Subsidiary ==
The following is a list of the company's subsidiaries based on material information and fact reports as of December 31, 2024.

Subsidiary Name	Percentage of Ownership (%)
PT Industri Mitra Media	99,73
Acquisition through Industri Mitra Media
PT MDTV Media Televisi	26,20
PT MDTV Media Berita	0,69
PT MDTV Media Digital	12,86
PT Kreatif Inti Korpora	4,54
