= Animation International =

Film distributor in Hong Kong

Animation International Ltd.
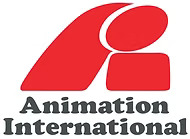
- Industry: Film distribution, publishing, licensing
- Founded: 1979; 47 years ago
- Headquarters: 23/F, Times Tower, 391-407 Jaffe Road, Wan Chai, Hong Kong
- Area served: Worldwide

Animation International Ltd. (Chinese: 國際影業有限公司) is a company based in Wan Chai, Hong Kong. The company was established in 1979 and focuses on film distribution, publishing and licensing. They export and license animation in China, Hong Kong, Macau, the Middle East, Southeast Asia (including the Philippines) and Taiwan. The company is best known for distributing the Doraemon franchise in many countries and regions.

== History ==
In 1996 they established Animation International (Thailand) Co., Ltd. as a joint venture with JSL Co., Ltd.

The company announced plans to establish places for products related to the Doraemon franchise in electronics stores and in some Laox stores as well as a dedicated store which opened in 2013. I The company still occasionally opens up pop-up stores with Doraemon related products.
