= MDTV =

Indonesian television broadcaster

- Type: Television broadcaster
- Country: Indonesia
- Broadcast area: Nationwide
- Headquarters: MD Place, Jl. Setiabudi Selatan No. 7, South Jakarta, Indonesia

Programming
- Language: Indonesian
- Picture format: 1080p HDTV

Ownership
- Owner: MDTV Media Technologies; Industri Mitra Media
- Parent: MD Entertainment
- Key people: Surya Hadiwinata (President Director); Manoj Punjabi (Main Commissioner)

History
- Launched: 26 May 2013
- Founder: Agus Lasmono; Wishnutama
- Replaced: Spacetoon Indonesia (2005–2013, terrestrial); MD Channel (2014–2016); MD Entertainment TV (2018–2019)
- Former names: NET. (2013—2025)

Links
- Website: www.mdtelevision.com

Availability

Terrestrial
- Digital terrestrial television: In Greater Jakarta: Channels 16, 34, 40 (UHF); Full list: see Indonesian Wikipedia

PT MDTV Media Televisi (MDTV, formerly known as NET. and Spacetoon Indonesia) is an Indonesian private television broadcaster owned by MDTV Media Technologies and Industri Mitra Media. It began trial broadcasts as NET. on 18 May 2013 and officially launched on 26 May 2013, replacing the terrestrial feed of Spacetoon Indonesia.

== History ==
The NET. logo, used from 2013 to 2024, last appeared alongside the MDTV logo for on-air purposes until the full rebranding on 28 February 2025.

In 2012, PT Net Mediatama Indonesia was established. In May 2013, the company acquired PT Televisi Anak Spacetoon (Spacetoon). On the 18th, NET. launched its trial broadcast using Spacetoon’s terrestrial frequencies, while Spacetoon’s programming was restricted to pay television.

Spacetoon’s programming continued under a block called “NET Playground” or “NET Toon,” which aired on weekday afternoons. This ended a year later but was revived on 15 December 2018 to feature Cartoon Network shows, previously broadcast on Trans TV from 2016 to 2018.

On 3 April 2015, NET. became the main sponsor of the football club Persija Jakarta for the 2015 Indonesia Super League. The following day, the network was also announced as a major sponsor of Persija’s rival, Persib Bandung, for the same period.

NET. broadcast the Premier League from 2019 to 2021, succeeding TVRI, which held rights under license from Mola TV. The rights later transferred to SCTV in 2021.

On 25 November 2020, NET. faced a Suspension of Debt Payment Obligation (PKPU) claim from Bambang Sutrisno. The claim was withdrawn on 4 December 2020 after NET. repaid its Rp2.5 billion debt. Another PKPU claim from PT Seribu Layar Sinema was withdrawn in January 2021 following repayment of Rp13.7 billion.

In October 2024, MD Entertainment, a production company owned by Manoj Punjabi, expanded into broadcasting by acquiring a 60.98% stake in NET. Following the acquisition, Manoj and his wife, Shania, joined the board of directors on 10 October. On 5 November, Manoj, Shania, and Dian Adhitama resigned from their respective positions as Director General, Commissioner General, and Independent Commissioner. Two days later, Manoj officially announced the company’s legal name change from PT Net Visi Media to PT MDTV Media Technologies, following approval at a shareholders’ meeting. On 28 February 2025, NET. officially rebranded as MDTV.

== See also ==
- List of television stations in Indonesia
- Television in Indonesia
