= Venus Centre =

Syrian dubbing studio

- Type: Dubbing studio
- Industry: Arts; Animation
- Founded: 1991; 35 years ago
- Founder: Mannaa Hijazi; Fayez Al-Sabbagh; Maher Al-Hajj Weiss
- Headquarters: Free Zone, Damascus, Syria
- Area served: MENA region
- Key people: Muhammad Al-Qazza (CEO)
- Parent: Global New Age Media

Venus Centre (Arabic: مركز الزُّهرة) is a Syrian dubbing studio. Venus Centre specializes in dubbing animation and children's programs to the Arabic language, especially Japanese anime. The company is based in Damascus.

== History ==
Venus Centre was founded in 1991.

== Series ==
- The Pink Panther (Young Future)
- Dragon Booster (Eastern Vision S.A.)
- Little Bear (Eastern Vision S.A.)
- The Bots Master
- Foofur (Young Future Entertainment)
- Anatole (Eastern Vision S.A.)
- Casper and the Angels (Young Future)
  - The Spooktacular New Adventures of Casper (Young Future Entertainment)
  - Casper's Scare School (Young Future Entertainment)
- The Scooby-Doo Show (Young Future Entertainment)
  - Scooby-Doo! in Arabian Nights (Young Future Entertainment)
  - What's New, Scooby-Doo? (first dub) (Young Future Entertainment)
- Tiny Toon Adventures
- Baby Looney Tunes
- The Road Runner Show (Young Future Entertainment)
- Taz-Mania (Young Future Entertainment)
- ALF: The Animated Series
- Franklin (Eastern Vision S.A.)
- The All-New Popeye Hour (Season 1: Tele-Pictures Promoters International Season 2: Eastern Vision S.A.)
  - Popeye & Son (Eastern Vision S.A.)
- Rupert (Eastern Vision S.A.)
- The Flintstones (Young Future Entertainment)
- The Jetsons
- Bruno the Kid (Tele-Pictures Promoters International)
- Fabulous Funnies (Tele-Pictures Promoters International)
- Police Academy (Young Future Entertainment)
- Hurricanes (Young Future Entertainment)
- Camp Candy (Young Future Entertainment)
- Make Way for Noddy (Young Future Entertainment)
- The Mask (Young Future)
- Batman: The Animated Series (first dub) (Young Future Entertainment)
- Krypto the Superdog (Cartoon Star)
- Street Sharks (Tele-Pictures Promoters International)
- Happy Ness: Secret of the Loch (Tele-Pictures Promoters International)
- Captain Simian & the Space Monkeys (Young Future Entertainment)
- Stone Protectors (Young Future Entertainment)
- Teenage Mutant Ninja Turtles (1987) (Tele Pictures Promotera International) (replacing Fimali Productions Sarl)
- ¡Mucha Lucha! (first dub)
- Animaniacs (Young Future Entertainment)
  - Pinky and the Brain (Young Future Entertainment)
- Street Fighter (Young Future)
- Mortal Kombat: Defenders of the Realm (Tele-Pictures Promoters International)
- ProStars (Young Future Entertainment)
  - Super Mario World (Tele-Pictures Promoters International)
- The Secret Lives of Waldo Kitty (Tele-Pictures Promoters International)
- Adventures of Sonic the Hedgehog (Tele-Pictures Promoters International)
  - Sonic the Hedgehog (Young Future Entertainment)
- The Wacky World of Tex Avery (Cartoon Star)
- The Twisted Tales of Felix the Cat (Tele-Pictures Promoters International)
- Flower Witch Mary Bell (Eastern Vision S.A.)
- Birdz (Eastern Vision S.A.)
- Pound Puppies (Young Future)
- Ultraforce (Tele-Pictures Promoters International)
- Sheep in the Big City (Young Future Entertainment)
- The Adventures of Sam & Max: Freelance Police (Eastern Vision S.A.)
- All-New Dennis the Menace (Tele-Pictures Promoters International)
- Double Dragon (Tele-Pictures Promoters International)
- Rescue Heroes (Eastern Vision S.A.)
- Bump in the Night (Young Future Entertainment)
- Dexter's Laboratory (Young Future Entertainment)
- Exosquad (Young Future Entertainment)
- Dumb and Dumber
- Beast Wars: Transformers
  - Beast Machines: Transformers
- Action Man
- Tom & Jerry Kids (Young Future)
- Woody Woodpecker (Young Future)
- Where on Earth Is Carmen Sandiego? (Cartoon Star)
- Fifi and the Flowertots (first dub) (Cartoon Star)
- What-a-Mess (Cartoon Star) (DiC Version only)
- Adventures from the Book of Virtues (Cartoon Star)
- Peanuts (Young Future)
- Madeline
- Wild West C.O.W.-Boys of Moo Mesa (Young Future Entertainment)
- SWAT Kats: The Radical Squadron (Young Future)
- Cabbage Patch Kids
- Sealab 2021 (Young Future Entertainment)
- Super Duper Sumos (Cartoon Star)
- Codename: Kids Next Door (Young Future)
- Iron Kid (Cartoon Star)
- The Toy Warrior (Cartoon Star)
- Watership Down (Al Sayyar Art Prod.)
- Wolverine and the X-Men
- The Magic School Bus (Tele-Pictures Promoters International)
- Phantom 2040 (Tele-Pictures Promoters International)
- Ben 10 (Young Future)
- Strawberry Shortcake (Cartoon Star)
- Inspector Gadget's Field Trip (Young Future Entertainment)
- The Mr. Men Show
- Zootopia

== See also ==
- Spacetoon
- Animation International
