= Nabila Taqiyyah =

Indonesian singer (born 2005)

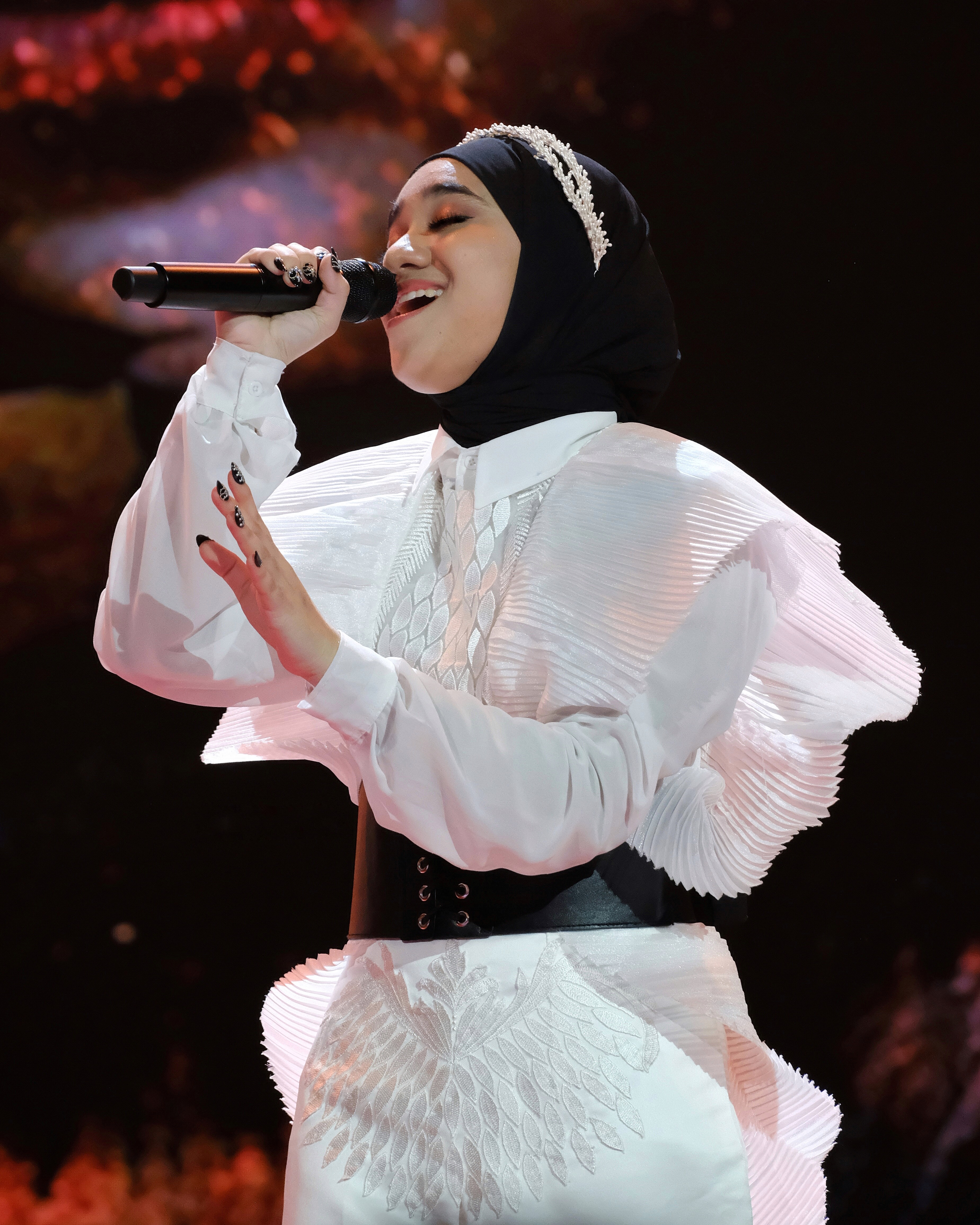
- Nabila in 2023
- Born: 21 November 2005 (age 20); Banda Aceh, Aceh, Indonesia
- Occupations: Singer; Actress; MC; content creator
- Years active: 2020–present
- Agent: Star Media Nusantara
- Musical career
- Genre: Pop
- Instrument: Vocal
- Years active: 2023–now
- Label: Universal

Nabila Taqiyyah (born 21 November 2005) is an Indonesian singer from Banda Aceh, Aceh. She is known as the runner-up of the twelfth season of Indonesian Idol, a talent search competition broadcast on RCTI in 2022–2023. At the beginning of her career in the music industry, she joined the record label Universal Music Indonesia and released the winning song of Indonesian Idol, "Menghargai Kata Rindu."

== Early life ==
Nabila was born on 21 November 2005 in Banda Aceh, Aceh. She was born to Fachri Nugraha Syahputra and Nelli Maulidar as well as the eldest of seven children. Nabila has six younger siblings: Nadya Syakirah, Nayla Ashilah, Nadhifa Athiyah, Nadien Latifah, Nasywa Geubrina Rizki, and Muhammad Gaza Al Ghazali.

Nabila's father was once a member of the Indonesian National Police in Aceh. He decided to resign from the police service when Nabila's family moved from Aceh to Jakarta to support her dream of becoming a singer. Before leaving for Jakarta, Nabila's father claimed to have an acquaintance who was expected to help Nabila pursue her singing career. However, upon arriving in Jakarta, the family's expectations did not match with reality. As a result, the family experienced a significant economic downturn, and both of her parents even worked as street vendors at one point.

Although she does not come from an artistic family and none of her family members are involved in the arts, Nabila became the first person in her family to pursue a career in the arts. Her interest in singing began at five. While she was still in kindergarten, Nabila aspired to become a singer. However, during junior high school, her ambition shifted to becoming a policewoman due to the influence of her father, who often invited her in police-related activities. She was fascinated by the profession and even took part in physical training for the policewoman entrance test. Upon entering senior high school at State Senior High School 3 Banda Aceh, her ambition returned to what it had been in kindergarten, becoming a singer. This change was driven by her experience as a content creator, which ultimately led her to decide to pursue a career in the entertainment industry as a singer.

== Career ==
=== 2020–2022: Early career ===
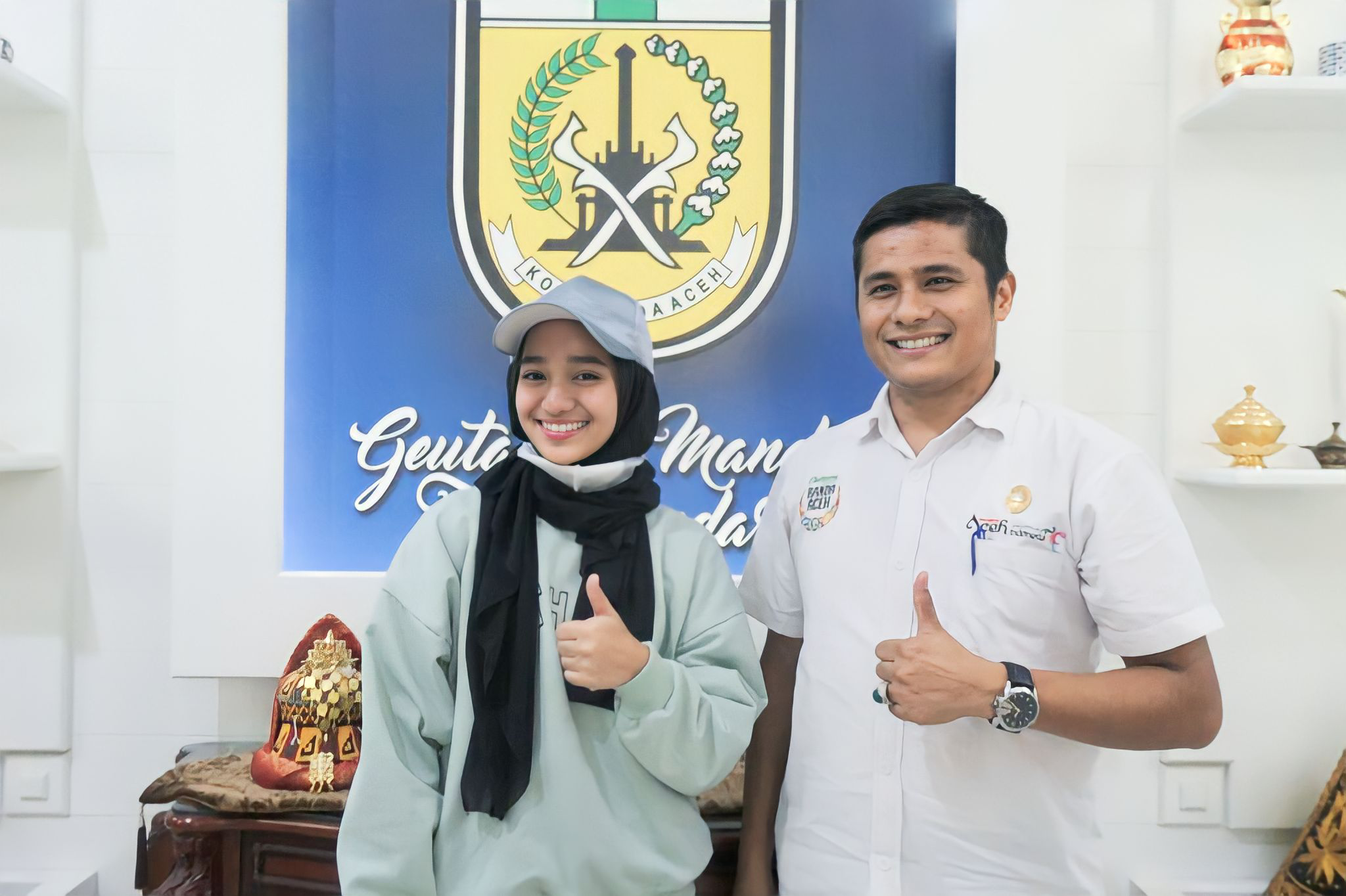
Nabila's farewell at the Banda Aceh Tourism Office when she was invited to Kick Andy.

Nabila began her career as a content creator at 16, while she was in junior high school. She uploaded singing videos to her personal YouTube channel, including videos of her singing on Ome TV. Since 2020, Nabila has released several songs, including "Jangan Pergi Lagi," her debut single. In May 2021, Nabila gained popularity after a video of her singing "We Will Not Go Down" by Michael Heart and an Arabic-language song titled "Atouna El Toufouley" that caused an Israeli soldier to cry. This success led to her being invited to the talk show Kick Andy in April 2022, in the episode titled "Gitar Getarkan Dunia," which marked her first appearance on television. In the interview, Nabila explained that she created the concept of singing while simultaneously spreading a message of peace through her Ome TV content. On 7 July 2021, Nabila was awarded the Silver Creator Award from YouTube after her channel reached 100,000 subscribers. Her subscriber count later increased to 631,000 by February 2022.

As of July 2022, Nabila had more than 44,000 followers on Instagram. As part of the commemoration of the 76th Bhayangkara anniversary, she was invited to perform on the main stage of the Bhayangkara Seulawah Expo (BSE) 2022 at Harapan Bangsa Stadium, Lhong Raya, Banda Aceh, on 20 July 2022.

=== 2022–now: Indonesian Idol ===
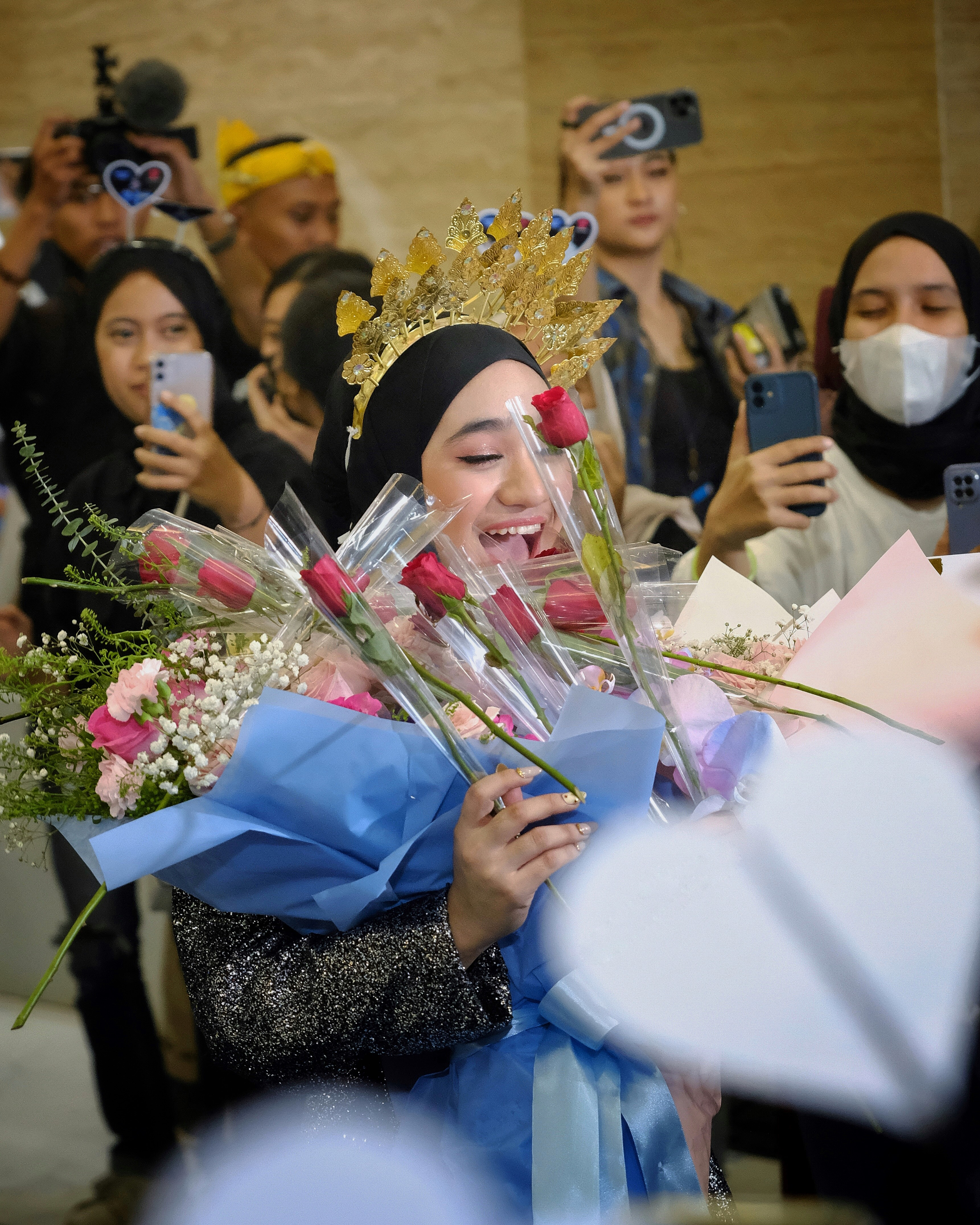
Nabila was welcomed by fans after successfully advancing to the grand final round of Indonesian Idol.

In 2022, Nabila decided to participate in the twelfth season of the talent search competition Indonesian Idol. During the stage audition round in Jakarta, she sang "Belum Siap Kehilangan" by Stevan Pasaribu. Her performance impressed the judges, and Nabila earned a golden ticket after receiving three "yes" votes.

After passing the auditions, Nabila continued to advance through the subsequent rounds of the Indonesian Idol competition. She performed various songs with deep emotion and showcased strong vocals, impressing both the judges and the audience. Round after round, Nabila succeeded in convincing the judges with her consistent performances and exceptional vocal talent. She even had the opportunity to duet with Tiara Andini on the Indonesian Idol stage, performing the song "Merasa Indah." Nabila admitted that she is a fan of Tiara Andini and was delighted that her idol was invited to perform a duet with her.

Performance on the twelfth season of Indonesian Idol.
Episode	Date	Song – original artist	Results	Notes
Audition	2 January 2023	"Belum Siap Kehilangan" – Stevan Pasaribu	Golden Ticket	
Elimination 1 (The Crucial 60')	3 January 2023	"Demi Waktu" – Ungu	Advanced	Group 6
Elimination 2 (Best Cover)	9 January 2023	"Risalah Hati" – Dewa 19	Advanced	Group 10
Elimination 3 (Sing for Your Life)	10 January 2023	"All I Want" – Kodaline	Advanced	
Showcase (Top 22)	17 January 2023	"Drivers License" – Olivia Rodrigo	Safe	
Final Showcase (Top 17)	23 January 2023	"Asmalibrasi" – Soegi Bornean	Safe	
Road to Spectacular Show (Top 15)	30 January 2023	"Dia Masa Lalumu, Aku Masa Depanmu" – Vionita Sihombing	Safe	
Spekta 1 (Top 14)	6 February 2023	"Lebih dari Egoku" – Mawar de Jongh	Safe	
Spekta 2 (Top 13)	13 February 2023	"Cinta dan Benci" – Geisha	Safe	
Spekta 3 (Top 12)	20 February 2023	"Jangan Gila" – Bunga Citra Lestari	Safe	
Spekta 4 (Top 11)	27 February 2023	"Sakitnya Tuh Di sini" – Cita Citata	Safe	
Spekta 5 (Top 10)	6 March 2023	"Melukis Senja" – Budi Doremi	Safe	
Spekta 6 (Top 9)	13 March 2023	"Secukupnya" – Hindia	Safe	
Spekta 7 (Top 8)	20 March 2023	"Waktu yang Salah" – Fiersa Besari & Thantri Sri Sundari	Safe	Duet withNyoman Paul
Spekta 7 (Top 8)	20 March 2023	"Lovely" – Billie Eilish & Khalid	Safe	
Spekta 8 (Top 7)	27 March 2023	"Hargai Aku" – Armada	Safe	
Spekta 9 (Top 6)	3 April 2023	"Cantik" – Kahitna	Safe	Duet with Nyoman Paul & Rony Parulian
Spekta 9 (Top 6)	3 April 2023	"Aku Wanita" – Reza Artamevia	Safe	Duet with Nyoman Paul & Rony Parulian
Spekta 9 (Top 6)	3 April 2023	"Panah Asmara" – Afgan	Safe	Duet with Nyoman Paul & Rony Parulian
Spekta 9 (Top 6)	3 April 2023	"Cintaku" – Chrisye	Safe	Duet with Nyoman Paul & Rony Parulian
Spekta 9 (Top 6)	3 April 2023	"Runtuh" – Feby Putri & Fiersa Besari	Safe	
Spekta 10 (Top 5)	10 April 2023	"Curi-Curi Pandang" – Naif	Safe	Duet withDavid Bayu
Spekta 10 (Top 5)	10 April 2023	"Jikalau" – Naif	Safe	Duet withDavid Bayu
Spekta 10 (Top 5)	10 April 2023	"Posesif" – Naif	Safe	Duet withDavid Bayu
Spekta 10 (Top 5)	10 April 2023	"Talking to the Moon" – Bruno Mars	Safe	
Spekta 11 (Top 4)	1 May 2023	"Stuck with U" – Justin Bieber & Ariana Grande	Safe	Duet with Nyoman Paul
Spekta 11 (Top 4)	1 May 2023	"Menjadi Dia" – Tiara Andini	Safe	
Road to Grand Final	8 May 2023	"Jodoh Pasti Bertemu" – Afgan	Safe	Duet with Afgan
Road to Grand Final	8 May 2023	"No" – Meghan Trainor	Safe	
Grand Final	15 May 2023	"Merasa Indah" – Tiara Andini	Runner-up	Duet with Tiara Andini
Grand Final	15 May 2023	"Sang Dewi" – Titi DJ	Runner-up	Duet with Lyodra & Salma Salsabil
Grand Final	15 May 2023	"Selir Hati" – T.R.I.A.D	Runner-up	
Grand Final	15 May 2023	"Menghargai Kata Rindu" – Nabila Taqiyyah	Runner-up	
Result & Reunion Show	22 May 2023	"Here's Your Perfect" – Jamie Miller	Runner-up	

Eventually, Nabila reached the pinnacle of her journey on Indonesian Idol and became one of the top finalists. In the grand final round, she finished as a runner-up, losing to Salma Salsabil.

After completing her journey on Indonesian Idol, Nabila signed a contract with the record label Universal Music Indonesia. In addition, Nabila also joined the artist management company Star Media Nusantara, which will support her in developing her music career.

As the winning song of Indonesian Idol, "Menghargai Kata Rindu" became Nabila's debut single released after the signing of her contract. The song was written by Mario G. Klau, a singer-songwriter who was rising in popularity at the time. The song was released in two versions, one of which was performed by Salma Salsabil.

== Discography ==
=== Album Studio ===
List of studio albums with selected details
Title	Album detail	Ref.
Kekal Yang Sementara	Release: 7 March 2025; Number of Tracks: 8; Label: Universal Music Indonesia; Format: CD download, digital download	—N/a

=== Single ===
As a main singer
Title	Year	Highest Chart Position		Album	Ref.
Title	Year	IDN	IDN Songs	Album	Ref.
"Jangan Pergi Lagi"	2020	—	—	Kekal Yang Sementara	
"Penipu Hati" (bersama Cut Dhea)	2020	—	—	Kekal Yang Sementara	
"Move On" (bersama Cut Dhea)	2020	—	—	Kekal Yang Sementara	
"Arti Hidup"	2020	—	—	Kekal Yang Sementara	
"Aku Cinta Kamu"	2021	—	—	Kekal Yang Sementara	
"Shadow" (showing Jefry Zira)	2022	—	—	Kekal Yang Sementara	
"Tak Dianggap"	2022	—	—	Kekal Yang Sementara	
"Menghargai Kata Rindu"	2023	—	—	Kekal Yang Sementara	
"Ku Ingin Pisah"	2023	9	8	Kekal Yang Sementara	
"Hanya Lolongan"	2024	—	—	Kekal Yang Sementara	
"Belum Mulai" (with Insomniacks)	2024	—	—	Kekal Yang Sementara	
"Terpatah Terluka"	2024	—	—	Kekal Yang Sementara	
"Tak Satu Cerita" (with Rizwan Fadillah)	2025	—	—		
"Pengagum Rahasia"	2025	—	—		
"Menikmati Kebohingan"	2025	—	—		
"Salah Sangaka"	2025	—	—		
"Sementara Bukan Selamanya"	2025	—	—		
"Cinta Sia-Sia"	2025	—	—		

== Variety shows ==
=== Digital program ===
- #IdoLyfe (RCTI+, 2023—now) as an MC.

=== Awards and nominations ===
Name of the award event, year of the ceremony, award category, nominee, and nomination result.
Awards	Year (Note: Indicates the year in which the award ceremony was held.)	Category	Nominee	Results	Ref.
Dahsyatnya Awards	2023	Most Outstanding Newcomer	Nabila Taqiyyah	Nominated	
Silet Awards	2023	Most Silet Newcomer	Nabila Taqiyyah	Nominated	
Indonesian Television Awards	2023	Most Popular Television Newcomer	Nabila Taqiyyah	Nominated	
SCTV Music Awards	2024	Most Popular New Newcomer	Nabila Taqiyyah	Won	
Gempak Most Wanted Awards	2024	Most Wanted Music Video 2024	Insomniacks feat Nabila Taqiyyah	Won	
SCTV Music Awards	2025	Most Popular Music Video – "Terpatah Terluka”	Nabila Taqiyyah	Won	
SCTV Music Awards	2025	Most Social Media Singer	Nabila Taqiyyah	Won	

=== Special awards ===
- On 7 July 2021, Nabila received the Silver Creator Award after her YouTube channel reached 100,000 subscribers.

== Notes ==
Preceded by Mark Natama	Indonesian Idol; Runner-up; 2023	Succeeded by Fajar Noor
