= Kau Ilhamku =

2015 promotional single

Promotional single by Yonder Music All-Stars
- Released: 18 November 2015
- Recorded: October 2015; (Kuala Lumpur, Malaysia), (Jakarta, Indonesia), (New York City, United States)
- Genre: Pop, R&B
- Length: 4:52
- Label: Yonder Music, Celcom Axiata
- Songwriters: Asmin Mudin, Joe Flizzow, Sona One, Russell Curtis
- Producers: J-Key, Russell Curtis, Yonder Music (Executive)

Siti Nurhaliza singles chronology
"Mikraj Cinta" (2014)	"Kau Ilhamku" (2015)	"Hari Kemenangan" (2016)

"Kau Ilhamku"^{[note 1]} (Malay: You are My Inspiration) is a promotional single by various Malaysian and Indonesian artists. It serves as an advertising jingle for a collaboration between streaming music service Yonder Music and telecom provider Celcom Axiata, with a view to promoting the former's music streaming service exclusively available on the latter's mobile telecommunication services in Malaysia and Indonesia.

While "Kau Ilhamku" was originally written by Asmin Mudin for Man Bai in 1993, it was reworked by J-Key and Russell Curtis into an R&B and pop rendition after it received the approval from Man Bai himself. Yonder Music's CEO Adam Kidron handpicked the song himself, citing its catchy rhythm and its status with the Malaysian people as an inspirational song as his reasons for doing so.

"Kau Ilhamku" was made available exclusively for streaming on the Yonder Music mobile app on 18 November 2015 alongside its music video on Celcom and Yonder Music's YouTube accounts. On 19 November 2015, the musical composition was first performed live at The Garage KL in Ulu Klang.

== Background and recording ==
"The first time I heard a Malaysian guitar player, Russell Curtis was playing the tune of the song, I immediately fell in love with its music arrangement. To make it more interesting, Yonder Music has managed to gather great Malaysian and Indonesian artists to sing the new version of "Kau Ilhamku" together."

— Adam Kidron during the launch of Yonder Music in Malaysia" (Note: Original:"Pertama kali saya mendengar pemain gitar Malaysia, Russell Curtis memainkan lagu itu, saya terus jatuh cinta pada alunan muziknya. Untuk menjadikan ia lebih menarik, pihak Yonder Music berjaya mengumpul penyanyi-penyanyi hebat dari Malaysia dan Indonesia bagi bergabung suara menyanyikan Kau Ilhamku versi baru.")

"Kau Ilhamku" is a reworked song of the same name that was composed by Asmin Mudin and sung by Man Bai. Man Bai was given the demo of "Kau Ilhamku" by Asmin in 1993, before it was included on his self-titled album in 1995. 20 years later, in September 2015, Man Bai was contacted by Yonder Music, which showed interest in rerecording the song, albeit in a rearranged manner. On the news of rerecording the song, Man Bai commented, "Around two months ago, I was contacted by them [Yonder Music] who appeared interested in reworking "Kau Ilhamku". They like the melody. I agreed [for them to rerecord it] as long as they don't change the original melody of the song. What is more special is that it involves popular local and international artists." (Note: Original:"Saya dihubungi pihak mereka yang berminat untuk memberi nafas baharu kepada lagu Kau Ilhamku sekitar dua bulan lalu. Pihak mereka sukakan melodi ini. Seterusnya saya bersetuju selagi mereka tidak menukar melodi asal lagu ini. Lebih istimewa ia turut membabitkan artis popular tanah air dan luar negara.") Man Bai later recorded his vocals for the new version of "Kau Ilhamku" in October 2015. Siti Nurhaliza, another artist involved in the creation of the new song, also revealed that she had finished recording her part in the same month. She commented, "When everything was agreed upon, we did my parts in October. Originally I sang the song in its entirety with the new music arrangement. But in the end, the parts [of the song] where I would sing [that were included in the final version] were decided by the producers." (Note: Original:"Apabila semua dipersetujui, rakaman bahagian Siti dilakukan pada bulan Oktober. Asalnya Siti menyanyikan keseluruhan lagu Kau Ilhamku dengan susunan muzik baharu. Tetapi ia akhirnya bahagian mana yang membabitkan Siti melagukan lagu berkenaan ditentukan pihak penerbit.") Over the course of the months, the new version of "Kau Ilhamku" was recorded and produced in various cities and countries including Kuala Lumpur, Jakarta, and New York City.

It was also agreed upon that proceeds from the musical single would be transferred to Yonder Music Trust, a non-profit trust which main interest is to help music education organizations as well as providing help for groups of people in need. The artistes who were involved in this project have also donated RM 300 000 to the fund.

== Composition and lyrics ==
Originally written in Bahasa Malaysia, the reworked song ended up being four minutes and fifty two seconds long, with its genre holding the middle between pop and R&B. Some rap verses in English were also included. Produced by J-Key and Russell Curtis, "Kau Ilhamku" was handpicked by Adam Kidron, Yonder Music's CEO. Kidron thought highly of the song's catchy rhythm, as well as its popularity amongst Malaysians as an inspirational song.

== Release and promotion ==
On 18 November 2015, the "Kau Ilhamku" was made available to stream exclusively on the Yonder Music mobile app for Celcom subscribers. Celcom's and Yonder Music's official YouTube accounts released the accompanying music video the same day.

== Critical response ==
A reviewer from Malaysian Digest gave the song a mixed review. The reviewer commented, "Having top singers singing a hit song in a collaborative effort is a plus point, but on the other hand, breaking it down with a bridge in English and rap, may have just taken away the sweet and simple sound of an already beautiful tune."

== Music video ==
=== Background and release ===
Shot and recorded by Sean Jesudasan, Anusha Peterson, and Shaun Ng in various locations and recording studios, the music video was released on both Yonder Music and Celcom's official YouTube accounts on 18 November 2015, to coincide with the release of the song for streaming purposes on the Yonder mobile app, exclusively available to Celcom subscribers.

=== Synopsis ===
The music video begins with an animated introduction of an abstract object that morphs into several forms including a mouth with musical notes and a spinning vinyl record. The first singer to appear was Man Bai. It was followed by Yuna, Cita Citata, Afgansyah Reza, Elizabeth Tan, Siti Nurhaliza, Ariel Noah, Natasha Ines, Jaclyn Victor, Joe Flizzow, SonaOne, and Russell Curtis.

Throughout the video, various bright-colored animations and shots are shown, layering over videos of the artists who are singing the song in their respective recording studios. There are also certain parts of the video where the vocals and videos are merged into the same frame. Throughout the duration of the video, several artists appear frequently, whereas others do not, depending on how much lines to sing they have in the song.

=== Reception ===
As of January 2016, the music video uploaded to Yonder Music's official YouTube account has received more than 200.000 views and generated over a thousand likes.

== Live performance ==
The new version of "Kau Ilhamku" was first performed live during the press conference and launch of Yonder Music mobile app in Malaysia on 19 November 2015 at The Garage KL in Ulu Klang. All artists who were featured on the track were there for the live performance of the song except for Cita Citata and Yuna.

== Artists involved ==
- Afgansyah Reza
- Ariel Noah
- Cita Citata
- Elizabeth Tan
- Jaclyn Victor
- Joe Flizzow
- Man Bai
- Natasha Ines
- Siti Nurhaliza
- SonaOne
- Yuna

== Footnote ==
- Note 1: It is also sometimes spelled as "Kau Ilham Ku", which has the same meaning.
