= 2nd Indonesian Choice Awards =

2015 entertainment awards ceremony in Indonesia

- Date: 24 May 2015
- Location: Indonesia Convention Exhibition, South Tangerang, Banten
- Hosted by: Sarah Sechan; David Bayu Danangjaya

Highlights
- Most awards: Sheila on 7 (3)
- Most nominations: Kunto Aji (3); Sheila on 7 (3); Trio Lestari (3); Yura Yunita (3)

Television/radio coverage
- Network: NET.

The 2nd Indonesian Choice Awards (Official name: NET. 2.0 presents Indonesian Choice Awards 2015) was an entertainment industry award ceremony held on 24 May 2015, at the Indonesia Convention Exhibition in South Tangerang, Banten. The show was hosted by Sarah Sechan and David Bayu Danangjaya.

Awards were presented in 11 categories, including a new category, "Digital Persona of the Year". The awards ceremony aired live on NET. during their second birthday celebration, entitled NET 2.0.

Sheila on 7 was the biggest winner of the night, with three awards for "Band/Group/Duo of the Year", "Album of the Year" for Musim Yang Baik, and "Song of the Year" for "Lapang Dada". Other winners included Judika, who won "Male Singer of the Year", Maudy Ayunda, who won "Female Singer of the Year", Kunto Aji, who won "Breakthrough of the Year", etc.

The conductor, Addie MS, receiving the special award "Lifetime Achievement of the Year" for has been brought good name of Indonesia through music was brought by him.

== Voting system ==
Voting for the 2014 Indonesian Choice Awards began on 1 May 2015. Members of the public could cast their votes via Twitter or Facebook.

== Performances ==
| Artist(s) | Song(s) |
Main show
| Agnez Mo | "Coke Bottle" |
| Karmin | "Brokenhearted" |
| Iwan Fals | "Pesawat Tempur" |
| Demi Lovato | "Let It Go" |
| Agnez Mo; Chloe X | "Temperature" "Matahariku" "Shut Em Up" "Vroom Vroom" |
| Bunga Citra Lestari | "Shake It Off" |
| Iwan Fals | "Bongkar" |
| Demi Lovato | "Give Your Heart A Break" "Heart Attack" "Neon Lights" |
| Sheila on 7 | "Dan" "Seberapa Pantas" "Jadikan Aku Pacarmu" "Lapang Dada" |
| Agnez Mo | Agnez Mo mash up "Ku T'lah Jatuh Cinta" "Tak Ada Logika" |
| RAN; Kunto Aji | "Dekat Dihati" "Terlalu Lama Sendiri" |
| Tulus | "Jangan Cintai Aku Apa Adanya" |
| Karmin | "Acapella" |
| Armand Maulana | "Masalembo" |
| Nidji | Nidji medley "Heaven" "Laskar Pelangi" "Diatas Awan" |
| Karmin | "Super Bass" |
| Vidi Aldiano; Elizabeth Tan | "Gadis Genit" "Could It Be" |
| Stereo Cast | "Dengar Bisikku" "Uptown Funk" |
| Armand Maulana | Indonesian Diva's medley song "Astaga" "Burung Camar" "Ekspresi" "Mahadaya Cinta" |
| Karmin | "Hello" |

Non-song performances

| Artist(s) | Perform |
Main show
| Sule; Andre Taulany; Indro Warkop | Ini Talkshow The Musical |
| Simon Pierro | Digital Magic Performance |

== Presenters ==
- Sule and Andre Taulany – Presented Male Singer of the Year
- Dwi Sasono and Armand Maulana – Presented Song of the Year
- Dian Sastrowardoyo and Vincent Rompies – Presented Band/Group/Duo of the Year
- Deva Mahenra and Laudya Cynthia Bella – Presented Album of the Year
- Danang & Darto – Presented Digital Persona of the Year
- Boy William and Chelsea Islan – Presented Breakthrough Artist of the Year
- Tanta Ginting and Marissa Anita – Presented Female Singer of the Year
- Tara Basro and Tatjana Saphira – Presented Actor of the Year
- Desta and Shahnaz Soehartono – Presented Actress of the Year
- Ray Sahetapy and Pevita Pearce – Presented Movie of the Year
- Lukman Sardi and Gista Putri – Presented TV Program of the Year
- Ir. Rudiantara, MBA – Presented Lifetime Achievement of the Year

== Winners and nominees ==
The full list of nominees and winners are as follows:

=== Music ===
| Song of the Year | Album of the Year |
|---|---|
| "Lapang Dada", Sheila on 7; "Terlalu Lama Sendiri", Kunto Aji; "Cinta dan Rahasia", Yura Yunita featuring Glenn Fredly; "Gelora Cinta", Trio Lestari; "Gagal Bersembunyi", The Rain | Musim Yang Baik, Sheila on 7; Musik Pop, Maliq & D'Essentials; Album 1 Part 2, Matajiwa; Wangi, Trio Lestari; Live At Abbey, Gigi |
| Male Singer of the Year | Female Singer of the Year |
| Judika; Kunto Aji; Virzha; Ipang Lazuardi; Teza Sumendra | Maudy Ayunda; Rini Wulandari; Andien; Isyana Sarasvati; Yura Yunita |
| Band/Group/Duo of the Year | Breakthrough Artist of the Year |
| Sheila on 7; Slank; Trio Lestari; Endank Soekamti; Matajiwa | Kunto Aji; Neurotic; Art of Tree; Yura Yunita; Isyana Sarasvati |

=== Movie ===
Movie of the Year
Marmut Merah Jambu; Tenggelamnya Kapal Van Der Wijck; Soekarno; 99 Cahaya di Langit Eropa; Di Balik 98
| Actor of the Year | Actress of the Year |
| Vino G. Bastian; Reza Rahadian; Herjunot Ali; Nicholas Saputra; Raditya Dika | Chelsea Islan; Dian Sastrowardoyo; Acha Septriasa; Pevita Pearce; Laudya Cynthia Bella |

=== Television ===
TV Program of the Year
- Mario Teguh Golden Ways
  - Hitam Putih
  - Kick Andy
  - Mata Najwa
  - Indonesia Lawak Klub

=== Other ===
Digital Personal of the Year
- Raditya Dika
  - Najwa Shihab
  - Vidi Aldiano
  - Darius Sinathriya
  - Pandji Pragiwaksono

Special award

Lifetime Achievement Award
- Addie MS
