= 18th Annual Anugerah Musik Indonesia =

Annual Anugerah Musik Indonesia
- Date: September 22, 2015
- Location: Ecovention, Pademangan, North Jakarta
- Country: Indonesia
- Hosted by: Arie Untung
- Most awards: Tulus (6)
- Most nominations: Tulus (9)

Television/radio coverage
- Network: RCTI
- Runtime: 180 minutes

The 18th Annual Anugerah Musik Indonesia was held on September 22, 2015, at the Ecovention in Pademangan, North Jakarta. The show was broadcast live on RCTI and was hosted by Arie Untung.

The show was a collaboration between Anugerah Musik Indonesia Foundation and RCTI. The theme of the show was Stop Pembajakan! (stop piracy). Musicians, singers, and composers were nominated for 53 different awards. The event was divided into three segments: AMI Awards Gala Night, Lifetime Achievement Awards, and The Winner's Concert.

Tulus led the nominations with nine, and also became the biggest winner of the night with six wins, including Best of the Best Album for Gajah, Best of the Best Production Work for "Jangan Cintai Aku Apa Adanya", and Best Pop Male Solo Artist. Other winners included Cita Citata and Trio Lestari, who won three awards. Sheila On 7, Isyana Sarasvati, Andien, Kotak, etc. took home two trophies each.

Bob Tutupoli received the "AMI Legend Award" for his body of work through his career.

== Performances ==
Artist(s)	Song(s)
Main show
Sheila On 7	"Lapang Dada" "Seberapa Pantas"
Ayu Ting Ting; Zaskia Gotik	"Yang Sudah Ya Sudahlah" "Satu Jam Saja"
Repvblik; Indah Nevertari	"Selimut Tetangga"
Elvy Sukaesih; Husein	"Gadis Atau Janda"
HiVi!	"Siapkah Kau Tuk Jatuh Cinta Lagi"
Yura Yunita	"Cinta Dan Rahasia"
Isyana Sarasvati	"Tetap Dalam Jiwa"
Kunto Aji; Intan Soekotjo	"Terlalu Lama Sendiri"
Krisdayanti; Mulan Jameela	"Antara Benci Dan Rindu" "Jangan Sakiti Hatinya"
Fatin Shidqia	"Dia Dia Dia"
Payung Teduh	"Untuk Perempuan Yang Sedang Dalam Pelukan"
Kotak; Atiek CB	"Maafkan" "Selalu Cinta" "Terserah Boy"
JKT48	"Papan Penanda Isi Hati"
Julia Perez; Duo Serigala	"Merana"
Kunto Aji; Isyana Sarasvati; Yura Yunita	"Widuri"
Bebi Romeo; Ahmad Dhani; Isyana Sarasvati	"Ku Cinta Kau Dan Dia"

== Presenters ==
- Fatin Shidqia and Indah Nevertari — Presented Best of the Best Newcomer
- Melody JKT48, Ve JKT48 and Haruka JKT48 — Presented Best Children Female Solo Artist
- GAC — Presented Best Soul/R&B Male/Female Solo Artist
- Ahmad Dhani and Mulan Jameela — Presented Best of the Best Production Work
- Sheila On 7 — Presented Best Pop Vocal Group
- Krisdayanti — Presented Best Contemporary Dangdut Female Solo Artist
- Virzha and Ikang Fauzi — Presented Best Rock Duo/Group
- Tantowi Yahya — Presented Legend Awards
- Zaskia Gotik, Julia Perez and Ayu Ting Ting — Presented Best Dance/Electronic Production Work
- Nidji — Presented Best of the Best Album
- Bebi Romeo and Elvy Sukaesih — Presented Best Pop Female Solo Artist

== Nominees and winners ==
The nominees were announced on September 11, 2015. Winners are listed first and highlighted in boldface.

=== Pop ===
**Best Pop Female Solo Artist**: **Andien – "Siapa"**; Bunga Citra Lestari – "Kuasa-Mu"; Fatin Shidqia – "Demi Cintaku"; Krisdayanti – "Surga Yang Tak Dirindukan"; Maudy Ayunda – "Bayangkan Rasakan"; Rossa – "Hijrah Cinta"	**Best Pop Male Solo Artist**: **Tulus – "Jangan Cintai Aku Apa Adanya"**; Afgan – "Kumohon"; Anji – "Jerawat Rindu"; Judika – "Apakah Ini Cinta"; Virzha – "Aku Lelakimu"
**Best Pop Duo/Group**: **Noah – "Hero"**; 3Composers – "Masih Ada"; Repvblik – "Selimut Tetangga"; Maliq & D'Essentials – "Himalaya"; Sheila On 7 – "Lapang Dada"	**Best Pop Collaboration**: **Rossa (featuring Afgan) – "Kamu Yang Kutunggu"**; Andien (featuring Marcell) – "Sempurnalah Cinta"; Element (featuring Inul Daratista) – "Maaf Dari Surga"; Maliq & D'Essentials (featuring Fariz RM) – "Barcelona"; Maudy Ayunda (featuring David Choi) – "By My Side"; Sammy Simorangkir (featuring Dian Pramana Poetra) – "Kau Seputih Melati"
**Best Pop Vocal Group**: **JKT48 – "Papan Penanda Isi Hati"**; Blink – "Bahagia Setengah Mati"; Cherrybelle – "Malam Minggu"; CJR – "Lebih Baik"; GAC – "Seberapa Pantas"	**Best Pop Songwriter**: **Tulus – "Jangan Cintai Aku Apa Adanya" (performed by Tulus)**; Tulus – "Gajah" (performed by Tulus); Widi Puradireja, Arya Aditya, Ilman Ibrahim Isa and Java Finger – "Himalaya" (performed by Maliq & D'Essentials); Rizal Armada and Radha Armada – "Pergi Pagi Pulang Pagi" (performed by Armada); Ruri Repvblik – "Selimut Tetangga" (performed by Repvblik); Dewi Lestari and Ariel – "Seperti Kemarin" (performed by Noah)
**Best Pop Recording Producer**: **Andi Rianto – "Kau Seputih Melati" (performed by Sammy Simorangkir (featuring Dian Pramana Poetra))**; Tulus – "Gajah" (performed by Tulus); Steve Lilywhite – "Hero" (performed by Noah); Eross Candra – "Lapang Dada" (performed by Sheila On 7); Repvblik – "Selimut Tetangga" (performed by Repvblik); Melly Goeslaw and Anto Hoed – "Surga Yang Tak Dirindukan" (performed by Krisdayanti)	**Best Pop Album**: **Gajah – Tulus**; Love, Life & Music – Rossa; Moments – Maudy Ayunda; Musim Yang Baik – Sheila On 7; Second Chance – Noah

=== Rock ===
**Best Rock Solo Artist**: **Bondan Prakoso – "Generasiku"**; Abdee Negara – "Where Are You Mr. President"; Baruna – "Rasa"; Denny Chasmala – "Selamat Jalan Biji Kedondong"; Ipunk Power Metal – "Inspiration"	**Best Rock Duo/Group**: **Kotak – "Satu Indonesia"**; /rif – "Turn Off The Light"; Boomerang – "Tetapkanlah Hatimu"; Gigi – "Tak Lagi Percaya"; Slank – "Slank Gak Ada Matinya"
**Best Rock Album**: **Never Dies – Kotak**; Generasiku – Bondan Prakoso; Rebirth: New Beginning – Killing Me Inside; Slank Gak Ada Matinya – Slank; Song Book I – Ian Antono; Street Funk – Funky Kopral

=== Jazz/Instrumental ===
**Best Jazz Instrumental Performers**: **Benny Likumahuwa Jazz Connection – "Jack & Bubi"**; Indro Hardjodikoro – "Foogie Night"; Ricad Hutapea – "Jalan Pertama"; Tesla Manaf (featuring Mahagotra Ganesha) – "Part 4"; Tjut Nyak Deviana – "Ayo Mama"	**Best Vocal Jazz Performers**: **Syaharani & QueenFireworks – "Merah Jingga Kuning"**; Dian Kusuma – "Kutau Ada Sesuatu"; Elvyn G Masassya (featuring Dany Java Jive) – "Selamanya"; Nita Sinaga – "Nothing Personal"; Tjut Nyak Deviana (featuring Tompi) – "Anging Mamiri"
**Best Jazz Album**: **Selalu Ada Cinta – Syaharani & QueenFireworks**; It's All Yours – Tesla Manaf; Piano Duet Guitar – Riza Arshad and Robert MR; Rekam Jejak Volume 1 – Benny Likumahuwa Jazz Connection; Tales of Indonesia – Tjut Nyak Deviana

=== Soul/R&B ===
**Best Soul/R&B Male/Female Solo Artist**: **Isyana Sarasvati – "Keep Being You"**; Glenn Fredly – "Perempuanku"; Rini Wulandari – "Oh Baby"; Teza Sumendra – "I Want You, Love"; Tulus – "Baru"; Vidi Aldiano – "Membiasakan Cinta"	**Best Soul/R&B Group/Vocal Group**: **Trio Lestari – "Gelora Cintaku"**; Chaseiro – "Nada 2 G"; GAC – "Bahagia"; Glenn Fredly (featuring Monita Tahalea & Is Payung Teduh) – "Filosofi & Logika"; Soulvibe – "Tak Bisa Menunggu"; Syaharani & QueenFireworks – "Save Me Sometime"
**Best Soul/R&B Album**: **Wangi – Trio Lestari**; Dance With Me – Syaharani; Independent Part 1 – Rini Wulandari; Stronger – GAC; Max5imum – Max5; Yura – Yura Yunita

=== Kroncong/Style/Opera ===
**Best Kroncong/Style/Opera Duo/Group Male/Female Solo Artist**: **Waldjinah (featuring Nuning & Asty Dewi) – "Ayo Ngguyu"**; Dian Mita – "Nuansa Kebangsaan"; Mamiek Prasitoresmi – "Keroncong Irama Malam"; Tetty Supangat – "Gambang Semarang"; Tuti Maryati – "Keroncong Hanya Satu"	**Best Kroncong/Style/Stambul Song**: **"Keroncong Goyang" – TTM**; "Keroncong Gelisahku" – Tetty Supangat; "Keroncong Irama Malam" – Mamiek Prasitoresmi; "Keroncong Tanah Papua" – Aulia Qirya Rais; "Nuansa Kebangsaan" – Dian Mita
**Best Kroncong/Style/Opera Recording Producer**: **OK Bintang Surakarta – "Ayo Ngguyu" (performed by Waldjinah, Nuning and Asty)**; Koko Thole – "Keroncong Goyang" (performed by TTM); J Sarwono, Koko Thole and Harry Yamba – "Keroncong Gita Jiwa Nusantara" (performed by Tuti Maryati); Harry Yamba, Kunt Pranasmara and Arfetya Wulan Romadhona – "Keroncong Tanah Papua" (performed by Aulia Qirya Rais); J Sarwono, Koko Thole, Hary Yamba and Kunt Pranasmara – "Lenggang Surabaya" (performed by Mamiek Marsudi); Kate Wayah Sidiq – "Nuansa Kebangsaan" (performed by Dian Mita)

=== Contemporary Dangdut/Dangdut ===
**Best Dangdut Female Solo Artist**: **Ikke Nurjanah – "Tentang Rasa"**; Cici Paramida – "Masih Ada Yang Mencintaimu"; Elvy Sukaesih – "Seujung Kuku"; Evie Tamala – "Duniapun Tersenyum"; Rita Sugiarto – "Oleh Oleh"; Yunita Ababil – "Dua Pilihan"	**Best Contemporary Dangdut Female Solo Artist**: **Cita Citata – "Sakitnya Tuh Disini"**; Ayu Ting Ting – "Geboy Mujair"; Chika – "Kecup Sayang"; Julia Perez – "Aku Mah Gitu Orangnya"; Soimah – "Pelet Cinta"; Zaskia Gotik – "Hey Mas Bro"
**Best Dangdut Male Solo Artist**: **Mansyur S – "Selamat Datang Harapan"**; Endang Kurnia – "Budaya Kehancuran"; Hamdan ATT – "Bom Waktu"; Irwan D'Academy 2 – "Benang Biru"; Yus Yunus – "Jakarta Lampung"	**Best Contemporary Dangdut Male Solo Artist**: **Hamdan ATT – "Ilusi Cinta"**; Amriz Arifin – "Madu"; Beniqno Aquino – "Surat Undangan"; Nassar – "Kecanduan Kamu"; Saipul Jamil – "Ratu Hatiku"
**Best Dangdut Duo, Group/Collaboration**: **Ayu Soraya (featuring Novi Ayla, Jacky Hasan and David F) – "Budaya"**; Adibal G4UL (featuring Ali KDI and Aam KDI) – "Asli Indonesia"; Danang D'Academy 2 (featuring Endah D'Academy 2) – "Gadis atau Janda"; Dewi Amour – "Cinta Sexy"; D'Mojang – "I Love You"	**Best Contemporary Dangdut Duo, Group/Collaboration**: **Manis Manja Group – "Rela"**; Srigala – "Selebritis Narsis"; Duo Serigala – "Abang Goda"; G4UL – "Kalau Aku Kaya"; Gebby Pareira (featuring Ratna Anjani and Evie Zubay) – "Panen Raya"; Trio Macan – "Buka Sitik Joss"
**Best Contemporary Dangdut/Dangdut Songwriter**: **Tjahjadi Djajanata and Ishak – "Sakitnya Tuh Disini" (performed by Cita Citata)**; Tjahjadi Djajanata and Ishak – "Bang Jali" (performed by Linda Moy); Dadan Indriana – "Geboy Mujair" (performed by Ayu Ting Ting); Nanang Suwito – "Oleh Oleh" (performed by Rita Sugiarto); H. Ukat – "Seujung Kuku" (performed by Elvy Sukaesih)	**Best Contemporary Dangdut/Dangdut Recording Producer**: **Tjahjadi Djajanata – "Sakitnya Tuh Disini" (performed by Cita Citata)**; Prie Key – "Aku Takkan Pergi" (performed by Sharifa); Mara Karma – "Asli Indonesia" (performed by Adibal G4UL (featuring Ali KDI and Aam KDI)); H. Ukat S – "Aya Aya Wae" (performed by Risma); Supri – "Bawalah Aku" (performed by Erie Suzan); Gina and Gita Youbi – "Hei Siapa Kamu" (performed by 2 Racun Youbi Sister); Alik Ababil – "Oleh Oleh" (performed by Rita Sugiarto); Yoggy P – "Sengaja SLI" (performed by Gadis Mandasari)
**Best Contemporary Dangdut/Dangdut Album**: **Best Hamdan ATT & Monata – Hamdan ATT**; 2 Racun – 2 Racun Youbi Sister; I.P.K – Dewi Gayatri; Irma Darmawangsa – Irma Darmawangsa; Ratna Listy – Ratna Listy

=== Children ===
**Best Children Female Solo Artist**: **Romaria – "Malu Sama Kucing"**; Amira – "Teman Aku"; Embun Tabina – "Menanti Matahari"; Leoni Paramitha – "Kupu Kupu"; RR Ayu Savitha – "Strawberry"	**Best Children Male Solo Artist**: **Tegar – "Tak Boleh Sombong"**; Ali Fikri – "Sepohon Kayu"; Asyari Afif – "Tuhan"; Brandon – "The Power of Dream"; Kevin Kahuni – "Si Pangeran Kecil"
**Best Children Duo/Group**: **Barbie Angel – "Ayah Terhebat"**; 4U Band – "Merah Putih"; All Stars – "Bahasaku Bahasa Indonesia"; Jarkidz – "Kau Bagaikan Pangeran"; Nation Beat – "Hebatnya Persahabatan"	**Best Children Songwriter**: **Julia R. Tampubolon – "Bahasaku Bahasa Indonesia" (performed by ACILA (Ajang Cipta Lagu Anak))**; Ahmad Riznanto – "Doa" (performed by Sasha Q); Rian D'Masiv – "Jadi Matahari" (performed by Kirana (La Academia Junior Indonesia)); Alma Raihannah – "Kupu kupu" (performed by Leoni Paramitha); Aries – "Merah Putih" (performed by 4U Band)
**Best Children Recording Producer**: **Erwin Gutawa – "Tuhan" (performed by Asyari Afif)**; Alfa Dwi Agustiar – "Bahasaku Bahasa Indonesia" (performed by ACILA (Ajang Cipta Lagu Anak)); Uky Ariandi – "Bintang Untuk Mama" (performed by Kanaya Riffa Azzahra); Ahmad Riznanto – "Doa" (performed by Sasha Q); Harry Budiman – "Hebatnya Persahabatan" (performed by Nation Beat); Ivan – "Malu Sama Kucing" (performed by Romaria)	**Best Children Album**: **Dongeng – Adyla Rafa Naura, Nola Be3 and Mhala Numata**; Hidup ini Indah – Sasha Q; Kau Bagaikan Pangeran – Jarkidz; Mengejar Bintang – Barbie Angel; The Power of Dream – 4U Band

=== Production Work ===
**Best Alternative Production Work**: **Endank Soekamti (featuring Kemal Pahlevi) – "Luar Biasa"**; Aksan Sjuman and The Committee of the Fest – "Love as a Punishment"; Danilla Riyadi – "Ada Di Sana"; Float Project – "Kesana"; Leo Kristi – "Gulagalugu Suara Nelayan"	**Best Urban Production Work**: **Maliq & D'Essentials – "Aurora"**; Art of Tree – "Gibberish"; Adila Fitri – "Woles"; Loose Loud Whiz – "Ups n Downs"; Maliq & D'Essentials (featuring Indra Lesmana) – "Ananda"; Soul of Magnolia (featuring Rosalia Putri) – "Kamu"; Fu2ristic – "Selamat Pagi"
**Best Metal Production Work**: **Agung Hellfrog – "Revelation Dreams"**; Lord Symphony – "Earth Beneath The Sky"; Soul Are – "Agresi"; Thrashline – "Kontrol Sosial"; Vision Eyes – "Manifesto"	**Best Progressive Rock Production Work**: **Iwan Hasan (featuring Rick Wakeman, Keenan Nasution, Marcell, Indra Lesmana, Levty Progre) – "Indonesia Maharddhika"**; Dewa Budjana – "Duaji & Guruji"; I Know You Well Miss Clara (IKYWMC) – "A Dancing Girl from The Planet Marsavish"; The Kadri Jimmo (featuring Once Mekel, Addie MS and City of Prague Philharmonic Orchestra) – "Srikandi"; Tohpati (featuring Jimmy Haslip, Chad Wackerman) – "Rahwana"
**Best Rap/Hip-Hop Production Work**: **JFlow – "We Are One Part II"**; Lady Gan – "Aku Cinta Indonesia"; Rini Wulandari – "Independent Girl"; Saykoji (featuring Jaydee Soul ID) – "Shadows My Heart"; Soul ID – "Go Low"	**Best Reggae/Ska/Rock Steady Production Work**: **Souljah – "Jatah Mantan"**; Chaseiro (featuring Tompi) – "Kulama Menanti"; Gangstarasta – "Reggae Disco"; JFlow (featuring Nath The Lions) – "Slank Me"; Viky Sianipar (featuring Ras Muhamad and Alsant Nababan) – "Pulo Samosir"
**Best Dance/Electronic Production Work**: **Nidji – "Secepat Kilat"**; Citra Scholastika – "Kurnia dan Pesona"; Indah Dewi Pertiwi (featuring Richard Schrijver) – "Semua Jadi Satu"; Shae – "Aku Suka Kamu"; Syahrini – "Cetarrrrr"; Winky Wiryawan – "Everything"	**Best Collaboration Production Work**: **Sammy Simorangkir (featuring Dian Pramana Poetra) – "Kau Seputih Melati"**; 3Composers (featuring Kevin Aprilio) – "Bagiku Cinta"; Armand Maulana & Dewi Gita – "Seperti Legenda"; Bayu Risa (featuring Iwa K, Ras Muhamad and Joseph Saryuf) – "Changes"; Rossa (featuring Afgan) – "Kamu Yang Kutunggu"
**Best Original Soundtrack Film Production Work**: **Andien – "Let It Be My Way" (Original soundtrack: Hijab)**; Andien (featuring Marcell) – "Sempurnalah Cinta" (Original soundtrack: Merry Riana: Mimpi Sejuta Dolar); Kotak – "Jagalah Bumi" (Original soundtrack: BoBoiBoy); Krisdayanti – "Surga Yang Tak Dirindukan" (Original soundtrack: Surga Yang Tak Dirindukan); Maliq & D'Essentials – "Semesta" (Original soundtrack: Filosofi Kopi); Rossa – "Syukur" (Original soundtrack: Soekarno)	**Best Vocal Group Production Work**: **Trio Lestari – "Gelora Cintaku"**; Blink – "Seindah Biasa"; Cherrybelle – "Malam Minggu"; CJR – "Lebih Baik"; GAC – "Bahagia"; JKT48 – "Papan Penanda Isi Hati"
**Best Speaking Region Production Work**: **Viky Sianipar (featuring Ras Muhamad and Alsant Nababan) – "Pulo Samosir"**; Tjut Nyak Deviana (featuring Tompi) – "Angin Mamiri"; Diah Ayu Lestari (featuring Jalu Pratidina) – "Manuk Dadali"; Didi Kempot – "Tresno Sewengi"; Ungu – "Baku Jaga"; Victor Hutabarat – "Jamila"	**Best Instrumental Production Work**: **Tohpati – "Guitar Fantasy"**; Benny Likumahuwa Jazz Connection – "Jack & Bubi"; Dewa Budjana – "Saniscara"; Indro Hardjodikoro – "Foogie Night"; Ipunk Power Metal – "Inspiration"; Victor Hutabarat – "Jamila"; Tjut Nyak Deviana – "Ayo Mama"

=== Field Production Support ===
**Best Recording Album Producer**: **Sheila On 7/Sony Music Indonesia – Musim Yang Baik (released by Sheila On 7)**; Gita Gutawa/Sony Music Indonesia – The Next Chapter (released by Gita Gutawa); Pongki Barata/Music Factory Indonesia – Pongki Barata Meets The Stars (released by Pongki Barata); Steve Lilywhite/Musica Studios – Second Chance (released by Noah); Yonathan Nugroho/Trinity Optima Production – Love, Life & Music (released by Rossa); Yonathan Nugroho/Trinity Optima Production – Moments (released by Maudy Ayunda)	**Best Graphic Design Album**: **Farid Stevy Asta – Musim Yang Baik (released by Sheila On 7)**; Wok The Rock – Happy Coda (released by Frau); Vicky Tanzil and Petty Hartanto – Stronger (released by GAC); Kendra Ahimsa – The Many Failings of Bugsy Moonblood (released by Marsh Kids); Indro Moektiono – The Origin of Non Entity (released by Marché La Void)
**Best Mix Engineer**: **Ari 'Aru' Renaldi – "1000 Tahun Lamanya" (performed by Tulus)**; Ari 'Aru' Renaldi – "Bayangkan Rasakan" (performed by Maudy Ayunda); Deny Surya – "Daima" (performed by Ayu Laksmi); Yosua Simanju and Kemal – "Pulo Samosir" (performed by Viky Sianipar (featuring Ras Muhamad and Alsant Nababan)); Widi Puradiredja – "Semesta" (performed by Maliq & D'Essentials)

=== General ===
**Best of the Best Album**: **Gajah – Tulus**; Moments – Maudy Ayunda; Musik Pop – Maliq & D'Essentials; Musim Yang Baik – Sheila On 7; Second Chance – Noah; Stronger – GAC	**Best of the Best Newcomer**: **Isyana Sarasvati – "Tetap Dalam Jiwa"**; Al Ghazali – "Kurayu Bidadari"; Cita Citata – "Sakitnya Tuh Disini"; Kirana (La Academia junior Indonesia) – "Jadi Matahari"; Kunto Aji – "Terlalu Lama Sendiri"; Rizki & Ridho D'Academy 2 – "Kembalilah Padaku"; Virzha – "Aku Lelakimu"
**Best of the Best Production Work**: **"Jangan Cintai Aku Apa Adanya" – Tulus**; "Sakitnya Tuh Disini" – Cita Citata; "Kamu Yang Kutunggu" – Rossa (featuring Afgan); "Kau Seputih Melati" – Sammy Simorangkir (featuring Dian Pramana Poetra); "Aku Lelakimu" – Virzha

AMI Legend Awards
**Bob Tutupoli**

== Artist with most nominations and awards ==
The following artist received most nominations:

Nominations	Artist
9	Tulus
8	Maliq & D'Essentials
7	Rossa
6	Sheila On 7
6	Noah
6	GAC
6	Maudy Ayunda
5	Cita Citata
5	Tjut Nyak Deviana
4	Afgan
4	Dian Pramana Poetra
4	Ras Muhamad
4	Sammy Simorangkir

The following artist received most awards:

Awards	Artist
6	Tulus
3	Cita Citata
3	Trio Lestari
2	Sheila On 7
2	Isyana Sarasvati
2	Andien
2	Kotak
2	Waldjinah
2	Hamdan ATT
2	Sammy Simorangkir
2	Dian Pramana Poetra
2	Syaharani & QueenFireworks
