= Musim Yang Baik =

Studio album by Sheila on 7
- Released: December 10, 2014
- Genre: Pop
- Length: 36:38
- Label: Sony Music Entertainment Indonesia
- Producer: Sheila On 7

Sheila on 7 chronology
'Anugerah Terindah dari Sheila on 7' (2014)	Musim Yang Baik (2014)

Singles from Musim Yang Baik
- 1. "Lapang Dada" Released: 8 November 2014

Musim Yang Baik is the eighth studio album by Indonesian pop group, Sheila On 7. The album was released on December 10, 2014, by Sony Music Entertainment Indonesia. The main song on the album is "Lapang Dada". The album contains 10 title song which all new, except Brian (Drummer). All personnel of Sheila on 7 contributed in the portion of the same song on the album. Eross the guitarist remains as the most contributor song with 4 songs while Adam and Duta each contributed 3 songs.

The album won three awards: "Best Recording Album Producer" and "Best Graphic Design Album" and nominated for "Best Pop Album" and "Best of the Best Album" at the 2015 Anugerah Musik Indonesia, won "Album of the Year" award at the 2nd Indonesian Choice Awards and also won "The Best Album" award at 2015 Hai Reader's Poll Music Awards.

== Background ==
After being hit by uncertainty, the album Musim Yang Baik finally officially released December 10, 2014, is the eighth album while the final album of Sheila On 7 together with Sony Music Entertainment Indonesia. On this album, Duta try to dispel their boredom to bring something different, as is known except for the first album, all albums that have been released recorded using digital technology, then this album, Sheila On 7 trying to get back to the analog era. On their next album will reportedly be a career in the indie label.

== Track listing ==
No.	Title	Writer(s)	Length
1.	"Selamat Datang"	Eross Candra	3:46
2.	"Satu Langkah"	Adam Muhammad Subarkah	3:18
3.	"Buka Mata Dan Telinga"	Akhidyat Duta Modjo	4:14
4.	"Canggung"	Eross Candra	3:43
5.	"My Lovely"	Adam Muhammad Subarkah	3:47
6.	"Beruntungnya Aku"	Akhdiyat Duta Modjo	4:19
7.	"Lapang Dada"	Eross Candra	3:18
8.	"Belum"	Akhdiyat Duta Modjo	3:50
9.	"Musim Yang Baik"	Eross Chandra	4:41
10.	"Sampai Jumpa"	Adam Muhammad Subarkah	3:42 NJ
Total length:			36:38

wagon

== Awards and nominations ==
Year	Awards	Category	Result
2015	Indonesian Choice Awards	Album of the Year	Won
2015	Anugerah Musik Indonesia	Best Pop Album	Nominated
2015	Anugerah Musik Indonesia	Best Recording Album Producer	Won
2015	Anugerah Musik Indonesia	Best Graphic Design Album	Won
2015	Anugerah Musik Indonesia	Best of the Best Album	Nominated
2015	Hai Reader's Poll Music Awards	The Best Album	Won
