= Senja (genre) =

Indonesian indie genre

Senja songs
- Native name: Lagu Senja
- Etymology: Dusk
- Stylistic origins: Kroncong; indie folk; traditional music; folk pop, Balinese
- Cultural origins: mid 2010s, Indonesia

Other topics
- Indo pop

Senja songs (lit. Dusk songs) refers to a style of Indonesian independent music that is usually performed with minimalist acoustic arrangements (often just acoustic guitar, string bass, or soft percussion) or simple ambient touches. The lyrics are known to be poetic and melancholic, bringing a sense of deep contemplation, yet still feeling soothing. Thematically, senja indie songs often talk about love, memories, nature (e.g. dusk, rain, coffee), and personal reflections with aesthetic and metaphorical language. This style of music is often referred to as Indonesian indie-folk or folk-pop due to being heavily influenced by ballad-style acoustic folk. It is popular among millennial and Gen-Z Indonesians.

== Background ==
Historically, the term "indie" means independent, referring to musicians or bands that produce and distribute their work independently, without the auspices of a major label. In Indonesia itself, the independent music scene has been around since the 1970s, when rock band God Bless worked without a major label (called underground at the time).

In Indonesia, the 1990s marked a shift in terminology as the term "indie" gradually supplanted "underground" to describe independent music movements. During this period, several influential bands emerged and became cornerstones of the Indonesian indie scene. Among them were Mocca, Pas Band, Pure Saturday, Naif, Efek Rumah Kaca (ERK), Goodnight Electric, and numerous others. These groups contributed to the diversification and popularization of indie music in Indonesia, each bringing distinct sounds and identities that broadened the genre's appeal. However, the "indie" genre as a musical style with a "non-mainstream" connotation only developed later; especially in the 2000s, many independent bands emerged with a variety of genres (from alternative rock to jazz). The tradition of musicalising poetry in the previous decade also provided the foundation for the birth of Senja music. The senior folk duo AriReda (Ari Malibu & Reda Gaudiamo), who since the 1980s have consistently turned poems by writers into acoustic songs, inspired a new generation of poetic indie musicians. Young musicians such as Payung Teduh, the duo Teman Sebangku, Banda Neira, and soloist Frau recognise that AriReda's musical approach has influenced their works, paving the way for the development of the senja indie genre in the present era.

== Characteristic ==
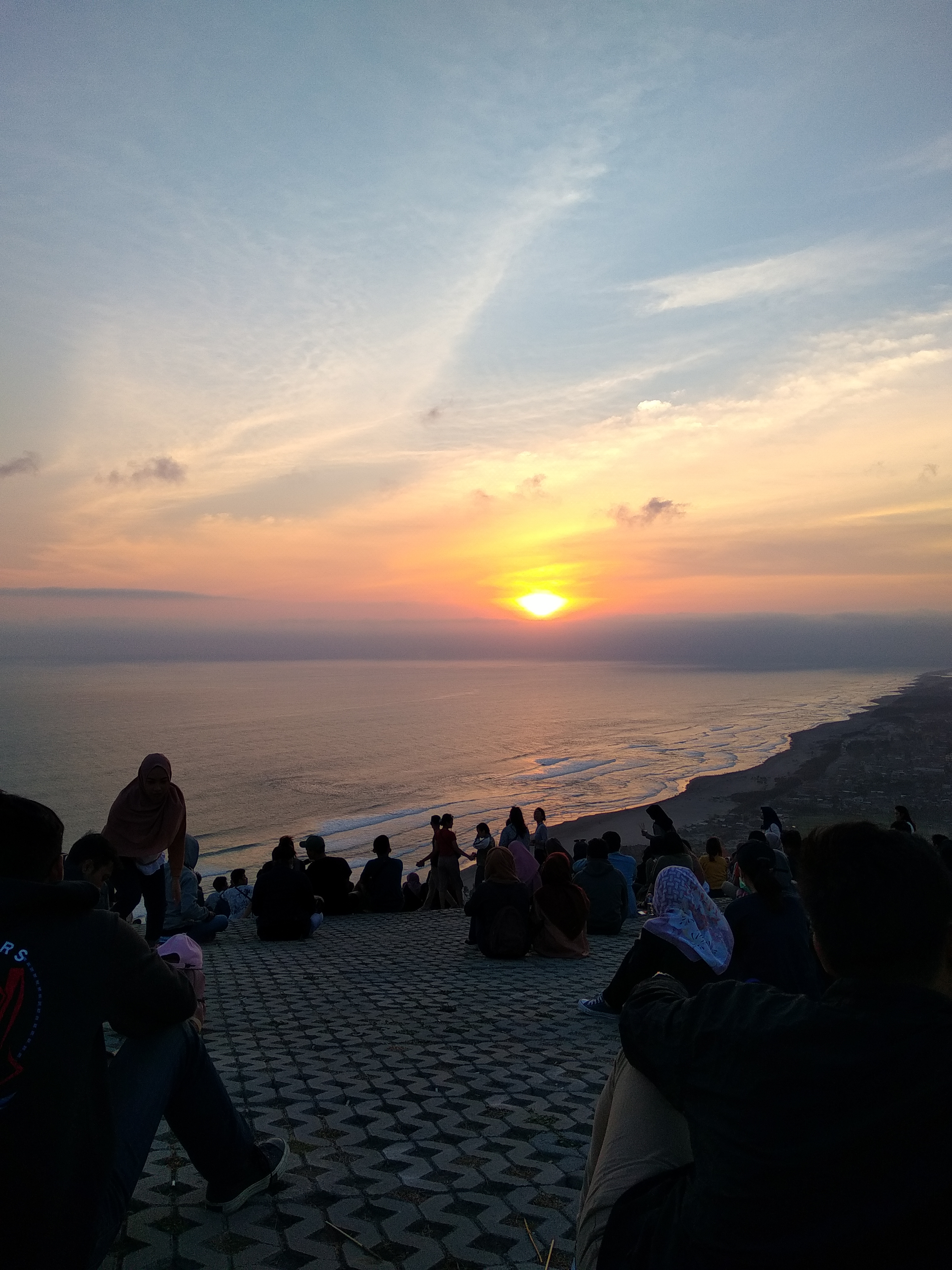
Indonesian youths watching the sunset in Parangtritis Hill, Yogyakarta. Introspective and tranquil mood is often evoked in Indonesian indie music within senja aesthetics.

Musically, the senja indie genre is defined by its intimate and minimalist acoustic instrumentation. The acoustic guitar serves as the primary instrument, often accompanied by cajón or understated drums, acoustic bass, and occasionally ukulele or violin to add depth and texture. Despite the simplicity, many senja songs subtly blend diverse influences. There is a strong root in folk and acoustic pop, often with touches of jazz, blues, or commonly traditional Indonesian music. Some Initial strides originates from Payung Teduh's use of kroncong-style ukulele or guitarlele strumming, intending to give the genre a localized character. Another folk-pop influenced trio, Soegi Bornean is renowned for blending Javanese and Kalimantan cultural elements into their music. Their breakout single, "Asmalibrasi," released in July 2019, garnered widespread acclaim and went viral on platforms like TikTok and Spotify. The song blends pentatonic melodies with stylistic echoes of Karungut, a traditional Central Kalimantan chant, featuring complex Indonesian lyrical prose and guitar duets reminiscent of Bornean Dayak harp styles.

"Pergi, Jauh" from Runtuh, Tumbuh (2019)
"Pergi, Jauh" by Reruntuh blends poetic sorrow with minimal acoustic textures, capturing the quiet yearning central to senja's indie sound. Note the usage of Indonesian-centric chords.

In terms of its lyrical approach, poeticism and sensitivity of meaning are the main characteristics. Artists typically avoids clichés and overtly melancholis expressions. Artists within this genre tend to distance themselves from formulaic love themes, instead favoring original and authentic forms of expression. The independent nature of the indie scene allows these musicians to write lyrics free from commercial market pressures, resulting in content that is often more honest, introspective, and creatively unique. The lyrics are written like rhymes or lyrical prose, containing indirect metaphors about nature, time, love, and heartbreak. The themes of the lyrics also tend to revolve around personal reflections and subtle emotions: for example about longing, aloneness, emptiness, or nostalgia which is often associated with the atmosphere of dusk.

Many songs mention the literal element of 'Dusk' as a symbol of melancholic beauty such like "Menuju Senja" (Payung Teduh), "Senja di Jakarta" (Banda Neira), "Diskusi Senja" (Fourtwnty), and "Nona Senja" (Fiersa Besari) all use the word dusk in both the title and lyrics, thus influencing the titling of the senja identity. Besides Senja, other poetic words such as rain, coffee, wind, sun, autumn leaves often appear as symbols of mood. The language style tends to be standardised or literary, far from everyday slang, making it seem beautiful and artistic. Some Indie artists prefer the intermixing of local Indonesian languages into such songs not only create an aesthetic tone, but also maintain and promote linguistic diversity in Indonesia. Artist such like Nosstress, intermixes between Indonesian and Balinese languages to build rapport with local and foreign audiences. Soegi Bornean uses uncommon Indonesian words, Javanese, and even Sanskritic Indonesian in her song "Asmalibrasi." These poetic lyrics are widely favoured by listeners in their late teens to 20s.

== Popularity ==
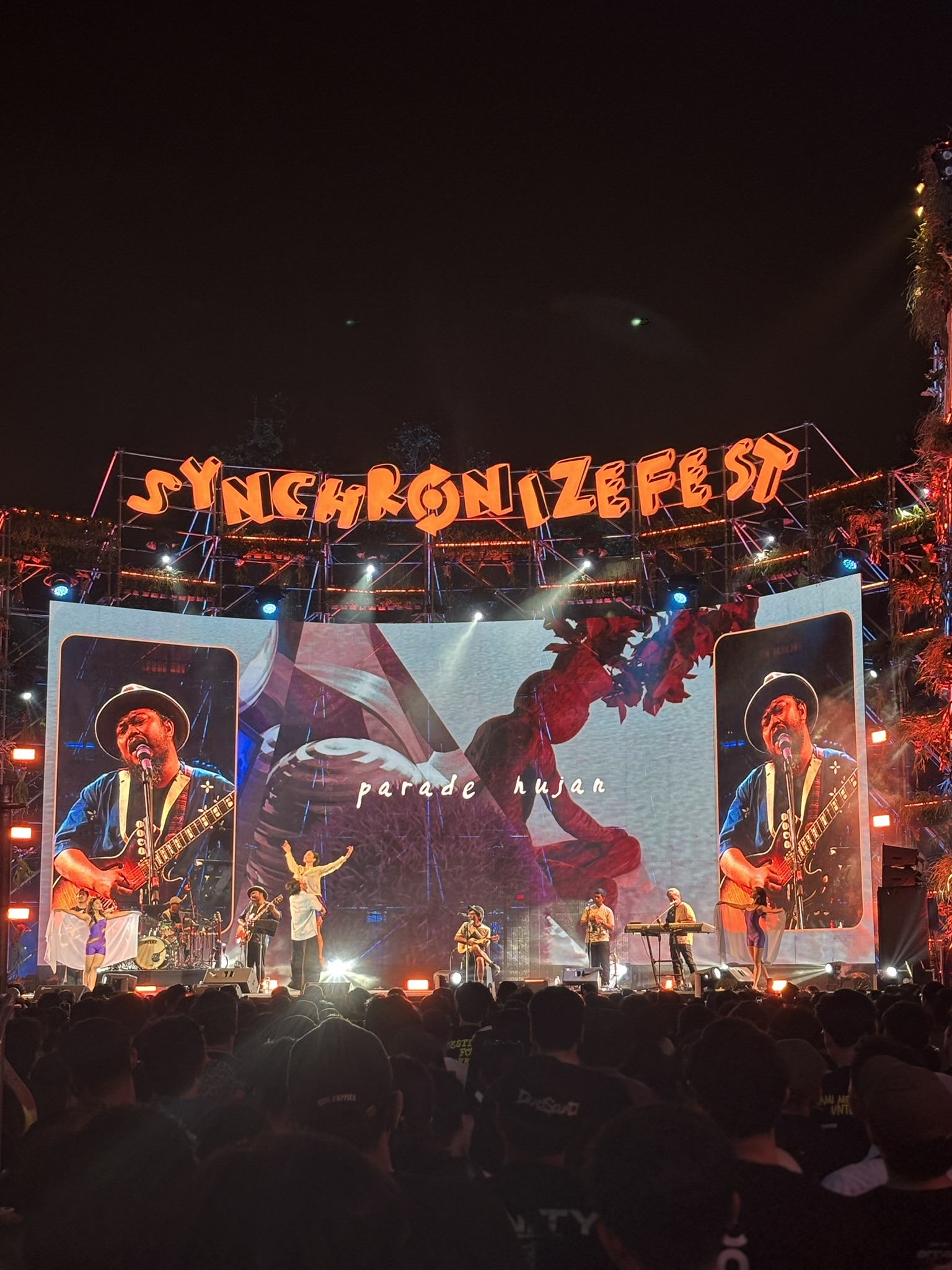
Parade Hujan (formerly known as Payung Teduh) performing at Synchronize Fest, Kemayoran, Jakarta.

In the early to mid-2010s, the Senja style of indie music was on the rise. The band Payung Teduh emerged as an important pioneer by combining acoustic folk, jazz and kroncong elements in their melodious songs. Since songs like "Untuk Perempuan yang Sedang Dalam Pelukan" and "Menuju Senja", Payung Teduh has captured the attention of independent music listeners. The last song being the main popularity for the term "Senja" for the sub culture and genre. This wave was followed by the emergence of other bands such as Fourtwnty, Banda Neira (band), Senar Senja, Danilla, Barasuara, Silampukau, to writers-musicians Fiersa Besari and others who offer alternative music nuances with different lyrics from the mainstream. They offer soft music and impressionistic lyrics - describing moments, times and conditions with deep contemplation. Some consider the emergence of alternative bands in the 2010s to be similar to the wave of indie bands in the 2000s, but with a different spirit that is more personal and poetic.

At its peak, around 2016‒2017, Senja indie music exploded in popularity. Payung Teduh's song "Akad" became a national phenomenon; the romantic and upbeat song dominated radio charts across Indonesia. The popularity of "Akad" had once become a staple song to accompany marriage proposals and weddings due to its instrumentation and lyrics. The success of Payung Teduh marks the growing acceptance of poetic indie music by the mainstream. However, Payung Teduh's frontman Mohammad Istiqamah Djamad, also known by "is", who had become the poster-boy of Indonesian Indie, announced his departure from the band in late 2017 amid creative differences. To whom, he felt that all indie bands in Indonesia were "doing business now."

Around the same time, Jakarta-based trio Fourtwnty also surged into prominence. On April 20, 2017 (coinciding with their 7th anniversary), Fourtwnty released "Zona Nyaman," a serene folk-pop single chosen as an official soundtrack for the indie film Filosofi Kopi 2: Ben & Jody. Blending relaxed acoustic guitar, soft vocals by Ari Lesmana, and life-affirming lyrics about stepping out of one's comfort zone, "Zona Nyaman" fit the coffeeshop atmosphere of the film. The song became immensely popular following the movie's mid-2017 release – introducing Fourtwnty's music to a broad audience. Notably, Fourtwnty had been active since 2010 with a folky sound, but 2017's success of "Zona Nyaman" and their album Ego & Fungsi Otak (2018) made them synonymous with the mellow indie and coffee culture movement in Indonesia. Another viral phenomenon of late 2017 was "Kukira Kau Rumah" by Bandung-based band Amigdala. Initially released on YouTube in October 2017 as a poem of heartbreak, sung in fragile female vocals, resonated with Indonesian listeners. The song "Kukira Kau Rumah" experienced a gradual rise in popularity throughout 2018, gaining widespread recognition for its emotional resonance and lyrical depth. Its cultural impact grew to the point that it was later adapted into a feature film, an example of a broader trend in which popular indie music inspires cinematic adaptations. Meanwhile, 2017 also saw comeback of Danilla Riyadi. Danilla released her second album Lintasan Waktu in August 2017, featuring dreamy folk/jazz-infused songs like "Kalapuna" and "Meramu." Her vocals and introspective lyrics earned critical praise, with the album being nominated for Indonesian Choice Awards 2018's Album of the Year. Danilla's music frequently graced online senja playlists alongside her male peers.

=== Culture ===
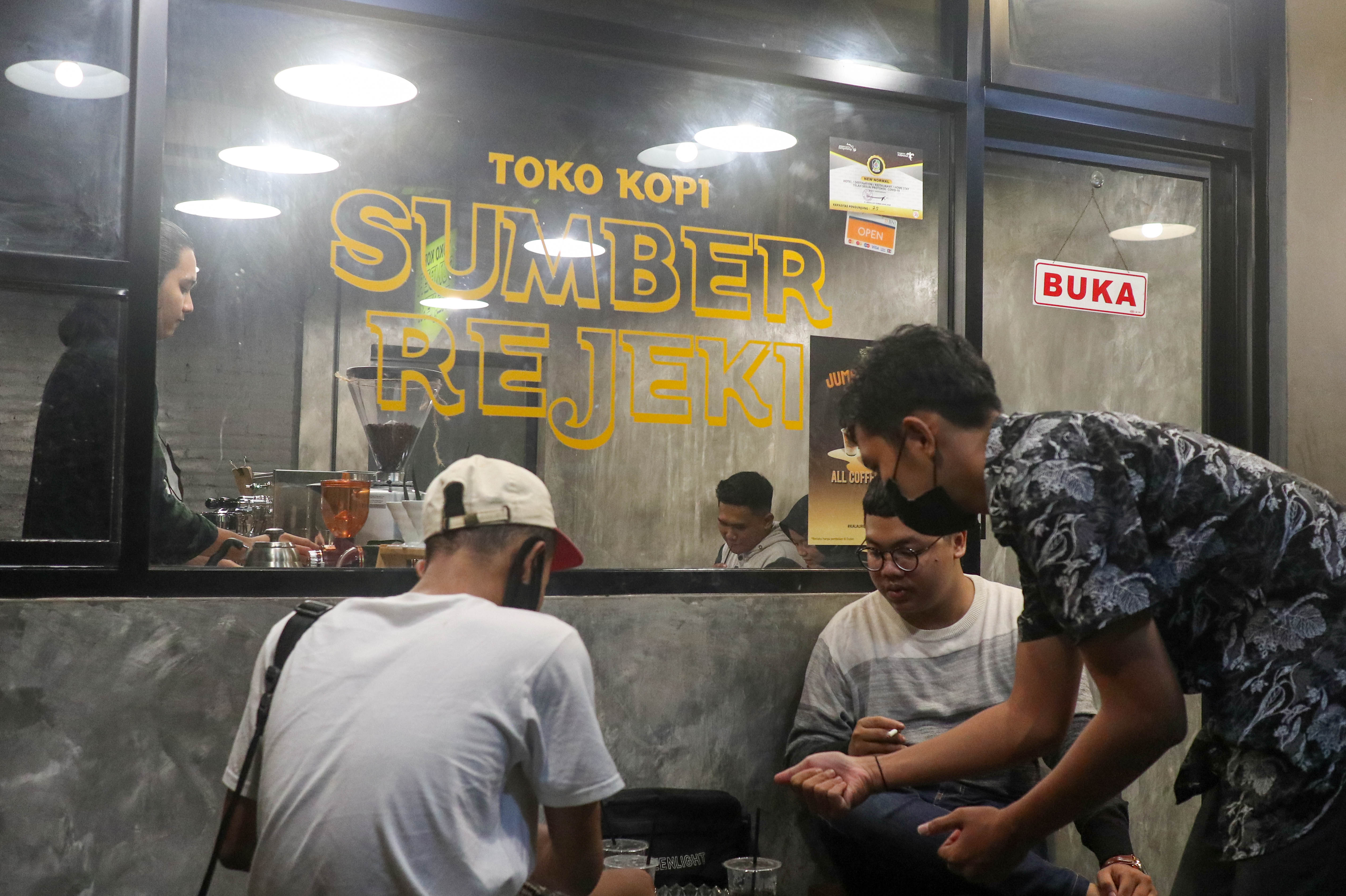
Senja songs are closely associated with Indonesian coffee culture and are commonly played in Gen-Z coffee shops

The term "anak senja" (lit. dusk child) has become a popular label in Indonesian popular culture to describe a group of young music enthusiasts who are known for their tendency to romanticize everyday life. This stereotype often portrays them as individuals who enjoy climbing mountains, sensitive, reading poetry, and savoring the late afternoon sunset with a cup of coffee while listening to indie songs. Over time, this image has evolved into a recognizable subculture, which also created a genre related fashion. Indie senja bands have come to symbolize a cultural niche that is, on one hand, admired for its authenticity and poetic sensibility, and on the other hand, occasionally parodied for its perceived clichés. Such as the prevalent idea among indonesian youths that one is not truly "cool" unless they drink coffee at dusk accompanied by indie music.

As more artists tried to emulate the style, skeptics argued that lagu senja was becoming formulaic for every song that use the same imagery and mood. Indonesian commentators poked fun at the predictability. Established indie musicians themselves have expressed ambivalence about the senja label. Is (Pusakata) of Payung Teduh has openly regretted inadvertently sparking the culture. He originally intended the motif of senja in his lyrics to symbolize death or an ending. However, the term has since been widely reinterpreted by audiences and fans as a romantic or melancholic expression of calmness and nostalgia. He lamented that there's a misunderstanding where artists like him are pigeonholed as "sunset musicians," and the culture implies "if it's not about senja, it's not cool." Similarly, some critics note that fans were conflating independent music with the senja stereotype. In response, educative pieces in the media have clarified that indie is a production mode and that musically the senja style leans toward folk-pop. Some artists, aware of this stereotype, have responded by either embracing it or evolving their style to avoid being pigeonholed. For example, certain indie acts that initially focused on senja themes have expanded their repertoire to address topics such as mental health and social issues, as seen in the work of artists like Hindia and Kunto Aji.
