= Kisah Klasik Untuk Masa Depan =

Studio album by Sheila on 7
- Released: April 2001
- Genres: Pop rock, power ballad, power pop, soft rock, alternative rock
- Label: Sony BMG Indonesia

Sheila on 7 chronology
Sheila on 7 (1999)	Kisah Klasik Untuk Masa Depan (2001)	07 Des (2002)

Kisah Klasik Untuk Masa Depan (English: The Classic Story For The Future) is the second studio album by Indonesian rock band Sheila on 7 released in 2001. It contains the hit singles "Sahabat Sejati", "Bila Kau Tak Disampingku", and "Sephia". Kisah Klasik Untuk Masa Depan had sold over 1.7 million copies in Indonesia.

Sephia song by Sheila on 7 used for Soundtrack of Sinetrons with Same title, Sephia broadcast by SCTV year 2002. Starring Marcella Zalianty, Irgi Fahrezi, etc.

== Track listing ==
All tracks are written by Eross Candra, except "Just For My Mom" and "Lihat Dengar Rasakan".

No.	Title	Length
1.	"Sahabat Sejati"	4:15
2.	"Bila Kau Tak Disampingku"	4:20
3.	"Sephia"	4:50
4.	"Just For My Mom" (Adam Subarkah and Eross Candra)	3:20
5.	"Temani Aku"	2:52
6.	"Sebuah Kisah Klasik"	3:54
7.	"Pagi Yang Menakjubkan"	4:05
8.	"Lihat, Dengar, Rasakan" (Adam Subarkah)	3:54
9.	"Tunggu Aku di Jakarta"	4:47
10.	"Karna Aku Setia"	3:23
11.	"Tunjuk Satu Bintang"	4:09
12.	"Selamat Tidur"	1:58

== Cover Versions ==
In 2002, Taiwanese singer Chyi Chin covered the song Sephia in Mandarin under the title Sophia.
