= Akhdiyat Duta Modjo =

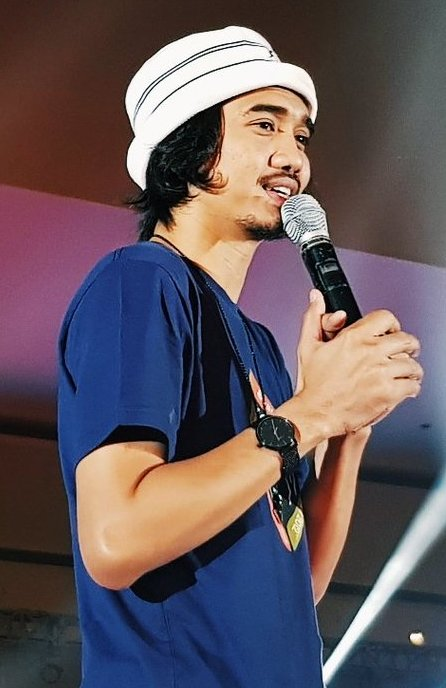

Background information
- Also known as: Duta
- Born: Akhdiyat Duta Modjo; April 30, 1980 (age 46); Lexington, Kentucky, United States
- Genres: Pop, pop rock, alternative rock, power pop, hard rock, soft rock
- Occupations: Singer-songwriter, musician, actor, multi-instrumentalist, talent judge
- Years active: 1997 - present
- Member of: Sheila on 7
- Website: sheilaon7.com

Akhdiyat Duta Modjo (popularly known as Duta; born in Lexington, Kentucky on April 30, 1980) is the vocalist of Indonesian band, Sheila on 7.

== Early life ==
Duta is the eldest of two brothers. His father, Hakam S. Modjo, was a native of Limboto, Gorontalo and a professor of plant pathology at the Gadjah Mada University in Yogyakarta. From his father's lineage, Duta is a descendant of Kyai Mojo, a well-known Javanese Muslim cleric who fought alongside Diponegoro during the Java War and was exiled to the northern mountains of Sulawesi.

Duta was born in Lexington, Kentucky while his father pursued his graduate studies at the University of Kentucky. His family later settled in Yogya, where Duta grew up and briefly studied agricultural technology at Gadjah Mada; he dropped out to pursue his musical career with Sheila on 7.

Duta is married to Adelia Lontoh, a former model; the couple had two children.

== Filmography ==
- 30 Hari Mencari Cinta (2004)
- Tak Biasa (2004)
- Ambilkan Bulan (2012)
