= Sheila on 7 =

Indonesian alternative rock band

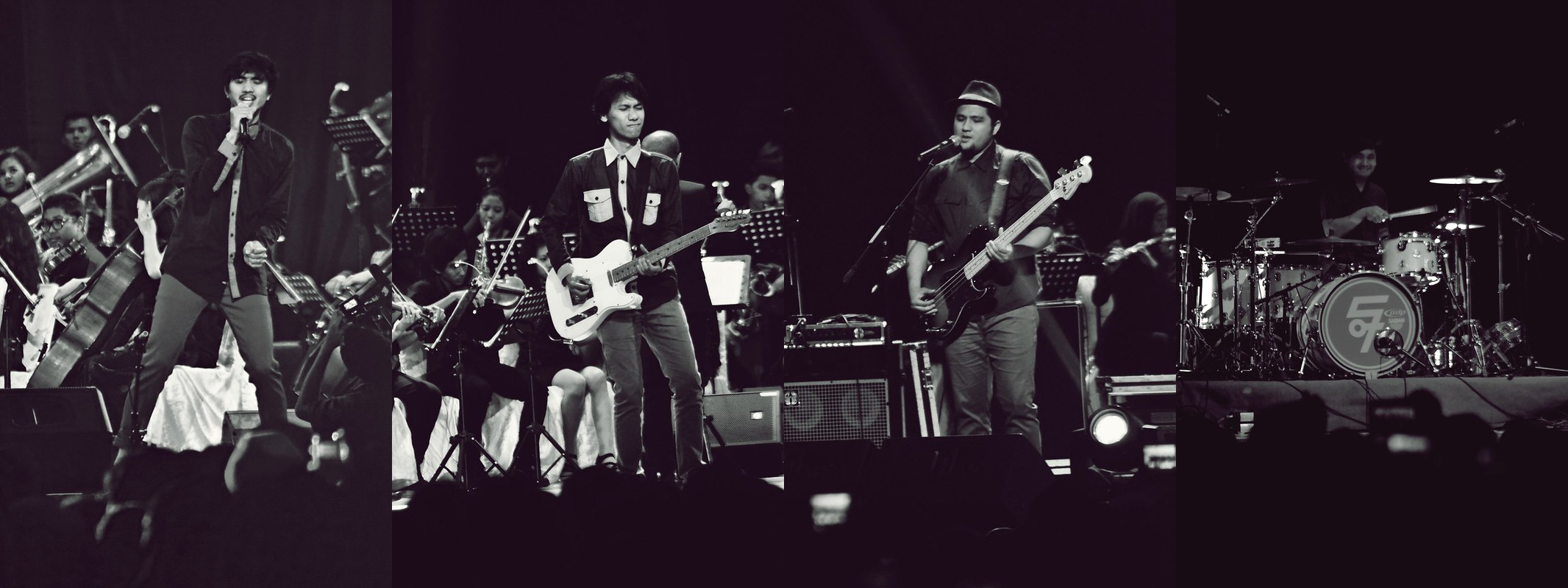
- Sheila on 7 on stage in 2013

Background information
- Also known as: SO7; 507; Sheila On 7
- Origin: Yogyakarta, Indonesia
- Genres: Alternative rock; pop rock; rock
- Years active: 1996–present
- Labels: Sony Music Entertainment Indonesia (1998–2017); 507 Records (2017–present); Massive Music Entertainment (2017-present)
- Members: Eross Candra; Akhdiyat Duta Modjo; Adam Muhammad Subarkah
- Past members: Anton Widiastanto; Saktia Ari Seno; Brian Kresna Putro
- Website: www.sheilaon7.com

Sheila on 7 is an alternative rock band from Yogyakarta, Indonesia. They have changed their lineup several times since their formation on 6 May 1996. Their first lineup consisted of Akhdiyat Duta Modjo (also known as Duta, vocals), Saktia "Sakti" Ari Seno (guitar), Eross Candra (guitar), Adam Muhammad Subarkah (bass), and Anton Widiastanto (drums). Anton left the group in 2004, while Sakti left in 2006, leaving their current lineup as it is, but with Brian Kresna Putro replacing Anton in the drums until his departure in 2022.

Their self titled debut album Sheila on 7 was ranked #33 by Rolling Stone Indonesia on "The 150 Greatest Indonesian Albums of All Time". The magazine also listed the songs "Dan" (#29) and "Melompat Lebih Tinggi" (#147) on "The 150 Greatest Indonesian Songs of All Time".

Sheila on 7 is the first ever band in Indonesia with their first 3 albums sold more than 1 million copies in Indonesia only, with Kisah Klasik Untuk Masa Depan ranked #8 and Sheila on 7 ranked #13 on the list of Indonesian all time best selling albums. Kisah Klasik Untuk Masa Depan charted at #1 on Hits Albums of the World on Billboard Malaysia. By now, Sheila on 7 has sold estimated more than 8 million copies album in Indonesia.

== History ==
The band came from an earlier incarnation called " W.H.Y Gank " which was headed by Adam and Sakti. Both members had invited Duta - who had been performing with Adam at as a singer and acoustic guitar duo at their neighbourhood's 17 August celebrations - to join their band practice to be a vocalist. A year after "W.H.Y Gank" was formed, the band met Eross (who then became their lead guitarist and leader of the band). The four of them decided to form a new band, and while at their first studio jamming session Eross introduced the band to Anton. The band was given the name "Sheilagank" - "Sheila" being the name of a female friend both Adam and Eross knew of - with the official formation date being 6 May 1996. Sheilagank performed in numerous band festivals organised by high schools for about 2 years until the middle of 1998, when they got their first recording contract with the Sony Music Entertainment Indonesia label. The members changed their band name to "Sheila On 7": the "on 7" referring to the seven-note solfège, while "Sheilagank" became the name of their fanbase.

Since Sheila On 7's beginning in the Indonesian music scene, it has made a lot of achievements, including being the only Indonesian band that is able to sell physical album's for more than one million copies, with three albums in a row. Through the success of the debut album Sheila On 7 (1999), followed by two other albums that exploded in the market, Kisah Klasik Untuk Masa Depan (2000) and 07 Des (2002). In 2003, they released their first film soundtrack Ost. 30 Hari Mencari Cinta which succeeded to sold over 600.000 copies and followed by their fourth studio album Pejantan Tangguh in 2004, although not as successful as the first three albums where sales reached millions, this album was able to sell more than 450,000 copies. Because of that success, they also have loyal listeners in neighboring countries such as Malaysia, Singapore and Brunei.

On 18 October 2004, Anton was dismissed from the band management due to disciplinary issues while Brian filled Anton's position. Brian performed with Sheila On 7 in different promo tours for the album Pejantan Tangguh. The Very Best of Sheila On 7: Jalan Terus (2005) album became the first studio recording release after the drummer replacement.

In 2006, Sakti left the band amidst recording 507 as he was to continue his studies in Pakistan and this did not gel with their schedule. It was during this time that Brian was promoted as their permanent drummer until 2022.

On 26 January 2018, Sheila on 7 released their first single entitled "Film Favorit" under their own label named 507 Records. It also be their first time to involves music directors for working on their song. "Film Favorit" itself is a song created by guitarist Eross, which inspired the story of a close friend who has not managed to find a life partner.

On November 25, 2024, they released their latest single titled "Memori Baik," featuring Aishameglio, the daughter of Duta.

== Musical style ==
Their musical style is deemed difficult to determine though it is still in the pop rock genre, but it is clear that they are believed to play a "Sheila music", where ideas or creations for their songs emerge spontaneously, hence the simple lyrics and musical concepts. Sheila on 7 tend to compose upbeat and optimistic songs that reflect the bliss of being teenagers and young adults.

== Band members ==
Current members

- Akhdiyat Duta Modjo — lead vocal (1996–present)
- Eross Candra — lead guitar & backing vocal (1996–present)
- Adam Muhammad Subarkah — bass guitar & backing vocal (1996–present)

Former members

- Anton Widiastanto — drummer (1996–2004)
- Saktia Ari Seno — rhythm and lead guitar & backing vocal (1996–2006)
- Brian Kresna Putro - drummer (2004-2022)

== Discography ==
=== Studio albums ===
| Title | Album details | Sales | Certifications |
|---|---|---|---|
| Sheila On 7 | Released: 16 March 1999; Label: Sony Music Entertainment Indonesia; Formats: CD, cassette, digital download | 1,300,000+ | ASIRI: Multi Platinum |
| Kisah Klasik Untuk Masa Depan (Classic Tales for the Future) | Released: 20 September 2000; Label: Sony Music (Indonesia, Malaysia, Singapore); Formats: CD, cassette, digital download | 1,700,000+ | ASIRI: Multi Platinum |
| 07 Des | Released: 18 March 2002; Label: Sony Music (Indonesia, Malaysia, Singapore); Formats: CD, cassette, digital download | 1,300,000+ | ASIRI: Multi Platinum |
| Pejantan Tangguh^{[a]} (Alpha Male) | Released: 25 May 2004; Label: Sony Music (Indonesia, Malaysia, Singapore); Formats: CD, cassette, digital download | 450,000+ | ASIRI: 3× Platinum |
| 507 | Released: 1 June 2006; Label: Sony BMG Music Entertainment Indonesia; Formats: CD, cassette, digital download | —N/a | —N/a |
| Menentukan Arah (Determine the Direction) | Released: 28 July 2008; Label: Sony BMG Music Entertainment Indonesia; Formats: CD, digital download | —N/a | —N/a |
| Berlayar (Sailing) | Released: 15 March 2011; Label: Sony Music Entertainment Indonesia; Formats: CD, digital download | 1.000.000+ | ASIRI: Multi Platinum |
| Musim Yang Baik (Good Season) | Released: 10 December 2014; Label: Sony Music Entertainment Indonesia; Formats: CD, digital download | —N/a | —N/a |

=== Compilation albums ===
| Title | Album details | Sales | Certifications |
|---|---|---|---|
| OST. 30 Hari Mencari Cinta (OST. 30 Days Looking for Love) | Released: 5 December 2003; Label: Sony Music (Indonesia, Malaysia); Formats: CD, cassette, digital download | 600,000+ | ASIRI: 4× Platinum |
| The Very Best of Sheila On 7: Jalan Terus (The Very Best of Sheila On 7: Move Along) | Released: 2005; Label: Sony Music Entertainment Indonesia; Formats: CD & cassette | —N/a | —N/a |
| Sheila On 7 Top Request (Sheila On 7 Top Hits) | Released: 2009; Label: Sony Music Entertainment Indonesia; Formats: CD & digital download | —N/a | —N/a |

=== Filmography ===
- 30 Hari Mencari Cinta (2004)
- Tak Biasa (2004)
- Mati Bujang Tengah Malam (2007)
- Tanda Tanya (2012)
- Scripts Pro (2014)

== Awards and nominations ==
| Award | Year | Category | Work/Nominee | Result | Ref. |
|---|---|---|---|---|---|
| Panasonic Awards | 1999 | Best Music Video | "Dan" | Won | |
| Indonesian Music Awards | 1999 | Best Pop Song | "Dan" | Won | |
| MTV Indonesia Awards | 2000 | Most Favorite New Artist | "Dan" | Won | |
| Indonesian Music Awards | 2001 | Best Progressive Pop Song | "Sephia" | Won | |
| Indonesian Music Awards | 2001 | Best Song | "Sephia" | Won | |
| Indonesian Music Awards | 2001 | Best Recording Artist | "Sephia" | Nominated | |
| Indonesian Music Awards | 2001 | Best Album | Kisah Klasik Untuk Masa Depan | Nominated | |
| Indonesian Music Awards | 2001 | Best Progressive Pop Album | Kisah Klasik Untuk Masa Depan | Nominated | |
| Indonesian Music Awards | 2001 | Best Progressive Pop Duo/Group | "Tunjuk Satu Bintang" | Nominated | |
| Popular Star Awards | 2001 | Popular Star Special Award | Sheila on 7 | Won | |
| Music Planet Awards | 2002 | Most Popular Duo/Group | Sheila on 7 | Won | |
| Indonesian Music Awards | 2002 | Best Pop Album | 07 Des | Won | |
| Music Planet Awards | 2003 | Most Popular Duo/Group | Sheila on 7 | Won | |
| Music Planet Awards | 2003 | Best Duo/Group | Sheila on 7 | Won | |
| Indonesian Music Awards | 2004 | Best Duo/Alternative Pop Group | Pejantan Tangguh | Won | |
| Indonesian Music Awards | 2004 | Best Alternative Pop Album | Pejantan Tangguh | Won | |
| Indonesian Music Awards | 2004 | Best of the Best Album | Pejantan Tangguh | Won | |
| Indonesian Music Awards | 2004 | Best Alternative Pop Song | "Pejantan Tangguh" | Won | |
| Music Planet Awards | 2005 | Best Duo/Group | Sheila on 7 | Won | |
| Music Planet Awards | 2005 | APM Best Song | "Berhenti Berharap" | Won | |
| Music Industry Awards | 2005 | Best Indonesian Album | Ost. 30 Hari Mencari Cinta | Won | |
| Indonesian Music Awards | 2012 | Best Pop Duo/Group | Sheila on 7 | Nominated | |
| Indonesian Music Awards | 2013 | Best Children Duo/Group/Vocal Group/Collaboration | "Ambilkan Bulan" | Nominated | |
| Indonesian Choice Awards | 2015 | Song of the Year | "Lapang Dada" | Won | |
| Indonesian Choice Awards | 2015 | Album of the Year | Musim Yang Baik | Won | |
| Indonesian Choice Awards | 2015 | Band/Group/Duo of the Year | Sheila on 7 | Won | |
| Indonesian Music Awards | 2015 | Best Pop Duo/Group | "Lapang Dada" | Nominated | |
| Indonesian Music Awards | 2015 | Best Pop Recording Producer | Eross Candra | Nominated | |
| Indonesian Music Awards | 2015 | Best Pop Album | Musim Yang Baik | Nominated | |
| Indonesian Music Awards | 2015 | Best of the Best Album | Musim Yang Baik | Nominated | |
| Dahsyatnya Awards | 2015 | Outstanding Video Clip | "Lapang Dada" | Nominated | |
| Dahsyatnya Awards | 2016 | Outstanding Song | "Lapang Dada" | Won | |
| Indonesian Choice Awards | 2018 | Song of the Year | "Film Favorit" | Won | |
| Indonesian Choice Awards | 2018 | Band/Group/Duo of the Year | Sheila on 7 | Won | |

== Notes ==
^{a} The album was renamed as Pria Terhebat in the Malaysian and Singaporean releases.
