= Sheila on 7 (album) =

Studio album by Sheila on 7
- Released: 16 March 1999
- Genre: Alternative rock, Pop rock, pop, power pop, blues rock, hard rock
- Label: Sony Music Indonesia

Sheila on 7 chronology
Sheila on 7 (1999)	Kisah Klasik Untuk Masa Depan (2000)

Sheila on 7 is the debut studio album by Indonesian rock band Sheila on 7. It was released in 1999.

== Track listing ==
Sheila on 7 track listing
No.	Title	Length
1.	"Tertatih"	4:42
2.	"Kita"	4:33
3.	"J.A.P"	4:41
4.	"Anugerah Terindah Yang Pernah Kumiliki"	4:23
5.	"Pe De"	4:01
6.	"Dan"	4:46
7.	"Terlintas 2 Kata"	4:38
8.	"Berai"	4:21
9.	"Bobrok"	3:39
10.	"Perhatikan, Rani!"	5:10
Total length:		44:54

== All-time charts ==
Country	Peak position
Indonesia (Top 150 Greatest Albums)	33
