= Fiersa Besari =

Indonesian musician, singer, and songwriter (born 1984)

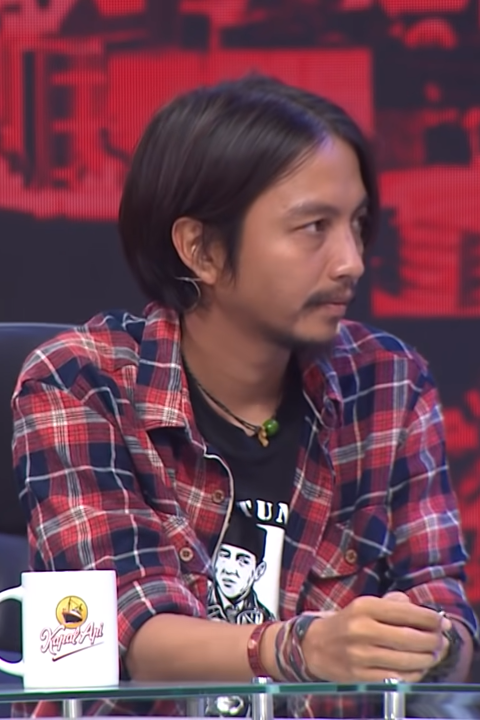
- Besari in 2020
- Born: 3 March 1984 (age 42); Bandung, Indonesia
- Occupations: Singer; songwriter; musician; author
- Height: 1.69 m (5 ft 7 in)
- Spouse: Aqia Nurfadla (m. 2019)
- Children: 1
- Musical career
- Genres: Senja; Folk; folk-pop; folk rock; pop rock; emo (early); pop punk (early)
- Instruments: Vocals; guitar
- Years active: 2009–present
- Partner: Kerabat Kerja
- Website: fiersabesari.com

Fiersa Besari (born 3 March 1984) is an Indonesian singer, songwriter, musician and author. He is best known for his music, which is often described as an "indie music" style. Besari has made several albums, including Tempat Aku Pulang (2014) and Konspirasi Alam Semesta (2015) and has recorded hit songs including "Celengan Rindu", "Waktu yang Salah" dan "April".

As an author, he has produced six novels and is also involved as one of the founders of Komunitas Pecandu Buku (English: Book Addict Community). Besari is also active as a mountaineering content creator. He is starting the Atap Negeri journey, where he will climb 33 mountains in 33 provinces in Indonesia, which will be uploaded on his YouTube channel.

== Music career ==
Besari began his career as a vocalist for several indie emo/pop punk bands, such as Hellfairies and Eat Well Earl. Eat Well Earl was formed by Fiersa and his friends with their song "Standing Next To You". However, the band disbanded when Besari's friends got married one by one, which then forced him to pursue a solo career.

In 2009, he began recording and storing music from indie pop ballad songs he wrote, which were later compiled into an album. Besari then decided to sell his album in 2012. "Melangkah Tanpamu" is the embryo of his works and 11:11 is his first album, which six years later becomes a book with the same title.

His music takes a long time to become widely known. Songs such as "April" which was composed in 2012, then "Celengan Rindu," "Waktu yang Salah," and "Tempat Aku Pulang" which was released from the album Tempat Aku Pulang (2014), as well as "Juara Kedua, " "Rumah," "Kau," "Garis Terdepan," "Nadir," and "Hingga Napas Ini Habis" which were released from the album Konspirasi Alam Semesta (2015) were popular as the late 2010s approached.

As of December 2018, Besari is on the Billboard Social 50 chart, a chart that ranks the most active musical artists on the world's leading social networking services. He is ranked 49th, above Ed Sheeran, who is ranked 50th. His song, "Pelukku untuk Pelikmu" was also lined up to become the soundtrack for the 2019 Indonesian film Imperfect.

== Writing ==
Besari made his debut as an author with his novel, Garis Waktu, published by Media Kita in 2016. The novel was later adapted into a film by Dapur Film and MD Pictures with the same title. The film was directed by Jeihan Angga and starred Michelle Ziudith, Reza Rahadian and Anya Geraldine and was released in cinemas throughout Indonesia on 24 February 2022.

The rest of his novels are, Konspirasi Alam Semesta (2017), Catatan Juang (2017), Arah Langkah (2018), 11:11 (2018) and Tapak Jejak (2019).

== Discography ==
=== Studio albums ===
- 11:11 (2012)
- Tempat Aku Pulang (2014)
- Konspirasi Alam Semesta (2015)
- Album 20:20 (2020)
- Berjalan Mundur (2022)

=== Singles ===
Title	Year	Peak chart positions	Album
Title	Year	IDN	Album
"Tempat Aku Pulang"	2014	—	Tempat Aku Pulang
"Konspirasi Alam Semesta"	2015	—	Konspirasi Alam Semesta
"Garis Waktu"	2016	—	Non-album single
"Pemeran Pengganti"	2017	—	Non-album single
"Belum Punah"	2018	—	Non-album single
"Dirgahayu"	2018	—	Non-album single
"Obsesi"	2018	—	Non-album single
"Cerita Panjang Dihidup Yang Singkat"	2018	—	Non-album single
"Salahkah Mengalah"	2018	—	Non-album single
"Terima Kasih Dan Maaf"	2018	—	Non-album single
"Cerita Rakyat"	2018	—	Non-album single
"Petualangan"	2018	—	Non-album single
"Pelukku Untuk Pelikmu"	2019	5	Non-album single
"Bukan Lagu Valentine"	2020	—	Non-album single
"Lekas Pulih"	2020	—	Non-album single

=== Guest appearances ===
- "Ibu Pertiwi" (with Iwan Fals and Once Mekel) (OST Bumi Manusia) (2019)
- "Balada Si Roy" (with Eet Sjahranie) (OST Balada Si Roy) (2022)

== Books ==
- Garis Waktu (2016)
- Konspirasi Alam Semesta (2017)
- Catatan Juang (2017)
- Arah Langkah (2018)
- 11:11 (2018)
- Tapak Jejak (2019)

== Awards and nominations ==
Year	Organization	Category	Nominee/work	Result	Ref.
2019	IKAPI Awards	Rookie of the Year	Fiersa Besari	Won	
2020	Maya Awards	Best Theme Song	"Pelukku Untuk Pelikmu"	Nominated	
2020	Billboard Indonesia Music Awards	Top Collaboration Song Of The Year	"Waktu Yang Salah" (featuring Thantri Soendari)	Nominated	
2020	Billboard Indonesia Music Awards	Top Social Artist Of The Year	Fiersa Besari	Nominated	
2020	Billboard Indonesia Music Awards	Top Male Singer Of The Year	Fiersa Besari	Won	
2020	Anugerah Musik Indonesia	Best Pop Male Solo Artist	"Pelukku Untuk Pelikmu"	Nominated	
2020	Anugerah Musik Indonesia	Best Original Soundtrack Production Work	"Pelukku Untuk Pelikmu"	Nominated	
2022	Anugerah Musik Indonesia	Best Folk/Country/Ballad Production Work	"Runtuh" (with Feby Putri)	Won	
2022	Anugerah Musik Indonesia	Best Collaborative Production Work	"Runtuh" (with Feby Putri)	Nominated	
