= Feby Putri =

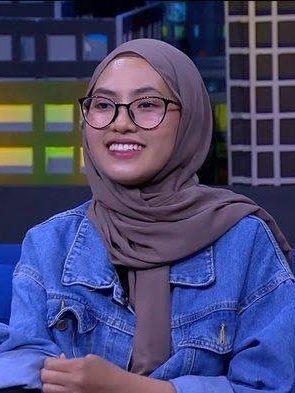
- Feby on NET's Tonight Show

Background information
- Born: Feby Putri Nilam Cahyani; 2000 (age 25–26); Makassar, South Sulawesi, Indonesia
- Genres: Indo pop
- Occupation: Singer
- Years active: 2019–present
- Label: Bync Records

Feby Putri Nilam Cahyani known as Feby Putri is an Indonesian singer-songwriter. She is known for her song Runtuh with Fiersa Besari reached the peak of the Spotify Indonesia chart.

== Personal life ==
Putri was born in Makassar, Indonesia and moved to Jakarta when she was 18.

== Career ==
Putri has released two albums and one extended play. The single Runtuh performed with Fiersa Besari earned the 2022 Indonesian Music Awards award for "Best Folk/Country/Ballad Production Work".

== Discography ==
=== Studio albums ===
Title	Album details
Riuh	Released: January 21, 2022; Label: Bync Records; Formats: CD, digital download; Track list: 1. "Rantau"; 2. "Halu"; 3. "Alih"; 4. "Cahaya"; 5. "Usik"; 6. "Dera"; 7. "Liar Angin"; 8. "Awal"; 9. "Diri"; 10. "Berkesudahan"
Hitam Putih	Released: September 26, 2024; Label: Bync Records; Formats: CD, digital download; Track list: 1. "Semoga Ada Waktu Luang"; 2. "Tangan-Tangan Ucap Perpisahan"; 3. "Tayangan Oleh Kepala"; 4. "Senyum Semu"; 5. "Durasi" (ft. Kapal Udara); 6. "Suara Ibu"; 7. "Daya Diri"; 8. "Turut"; 9. "Guratan Tangan"; 10. "Perasa yang Baru Tumbuh"

=== Extended plays ===
Title	Album details
2016	Released: March 31, 2023; Label: Bync Records; Formats: digital download; Track list: 1. "orang yang sama, masa yang beda (intro) " 2. "andai kata " 3. "sendiri dulu " 4. "bagai bintang bulan " 5. "detik, menit, jam "

=== Singles ===
As lead singer
Title	Year	Peak chart position	Album
Title	Year	IDN Songs	Album
"Halu"	2019	8	Riuh
"Usik"	2019	—	Riuh
"Naradira" (with Luthfi Aulia)	2020	*	Non-album single
"Cahaya"	2021	*	Riuh
"Liar Angin"	2021	*	Riuh
"Runtuh" (featuring Fiersa Besari)	2021	10	Non-album singles
"Tanpa Pamrih"	2022	—	Non-album singles
"Kembali Pulang" (with Suara Kayu)	2022	—	Non-album singles
"—" Release did not chart or was not released in region. "*" Did not chart at the time of release.

As featured singer
Title	Year	Album
"Rindu Tak Bersuara" (Alffy Rev featuring Feby Putri)	2019	Non-album single

== Awards and nominations ==
Year	Award	Category	Work	Result
2022	Anugerah Musik Indonesia	Best Alternative Male/Female Solo Artist	"Rantau"	Nominated
2022	Anugerah Musik Indonesia	Best Folk/Country/Ballad Production	"Runtuh" (featuring Fiersa Besari)	Won
2022	Anugerah Musik Indonesia	Best Collaborative Production Work	"Runtuh" (featuring Fiersa Besari)	Nominated
