= Ras Muhamad =

Indonesian reggae singer

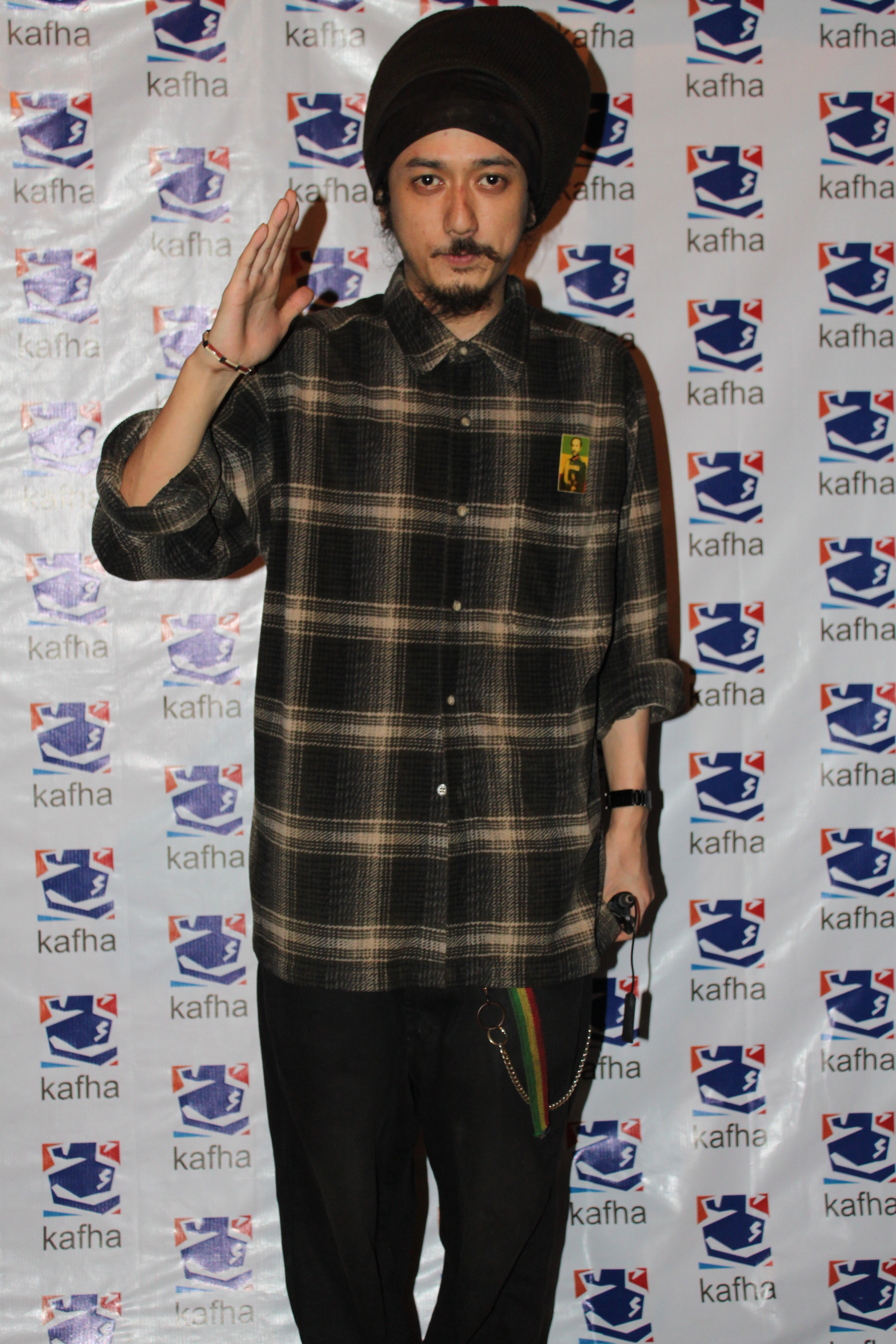

Background information
- Born: Muhamad Egar; October 29, 1982 (age 43); Jakarta, Indonesia
- Genres: Reggae; dancehall
- Years active: 2005–present
- Label: Oneness Records

Muhamad Egar known by his stage name Ras Muhamad (born October 29, 1982) is an Indonesian reggae singer. He took his stage name while a student in Brooklyn, United States.

== Early life and education ==
Muhamad Egar was born on October 29, 1982, in Jakarta, to Rivai and Wening Esthyprobo. His mother moved to the United States as an Indonesian economic diplomat shortly after Muhamed graduated from Harapan Ibu Pondok Indah. He studied at Russell Sage Junior High School while living in New York City with his mother. In 1999, he attended Forest Hill High School, while his mother returned to Indonesia to spend time with his youngest brother. Subsequently, Muhamad continued his studies in art at the Borough of Manhattan Community College Faculty Liberal Arts and graduated in 2005.

== Career ==
=== 2005-2007: Declaration of Truth and Reggae Ambassador ===
His debut studio album Declaration of Truth was released while he was living in Brooklyn. The album was launched in New York City. His debut album brought him some popularity in his birth country.

Two years later, returning to Indonesia, Muhamad released debut studio album Reggae Ambassador on January by Equinox DMD, a company distributing music in iTunes. Indonesian Rolling Stones awarding him as Best Reggae Act in 2008 and earning nominations for Best Reggae Composition in Anugerah Musik Indonesia.

=== 2009-2013: Next Chapter, Negeri Pelangi, Berjaya and book ===
His second studio album Next Chapter was released in 2009. It featured many collaboration with national and international musicians.

Three years later, Muhamad released his third studio album Negeri Pelangi and the produced the first self-titled single of Indonesian reggae artist Tony Q Rastafara. A year after his third album, Muhamad published his first book, about Reggae history, vision and philosophy between Jamaica, Ethiopia and Indonesia. The book sold well in Indonesia and internationally. In 2012, Muhamad won an Indonesian Cutting Edge Music Award (ICEMA).

In 2013, Muhamad also released his fourth studio album Berjaya and singles including “Berjaya” and “Kembali” with Endah N Rhesa. For the single “Berjaya”, Muhamad won Anugerah Musik Indonesia for 2013 Best Reggae/Ska/Dub Production Work.

=== 2014-present: Salam ===
Muhamad signed to Oneness Record and released his fifth studio album, entitled Salam, on July 14, on which he again collaborated with international reggae musicians such as Sara Lugo, Kabaka Pyramid and Uwe Kaa. The album was successful within the reggae music industry and charted number one on the Dutch site reggae-vibes.com.

In 2016, Muhamad held a concert in America and a tour in Europe to promote the album.

== Discography ==
=== Studio albums ===
- Declaration of Truths (2005)
- Reggae Ambassador (2007)
- Next Chapter (2009)
- Negeri Pelangi (2012)
- Berjaya (2013)
- Salam (2014)
- Bambu Keras (2018)
