= Kunto Aji =

Indonesian singer and songwriter (born 1987)

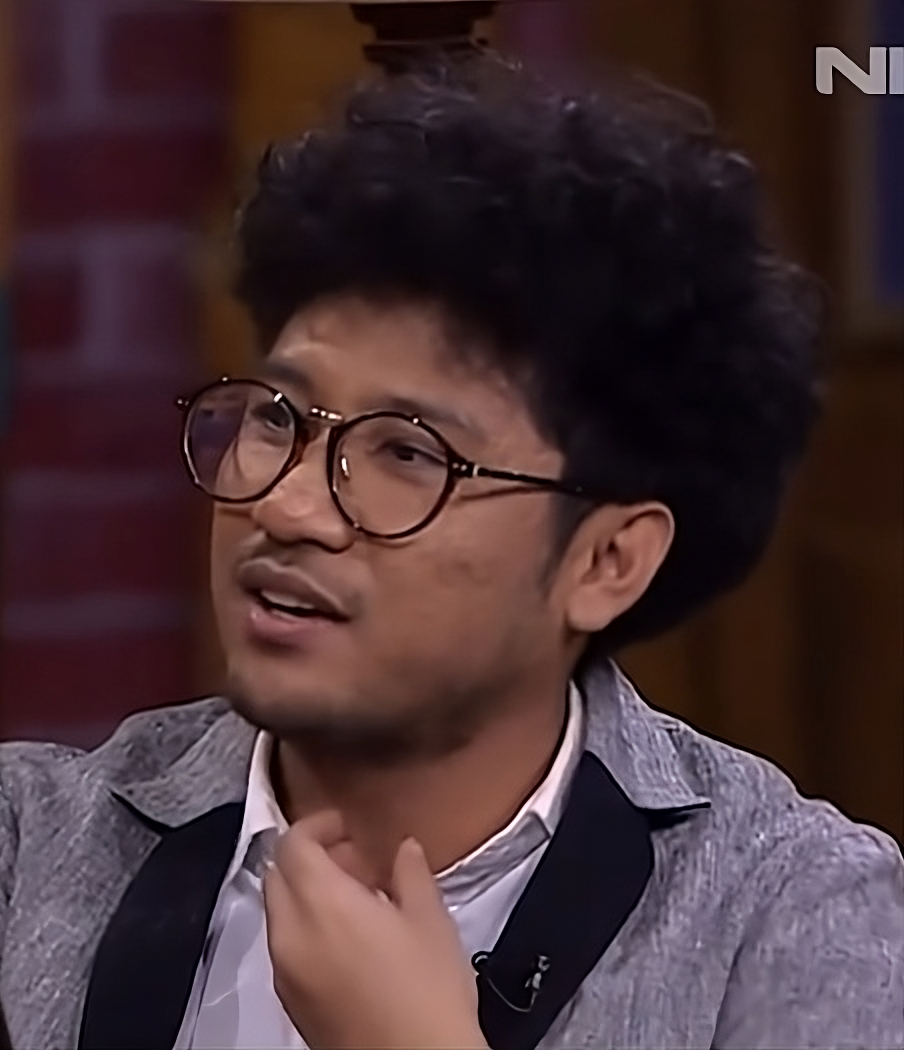
- Aji in 2017

Background information
- Born: Kunto Aji Wibisono; 4 January 1987 (age 39); Sleman, Special Region of Yogyakarta, Indonesia
- Genres: Pop, Senja
- Occupations: Singer; songwriter
- Instruments: Vocals; guitar
- Years active: 2008–present
- Labels: Rancang Rencana; Juni
- Spouse: Dewi Syariati (m. 2015)

Kunto Aji Wibisono (born 4 January 1987) is an Indonesian singer and songwriter. He took part in the fifth season of Indonesian Idol in 2008 and finished fourth.

He had his breakthrough after releasing his debut single, "Terlalu Lama Sendiri" in 2014, followed by his debut studio album Generation Y a year later.

== Career ==
In 2008, Aji began his musical career after finishing in fourth place in the fifth season of Indonesian Idol. Fifteen years later, he revealed in an interview that he got chosen to audition by the producers through a "special track" because he had previously served as the vocalist of his high school band. In 2010, he formed a boy band BoyzIIIBoys with fellow vocalists Teddy Adhitya, Adera, and Beboy. They gained recognition on YouTube after uploading videos of them singing covers.

Aji independently released his debut single, "Terlalu Lama Sendiri" in 2014. The single garnered regional recognition as it won Best Song – Indonesia at the 14th Anugerah Planet Muzik and Aji himself won the award for Best New Male Artist. He was also nominated for the Best New Artist at the 18th Annual Anugerah Musik Indonesia, but lost to Isyana Sarasvati. In April 2015, he released a second single "Pengingat", co-written by jazz musician Barry Likumahuwa. In November 2015, he released a third single titled "Ekspektasi" alongside a music video starring model Ayu Gani. His debut studio album Generation Y was released on 17 November 2015, which encapsulates the daily life of millennials and quarter-life crisis.

In 2017, Aji released the lead single of his upcoming studio album, "Konon Katanya", which explores the theme of choosing the right path in life. It marks his first release after signing a record contract with Juni Records which was co-founded by Raisa. On 14 September 2018, he released his sophomore album, Mantra Mantra, which delves into mental health issues, particularly focusing on overthinking, alongside "Topik Semalam" as its second single. The album was met with critical acclaim and accolades. It won the Album of the Year at the 2019 Anugerah Musik Indonesia. Fellow Indonesian singer Hindia cited the album as an inspiration for him to start working on his debut solo studio album, Menari dengan Bayangan which was released a year later. On 5 February 2019, "Rehat" was picked as the album's third single, alongside a compilation music video featuring fan submissions. "Pilu Membiru", a track which addressed about loss and grief, was picked as the album's final single on 13 November 2019. The music video, titled Pilu Membiru Experience, featured mindfulness practitioner Adjie Santosoputro and three fans who shared their tales of grief. The three stories were narrated by Najwa Shihab, Nadin Amizah, and Iqbaal Ramadhan. Pilu Membiru Experience was also released as an extended play on the same day.

Aji released a single in 2020, "Selaras" with singer Nadin Amizah as a partnership with IM3 Ooredoo. In 2022, he released a single titled "Salam Pada Rindu". On 31 August and 1 September 2023, Aji held intimate shows, Sowan Album III, to showcase his upcoming third studio albums. On 14 September 2023, he released his third studio album titled Pengantar Purifikasi Pikir. Aji held an early morning concert, URUP 2024, on 1 January 2024 at the Asram Edupark, Yogyakarta.

== Personal life ==
Aji married his girlfriend Dewi Syariati on 6 December 2015. Dewi gave birth to their son, Badha, in 2016. In 2023, the couple welcomed their second child, Migunani.

== Discography ==
=== Studio albums ===
- Generation Y (2015)
- Mantra Mantra (2018)
- Pengantar Purifikasi Pikir (2023)

=== Extended plays ===
- Pilu Membiru Experience (2019)

=== Singles ===
List of singles, showing year released and album name
Title	Year	Album
"Terlalu Lama Sendiri"	2015	Generation Y
"Pengingat"	2015	Generation Y
"Ekspektasi"	2015	Generation Y
"Akhir Bulan"	2016	Generation Y
"Mercusuar"	2017	Generation Y
"Konon Katanya"	2017	Mantra Mantra
"Topik Semalam"	2018	Mantra Mantra
"Rehat"	2019	Mantra Mantra
"Pilu Membiru"	2019	Mantra Mantra
"Selaras" (with Nadin Amizah)	2020	Non-album singles
"Salam Pada Rindu"	2022	Non-album singles
"Jangan Melamun Saat Hujan"	2023	Pengantar Purifikasi Pikir
"Hiduplah Sebelum Mati"	2024	Non-album single
