= Cita Citata =

Indonesian singer and actress

- Born: Cita Rahayu; 14 August 1994 (age 32); Bandung, West Java, Indonesia
- Occupations: Singer; actress
- Years active: 2014–present
- Musical career
- Genres: Dangdut (former), jazz, pop
- Instrument: Vocals
- Label: 45Movement

Cita Rahayu, stage name Cita Citata (born 14 August 1994), is an Indonesian singer and actress. Cita is known for her song "Sakitnya Tuh Disini" (The Pain is here in my heart) introduced in the soap opera Diam-Diam Suka: Cinta Lama Bersemi Kembali. The song won an award for "Most Famous Soap Opera Soundtrack" at the 2014 SCTV Awards. She has also played a role in a soap opera.

== Career ==
When she was young, Cita Citata often sang dangdut at wedding receptions with Gemilang Abdi Pratama. She began to sing pop in high school. Then, she began to sing jazz. She started her career as a jazz singer, but joined Sani Music Indonesia in mid 2014 as a dangdut singer. Her single "Kalimera Athena" was written by Doel Sumbang. Citata released the single "Sakitnya Tuh Disini" because of a breakup with Gemilang (familiarly called Shahmi). In a few weeks, the song topped various radio stations in Indonesia. Subsequently, she was earning an award for Best Contemporary Dangdut Female Solo Artist at the 18th Annual Anugerah Musik Indonesia

In addition, Cita has released her second single, "Goyang Dumang" and returned to reaching success, like her debut single. YouTube Rewind listed her music video for 2015 Most Popular Music Video, which was released by YouTube, occupied position No. 2. Soon after that, Cita was the No. 1 most requested artist on Google in Indonesia. Cita had released her EP album Sakitnya Tuh Disini and produced other singles, such as "Aku Mah Apa Atuh" and "Meriang".

== Discography ==
=== Studio albums ===
- Sakitnya Tuh Disini (2014)

=== Single ===
Year	Title	Album	Label
2014	"Kalimera Athena"	Sakitnya Tuh Disini	Sani Sentosa Abadi
2014	"Sakitnya Tuh Disini"	Sakitnya Tuh Disini	Sani Sentosa Abadi
2014	"Goyang Dumang"	Sakitnya Tuh Disini	Sani Sentosa Abadi
2014	"Perawan Atau Janda"	Sakitnya Tuh Disini	Sani Sentosa Abadi
2015	"Aku Mah Apa Atuh"	Sakitnya Tuh Disini	Sani Sentosa Abadi
2015	"Meriang (Merindukan Kasih Sayang)"	Sakitnya Tuh Disini	Sani Sentosa Abadi
2015	"Bersyukurlah"	Sakitnya Tuh Disini	Sani Sentosa Abadi
2015	"Penipu"	Sakitnya Tuh Disini	Sani Sentosa Abadi
2015	"Jamur (Janda Dibawah Umur)"	Sakitnya Tuh Disini	Sani Sentosa Abadi

== Filmography ==
=== Television ===
Year	Title	Role	Notes	Network
2014	Diam-Diam Suka: Cinta Lama Bersemi Kembali	Herself	Guest star	SCTV

=== Television film ===
Year	Title	Role	Notes
2014	Sakitnya Tuh Disini		Lead role

== Commercial ==
- Bintang Toedjoe Panas Dalam (2015; with Trio Ubur Ubur)
