= Love Story (2011 Indonesian film) =

- Theatrical Movie Poster
- Directed by: Hanny Saputra
- Written by: Armantono
- Produced by: Chand Parwez Servia
- Starring: Acha Septriasa; Irwansyah; Henidar Amroe; Reza Pahlevi; Maudy Koesnaedi; Donny Damara; Reza Rahadian; Ine Azri
- Cinematography: Regina Anindita
- Edited by: Bobby Barus
- Music by: Anto Hoed; Melly Goeslaw
- Production company: Starvision Plus
- Distributed by: Starvision Plus
- Release date: 21 January 2011
- Running time: 96 minutes
- Country: Indonesia
- Language: Indonesian

Love Story is a 2011 Indonesian drama film directed by Hanny Saputra. The film stars Acha Septriasa and Irwansyah.

== Plot ==
Ranti (Acha Septriasa) and Galih (Irwansyah) are childhood friends whose destitute, isolated villages are separated by a river. A local legend states that the river arose when Joko Angin-Angin fell in love with the Moon Goddess and, when they were unable to be together, stomped his feet and cracked the Earth. A related belief is that persons from the separated villages who fall in love are destined to bring doom and disaster to their village. Despite this, Ranti and Galih share feelings for each other, and after completing his university studies in Bandung Galih returns to the village to build a schoolhouse to help Ranti teach the village children.

Soon after Galih begins work on the schoolhouse, disaster strikes. One of the village boys is killed when he falls in the river, and Galih and Ranti's love is blamed. The villagers attempt to stop him from working on the schoolhouse as a measure to prevent disaster, first by knocking over the frame he has built then by killing Galih's horse and destroying his cart. Ranti, meanwhile, is beaten by her father and locked in a room in the house. Despite this, Galih continues working on the schoolhouse – even after he has fallen ill with typhus – and Ranti escapes, trying to help Galih.

When the building is nearly completed, Ranti tends to Galih and tries to convince him to rest so that his typhus can be cured. However, the villagers raze the schoolhouse to the ground. Galih continues to work, while Ranti continues to worry about him – despite her father becoming more and more severe. One day, when Ranti tries to return home after escaping again to take care of Galih, her father beats her into a coma.

When she awakens three days later, she rushes to the schoolhouse and finds it completed, with a water wheel to provide electricity. With the villagers, led by her father, coming to burn it to the ground again, Ranti looks for Galih and finds him collapsed on a pier. He tells her to connect the electrical cord from the water wheel to the schoolhouse and, when she does so, the lightbulb flashes on and gives pause to the would-be attackers. Galih dies of his typhus in Ranti's arms as she cries. Ultimately she is able to use the schoolhouse to teach. Her love story with Galih, meanwhile, is passed from generation to generation.

== Cast ==
- Acha Septriasa as Ranti
- Irwansyah as Galih
- Henidar Amroe as Ranti grandmother
- Reza Pahlevi as Ranti dad
- Maudy Koesnaedi as Galih's mom
- Donny Damara as Galih's dad
- Reza Rahadian as Pengkor

== Production ==
Love Story was based on the Indonesian folk tale of Joko Angin-angin and Dewi Bulan. It was directed by Hanny Saputra and filmed before Ramadhan 2010.

Acha Septriasa was cast for the role of Ranti, while her ex-boyfriend Irwansyah was chosen for the role of Galih. This is the third romance starring the two, after Heart and Love is Cinta; it is also expected to be the last. Although at first she worried that the chemistry between the two would be awkward, they were able to settle into a professional relationship; she later described their current status as being "like brothers". Irwansyah's then-girlfriend and later wife Zaskia Sungkar was onset at times, such as during a kissing scene mandated by the script.

== Themes ==
According to producer Chand Parwez, Love Story is a story of forbidden love, However, it does not touch on the theme of religious differences; instead, it is meant to show that love is worth fighting for. Saputra says that it is also a commentary on globalization, as Indonesia is seen as being at a crossroads, with some adhering closely to adat and others going with the "modern" lifestyle.

== Release and reception ==
Love Story received wide release on 27 January 2011, with Septriasa and Irwansyah also providing vocals for a soundtrack album. A review for 21 Cineplex noted that fans of Irwansyah and Septriasa's early collaborations would enjoy it.

== Notes ==
1. Original: "... seperti kakak-adik."
