= Journey of Love =

Journey of Love may refer to:

- Journey of Love (1994 TV series), with Marco Ngai
- The Journey of Love, 2008 album by Shireen and Zaskia Sungkar
- "The Journey of Love", 2009 hit single by Na Ying
- The Journey of Love, 2011 album by 7icons
- Journey of Love 18+, 2023 Indian Malayalam-language film
