= Virgin (2004 film) =

- Directed by: Hanny Saputra
- Screenplay by: Armantono
- Produced by: Chand Parvez Servia
- Starring: Laudya Cynthia Bella; Angie; Ardina Rasti; Uli Auliani; Mike Lucock; Unique Priscilla; Henidar Amroe; Ayu Azhari; Tio Pakusadewo
- Cinematography: Tommy Jepang
- Edited by: Wawan I. Wibowo
- Music by: Indra Qadarsih
- Production company: Starvision Plus
- Distributed by: Starvision Plus
- Release date: November 11, 2004
- Running time: 105 minutes
- Country: Indonesia
- Language: Indonesia

Virgin: When Virginity is Questioned (Indonesian: Virgin: Ketika Keperawanan Dipertanyakan) is a 2004 Indonesian film, written by Armantono, directed by Hanny R. Saputra and produced by Starvision Plus. The film examines the struggle between sexuality and morality in modern Indonesia. It stars Laudya Cynthia Bella, Ardina Rasti and Angie. Released on 11 November 2004, the film achieved domestic ticket sales of 1.1 million and was later adapted into a television series of the same name.

== Plot ==
Sixteen-year-old schoolgirl Biyan (Laudya Cynthia Bella) wants to be a writer and is determined to remain a virgin until marriage. Her determination is reinforced by the womanizing of her father, which has affected her mother (Henidar Amroe).

Biyan hangs out with her schoolfriends Stella (Ardina Rasti) and Ketie (Angie Virgin). They belong to a group of materialistic teens who view virginity as old-fashioned and are not afraid to experiment with alcohol. Stella wants to get into acting but is tricked into appearing in a soft-core porn film, while Ketie prostitutes herself to older men in order to purchase consumer goods. Biyan attends an auction for the right to sleep with her idol, Merix. After Biyan outbids a gay man, Merix confides that he has never slept with a woman because he is embarrassed about his small penis.

== Reception ==
Because the film contains nightlife and promiscuity, it was pulled from distribution in Makassar.

== Awards and Festivals ==
1. Antemas Award Indonesia Film Festival 2005 as most Box Office

2. Best Art Director Indonesia Film Festival 2005

3. Moscow Film Festival 2005 - Invitation at Russian Audience official non-competition MIFF 2005

4. Film Nominated at Tokyo International Film Festival 2005 Wind of Asia

5. Best Actress Bandung Film Festival 2005: Laudya Cynthia Bella

6. Most Favorite Rising Star — MTV Indonesia Movie Awards 2005: Laudya Cynthia Bella

7. Best Cinematography Bandung Film Festival 2005 (Tommy Jepang)

8. Nominated Best Soundtrack Bali International Film Festival 2005

9. The first Indonesian movie released in India

== Sequel ==
A sequel, titled Virgin 2, was released on May 28, 2009.

== See also ==
- Senandung Masa Puber
- The Sexy City
