= Zaskia =

Zaskia is a given name. Notable people with the given name include:

- Zaskia Adya Mecca (born 1987), Indonesian actress
- Zaskia Sungkar (born 1990), Indonesian actress
