= Hafalan Shalat Delisa =

2011 Indonesian drama film

- Directed by: Sony Gaokasak
- Written by: Armantono
- Based on: Hafalan Shalat Delisa by Tere Liye
- Produced by: Chand Parwez Servia
- Starring: Nirina Zubir; Reza Rahadian; Chantiq Schagerl; Al Fathir Muchtar; Mike Lewis; Loide Christina Teixeira; Ghina Salsabila; Reska Tania Apriadi; Riska Tania Apriadi
- Distributed by: Starvision Plus
- Release date: December 22, 2011
- Running time: 150 minutes
- Country: Indonesia
- Languages: Indonesian; English

Hafalan Shalat Delisa (lit. 'Delisa's Salah Recitation') is an Indonesian drama film released on 22 December 2011. Directed by Sony Gaokasak and starring Nirina Zubir and Reza Rahadian, the film is based on the best-selling fiction novel by Tere Liye with the same title, which is in turn based on the 2004 Indian Ocean earthquake and tsunami. The film was shot in Aceh.

== Plot ==
Delisa (Chantiq Schagerl) is a girl from Lhok Nga, a small coastal village in Aceh. She is the youngest daughter of Abi Usman (Reza Rahadian), who works on a tanker ship for an international oil company. Delisa lives with her mother, whom she calls Ummi (Nirina Zubir), and her three sisters: Fatima (Ghina Salsabila) and twins Aisyah (Reska Tania Apriadi) and Zahra (Riska Tania Apriadi).

On 26 December 2004, Delisa is at her school practising for a prayer exam when an earthquake occurs, causing a tsunami which floods their village and carries Delisa away. She is rescued several days later by Smith (Mike Lewis), a U.S. Army soldier who became a volunteer. Her right leg was later amputated due to severe injuries, and her suffering attracted more people's compassion. Smith considers adopting her before Abi Usman reunites with Delisa. She hears that her three sisters died in the tsunami, while Ummi's status is unknown.

Delisa rose, amid the grief and loss, in the midst of despair that plagued Abi Usman and other Acehnese people, sharing laughter at each attendance. Although heavy, Delisa has been taught how grief can be a force to stay afloat. Although it seems she did not want the tears to stop flowing, Delisa is trying to understand whether what she is doing is sincere, doing something without expecting a reply.
