= Tere Liye (writer) =

Indonesian writer (born 1979)

- Darwis
- Born: Darwin; 21 May 1979 (age 47); Lahat Regency, South Sumatra, Indonesia
- Education: University of Indonesia
- Occupation: Writer
- Writing career
- Pen name: Tere Liye
- Language: Indonesian
- Years active: 2005–present
- Notable works: Hafalan Sholat Delisa, Bumi, Tentang Kamu, Teruslah Bodoh Jangan Pintar
- Notable awards: IKAPI Award 2016 Writer of the year Islamic Book Award 2017 Best Adult Fiction Islamic Books

Darwis (born 21 May 1979), better known as his pen name Tere Liye is an Indonesian writer and former accountant. Making his writing debut in 2005 through the novel Hafalan Sholat Delisa, he has published more than 40 books throughout his writing career.

== Early life and education ==
Darwis was born in Lahat Regency, South Sumatra. He is the sixth of seven children, from the couple Pasai and Nursam. Both of his parents are farmers. Darwis spent much of his childhood in his hometown. Darwis received his basic education at SD Negeri Kikim Timur 2, East Kikim District. Then, Darwis continued to secondary level education at SMP Negeri 2 Kikim which is also located in the Lahat Regency area. After entering high school, Darwis followed his parents as they immigrated to Java to continue his education at SMA Negeri 9 Bandar Lampung, Lampung Province. Darwis got the idea of the name 'Tere Liye' from an Indian movie, the name Tere Liye translates to the meaning "for you, for friends, for friends, brothers, sisters, mothers, fathers and neighbors but above all only for you".

Before garnering popularity and success as a writer, Darwis had pursued the highest education possible at the prestigious and litigious University of Indonesia (UI). Even though Darwin is now closely associated to the world of literature in Indonesia, he first graduated from the Accounting Department, UI Faculty of Economics and Business.

== Career ==
After completing his studies, Darwis did not work in a company that was related to literature or writing. Darwis initially worked as an accountant at a company. After an interview with Darwis, it turns out that his writing skills were born from hobbies and habits. Some of his works that have been adapted for the big screen are Hafalan Shalat Delisa, Bidadari-Bidadari Surga, Moga Bunda Disayang Allah, and Rembulan Tenggelam di Wajahmu.

Darwis stopped publishing his books in physical form from 1 July to 31 December 2017 due to the high book tax and royalties for authors. Darwis admitted on social media that he was disappointed with the taxation system in Indonesia which he considered was not in favor of authors, and even seemed to be detrimental to authors, Minister of Finance, Sri Mulyani Indrawati, who claimed to be a book fan herself admitted that she was stunned to learn that the writer decided to stop writing books because of tax issues. Sri Mulyani said that writers tax policies cannot simply be changed, and there are some tax regulations that can be changed quickly, but there are also those that require a longer process. For example, the issue of Income Tax (PPh) rates and individual Income Tax rates cannot be changed quickly by the Minister of Finance or the Director General of Taxes. This is because the tariff issue is stated in the Taxation Law (UU). Therefore, it must go through the approval of the House of Representatives (DPR).

== Bibliography ==
=== Serial Novels ===
==== Parallel World Series ====
- Bumi - 2014
- Bulan - 2015
- Matahari - 2016
- Bintang - 2017
- Ceros dan Bantozar - 2018
- Komet - 2018
- Komet Minor - 2019
- Selena - 2020
- Nebula - 2020
- Si Putih - 2021
- Lumpu - 2021
- Matahari Minor - 2022
- Bibi Gill - 2022
- SagaraS - 2022
- Ily - 2023
- Aldebaran part 1 - 2024
- Hana-Tara-Hata - 2025

==== Nusantara Kids Series ====
Previously, this series was called "Anak-Anak Mamak" series and consisted of four books, which were:

- Burlian - 2009
- Pukat - 2010
- Eliana - 2011
- Amelia - 2013

Then in 2018, Tere Liye re-released the book with a new title and changed the name of the series to "Anak Nusantara".

- Si Anak Spesial - 2018 (Previously Burlian)
- Si Anak Pintar - 2018 (Previously Pukat)
- Si Anak Pemberani - 2018 (Previously Eliana)
- Si Anak Kuat - 2018 (Previously Amelia)
- Si Anak Cahaya - 2018
- Si Anak Badai - 2019
- Si Anak Pelangi - 2021
- Si Anak Savana - 2022

==== Action Series ====
- Negeri Para Bedebah - 2012
- Negeri di Ujung Tanduk - 2013
- Pulang - 2015
- Pergi - 2018
- Pulang Pergi - 2021
- Bedebah di Ujung Tanduk - 2021
- Tanah Para Bandit - 2023
- Bandit-Bandit Berkelas - 2024

==== The Gogons Series ====
- The Gogons: James & The Incredible Incidents - 2016
- The Gogons 2: Dito & Prison of Love - 2020 (No Physical Copy)

=== Non-Interconnected Novels ===
- Hafalan Sholat Delisa - 2005
- Moga Bunda Disayang Allah - 2006
- Harga Sebuah Percaya - 2018 (Previously Kisah Sang Penandai - 2006)
- Dia Adalah Kakakku - 2018 (Previously Bidadari-Bidadari Surga - 2008)
- Sunset Bersama Rosie - 2008
- Rembulan Tenggelam di Wajahmu - 2009
- Daun yang Jatuh Tak Pernah Membenci Angin - 2010
- Ayahku (Bukan) Pembohong - 2011
- Kau, Aku dan Sepucuk Angpau Merah - 2012
- Rindu - 2014
- Tentang Kamu - 2016
- Hujan - 2016
- Selamat Tinggal - 2020
- Janji - 2021
- Rasa - 2022
- Sesuk - 2022
- Hello - 2023
- Yang Telah Lama Pergi - 2023
- Teruslah Bodoh Jangan Pintar - 2024
- Sendiri - 2024
- Sebelas - 2025
- Cinta Antara Jakarta & Kuala Lumpur - 2025
- Sang Eksekutor - 2026
- Pareidolia - 2026

=== Short stories ===
- Berjuta Rasanya - 2012
- Sepotong Hati yang Baru - 2012

=== Quote Collections ===
- #AboutLove - 2016
- #AboutFriends - 2017
- #AboutLife - 2018

=== Poetry ===
- Dikatakan atau Tidak Dikatakan, Itu Tetap Cinta - 2014
- Sungguh Kau Boleh Pergi - 2019

=== Kids Colouring Book ===
- Toki: Si Kelinci Bertopi - 2021
- Suku Penunggang Layang-Layang - 2021
- Malam yang Menegangkan - 2021
- Apel Emas - 2021

=== Films ===
- Hafalan Sholat Delisa - 2011 - Scriptwriter
- Bidadari-Bidadari Surga - 2013 - Scriptwriter
- Moga Bunda Disayangi Allah - 2013 - Scriptwriter
- Rembulan Tenggelam di Wajahmu - 2019 - Scriptwriter
