= Hanny Saputra =

Indonesian director (born 1965)

Hanny R. Saputra
- Born: 11 May 1965 (age 61); Salatiga, Central Java, Indonesia
- Education: Jakarta Art Institute
- Occupation: Director
- Years active: 1997–present
- Notable work: Heart; Di Bawah Lindungan Kabah

Hanny R. Saputra (born 11 May 1965) is an Indonesian director. One of his films, Under the Protection of Ka'Bah, was Indonesia's submission for the Academy Award for Best Foreign Language Film in the 84th Academy Awards.

== Biography ==
Saputra was born in Salatiga, Central Java, on 11 May 1965. As a child he enjoyed watching movies, and in 1985 he enrolled in the Jakarta Art Institute to learn filmmaking.

In 1997 he made his directorial debut with the television film Sepanjang Jalan Kenangan (Along Memory Lane), which was not picked up by any stations as it was considered too idealistic. He released his first feature film, Tato, in 2002. After input from senior filmmakers Leo Sutanto and Lo Fen Koei, he began to focus more on commercially viable films, releasing Virgin two years later.

After Virgin, Saputra directed the 2006 hit Heart starring Acha Septriasa and Irwansyah; this was followed by another film starring the couple, Love is Cinta, the following year. Saputra subsequently directed Septriasa twice more.

Saputra was approached to direct the 2011 religious drama Di Bawah Lindungan Ka'bah (Under the Protection of Ka'Bah, based on the novel by Hamka) after its previous director left the project. He used considerable dramatic license in the adaption, to the point Makbul Mubarak of The Jakarta Post commented that he seemed to have only used the opening and closing of the source material. The film was Indonesia's submission to the 84th Academy Awards, but it did not make the final shortlist. As of August 2011, Saputra has directed 10 films.

== Awards and recognition ==
Rizal Iwan, writing for The Jakarta Post, calls Saputra "a seriously gifted filmmaker, who is somehow constantly stuck with bad scripts".

Sepanjang Jalan Kenangan received 8 Vidia Awards and was selected as Best Film the Indonesian Sinetron Festival.

== Filmography ==
- Virgin (2004)
- Mirror (2005)
- Heart (2006)
- Love is Cinta (2007)
- Sst... Jadikan Aku Simpanan (Sst... Make Me Your Mistress; 2010)
- Sweetheart (2010)
- Love Story (2011)
- Milli & Nathan (2011)
- Di Bawah Lindungan Kabah (Under the Protection of Ka'Bah; 2011)
- 12 Menit Kemenangan Untuk selamanya (2014)

== Awards and nominations ==
Year	Award	Category	Recipients	Result
2005	Indonesian Film Festival	Citra Award for Best Director	Virgin	Nominated
2006	Indonesian Film Festival	Citra Award for Best Director	Heart	Nominated
