= Cinta Fitri =

Indonesian television series

- Genre: Melodrama
- Created by: Manoj Punjabi
- Written by: Sabrina Firdaus (Season 1); Hilman Hariwijaya (Seasons 2-3); Lintang Wardani (Seasons 4-7); Nishikant Roy(Seasons 4-7); MD Entertainment (Season 7)
- Directed by: Haji Encep Masduki
- Creative directors: Karan Mahtani, Saurabh George Swamy, Eni Hawari, Vishal Lakhiani, Bhavishya R Mehta
- Starring: Shireen Sungkar; Teuku Wisnu; Adly Fairuz; Donita; Verlita Evelyn; Iqbal Pakula; Dinda Kanyadewi; Sandy Syarief; Nuri Maulida; Lian Firman; Irene Librawati; Meidiana Hutomo; Omaswati; Fanny Ghassani; Marsha Aruan; Rama Michael; Mike Lewis; Ersya Aurelia; Teuku Ryan; Boy Tirayoh; Jonathan Frizzy; Windy Wulandari; Shandy Syarif; Suheil Fahmi Bisyir
- Opening theme: Atas Nama Cinta by Rossa (season 1 to season 5 episode 38); Cinta Kita by Shireen Sungkar ft. Teuku Wisnu (season 5 episode 39 to season 7)
- Ending theme: same as opening
- Country of origin: Indonesia
- Original language: Indonesian
- No. of seasons: 7
- No. of episodes: 1,002

Production
- Producers: Dhamoo Punjabi; Manoj Punjabi
- Production location: Jakarta
- Running time: 120 minutes, 1 hours (Seasons 1-6); 60 minutes, 1 hours (Season 7)
- Production company: MD Entertainment

Original release
- Network: SCTV (season 1-6); Indosiar (season 7); MDTV
- Release: April 2, 2007 – May 8, 2011

Cinta Fitri (Fitri's Love) is an Indonesian soap opera television series. Spanning 7 seasons and 1,002 episodes, it was produced by MD Entertainment headed by Manoj Punjabi and Dhamoo Punjabi. It aired at 20:30 on SCTV from 2 April 2007 until 28 November 2010. The show moved to Indosiar on 11 January 2011 and aired until 8 May 2011. This series gained high viewership, both domestic and overseas (Singapore, Malaysia and Brunei).

== Cast ==
- Shireen Sungkar as Fitri Rahayu
- Teuku Wisnu as Farrel Emeraldy Hutama
- Adly Fairuz as Aldiansyah Armando (Aldo)
- Donita as Amadea Moza
- Dinda Kanyadewi as Mischa Almaira
- Louise Anastasya as Sita
- Shandy Syarif as Faiz Hutama
- Verlita Evelyn as Maya Safira Hutama
- Iqbal Pakula as Bramantyo (Bram)
- Nuri Maulida as Kayla Saphira Hutama
- Lian Firman as Hadinoto (Hadi)
- Dea Lestari as Rita
- Irene Librawati as Amelia Emeraldi (Lia)
- Ochie Anggraini as Pinkan
- Meidiana Hutomo as Lik Rini
- Ayu Dyah Pasha as Asifa Handayani
- Sylvia Fully as Rita young character
- Rama Michael as Ferdi
- Ersya Aurelia as Fika
- Bemby Putuanda as Normansyah Armando
- Elsye Virgita as Salsabilla Virgita (Seasons 2 - Seasons 3, Seasons 7)
- Shenny Andrea as Sherly (Season 1 - Seasons 7)
- Windy Wulandari as Senny (Seasons 4 - Seasons 6, Seasons 7)
- Arthur Tobing as Iman Sarifudin
- Bobby Rakhman as Cecep
- Djalu as Koko Witjarnako
- Hendrik Beta as Beta (Seasons 6)
- Celia Nadia Agatha Thomas as Nadine adult character (Seasons 7)
- Cahya Rizky Zaputra as Raffa adult character (Seasons 7)
- Wesley Andrew as Rifky adult character (Seasons 7)
- Gaxel Anyndra Shanie as Aliza adult character (Seasons 7)
- Didit Aditya as Alif adult character (Seasons 7)
- Suheil Fahmi Bisyir as Arya adult character (Seasons 7)
- Rio Bhaskara as Yuga Antachena adult character (Seasons 7)
- Marsha Aruan as Abel adult character (Seasons 7)
- Akri Patrio as Babe Marzuki (Seasons 7)
- Omaswati as Enyak Marzuki (Seasons 7)
- Raffa Nemaja as Raffa Emeraldi Hutama child character (Seasons 4 - Seasons 7)
- Anbo Ontocheno as Yuga Antachena child character (Seasons 1 - Seasons 7)
- Angelina Quartiana as Abel child character (Seasons 2 - Seasons 7)
- Chilla Irawan as Nadine child character (Seasons 1 - Seasons 3, Seasons 5, Seasons 7)
- Fabian as Alif child character (Seasons 1 - Seasons 7)
- Hans Joshua as Anwar (Seasons 6)
- Lyra Virna as Mariska (Seasons 6)
- Teuku Ryan as Hartawan Kusumah (Seasons 4 - Seasons 6)
- Rini Yulianti as Joana (Seasons 6)
- Yoppie Beda as Herman (Seasons 6)
- Addy Irwandi as Giman (Seasons 6)
- Ferdi Ali as Randy (Seasons 6)
- Ida Kusumah as Titi Irmawati Binti Atamadi Kusumah (Oma) (Seasons 1 - Seasons 6)
- Boy Tirayoh as Hutama Erlangga (Seasons 1 - Seasons 3, Seasons 7 episodes 105)
- El Manik as Handoko Erlangga (Seasons 5 - Seasons 6)
- Randy Pangalila as Tristan (Seasons 1, Seasons 3 - Seasons 4)
- Silvana Herman as Doli Astria (Seasons 4)
- Rizky Hanggono as Firmansyah Armando (Seasons 1)
- Metha Yunatria as Nabila (Seasons 1)
- Fanny Ghassani as Kayla Saphira Hutama first character (Seasons 1 - Seasons 2)
- Debby Cynthia Dewi as Asih (Seasons 1 - Seasons 4)
- Revand Narya as Fathan (Yadi) (Seasons 5)
- Jonathan Frizzy as Hendry (Erwin) (Seasons 5)
- Ajeng Kartika as Diana Bhakti (Seasons 4)
- Nurul Hidayati as Dinita (Seasons 3 - Seasons 4)
- Restu Sinaga as Binsar (Seasons 5)
- Indah Ayu Putri as Angel Subrata (Seasons 5 - Seasons 6)
- Afdhal Yusman (Seasons 5)
- Marizcha Fayn as Jamilah (Seasons 3)
- Andrew Andika as Vino (Seasons 2)
- Mario Tanzala as Pram (Season 5)
- Indah Permatasari as Maya Safira Hutama child character
- Mike Lewis as Edo (Seasons 1 - Seasons 2)
- Detri Warmanto as Antok (Seasons 1) & Dika (Seasons 7)
- Aris Kurniawan as Irfan / Owner of PT. Ered (Season 4)

== International broadcasts ==
Country	Series Programmes	Series Seasons Programmes	Television channel	Television network	Series premiere	Series end	Status	Available
Indonesia	Cinta Fitri (Indonesia)	Cinta Fitri 1-6	SCTV (subsidiary of Surya Citra Media)	Salim Group (subsidiary of Elang Mahkota Teknologi)	April 2, 2007	November 28, 2010	Live	National
Indonesia	Cinta Fitri (Indonesia)	Cinta Fitri 7	Indosiar (subsidiary of Cakrawala Indosiar Karya Media)	Salim Group (subsidiary of Elang Mahkota Teknologi)	January 12, 2011	May 8, 2011	Live	National
Indonesia	Cinta Fitri (Indonesia)	Cinta Fitri 1	MNCTV	Media Nusantara Citra (subsidiary of Global Mediacom)	January 1, 2012	March 31, 2012	Rerun	National
Indonesia	Cinta Fitri (Indonesia)	Cinta Fitri 2	RCTI & MNC International	Media Nusantara Citra (subsidiary of Global Mediacom)	April 1, 2012	August 18, 2012	Rerun	National
Indonesia	Cinta Fitri (Indonesia)	Cinta Fitri 5-7	RCTI & MNC International	Media Nusantara Citra (subsidiary of Global Mediacom)	September 19, 2012	December 31, 2012	Rerun	National
Indonesia	Cinta Fitri (Indonesia)	Cinta Fitri 3	Global TV	Media Nusantara Citra (subsidiary of Global Mediacom)	April 1, 2012	August 18, 2012	Rerun	National
Indonesia	Cinta Fitri (Indonesia)	Cinta Fitri 4	SINDOtv	Media Nusantara Citra (subsidiary of Global Mediacom)	April 1, 2012	August 18, 2012	Rerun	National
Indonesia	Cinta Fitri (Indonesia)	Cinta Fitri 1–4 (for now)	MDTV	MDTV Media Technologies	November 11, 2024	TBA	Rerun	National
Malaysia	Cinta Fitri (Malaysia)	Cinta Fitri 1	TV9	Sistem Televisyen Malaysia Berhad (subsidiary of Media Prima Berhad)	May 9, 2011	December 31, 2011	Rerun	International
Malaysia	Cinta Fitri (Malaysia)	Cinta Fitri 2	TV3	Sistem Televisyen Malaysia Berhad (subsidiary of Media Prima Berhad)	April 1, 2012	September 18, 2012	Rerun	International
Malaysia	Cinta Fitri (Malaysia)	Cinta Fitri 5-7	TV3	Sistem Televisyen Malaysia Berhad (subsidiary of Media Prima Berhad)	September 19, 2012	December 31, 2012	Rerun	International
Malaysia	Cinta Fitri (Malaysia)	Cinta Fitri 3	Astro Prima & Astro Ria	Astro (subsidiary of Astro Holdings Sdn Bhd)	October 1, 2012	December 31, 2012	Rerun	International
Malaysia	Cinta Fitri (Malaysia)	Cinta Fitri 4	Astro Pelangi & Astro Bintang	Astro (subsidiary of Astro Holdings Sdn Bhd)	October 1, 2012	December 31, 2012	Rerun	International
Singapore	Cinta Fitri (Singapore)	Cinta Fitri 1	MediaCorp TV12 Suria	MediaCorp TV12 (subsidiary of MediaCorp)	January 1, 2008	August 7, 2008	Rerun	International
Singapore	Cinta Fitri (Singapore)	Cinta Fitri 2	MediaCorp TV Channel 5 & MediaCorp TV HD5	MediaCorp TV (subsidiary of MediaCorp)	April 1, 2012	September 18, 2012	Rerun	International
Singapore	Cinta Fitri (Singapore)	Cinta Fitri 5-7	MediaCorp TV Channel 5 & MediaCorp TV HD5	MediaCorp TV (subsidiary of MediaCorp)	September 19, 2012	December 31, 2012	Rerun	International
Singapore	Cinta Fitri (Singapore)	Cinta Fitri 3	Sensasi	StarHub TV (subsidiary of StarHub)	January 1, 2010	July 9, 2010	Rerun	International
Singapore	Cinta Fitri (Singapore)	Cinta Fitri 4	Astro Aruna	mio TV (subsidiary of SingTel)	August 11, 2010	November 28, 2010	Rerun	International
Brunei	Cinta Fitri (Brunei)	Cinta Fitri 1	RTB1 National (News)	Radio Televisyen Brunei	April 2, 2007	November 5, 2007	Rerun	International
Brunei	Cinta Fitri (Brunei)	Cinta Fitri 2	RTB4 International (Satellite)	Radio Televisyen Brunei	August 8, 2008	August 23, 2008	Rerun	International
Brunei	Cinta Fitri (Brunei)	Cinta Fitri 5-7	RTB4 International (Satellite)	Radio Televisyen Brunei	January 11, 2010	May 8, 2011	Rerun	International
Brunei	Cinta Fitri (Brunei)	Cinta Fitri 3	RTB2 National (Entertainment)	Radio Televisyen Brunei	November 12, 2008	April 12, 2009	Rerun	International
Brunei	Cinta Fitri (Brunei)	Cinta Fitri 4	RTB2 National (Entertainment)	Radio Televisyen Brunei	July 20, 2009	November 15, 2009	Rerun	International

== Synopsis ==
=== Season 1 ===
Fitri is a countryside girl who is naive, old-fashioned, cheerful, kind-hearted and far from being judgemental towards others. She came from a place called Wonogiri and lived with her aunt, as her parents had long died. She had a relationship with a man named Firman, a man who came from Jakarta, the capital city of Indonesia.

As her wedding with Firman was drawing near, Fitri came to Jakarta to meet Firman's family. But as soon as she arrives in Jakarta, she is informed about Firman's death. So instead of attending her own wedding, she attends her fiancé's funeral. But that didn't deter Fitri. Fitri decided to stay in Jakarta, but she told Firman's family that she's going back to her village.

Fitri is shy, which was why she didn't tell Firman's family the truth. The other reason why she chooses to stay in Jakarta is to not let down her aunt. As if Fitri was blessed with unluckiness, her wallet was stolen at the bus station when she was wondering where to go next.

Fortunately, Fitri is hired at a Soto and Rice food stall owned by Maya, a woman who was kicked out by her own father, Mr. Hutama, a very successful and wealthy businessman. The main reason was for marrying Bram, a man who was poor but hardworking who was not acknowledged by his father.

Moza is the daughter of Mr. Hutama's late best friend. Because of this, Mr. Hutama is hoping to see his son, Farrel, marry Moza someday. Farrel himself is not up for another relationship especially after the departure of his ex-girlfriend, Mischa, to study abroad. Farrel then met Fitri. After various incidents, the relationship between Farrel and Fitri slowly building, but the jealous and scheming Moza kept on disrupting the relationship between the two. Hence, Farrel must choose between Fitri or his family business.

Farrel convinced Moza there's nothing between him and Fitri. But just when everything started to cool down, Mischa returned. Farrel then again was forced to choose between these two women. Alas, Farrel chose to be with Fitri instead. They became one of the most enviable couples for those around.

=== Season 2 ===
After Fitri fell at a bridge in Wonogiri, Farrel and their family panicked. Bulik Rini was also agitated, but luckily Fitri was safe and was found by some villagers. The wedding party was held with joy. Since they lived together, conflict between in-laws automatically appeared. Grandma repeatedly provoked Lia, as a result, Fitri and Lia often has conflicts. Aldo and Kayla's conflict also heated up, Aldo was assumed too busy taking care of his parents and Norman. The household life of Maya and Bram was also a dead end. Their decision of working together in one office, at Emil's property agency, became a boomerang. At the moment, Maya and Bram kept their husband and wife status a secret. And Emil not knowingly, ends up liking Maya.

Moza also has a story. Vino who is prideful, is the new working partner at Retro, this makes Moza irritated. Vino's cynical attitude towards women is caused by his past of bad experiences with romance. They often quarrel. Many people thought Vino will end up with Moza. Fate says differently. Moza is destined to be with Aldo. Norman and Yuga had rented a house. Yuga was happy to again meet Nabila, who is now a teacher in the school.

=== Season 3 ===
While Fitri became pregnant, Farrel was jailed accused of murdering Bram. Hutama and Lia are shocked, but not Maya, who filed for this case. Alas, Farrel was free; however Mischa provoked Maya to get inheritance from Hutama using Alif as an excuse. Maya succeeded in her provocation and she took over her father's wealth. This made Hutama, Lia, and Oma even unhappier. They moved to Fitri and Farrel's rented house and were pleased there. Unexpectedly, Kayla got into a coma donating her bone marrow for Finza. Hadi changed towards Aldo and Moza who were then married. A cold war between them was unavoidable.

Several episodes later, when Hadi, Kayla and Finza were in front of their yard, Hadi and Finza were playing ball. But unfortunately the ball rolled and was followed by Finza until it finally fell into the swimming pool. Then Finza was taken to the hospital, this incident made Hutama and Mr. Iman's family hysterical when they heard this news. Aldo was also very angry and blamed Hadi because he felt that Hadi did not give custody of Finza to Aldo, which shocked Farrel and Kayla. And until some time later Finza died, and Aldo & Hadi's fight could not be separated even on the 3rd night of the tahlilan that day.

One day, Fitri was shocked to see Bram in a public place. Everyone thought that Fitri was hallucinating. Mischa found a new partner through Bram's disappearance to attack Fitri and Farrel's happiness, Faiz, and claimed to be Hutama's only true so, not Farrel. Hutama's entire family was in shock.

Until one day, Bram discussed the secrets of the entire Hutama family, such as Bram's fake death and Faiz not being the biological child of Mr. Hutama and Mrs. Lia. But this was secretly known by Mr. Hutama itself until he finally brought them to Retro, but unfortunately at that time he was suffering from heart disease until it relapsed when he fainted in his office, so Mr. Hutama called Farrel to convey his last message that he was his biological child, until Mr. Hutama died. This make entire of Hutama family (except Oma, Kayla, and Hadi) not acknowledge the existence of Fitri and Farrel again.

Several days after the burial of Mr. Hutama's, the will was issued for all of the Hutama family. Initially, Farrel and Fitri's family refused to receive Mr. Hutama's assets and inheritance, but after being persuaded by Kayla and Oma, they finally agreed. This shocked the Hutama family. Not long after that, when Mischa & Faiz discovered record CCTV of Hutama’s death, they re-edited the video record of the death of Hutama belongs to Bram that entered Hutama’s room and kill him. But in real Bram was to take 200 million rupiah in cash box to gave a money to the person who helped him when he faked his death, Rakiman. This is where the lie of Bram’s death revealed, this made Fitri & Farrel punch both Bram & Mischa and retaliate by putting Bram in prison.

After several episodes, finally Faiz's true attitude towards Mrs. Lia was revealed, for example Retro's unstable performance and his finances were taken by Faiz and Mischa just because of his wealth, and make Oma was thrown out of Hutama Mansion and visits Fitri and Farrel's rented house. This is made Mrs. Lia accepted Farrel as her son even though it's not her biological child ( until Season 4 last Episode ). However, at that time Fitri was giving birth to her first child and named " Raffa Emeraldi Hutama ", makes Mrs. Lia ask them to back go home to Hutama Mansion.

=== Season 4, Ramadhan 1 ===
Through the hardest and longest struggle, Farrel and Fitri's son was delivered safely. Farrel asks Mrs. Lia to name their son because Mrs. Lia is his most beloved and respected mother. Mrs. Lia was overwhelmed with the given honour, she named Farrel and Fitri's son, Raffa Emeraldi Hutama.

Mrs. Lia reminds Farrel of Mr. Hutama's last wishes before he died, to protect his family and the company, Retro, from anything and anyone. Farrel and Fitri are in no position to refuse this. Mischa and Faiz were surprised to see the return of Farrel, Fitri, and Oma. Moreover, Mrs. Lia asks Farrel to return to work at Retro.

In the meantime, Bram managed to obtain the CCTV master video and witnessed how Mr. Hutama died that saved in Faiz's insurance agent. Bram has always been looked down by Mischa and Faiz. So when he found it was them who killed Mr. Hutama, Bram selfishly uses the opportunity to threaten both to get what he wants instead of handing them to the authorities.

Tristan kidnaps Moza from Aldo while they were on a holiday in a villa. Aldo had searched for Moza everywhere but he still could not find her for a while. When Aldo had found Moza, she had already become Tristan's wife.

So how will Farrel and Fitri know and finally get Mischa and Faiz to confess that they killed Mr. Hutama? Well because previously Maya was fooled by Bram's safety box in their bedroom. Then the next day Maya watched a CCTV recording DVD which showed that Faiz and Mischa were in Mr. Hutama's room, not long after Bram was shocked and chased Maya, but unfortunately Maya was hit by a car so the DVD was not seen again.

Maya experienced severe bleeding and it clearly affected her brain. After Maya was in therapy, Maya regained consciousness and still wanted to complain to Farrel about the recording of her father's murder. And finally on Eid al-Fitr, Faiz was willing to admit his mistake that he was the one who killed Mr. Hutama, but this devastated Lia and even told Faiz and Mischa to leave the Hutama family house, and Faiz and Farrel then quarreled.

Several episodes later, Mischa meets a widow, and also a prostitute named Dolly. Then Mischa paid Dolly to act as Farrel's "biological mother" to admit that he had once left a baby in his care for Dinita. But unfortunately, when Fitri and Hartawan tested Dolly's DNA, Farrel finally learned of it and Dolly fled from Hutama's mansion. Not long after, Fitri saw that Maya, Bu Lik, and Hutama's maid were lying on the floor and Raffa was kidnapped for the first time. Raffa was finally found by Faiz for help with a brother and sister named Surya and Sari.

=== Season 5 ===
Lia and Dinita are trapped under the debris of the hotel after an earthquake rocks Yogyakarta. This unlucky event happens just after the secret that Faiz is not her real son was revealed. Lia is badly injured and she is hanging on for dear life and Dinita dead shortly after tell the truth about who Farrel and Faiz's parents are. Mischa and Faiz are afraid and make use of this disastrous situation to run away.

Farrel is very anxious and nervous when Lia finishes talking and hangs up the phone from there. He then feels uneasy. And it turns out to be right because not long after that Farrel is informed of the earthquake in Yogyakarta. Farrel panics and worries, even more so as he cannot contact his mother. He immediately decides to go to Yogyakarta as he feels that Lia is in danger and needs help.

Oma is shocked and is hospitalized after she hears the news about the earthquake and Lia being trapped in this national calamity. The entire family cries and pray to God to help save Lia and Oma.

Meanwhile, Mischa continues trying to ascertain Lia's condition, hoping for her death. Faiz asks and even forces her to run away but she insists that she will not leave Yogyakarta before knowing for sure if Lia is dead. Farrel arrives in Yogyakarta, and after a great deal of difficulty, finds a body resembling Lia. At that exact moment, Faiz sees this and thinks that the body Farrel is looking at is Lia's body; he immediately informs Mischa, who is overjoyed and finally agrees to return to Jakarta. Mischa and Faiz are wrong: Lia is still alive under the debris of the hotel, and Farrel finally succeeds in rescuing her. Unaware of this, Faiz and Mischa are surprised when Farrel brings Lia home in an unconscious state. Back in Jakarta, Lia's condition worsens and she goes into a coma. The truth about Mischa lying about Faiz which had to be spoken about did not happen. Mischa does not sit and wait: she tries to kill Lia at the hospital. During her attempt, Mischa almost succeeds when suddenly Lia awakens from her coma. Mischa is very scared and tries to escape but she is caught. Farrel's temper shoots up when he hears the story from Lia, and Mischa and Faiz are finally taken by the police. As the court case goes on, Mischa and Faiz are charged with fraud, attempted homicide and murder.

After the arrest, happiness returns to the family, but Bram and Maya's household is deteriorating. Handoko, the brother of the late Hutama, appears and intends to destroy the happiness of the family. Lia and Hutama hate Handoko, because he once made Hutama's secretary, Asifa, have an affair with Hutama. Since then Handoko would not be regarded as a family.

Mischa gives birth to her son in jail, which, afterwards, was under the care of the Hutama family. Hutama had left a DVD for Fitri at the bank. It turns out Asifa really had an affair and have children of Hutama. Hutama pleaded Fitri to find the boy. Handoko also see the DVD. Asifa turned out to be in Jakarta. Handoko starts to find out about the boy by asking Asifa.

After investigation, it turns out that Faiz is Hutama and Asifa's son. Faiz was born out of wedlock and then thrown into an orphanage for 25 years. Handoko told Asifa and Asifa also intends to help her son, Faiz to leave jail. Faiz and Mischa leave the jail. Faiz then hates Mischa after knowing that he had killed his own father.

Mischa still wants to destroy the happiness of Family Hutama and cooperate with Handoko. But Faiz and Asifa ignored this. Faiz becomes good and is willing to set up a company and does not interfere with the family's happiness.

All is changed when Fahmi, Faiz and Mischa's child is involved in a car accident. The car involved belongs to Farell, but someone had stolen the car. Faiz and Mischa are very sad and both promise to take revenge on his son's death. Faiz and Mischa demand Farell to be imprisoned and severely punished. On the other hand, the Hutama family who believe that Farrell not guilty, try to free Farrell. Mischa later learned that Handoko killed Fahmi. He became angry and would not cooperate again with Handoko. But after Handoko pleaded, Mischa finally agreed.

All the witnesses and the evidence held by Mischa. Mischa offer evidence to freedom Farrell but will lose ownership Retro and Metro. The Hutama family agrees. Farrell is freed and upon learning that, he was furious, and aims to establish a new company. All Retro workers who do not cooperate with Mischa, resign from Retro and joins Farrell's company. Revolution, Farrell's company, becomes competition for Retro. Mischa and Faiz try to impose Farrell with Revolution. Farrell sent Bram to spy Mischa.

Handoko and Mischa's cooperation was almost revealed, but Mischa makes Hartawan the cause of the problem. Maya and Bram's relation is almost toward divorce, and made Alif run away and then had an accident. Fitri is pregnant again. Mischa is not willing to try to kill Fitri's new son. Faiz, who feels unfair because Fitri becomes pregnant while her son died, helps Mischa in the effort to kill the child.

Bram is caught spying Mischa, who then slandered Bram, which made him go to jail. Maya is angry with Farrel and does not allow Farell to meet Raffa before Bram is freed. Efforts to frighten Mischa for admit the truth about Fahmi and Faiz fails.

Fitri finally helps, and succeeds to reveal the truth about Fahmi's death in front of Faiz. Since Mischa began to admit that she killed her own children only for Retro, this made Faiz very angry and even threatened to kill Mischa, and finally Faiz intends to help the Hutama family. Farrel and Faiz cooperation has a result. Tino, Mischa's men was arrested, and Farell upon knowing Handoko's bad intentions, is pushed off a cliff by Handoko. Mischa tries not to be sad, although her loved one has died. Because Maya did not allow Farrel to meet Raffa, this made Mrs. Lia angry and blamed Maya. At the same time, Hadi wanted to sell Revolution, but Mrs. Lia and Bram deny it because they felt it was unfair until it was discovered that Kayla had stage 3 uterine cancer. Fitri, who is still grieving awakens and becomes the leader of Revolution.

Apparently, Farrel is still alive, helped by Mischa and kept in a house. Farrel is conscious but suffers amnesia. But after all, crime will not be eternal. Sure enough, Mischa's efforts to hide Farrel is known. The Hutama family find Farrel. But unfortunately Fitri has to sacrifice for Farell. Farrel would die if he tried to remember his past.

Once again Mischa enters the Hutama household and become Farell's wife, with Fitri being a maid. Fitri once again faces the test of her love with Farrel. Fitri challenges Mischa to get Farell's heart, while Farell himself begins to remember his past.

Farrel who sees Fitri wonders. Where a Fitri's husband? Remembering Farell's effort to win the heart of Bu Lik by pretending to be Fathan, Fitri also tells Farell about Fathan. Fitri also use the name Fathan to get closer to Farrel. The situation was also exploited by Mischa.

Mischa pay Yadi to act as Fathan. Fitri, with the help of all his family, can survive against Mischa and Yadi, which are cornering. Mischa's efforts are useless. Yadi is successfully removed by Fitri with the help of Faiz, Norman, Bram, and family Hutama. Wanting to get rid of Mischa, Fitri also hires a new man, Henry, who becomes Erwin, a rich businessman from Australia.

Fitri and the family take advantage of Mischa's materialistic character to get rid of her. He made it appear that Mischa had an affair with Henry, aka Erwin; and succeeds. Mischa is expelled from the family home by Farrel. Because Mischa has been out of the residence Hutama, Handoko would not want to clean up all this in a way to kill Farrell. Farrell has an accident on the steps of the mosque. Accused of trying to kill Farrell, Mischa blurred.

Fitri asks Handoko about Farell because she was worried about his condition. Handoko also explains that he succeeded in blocking Mischa from entering Farell's room. Mischa is upset having been slandered by Handoko. She threatens to reveal Handoko's intentions to everyone. Meanwhile, Aldo admits that Angel is having his child. Meanwhile, Moza is hysteric upon realizing that her daughter, Aliza, is not moving. Handoko threatens to kill Farrel and instead attempts unsuccessfully to kidnap him. During the action, Handoko was almost stabbed.

=== Season 6, Ramadhan 2 ===
After Mischa's accidental stabbing, Fitri takes her to the hospital in an ambulance and waits for her, because she is in critical condition. Meanwhile, Farrel runs after Handoko but he manages to escape. When Oma and Lia return home, they are unaware that Handoko is already there, determined to finish them all, and has taken Rafa hostage. Lia, Oma and Bulik confront him, and Lia informs Farrel of this situation. Police surround Handoko, who flees while Farrel chases him. Finally, just before dying, Handoko admits to all that he has done. Meanwhile, Mischa's condition improves, but instead of being thankful upon regaining consciousness, she renews animosity by trying to take Farrel away from his home and family. Lia becomes ill from stress, and her condition worsens amid the chaos. As Mischa succeeds in overpowering Farrel, Lia dies, and the entire scene disintegrates. Maya promises to marry Hartawan after getting a divorce, but her feelings for Bram return. Amid severe illness, Kayla begins to feel useless, while Aldo is unable to help Farrel and Fitri because his daughter Aliza is critical; he can only help her if he divorces Mozza and marries Angel.

Apparently, Lia still alive, this secret is only known by Fitri and Oma so that Farrel and Fitri can reunite. But Mischa made it seem as if Fitri had confined Mrs. Lia in the hospital. Farrel was disappointed with Fitri but Farrel still did not believe with Mischa's fake drama.

Slowly but surely, Farrel's memory began to return. At home, Fitri found a cassette recording when Maya was paralyzed due to an accident when she found out what Mischa did to Hutama. Fitri planned to show the video at the hospital to Farrel. Maya came. But Mischa took action again and stole the cassette, handing it over to the Office boy to be destroyed. But the cassette rolled to Mosque. When Farrel and the others followed Zikir, they were shocked to see the video. As a result, Farrel's memory returned a little when he fed Maya and taught her to walk.

Fitri had an accident in a taxi while calling Farrel and fell into the lake. Apparently what caused Fitri to be injured was Mischa's man who hit her from behind using a truck. This made Farrel remember all his life that she was his legal wife. Then Fitri was found by an unknown person and left her on the edge of the lake until finally found by Farrel and both fainted on the edge of the lake. Not long after Farrel regained consciousness, he promised to avenge Mischa's actions which had made him a servant during Amnesia.

Farrel's plan is to remain an amnesiac and will prank Mischa because of her actions to antagonize the Hutama family itself. This is only known by Fitri and Hartawan before Mrs. Lia discovered that Farrel's memory return with Farrel sings Raffa a lullaby. Not long after, when Farrel made it seem as if the Hutama mansion had been bought by someone else, a man in a white suit secretly took all the money, and it turned out to be Hartawan, he was willing to betray the Hutama family because his love for Maya failed. Hartawan then told Mischa that Farrel's memory had recovered and Farrel finally found out that they were actually conspiring to declare the rights and certificates of the Hutama family's house, but unfortunately Farrel was injured by Hartawan in front of his family and made him paralyzed. Not long after that finally Fitri realized Hartawan is a man with white formal suit, then Hartawan chase Fitri to reclaim the Hutama's family land ownership certificate but he was slapped by Faiz & kicked by the paralyzed Farrel.

=== Season 7 ===
Oma is now no more, and the Hutama family is in mourning. Mischa returns with a vengeance: she has accidentally burnt half of her face, and needing to take out her anger on Fitri and Farrel, she comes up with a plan to kidnap Raffa. The Hutama family were reunited after Farrel's recovery from his minor paralysis. All worry because Mischa almost succeeds in entering their house, and Fitri wants to take no risks, so she finally agrees to Lia Hutama's suggestion of hiding Raffa somewhere out of the house. It turns out that Mischa continuously spies on the family and she discovers of their plan, so the Hutamas contact the police for protection, but Mischa evades capture while following Fitri. When Fitri is slightly careless, Mischa finally grabs Rafka from her arms and takes him away. Meanwhile, Kayla forces Hadi to marry Rita immediately because her condition is worsening day by day. Abel finally learns of Kayla's condition and approves of Hadi marrying Rita. But after the wedding, Kayla's condition improves. As time passes, Aldo's business corporation improves. His company surpasses other companies. Automatically, Aldo's family wallow in wealth. This changes Mozza, causing her to feel all the more prestigious especially in educating Aliza, whom she pampers.

However, when Fitri was off guard, Mischa managed to snatch Raffa from Fitri's arms. Mischa took Raffa away. Farrel, Fitri, and Bram chased after Mischa. Realizing that she was being chased, Mischa went to a hidden place, and put Raffa alone in that place. Then, Mischa began to distract Fitri and Farrel. And while chasing Mischa's car, Mischa's car lost control and fell into the river. Even before it sank, Mischa's car exploded. Bram, Farrel and Fitri along with the police searched for Mischa's body. However, in the middle of the search, Fitri was about to give birth. Seeing that, Farrel panicked, and immediately took Fitri.

In the middle of the road, Farrel's car also broke down. His cellphone didn't get a signal. After his car could run and was taken to the health center, the door was locked and there was no one there. After successfully breaking the door, Farrel grabbed the phone at the health center and called Maya and Lia, that Fitri was about to give birth. Finally, the health center administrator, Narti, appeared to help Fitri give birth. Fitri was finally able to give birth safely, while Fitri was taken to the hospital.

Fitri also experienced a critical period. Lia told Farrel to bring Fitri's baby closer to Fitri so that Fitri would wake up soon. It turned out that Fitri managed to wake up and pass her critical period. Fitri was touched to see her child and named him "Rifky Emeraldy Hutama".

Meanwhile, Bram received news from the police that a body had been found, and was about to be autopsied and DNA tested. After the results came out, everyone was curious. Because they didn't want Mischa to die, because Raffa's whereabouts were still unknown. However, Mischa had indeed died. Everyone was shocked and surprised, especially Fitri because they still hadn't found where Raffa was hidden. Fitri, who didn't believe it, went to Mischa's grave. Fitri finally believed and surrendered everything to God.

=== 4 years later.... ===
Rifky has grown up while Raffa is still missing. However, Fitri remains optimistic, one day she can meet Raffa. One day, Fitri, Farrel, and their son Rifky, as well as Mozza, Aldo, and their son Aliza, go on vacation to Surabaya.

Then a kid accidentally bumped into Fitri, and apologized to Fitri. It turned out that the child was "Mischa's child", whose name was Raja. It turned out that Mischa was not dead. With her new identity as Sarah, Mischa completely changed her appearance, her hair was now long with bangs, with super flashy makeup, always wearing blood red lipstick, her character was now a little quieter. Mischa aka Sarah now has a new husband, Ferdi.

Mischa, who felt she would never meet Fitri, instead always met Fitri by accident. This coincidence acquainted Fitri, Farrel and Rifky with Raja. Rifky also became close to Raffa. However, Mischa always avoided Fitri. Mischa was shocked after finding out that Aldo's business partner was Ferdi, who was her husband. However, Mischa managed to escape and because she couldn't stand it, she wanted to go to Jakarta.

Mischa's guess was completely wrong. Fitri still remembered well, and knew Sarah as Mischa. The drama that Mischa played did not affect Fitri. Fitri remained convinced that Sarah was Mischa, and Raja was Raffa. Farrel was not sure that Mischa was Sarah. However, Mischa finally admitted it. She admitted that she was Mischa and Raja was Raffa. She was very happy and satisfied because her efforts to care for Raffa would hurt Fitri.

Finally, for the umpteenth time, Mischa re-entered the Hutama Family, but as Sarah. At first, Lia and Pinkan did not believe that Sarah was Mischa. However, seeing Mischa's movements who were very familiar with the contents of the Hutama house, because she had often gone in and out of the Hutama House, Pinkan and Lia became convinced that Sarah was Mischa. Finally, the Hutama Family tried to expose Mischa's cover in front of Ferdi, and bring Raffa closer to his family again.

Meanwhile, Faiz returned to Hutama's house and made Mischa's situation even more cornered. Fitri made various plans. Mischa finally played a drama so that Raffa hated his own mother. Her plan succeeded, Raffa hated Fitri and didn't want to play with Rifki and the others anymore. Moreover, Raffa even wanted to return to Surabaya with Mischa and Ferdi. Fitri, who was not willing to lose her child for the second time, told Ferdi everything. Of course Ferdi didn't believe it and thought the entire Hutama family was making it up. He was angry and even wanted to return to Surabaya. However, Ferdi was hesitant. Seeing Mischa's strange attitude and increasingly frequent lies, he began to believe a little. Ferdi finally gave the Hutama family a chance to prove all their words.

Failed many times, finally succeeded. Ferdi had fully believed and even wanted to confront Mischa, but thinking about the fate of Raffa and the Hutama family, he agreed to join the Hutama Family's game against Mischa. Finally Raffa chose Fitri, his biological mother. Fitri's wish came true. Finally they all told Raffa the truth, that Fitri was his biological mother. Raffa accepted it all and even asked why they only told him now.

Raffa returned to the Hutama Family and gathered together. Meanwhile, Mischa was first secured at Hutama's house and then taken to a mental hospital. However, Mischa even managed to escape, and was about to take all the money from Ferdi's laptop in his room. However, Ferdi came in. Mischa had a fight with Ferdi, and pushed him until he hit the glass table. The glass even pierced Ferdi's stomach. Farrel finally found Ferdi, pulled out the glass and was about to take Ferdi to the hospital. Accidentally, all of these events were recorded via the webcam on Ferdi's laptop. Mischa took advantage of it all and made it evidence so that Farrel fell into her hands. Ferdi's condition was critical. Ferdi had even died before stating the truth. Automatically, the recording that Mischa was holding could trap Farrel. For that, he threatened Fitri to leave the Hutama Family forever. Fitri had no choice but to agree. She was not willing if her family had to be tortured again by Mischa.

Fitri and Mischa had a car accident and fell into the lake. The Hutama family became hysterical after being informed by the police. It seems that the DNA test confirms that it is indeed Fitri's body. Meanwhile, Farrel was helped by a female doctor named Sita. After contacting all of Hutama's family, who then told Sita that they were looking for people who had accidents in the river. Sita also said that in her hospital, she found victims who died.

But Fitri was still alive, surviving because of local residents' assistance. However, Fitri did not dare to appear because she remembered Mischa's threat. Fitri wondered why the DNA test results could match. After further investigation, it turned out that Sita was Mischa's ally, who worked with her to win the hearts of Farrel and the entire Hutama family, so that they could forget Fitri. As a result, Sita often came to the Hutama family to carry out her plan on the pretext of taking care of the Hutama family that Fitri had left.

Mischa finally re-enters the Hutama Family as Lilik, to control the situation in the Hutama house. Fitri also did not want to lose, namely by disguising herself as a man, driver, and being funny to attract attention, namely Mr. Ade. As Ade, Fitri successfully thwarts all of Mischa and Sita's evil plans, and plays a terrible trick on them both.

It turned out that because of Mischa's actions, Sita's uterus was injured and she would not be able to bear children. Sita was furious at Mischa and intended to get rid of Mischa. It turned out that the matter of Sita's uterus was just Mischa's fabrication to make Sita smarter and more responsive. As a result, Sita moved faster and more aggressively approached Farrel. Sita even continued to imitate Fitri's style to win Farrel's heart. Of course Farrel was not affected, because according to him Fitri could never be replaced. Lia was just as aggressive as Sita. She continued to match Farrel with Sita. Lia even threw away Fitri's belongings.

And then we move to Kayla's family, Kayla increasingly pressured Hadi to marry Rita immediately, especially because her condition was deteriorating. Abel, who had previously objected, finally found out about Kayla's condition and agreed to Hadi's marriage to Rita. Finally, Hadi and Rita got married in front of Kayla. Kayla, who was dying, felt ready to go. But the opposite happened. Kayla recovered, this made Abel and Hadi plan to divorce Rita. Kayla was hesitant, in her heart she felt sorry, because Rita loved Hadi. But she also did not want her love to be divided.

To Aldo's family, Aldo's company turned out to be improving. Its success surpassed other companies, automatically making Aldo's family roll in money. However, that actually changed Mozza. Mozza became more prestigious, especially in educating Aliza. He spoiled Aliza very much. Meanwhile, Mozza is now busy taking care of Ferdy's company who has died. This left Aliza neglected because Mozza paid less attention to her child. But in the end, Mozza made a mistake for his behavior forever, and promised to take care of Aliza.

Back to Fitri's plan. While preventing Mischa's plan, Fitri, as Ade, tries to find fake evidence of Ferdi's murder held by Mischa. Fitri's efforts are successful. Fitri manages to get it from Mischa's safe. Tragically, after obtaining the evidence, and about to reveal all the facts, Fitri has an accident when she is about to call Farrel.

=== 1 year later.... ===
After the accident, Fitri became amnesiac and was helped by a money-hungry married couple, namely Babe and Nyak Marzuki and become a Betawi person, then rename Fitri to Saodah. When Saodah was on the street, Mischa who happened to be there, saw Saodah. At first she thought it was Fitri and tried to find out who the woman who looked like Fitri was. Finally Mischa found out that the woman was Saodah. Saodah is ready to carry out Mischa's first plan, which is to live in the Hutama family's house by pretending to be Fitri, Farel's wife.

At another time, Farrel also found Fitri who is now Saodah and brought him back to the Hutama's mansion. Previously, Farrel and Sita almost got engaged because of Lia's request, but everything changed when Fitri aka Saodah appeared in front of the Hutama family. This makes Sita even more cornered because their engagement was canceled by Fitri's return.

In several episodes later, Mischa launched her next plan, which was to pit Farel against Bram. Mischa told Saodah to collect photos and files from Farel's office, because Mischa would use them to win the tender against Retro. Farel thought there was a traitor behind all this. Mischa slandered Bram by writing a check for 400 million from Retro's rival company. Farel was shocked that Bram was the traitor. Bram did not accept it. This plan succeeded in making both parties clash. However, Saodah regretted it because all this time she was the one who made the Hutama family chaotic. She wanted to flee from this problem, but Mischa threatened to imprison Nyak and Babe. Farel sought evidence and went to the Rival's office. It turned out that Bram was also there, investigating this problem. Farel was furious with Bram.

Saodah finally began to love the Hutama family. She wanted the problems in the Hutama family to be resolved soon. One day, Saodah followed Mischa to the mall. Then she contacted Farel to come and pick her up. Saodah heard someone announcing a lost item. And Saodah got an idea. Saodah stole Mischa's wallet and put it at the information center. And at that moment an announcement was heard that someone named Mischa's wallet was lost. Farel, who was already at the mall, heard it and went to the information center. And then Farel met Mischa. Farel was shocked. But Mischa had already run away. Then Farel told the whole house that Mischa had returned, but this made Bram angry with Farrel and did not want to forgive Farrel and Mami. Mami was sure that the cause of this chaos was Mischa. Then Mami apologized to Bram and Maya. But Maya still could not forgive Mami for slandering Bram. Slowly, both Maya and Bram finally forgave Mami.

Until one day, the time came when they all had to leave the Hutama's mansion. Fitri tried to calm Farrel who looked emotional because Mischa kicked out their family in a very low way. Farel and his family moved to Aldo and Moza's house. At Aldo and Moza's house, they were very happy to welcome the Hutama family to their house. Even though there was Mischa's spy, Sita. Farel and Fitri made peace with Bram because Fitri was the one who had caused their family to fight. Farel could do nothing to fight Mischa. Because Mischa had a DVD containing a video of Farel's fake murder of Ferdy. If Farel fought back, Mischa would take the DVD to the police. Farel then made a plan to become Mischa's spy. Sita who knew about it immediately told Mischa. Farrel immediately reworked his plan. Bram pretended to betray the Hutama family, and returned to serving Mischa. Bram managed to convince Mischa.

And then, In the upcoming episodes, there will be many more problems coming, starting from Lia being kidnapped by Mischa, Nadine was hit with car by Mischa's men, Rita being thrown out of the house by Kayla, Aldo and Moza's marriage almost at the end of its life, and Sherly (Norman's first wife) shows herself secretly in front of Norman and Salsa by Yuda himself when dinner.

When Mischa goes to the hotel, Lia follows Mischa from behind. Lia takes Mischa's bag containing DVDs and runs into the burning house. Mischa chases Lia. Maya vowed to kill Mischa if something bad happened to Lia. The police informed the Hutama family that the police did not find any victims at the scene and they would try hard to find witnesses so that Lia could be found. But it turned out, Lia was being held captive by Mischa. Lia would never hand over the DVD to Mischa even though Mischa intended to kill her. Lia was held captive for days, but she still wouldn't tell anyone where the DVD was.

We talked to Aldo's family. After several years of not seeing each other, Moza meets her old friend, Raymon. Raymon has loved Moza for a long time. And now he does not waste the opportunity to win Moza. Raymon invites Moza to meet as a way of expressing someone's longing for a friend, at a disco. Then Raymon puts sleeping powder into Moza's drink. Moza falls asleep. When she wakes up, Moza finds herself with Raymon. Moza begs Raymon to keep all this a secret.

Moza is always terrorized by Raymon. Raymon threatens to spread intimate photos of the two of them. Then Moza invites her to meet at a cafe, where it turns out Mischa is there. Mischa finds out about all of that. Mischa then meets Moza, and says that she also has the photos. But in reality, she doesn't. Mischa gives a condition that Moza's photos not be spread, by becoming a spy for all of Farrel's plans. Moza is forced to agree. Now, every time the Hutama family makes a plan, Moza will tell Mischa. Farel is confused, because Mischa always knows all of his plans. Moza can't stand all of this anymore. But she is afraid of being separated from Aldo.

Moza went straight to Raymon's office and asked for the photos because Mischa was increasingly threatening her. Farrel and Fitri followed her from behind. Moza begged Raymon not to bother her anymore. Raymon ignored her and instead wanted to rape Moza. Luckily Farrel and Fitri immediately saved Moza. Farrel immediately beat Raymon and told Faiz that all the photos were in Raymon's house. Faiz arrived at Raymon's house and immediately looked for the photos in Raymon's office. The photos were stored on Raymon's camera and laptop. Suddenly Mischa came to Raymon's office to find Raymon being beaten up by Farrel. Mischa freed Raymon and Faiz managed to delete all the photos of Moza with Raymon. Farrel, Fitri, and Moza smiled happily. Mischa was very upset with their actions.

But it turns out that Raymon still has the photos. Raymon is still terrorizing Moza. But Moza doesn't know where he is. Faiz approaches Moza who is panicking because of Raymon. Faiz will try to help Moza, but Aldo hears their conversation. Faiz and Moza rush to the hotel where Raymon is staying. Aldo follows Faiz and Moza. When at the hotel, Faiz asks someone to open Raymon's room. Aldo goes in. Aldo sees a photo of Raymon with Moza lying on the table. Seeing this angers Aldo. Moza is very sad and apologizes to Aldo. Faiz tries to explain everything. Aldo is very disappointed with Moza. Raymon sends a text message to Moza and laughs at her. Aldo is sad because Moza has broken his heart. Meanwhile, Aldo intends to divorce Moza.

Back to Hutama's family, until some time later, Nadine finally returned to Indonesia. Nadine then asked about her mother. Farrel explained everything. Nadine was a little shocked to find out that Lia was being held captive by her mother. Nadine then called her mother, and they made an appointment at a place. Mischa panicked when she learned that her child had come home. At that place, Nadine persuaded Mischa to free Lia. However, Mischa remained firm in her stance, because she was doing all this for Nadine's good.

Finally, Farrel planned something, namely telling Nadine to disguise herself as a nurse. When they got location there, the doctor examined Lia with the door locked. Meanwhile, Nadine's disguise was blown by Mischa. The doctor then took Lia through the window. Lia was then taken to the car. Nadine then left the house, and when she was heading to the car, she was hit by another car. The doctor immediately left Nadine. Mischa then took Nadine to the hospital.

When Nadine woke up, she didn't want to talk to Mischa. Mischa was sad. At home, she always thought about Nadine, until she coughed and coughed up blood. When she was checked at the hospital, the doctor diagnosed that her old cancer (as in the first two seasons) had grown back and was even classified as malignant.

Nadine finally gave Mischa a condition that she must return all the rights of the Hutama family if she wanted to be recognized as a mother. Mischa, who this time really wanted to repent, was actually hindered by Sita. Sita was not willing if all the property that had been seized from Farel was suddenly returned. Sita held Mischa hostage. In her weak condition, Sita still tied Mischa's feet and hands. Sita hurriedly prepared the documents to legalize the property in Mischa's name as hers, but Mischa refused to sign.

To Kayla's family. Kayla still felt that Hadi thought more about Rita than her. One day, Kayla found herself pregnant. Hadi was listening to it. And at the same time she saw Rita who was vomiting. Kayla thought Rita was also pregnant, and wondered why Rita always grabbed Hadi's attention, this time by impregnating Rita.

It turned out that Rita had uterine cancer. Because she didn't want to bother Hadi and Kayla, she left the house. Kayla was a little happy. But in the end it spread that Rita had cancer. Abel was angry with Kayla, because he thought Kayla had made Rita leave the house, even though she was sick. Keyla finally realized it, and helped look for Rita.

The next day, when Keyla went to the hospital, she met Rita. Rita was shocked and immediately ran. Kayla chased her, and on the road Rita felt dizzy. A motorbike almost hit Rita, and Kayla came to avoid Rita from the motorbike. They both fell on the side of the road. Rita fainted, while Kayla was bleeding and fainted.

=== Episode 109 ===
Nadine, who saw Mischa really surrendering herself to prison and handing over all the assets of the Hutama Family, was touched and then forgave her mother. Mischa, who had been tried and sentenced to 15 years dying in prison, was immediately taken to the hospital.

Meanwhile, there was a possibility that Kayla and her baby could not be saved, but all of that could be denied. Kayla and her baby were safe. However, Rita died while praying for Kayla. Kayla lived happily with Hadi, Abel, Dewa, and her future baby.

Meanwhile, Aldo managed to find Raymond's house. Emotional, Aldo broke Raymond's car window. Raymond then took Moza out while guarding Moza. Aldo approached Moza. Raymond told Aldo that Moza did not remember Aldo when they were together. Raymond also said that he and Moza had fun together. Moza, who was being held by Raymond, begged Aldo to not believe this. Aldo, who tried not to believe it, chose to leave and not save Moza. When Moza rebelled and slapped Raymond, Aldo turned back and beat Raymond. Aldo said that he knew Moza was here because of Raymond's servant named Ujang. Raymond was arrested by the police and before that, Moza slapped Raymond and beat Raymond several times. After being taken away by the police, Aldo hugged Moza. Aldo said that he couldn't live without Moza. Aldo forgave Moza's mistakes, Moza also had to forgive Aldo, who no longer trusted Moza. Moza also said that Aldo was her happiness.

Aldo and Moza who had reconciled returned to Mr. Iman's house bringing Aliza. Mr. Iman was happy with Aldo and Moza. If Mr. Iman had to leave, Mr. Iman was sincere. Not long after, Sherly, Norman's first ex-wife came to see Mr. Iman. And asked Mr. Iman to forgive her and Sherly also wanted her life to be happy with Norman and Yuga.

Then, Sherlin asked Salsa to stay away from Norman and was heard by Yuga so Yuga hated Sherlin. Sherlin changed her mind and finally made a surprise wedding for Norman and Salsa. The wedding was happy and Sherlin was accepted as Yuga's mother but Yuga was still under the care of Norman and Salsa.

Meanwhile, Fitri immediately followed Mischa and it turned out that Sita was also there who pretended to commit suicide so she could escape. Mischa had a coma in front of Fitri, after that Sita came and immediately ambushed Fitri and intended to kill her. At that time Farrel came to save Fitri, they managed to escape from Sita. Sita was about to stab Farrel, but Mischa immediately lunged at her, but unfortunately she was stabbed by Sita. Sita was arrested again by the police and sentenced to life, while Mischa was immediately treated by a doctor. When Mischa came to her senses she invited Fitri to pray in congregation with Fitri.

During the prayer Farrel was the imam. After praying Farrel forgave Mischa, at that moment Mischa took her last breath after kissing Farrel's hand.

Some time later, Farrel and Fitri's happiness was complete, they returned home with Nadine. One night, Fitri and Farrel's wedding anniversary party was held where all family members were present and also Iman's family. The party went lively. Everything ended happily, while the whole family gathered (except Maya, because the cast Verlita Evelyn is pregnant and will give birth soon), a woman who looked like Mischa came, and everyone was shocked. It turned out she was not Mischa, but Dinda Kanya Dewi thanked the viewers for their attention who had watched Cinta Fitri from Season 1 to Season 7 and said the slogan East or West, Cinta Fitri Farrel is The Best.

== Reboot ==
On 20 February 2021, Manoj Punjabi announced that they will be producing a reboot version of Cinta Fitri on WeTV. With the cast like Tissa Biani and Rizky Nazar. On 15 September 2021, the first promo was released. The reboot version was broadcast from 5 October 2021 and ended on 17 November 2021.
