= Kamulah Satu-Satunya =

- Directed by: Hanung Bramantyo
- Written by: Hanung Bramantyo, Raditya Bramantyo
- Produced by: Reza Hidayat, Vena Annisa, & Chand Parvez Servia
- Starring: Nirina Zubir; Didi Petet; Junior Liem; Dennis Adhiswara; Ringgo Agus Rahman; Ence Bagus; Fanny Fadillah; Tarzan Srimulat
- Cinematography: Faozan Rizal
- Edited by: Cesa David Luckmansyah
- Music by: Bongky BIP
- Distributed by: Oreima Production & Kharisma Starvision Plus
- Release date: July 12, 2007
- Running time: 102 Minutes
- Country: Indonesia
- Language: Indonesia

Kamulah Satu-Satunya (You're the Only One) is a 2007 Indonesian comedy film directed by Hanung Bramantyo and starring Nirina Zubir, Junior Liem, Didi Petet, Tarzan, Fanny Fadillah, Ringgo Agus Rahman, and Dennis Adhiswara. The film premiered on July 12, 2007 in Jakarta. Productions by Oreima Films & Starvision.

== Cast ==
- Nirina Zubir as Indah
- Junior Liem as Bowo
- Didi Petet as Abah (Grandfather)
- Dennis Adhiswara as Security 1
- Fanny Fadillah as Franky
- Ringgo Agus Rahman as Security 1
- Tarzan Srimulat as Teacher
- Aline Adita as Presenter
- Andhara Early as presenter quiz
- Almir Jumandi as post man
- Epy Kusnandar as assistant 1
- ENce Bagus as assistant 2
- Yurike Prastika as Bowo's Aunt
- Pak Ogah as Indah's friend in Jakarta

Special Appearances

- Dewa 19

== Plot ==
Indah, (Nirina Zubir) whose parents died a long time ago, is studying in high school and living a very poor lifestyle with her grandfather (Didi Petet). Indah never complains, but she holds on to her dream of meeting her favorite idol group Dewa Band face to face, whose songs are very inspirational to her.

Her dream is finally in reach when she hears that Dewa Band are giving out 10 tickets to fans to meet them directly through a lottery held throughout Indonesia. Bowo (Junior Liem), Indah's close friend, can't stand to see Indah disappointed because of his hidden feelings for her, strives to let Indah meet her idols by selling his beloved antiques bicycle and bringing her to Jakarta. Events don't go as planned, though, as Jakarta is not as Indah imagined.

Will Indah get to meet Dewa Band?

== Information ==
- @You're the Only One - Starvision
