= June & Kopi =

2021 Indonesian film

- Directed by: Noviandra Santosa
- Written by: Noviandra Santosa; Titien Wattimena
- Produced by: Noviandra Santosa
- Starring: Acha Septriasa; Ryan Delon; Makayla Rose Hilli
- Cinematography: Budi Utomo
- Music by: Joy Ngiaw
- Production company: Aurora Films
- Distributed by: Netflix
- Release date: January 28, 2021
- Running time: 90 minutes
- Country: Indonesia
- Language: Indonesian

June & Kopi is a 2021 Indonesian family comedy film directed by Noviandra Santosa, written by Noviandra Santosa and Titien Wattimena and starring Acha Septriasa, Ryan Delon and Makayla Rose Hilli. The film was digitally released on January 28, 2021, by Netflix.

== Plot ==
One day, a stray dog roams the streets of Indonesia, before being chased by a group of kids. The dog eventually runs into a graphic designer named Aya, who fends off the kids and feeds the dog her snack. The dog takes a liking towards Aya and follows her home. She takes the dog inside, and with the help of Aunt Ika, cleans the dog. The dog eventually meets Aya's own dog: a pit bull named Kopi, who takes an interest in her. Aya's husband Ale, however, does not like her and demands the dog be sent to the shelter; Aya reluctantly agrees. At the shelter, Aya names the dog June when seeing a dog-themed calendar. June does not behave well there and is taken home; Ale reluctantly agrees to let Aya keep June.

June begins adjusting to her new life by imitating Kopi's actions. She is also shown to have a fear of kids due to trauma. Stakes rise as Aya gives birth to a girl named Karin, and to everyone's surprise, June comforts Karin while she is crying. As time flies, the family learns that Karin suffers asthma. June is able to take care of Karin, while Kopi is proving himself to be rather lazy, but also willing to help get June out of trouble. Aya works on her next comic, June and Kopi, and is nervous to submit it. Seeing this, Ale offers to take Aya and Karin on a vacation to a forested villa. Unfortunately, the policy prohibits dogs, so June and Kopi are left home with Ika. The pair, missing Aya and Ale, escape the house while Ika is asleep. June runs out of the gate to go to Aya, and Kopi catches up.

After getting bullied, Karin escapes and runs off into the forest. Meanwhile, June and Kopi arrive at the forest and split: Kopi to Ale and Aya, and June going to Karin. June finds Karin, injured and tired, and they both shelter until the rain stops. Kopi finds the opening to the forest, and Ale goes into it, while Kopi and Aya stay behind. Karin has an asthma attack, and June finds Ale, bringing him to Karin. As they escape, an animal trap was set; June knocks Ale and Karin out of the way, but gets mortally wounded by it herself. With the help of Kopi, they all make it out of the forest. Karin is healed, but June, having lost too much blood, and been poisoned by the trap, will die soon. Ale tearfully thanks June for saving Karin and shakes her paw, something he always does with Kopi. Back at home, the family is watching the sunset by the lake to give June some peace in her last moments. Aya thanks June for taking care of Karin and allows her to rest; she soon does.

As June & Kopi becomes a big hit, many fans worldwide send heartfelt condolences for June. Kopi replaces June as Karin's protector and guides her up the stairs. One day, Ale and Karin go to the shelter to buy a dog for Aya, and Karin picks a white dog with identical looks to June.

== Cast ==
- Acha Septriasa as Aya
- Ryan Delon as Ale
- Makayla Rose Hilli as Karin
- Tj Ruth as Tante Ika
