= Shireen Sungkar =

Indonesian actress and singer (born 1992)

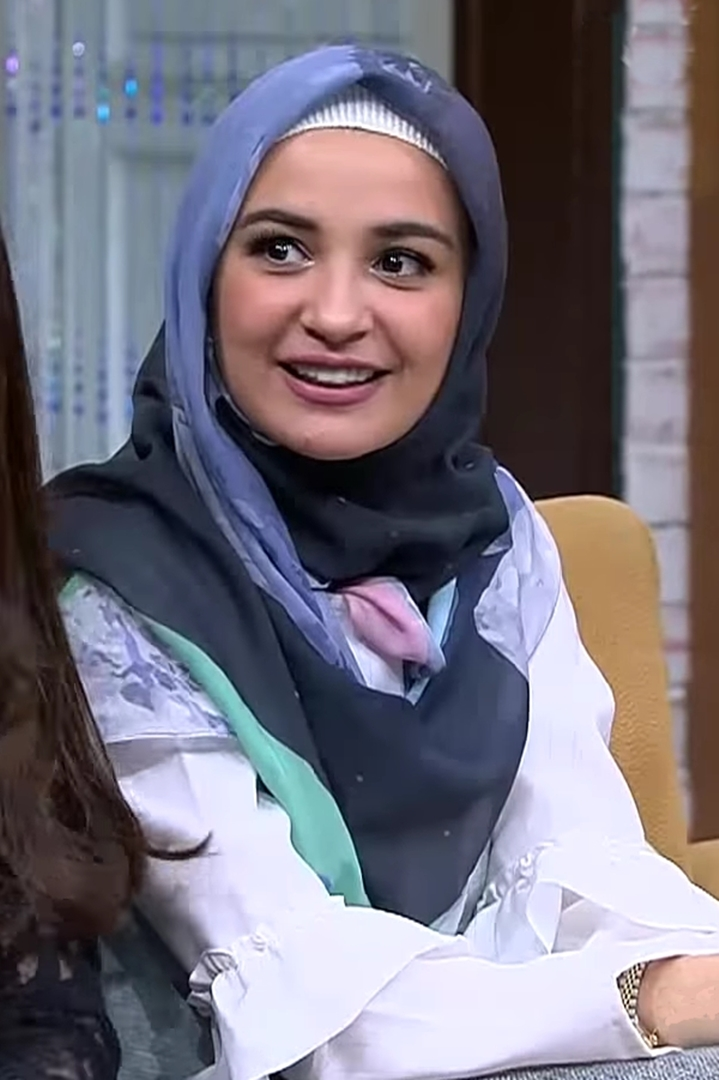
- Shireen in 2017
- Born: Shireen Sungkar; 28 January 1992 (age 34); Jakarta, Indonesia
- Occupations: Actress; singer
- Spouse: Teuku Wisnu (m. 2013)
- Parent(s): Mark Sungkar (father); Fanny Bauty (mother)
- Relatives: Zaskia Sungkar (sister); Irwansyah (brother-in-law)

Shireen Sungkar (born 28 January 1992) is an Indonesian actress and singer of Arabic and Minangkabau descent. She is the daughter of Indonesian actors Fanny Bauty and Mark Sungkar.

== Career ==
Shireen started as a semi-finalist in GADIS sampul pageant, 2006. Interested in acting since childhood, Shireen was cast for her first role while delivering her aunt in SinemArt casting. Her first role was a supporting role in a soap opera Bukan diriku along with Baim Wong and Ririn Dwi Ariyanti. Her name began to be known since she starred in the soap opera, Wulan, along with Dhini Aminarti. Other patrons who had also been supported was like, Putri Duyung and Perempuan Teraniaya.

Apart from SinemArt, Shireen moved to MD Entertainment and immediately got the lead role as Fitri in "Cinta Fitri 1 & 2" .

Not just acting, Shireen also has talent in singing. Together with her older sister, Zaskia Sungkar, she formed the vocal duo group The Sisters. The debut album of the two was given the title The Journey of Love, and was released on 25 July 2008.

== Personal life ==
As an act of gratitude for her success in the play as Fitri, Shireen performed Umrah worship to celebrate Idul Fitri 1428 H in the holy land of Mecca. Shireen went with her parents, Mark Sungkar and Fanny Bauty, as well as Zaskia, 21, her sister, and Yusuf, 12, her brother. They departed on October 6 and returned to Jakarta on Tuesday, 16 October 2007.

She married Teuku Wisnu on 17 November 2013.

== Filmography ==
=== Film ===
| Year | Title | Role | Producer |
|---|---|---|---|
| 2009 | Suka Ma Suka | | MD Pictures |
| 2013 | Wanita Tetap Wanita | Kinan | R1 Pictures |
| 2013 | Honeymoon | Farah | Starvision Plus |
| 2016 | Ketika Mas Gagah Pergi the Movie | | PT Indobroadcast & ACT; SinemArt |

=== Television ===
| Year | Title | Role | Producer |
|---|---|---|---|
| 2006 | Bukan Diriku | Rhea | SinemArt |
| 2006–2007 | Wulan | Shinta | SinemArt |
| 2007 | Hidayah (Episode: Buruk Rupa Buruk Hati) | | MD Entertainment |
| 2007 | Bunga | Dewi | MD Entertainment |
| 2007–2011 | Cinta Fitri | Fitri Rahayu | MD Entertainment |
| 2008 | Annisa | Aisyah | MD Entertainment |
| 2011 | Ranum | Ranum | MD Entertainment |
| 2011 | Cinta di Ujung Kartu Kredit | | MD Entertainment |
| 2012 | Dia Ayu | Ayu | MD Entertainment |
| 2012 | Maaf yang Tertunda | Qasidah | MD Entertainment |
| 2012 | Ibu Dengarkan Laguku | Syahrifa | |
| 2013 | Ali James Bon | Jamila | |
| 2013 | Istri Yang Dikhianati | Yasmin/Jingga | |
| 2015 | Di Bawah Lindungan Abah | Jasmine | |
| 2015 | Cinta Di Langit Taj Mahal 2 | Aisyah | Maxima Pictures |

=== Music video ===
- Dik - (Wali) (2008)
- Egokah Aku - (Wali) (2008)
- Aku Sakit - (Wali) (2008)

== Discography ==
- Kamu Kamu Lagi
- Jauh Di Mata Dekat Di Hati
- Keajaiban Cinta
- Ku Sedang Jatuh Cinta
- Tak Lagi Sama
- Cinta Kita (with Teuku Wisnu)
- Allahu Akbar (with Teuku Wisnu)
- Anything For You (with Teuku Wisnu)
- Penjaga Hati

== Awards and nominations ==
| Year | Awards | Category | Result |
|---|---|---|---|
| 2008 | SCTV Awards 2008 | Top Actress (sinetron) Cinta Fitri | Won |
| 2008–2011 | Indonesia Kids Choice Awards | Most Favourite Actress | Nominated |
| 2009 | Panasonic Awards 2009 | Most Favourite Actress (sinetron) Cinta Fitri | Won |
| 2009 | Insert Awards 2009 | Most Favourite Female Celebrity | Won |
| 2009 | SCTV Awards 2009 | Top Actress (sinetron) Cinta Fitri | Won |
| 2010 | SCTV Awards 2010 | Top Actress (sinetron) Cinta Fitri | Won |
| 2010 | Panasonic Gobel Awards 2010 | Most Favourite Actress (sinetron) Cinta Fitri | Nominated |
| 2010 | Tabloid Bintang | Queen of Sinetron | Won |
| 2011 | Insert Awards 2011 | Best Couple with Teuku Wisnu | Won |
| 2011 | Panasonic Gobel Awards 2011 | Most Favourite Artist | Nominated |
| 2012 | Panasonic Gobel Awards 2012 | Most Favourite Artist | Nominated |
| 2014 | Panasonic Gobel Awards 2014 | Most Favourite Artist | Nominated |
| 2015 | Festival Film Bandung 2015 | Commendable Female Actor in Television Series | Won |
| 2015 | Insert Awards 2015 | The Hottest Couple with Teuku Wisnu | Nominated |
| 2016 | Infotainment Awards 2016 | Most Fashionable Hijab Celebrity | Nominated |
| 2017 | Infotainment Awards 2017 | Most Fashionable Hijab Celebrity | Nominated |
