= Yuki Kato (actress) =

Indonesian actress (born 1995)

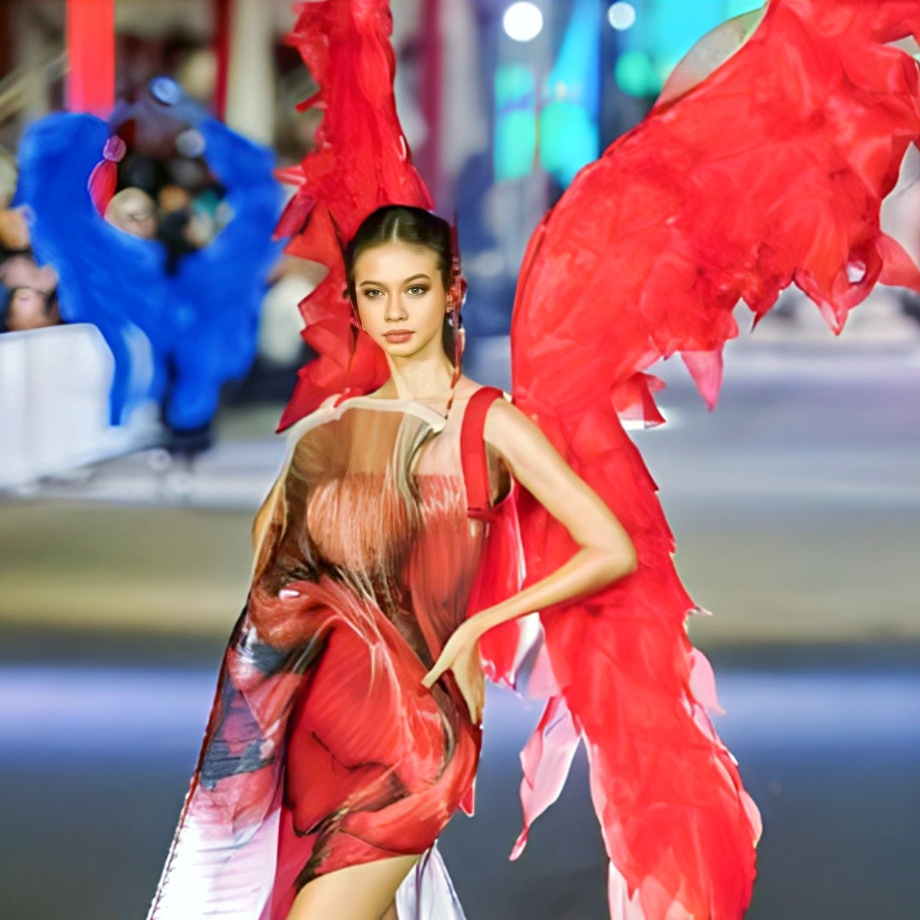
- Kato in 2023
- Born: Yuki Anggraini Kato; 2 April 1995 (age 30); Malang, East Java, Indonesia
- Occupations: Actress; model
- Years active: 2005–present

Yuki Anggraini Kato (born 2 April 1995) is an Indonesian actress.

== Early and personal life ==
Kato was born in Malang to a Japanese father and an Indonesian mother of Javanese ethnicity. She has two younger sisters. When the family moved to Jakarta in 2002, Kato experienced bullying at school for having light brown hair and mixed background. She planned to continue her education in Tokyo, Japan, but failed due to late registration. Later, she graduated from the Faculty of Social and Political Sciences at the University of Indonesia, majoring in international relations. She is a Muslim.

== Filmography ==
=== Film ===
List of film appearances, with year, title, and role shown
Year	Title	Role	Notes	Ref.
2008	Basahhh...	Annissa		
2013	Operation Wedding	Windi		
2015	This Is Cinta	Rachel		
2015	Pizza Man	Merry		
2015	Cabe-Cabean	Susan		
2015	Kembar 5	Gendhis		
2016	Petualangan Singa Pemberani Atlantos	Liona	Voice-over	
2017	Cahaya Cinta Pesantren	Shila		
2019	Nikah Yuk	Lia		

=== Television ===
List of television appearances, with year, title, and role shown
Year	Title	Role	Notes	Ref.
2003–2005	Inikah Rasanya?	Jinny		
2004	Nirmala	Erika		
2007	My Love	Cinta		
2007	Monyet Cantik	Lisa		
2007	Heart Series	Rachel Amandita		
2009–2010	Putih Merah	Sinta		
2010–2011	Arti Sahabat	Rahayu Ajeng/ Princess Keong		
2011	Arti Sahabat Musim Kedua	Rahayu Ajeng/ Princess Keong		
2011	Gol-Gol Fatimah	Fatimah		
2011–2012	Dia atau Diriku	Zahra/ Bella		
2013	Heart Series 2	Rachel Amandita		
2013–2014	Fortune Cookies (id)	Fathin		
2014	Akankah Bunda Datang ke Pernikahanku	Permata	TV film	
2015	Penyihir Cantik	Milly/Kesya		
2020–2022	Pretty Little Liars	Alissa Gabriela		

== Awards and nominations ==
Year	Organisation	Award	Nominee / Work	Result	Ref.
2010	Gaulteenment Awards	Favorite Actress	Yuki Kato	Won	
2011	SCTV Awards	Famous Actress	Gol-Gol Fatimah	Won	
2011	Gaulteenment Awards	Favorite Actress	Yuki Kato	Won	
2012	Gaulteenment Awards	Favorite Actress	Yuki Kato	Won	
2014	Indonesian Film Festival Vidia Awards	Best Leading Actress	Akankah Bunda Datang ke Pernikahanku	Won	
2014	Bandung Film Festival	Best FTV Actress	Akankah Bunda Datang ke Pernikahanku	Won	
