= This Is Cinta =

- Directed by: Sonny Gaokasak
- Written by: Haqi Achmad
- Produced by: Chand Parwez Servia; Fiaz Servia
- Starring: Yuki Kato; Shawn Adrian Khulafa; Fandy Christian; Fahira Al Idrus; Ari Wibowo; Unique Priscilla; Aida Nurmala; McDanny; Sandrinna Skornicki; Richelle Skornicki; Alwi Assegaf; Mo Sidik; Yuka Idol; Yama Carlos; Indra Bekti; 703 Richard; Joshua Pandelaki; Uus; Monica Oemardi; Faradilla Yoshi; Emmie Lemu
- Release date: 12 February 2015
- Countries: Indonesia; New Zealand
- Language: Indonesian

This Is Cinta is an Indonesian romantic drama film released on February 12, 2015 and directed by Sony Gaokasak, the shooting locations were in Bogor and Jakarta in Indonesia and also in Auckland, New Zealand. Adrian portrayed male lead role named Farel. While Kato played female lead role named Rachel. Both characters are storied to always want to be together but are constrained by circumstances that had never they suspected.

== Plot ==
Indonesian kindergarten students Rachel and Farel, who have the same extracurricular activity of music, live in neighboring apartments. A problem is that at times, Rachel would suffer while hanging out with Farel, prompting Rachel's helicopter mother to avoid them meeting, though Rachel proudly rebels. One day, Farel promises to Rachel that he will bring her to a majestic castle he imagines of. In the extracurricular, a recurring song is "This is Cinta" ("This is Love"): Rachel sings, while Farel plays the piano.

It has been 12 years since they separate. Farel is a college student and soon-to-be pianist, while Rachel, still trapped within his mother, is being forced to form a romantic bond with a man named Nicko, with whom she can't. At a talent show, Farel reveals that he is motivated to be a pianist because of Rachel, and still keeps his castle sketch. Rachel sees this on TV, and they reunite the next morning. At the talent show, Farel succeeds to the final round, and the host asks Rachel to duet with him in said round.

Rachel's mother discovers her rehearsing, and grounds her. Rachel and her parents have a long argument about her being an independent 17-year-old adult. That night, Nicko brings her out— specifically, trapping her at a warehouse to rape her. Rachel texts Farel, who brings Rachel to flee. While chasing the two, Nicko crashes Farel's borrowed motorbike, critically injuring Rachel and putting Farel in asystole. Nicko is arrested, and Rachel's parents regret themselves. As the two near Heaven, Farel's desires drag him back to life, while Rachel tearfully walks away from life. To attract Rachel, Farel plays "This is Cinta" nearby her hospital room; he succeeds. As Rachel is discharged, the two fly to Auckland, where the majestic castle is revealed to exist amid a rural field.

== Cast ==
=== Lead roles ===
- Yuki A. Kato as Rachel
- Shawn Adrian as Farrel
- Aida Nurmala as Rachel's mother
- Fahira Alidrus as Sasa
- Fandi Christian as Nicko
- Ari Wibowo as Rachel's father
- Yunique Pricsyilla as Farel's mother

=== Supporting roles ===
- Sandrinna M. Skornicki
- Richele Georgeti Skornicki
- Alwi Assegaf
- Indra Bekti
- Yuka Idol
- Emmi Lemu
- Mc Danny
- Mo Sidiq
- Yama Carlos
- 703 Richard
- Joshua Pandelaki
- Monica Oemardy
- Uus
- Faradilla Yoshy
