= Acha Septriasa =

Indonesian actress (born 1989)

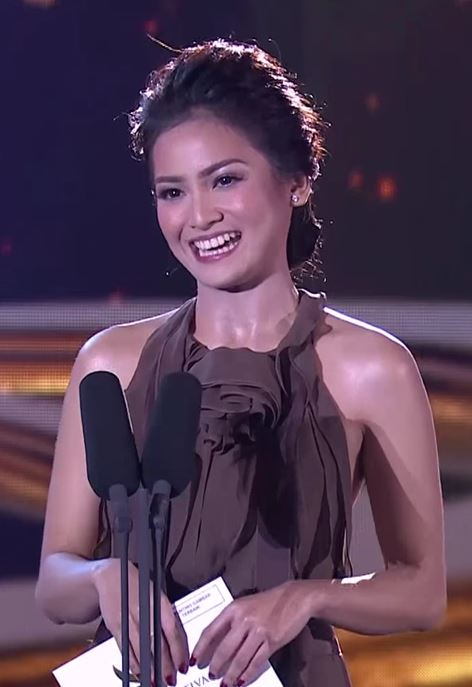
- Born: Jelita Septriasa; September 1, 1989 (age 36); Jakarta, Indonesia
- Occupations: Singer, model
- Awards: Citra Award for Best Actress in lead role

Jelita Septriasa (born in Jakarta, Indonesia on 1 September 1989), known professionally as Acha Septriasa is an Indonesian actress, singer, and model of Minangkabau descent.

== Biography ==
Acha Septriasa was born Jelita Septriasa in Jakarta, Indonesia, on 1 September 1989 to Sagitta Ahimshah and Rita Emza; she is the third daughter of their six children. Her younger sister, Juwita Maritsa, who resembles her, is also an actress. She did her schooling at Muhammadiyah Elementary School 6 from 1995 to 2001, then State Junior High School 73 from 2001 to 2004; both are in Tebet, South Jakarta. Her high school was State Senior High School 82, Jakarta, which she attended from 2004 to 2007.

Acha Septriasa began her career in modelling as the Gadis Sampul pageant, held by the teen magazine Gadis in 2004. Her first film role was in 2005's Apa Artinya Cinta? (What is the Meaning of Love?), in which she had a supporting role. The following year, she rose to fame with the success of Heart, in which she starred opposite Nirina Zubir and her then-boyfriend Irwansyah. She also sang for the soundtrack album together with Irwansyah which produced by Melly Goeslaw and her husband, got double platinum; two of her singles, "Sampai Menutup Mata" ("Until I Close My Eyes") and the duet "My Heart", received international airplay.

The following year, Acha Septriasa and Irwansyah starred in the teen romance Love is Cinta. She also sang a duet with him for the film. That same year she was identified as the fourth highest-paid Indonesian actress, at Rp. 180 million (US$15,000) per film. She released her first solo album, Keputusan Hati (Heart's Decision), in August 2009. That same year she hosted the Indonesian variety show Dahsyat and played a role in Krazy Crazy Krezy.

In 2010. Acha Septriasa starred opposite Ayu Azhari and Julia Perez in Sst... Jadikan Aku Simpanan (Sst... Make Me Your Mistress). She also released Menembus Impian (Achieving Dreams).

As of 2011, Acha Septriasa is studying film production at Limkokwing University in Kuala Lumpur, she also frequently returns to Indonesia; she shot her role for Love Story, a story based on a traditional legend, opposite Irwansyah, while still taking classes in Malaysia. As of 2011 she has no plans to release a new album, as it is too time-consuming. In 2012 she announced that after finishing her studies she intended to work an office job; however, that same year she was cast in two films, which she worked on first.

== Style ==
Acha Septriasa is known for portraying girl next door type characters in her films. As such, she mostly prefers to keep her hair light brown or chestnut.

== Personal life ==
Acha Septriasa formerly dated her Heart and Love is Cinta co-star, Irwansyah; they broke up in 2008. Her friends circle are mostly male.

Acha Septriasa enjoys playing sports and travelling. She started learning to swim at the age of one, then took up football in junior high school and on the contrary, she became the basketball team captain in high school. She also enjoys cycling and regularly plays futsal with her friends. She uses long holidays to travel, and often travels abroad.

Acha Septriasa married Vicky Kharisma on 11 December 2016 in Jakarta. The couple met during their higher studies in Malaysia. The couple divorced on 19 May 2025.

== Filmography ==
=== Film ===
- Apa Artinya Cinta? (What is the Meaning of Love?) (2005)
- Heart (2006)
- Love is Cinta (2007)
- In the Name of Love (2008)
- Love (2008)
- Krazy Crazy Krezy (2009)
- Kado Spesial Buat Kakak (Special Gift for Sister) (2009)
- Sst... Jadikan Aku Simpanan (Sst... Make Me Your Mistress) (2010)
- Menembus Impian (Achieving Dreams) (2010)
- Love Story (2011)
- Test Pack (2012)
- Broken Hearts (2012)
- Recto Verso (2012)
- 99 Cahaya di Langit Eropa (2013–2014)
- Bangun Lagi dong Lupus (2013)
- Lamaran (2014)
- Bulan Terbelah di Langit Amerika (2015–2016)
- Koala Kumal (2016)
- Sabtu Bersama Bapak (2016)
- Shy Shy Cat (2016)
- Kartini (2017)
- Jaga Pocong (2018)
- Hanum & Rangga (2018)
- 99 Nama Cinta (2019)
- Daemon Mind (2021)
- June & Kopi (2021)
- Layla Majnun (2021)
- Anwar: The Untold Story (2023)
- Qodrat 2 (2025)

=== Discography ===
- OST Heart (2006)
- OST Love is Cinta (2007)
- Keputusan Hati (Heart's Decision) (2009)
- Kimi no Tameni (2021) (labeled by Pony Canyon)

=== TV shows ===
- INBOX (SCTV)
- !nsert (Trans TV)
- dahSyat (RCTI)

=== Adverstiments ===
- Natur-E
- Citra Soap
- Kapal Api
- Lactamil
- Bodrex Migra

== Awards and nominations ==
Year	Award	Category	Nominated work	Result	Ref.
2011	Indonesian Film Festival	Citra Award for Best Leading Actress	Love is Cinta	Nominated	
2011	Bandung Film Festival	Best Actress in a Leading Role	Love Story	Won	
2012	Indonesian Film Festival	Citra Award for Best Leading Actress	Test Pack	Won	
2012	Maya Award	Best Actress in a Leading Role	Test Pack	Nominated	
2013	Maya Award	Best Actress in an Omnibus	Rectoverso	Nominated	
2014	Maya Award	Best Actress in an Omnibus	Aku Cinta Kamu	Won	
2016	Maya Award	Best Actress in a Supporting Role	Shy Shy Cat	Nominated	
