= Omaswati =

Indonesian actress and comedian (1966–2020)

Omas
- Born: 3 May 1966; Jakarta, Indonesia
- Died: 16 July 2020 (aged 54); Depok, Indonesia
- Occupations: actress, comedian, Betawi lenong performer
- Years active: 1995–2020

Omaswati, also known as Omas (3 May 1966 – 16 July 2020) was an Indonesian television actress and comedian, also known as a performer of lenong, a theatrical form of the Betawi people.

== Career ==
She began her career performing traditional Betawi lenong. She became nationally known through her frequent television appearances, using her signature frankly spoken comedic style as a character actor in sinetrons as well as in comedy programs and talk shows.

== Personal life and death ==
Omas was born in Jakarta to local parents. She was the sister of popular Indonesian comedians and also lenong performers Mandra and Mastur. All three were inspired to enter the theater by their older siblings who had done so before them.

Omas died on 16 July 2020, in Depok. The cause of death was lung disease, from which she had been suffering for some months and for which she had been hospitalized repeatedly. She left three children, Muhammad Rizky Dioambiah, Dinda Olivia, and Dimas Aji Septian.

== TV series ==
Title	Year	Role	Ref.
Jodoh Apa Bodoh	2004	Vina	
Insyaf			
Bayangan Adinda			
Matahariku		Omas	
Iman			
Upik Abu dan Laura	2008		
Cinta Fitri (Season 7)	2011	Nyak Marzuki	
Yang Muda Yang Bercinta	2013	Ipeh	
Akibat Pernikahan Dini	2013	House renter	
Anak Anak Manusia	2013	Ysabel	
Kecil-Kecil Mikir Jadi Manten	2018	Omaz Mo	
Fatih di Kampung Jawara		Putri Nyengnyong	

== Television programs ==
- ASAL (Asli Atau Palsu) - TRANS 7
