= Mike Lewis (model) =

Indonesian actor and model (born 1981)

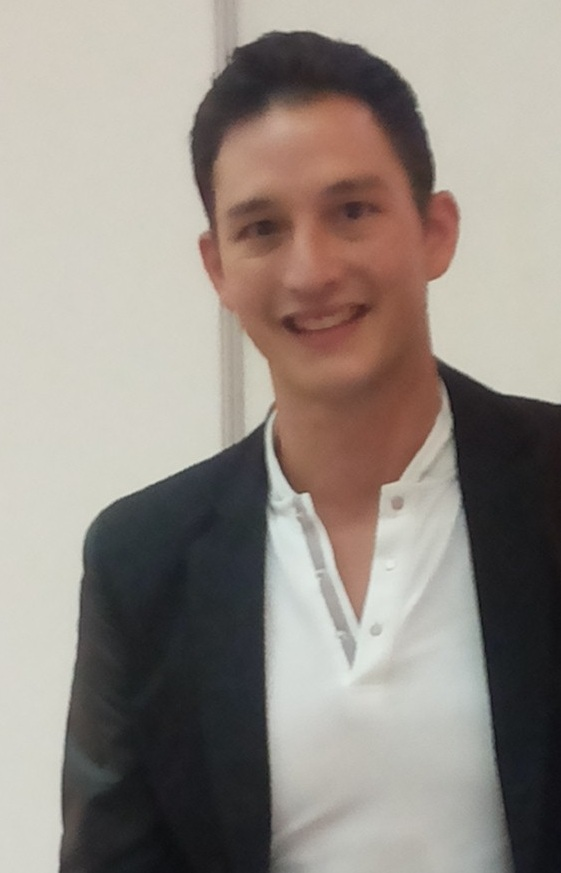
- Born: 22 October 1981 (age 44); Tokyo, Japan
- Occupations: Actor, model
- Years active: 2001–present
- Known for: The Sexiest Cosmo Man for 2004

Michael George William Lewis (born 22 October 1981) is an Indonesian actor and model. His father is a Canadian diplomat, while his mother is of Chinese-Malaysian descent. When he was still in high school, Lewis' father was stationed at the Canadian embassy in Jakarta. As of 2018, Lewis resides in the Indonesian capital.

== Career ==
Besides working for several Indonesian agencies, Lewis also works for Specs Model Management Agency in Montreal, Canada, and as a staff member of the Canadian embassy in Indonesia. In 2003, he got his first big-screen role in the Indonesian film 5 Sehat 4 Sempurna. He was named "The Sexiest Cosmo Man" by Cosmopolitan magazine for two years in a row, in 2004 and 2005.

== Asia's Next Top Model, season 4 ==
Lewis took part in the fourth season of Asia's Next Top Model in 2016.

== Filmography ==
=== Film ===
- 5 Sehat 4 Sempurna (2002)
- Suster Ngesot (2007)
- The God Babe (2010)
- Hafalan Shalat Delisa (2011)
- Dead Mine (2012)
- Suka Suka Super Seven dan Idola Cilik dalam (2014)
- Habis Gelap Menuju Terang (2014)
- The Night Comes for Us (2018)
- Message Man (2018)
- Foxtrot Six (2019)

=== Television ===
- Cinta Jangan Buru-Buru (2007)
- Cinta Fitri (2007)
- Bunga (2007)
- Yasmin (2008)
- Larasati (2008)
- Dia atau Diriku (2011)
- Putih Abu-Abu (2012)
- Cinta Bersemi di Putih Abu-Abu the Series (2012)
- Cowokku Superboy (2014)
- Ganteng Ganteng Serigala (2014)
