= Virgin 2 (film) =

Virgin 2 – Bukan Film Porno
- Directed by: Nayato Fio Nuala
- Screenplay by: Chiska Doppert, Eka D. Sitorus, & Ian S.
- Based on: True Story
- Produced by: Chand Parvez Servia
- Starring: Joanna Alexandra; Christina Santika; Yama Carlos; Inong; Smitha Anjani; Wichita Satari; Ramon Y. Tungka; Neyna Lisa Barlett; Ari Sudarsono; Iqbal Azhari
- Cinematography: Freddy A. Lingga
- Edited by: Tiara Puspa Rani
- Music by: Tya Subiakto Satrio
- Production company: Starvision Plus
- Distributed by: Starvision Plus
- Release date: May 28, 2009
- Running time: 91 minutes
- Country: Indonesia
- Language: Indonesian

Virgin 2 – Bukan Film Porno (Indonesian for Virgin 2 – Not a Porn Film) is a 2009 Indonesian film, based on true story. The film was directed by Nayato Fio Nuala, written by Chiska Doppert, Eka D. Sitorus, & Ian S. and stars Joanna Alexandra, Christina Santika, Yama Carlos, Wichita Satari, Smitha Anjani, Neyna Lisa Barlett, and Andrew Rox Ralphbourgh. This film was released on May 28, 2009.

== Plot ==
Virgin 2, a story of two female teenagers forced into ill-fated professions: Tina (Christina Santika) and Nadya (Joanna Alexandra). Nadya, Mitha (Smitha Anjani) and Raymond (Ramon Y. Tungka)who have been friends since high school do not have a “good grip on life” coming from families that lack harmony. Raymond becomes imprisoned due to drugs and unknowingly leaves Nadya pregnant. Mitha enticed by the allure of escaping reality turns to drugs leading to addiction and massive debt. Nadya tries to save Mitha, whether the money comes from her work as a Disc Jockey or by other shortcuts. Tina, driven from home by her jealous mother becomes involved with Steffie who provides her a room in her apartment. Unknown to Tina, Steffie is a teen that measures everything with money, leaving no room for no room for morality. Tina's life is further pushed into darkness when she is given to Yama (Yama Carlos), raped, and then pimped off to men. Tina manages to escape and in turn meets Nadya. Together they face the hardships of their increasingly darkening world filled with lucrative neon signs.

This was not their choice, because they had no choice.

== Production ==
The film was produced in early January 2009. The film's producer, Chand Parwez Servia, emphasized the "bukan film porno" ("not a porn film") tagline to show that the film is made for educational purposes. The soundtrack consists of the songs "Dia" by Budi, a band from Bandung, "Kuingin" and "Rock n Roll" by Sixx Band, and "Terlantar" by Bintang Band.

== Reception ==
According to Aguslia Hidayah from Tempo, this film does not have a clear message, as compared to the previous film in the series, Virgin, which tells teenagers to avoid promiscuity. "Nayato is focused into unraveling the story, which is said to be a true story from the character Nadya, and forgot to sharpen the message itself," she said.
