= Heart (2006 film) =

- Directed by: Hanny Saputra
- Starring: Nirina Zubir; Irwansyah; Acha Septriasa; Salma Paramitha; Unique Priscilla; Rachel Amanda; Irshadi Bagas
- Music by: Melly Goeslaw; Anto Hoed
- Distributed by: Kharisma Starvision Plus
- Release date: 11 May 2006
- Running time: 125 minutes
- Country: Indonesia
- Language: Indonesian

Heart is a 2006 Indonesian film directed by Hanny R Saputra and starring Nirina Zubir, Irwansyah and Acha Septriasa. The film's soundtrack features the popular duet "My Heart" between Irwansyah and Acha Septriasa, which won Best Song at the MTV Indonesia Movie Awards in 2006. Heart also won Most Favourite Movie and Most Favourite Heart Melting Moment at the awards show.

== Plot ==
Heart is the story of childhood friends Rachel (Nirina Zubir) and Farel (Irwansyah). When Farel confesses he has fallen for new girl Luna (Acha Septriasa) Rachel's jealousy and anger results in a horrific accident. Rachel finds herself in the same hospital as Luna who is suffering from a heart condition and she witnesses the extent of Farel and Luna's love for each other. Now Rachel must decide if she can make the ultimate sacrifice for her best friend and the man she loves.

== Cast ==
- Nirina Zubir - Rachel
- Irwansyah - Farel
- Acha Septriasa - Luna
- Rachel Amanda - little Rachel
- Irshadi Bagas - little Farel
- Ari Sihasale - Adam (Luna's father)
- Unique Priscilla - Rahayu (Rachel's mother)

== Soundtrack ==
The score was played by the China Philharmonic Orchestra conducted by Aksan Sjuman.

=== Track listing ===
==== Songs ====
No.	Title	Performer(s)	Length
1.	"My Heart"	Irwansyah & Acha Septriasa
2.	"Pecinta Wanita"	Irwansyah
3.	"Kehilangan" (Guitar version)
4.	"Sampai Menutup Mata"	Acha Septriasa
5.	"Perempuanku"	Irwansyah
6.	"Berdua Lebih Baik"	Acha Septriasa
7.	"Hari Ini, Esok Dan Seterusnya (H.E.S.)"	Nirina Zubir
8.	"My Heart" (Guitar version)
9.	"Menghitung Hari 2"	Anda Permana
10.	"Kehilangan"	Christina The

==== Scores ====
No.	Title	Length
1.	"My Heart"
2.	"Chasing Death"
3.	"When in Bandung Crater Lake"
4.	"Playing Basketball in the Forest"
5.	"Sampai Menutup Mata"
