= Unique Priscilla =

Indonesian model and actress

- Born: Unique Priscilla Mauretha Hadisoemartho; 21 September 1970 (age 56); Jakarta, Indonesia
- Other name: Cilla
- Education: University of Kansas
- Occupations: Actress, model
- Years active: 1985-present
- Notable work: Kuldesak; Heart; This Is Cinta
- Spouses: Bucek Depp (m. 2001; div. 2007); Aminzar Rifky Zarkoni (m. 2008; div. 2018)
- Children: 2
- Parent(s): Kusbanu Hadisoemarto (father); Baby Maureen Nanlohy (mother)

Unique Priscilla Mauretha Hadisoemartho (born 21 September 1970), better known as Cilla, is an Indonesian model and actress.

== Biography ==
Unique Priscilla was born in Jakarta (21 September 1970) to Kusbanu Hadisoemarto from Madiun and Baby Maureen Nanlohy of Ambon, she is the eldest of two children of the couple. she began her modeling career in 1985 for the fashion magazine, Covergirl.

She graduated in 1993 from the University of Kansas in School of Journalism and Mass Communications. Before becoming an actress, she started her career as a TV presenter for television channels RCTI and SCTV. She was chosen by director Garin Nugroho in 1996 to star in the TV movie Angin Rumput Savana, the film won in 1997 the award for best TV drama at the Singapore Film Festival.

== Personal life ==
Unique Priscilla met actor Bucek Depp in 1997 on the set of the series Anak Menteng, they were married on 6 January 2001 by the laws of the Islam and Christianity. This interfaith marriage ended in divorce because of Bucek's repetitive cheating, which led him to leave home early in January 2007. The two had a daughter together, Arla Ailani Muchtar, who went to live with her mother after the collapse of their household.

She quickly married again in 2008 with Aminzar Rifky Zarkoni (born 14 May 1968), the Director of PT. Odira ENERGY Persada, a company that participates in the development of oil and natural gas in Indonesia. The couple have a son, Danial Altan Nubhuani, born in 2009.

Her family property located in Ciputat, Tangerang, has over forty-five different species of animals including tigers, leopards and bears. Her late father had been thus nicknamed by the neighborhood "Si Raja Hutan" ("The King of the Jungle") because of this exotic collection.

== Filmography ==
=== Filmography ===
- Kuldesak (1998)
- Virgin (2004)
- Mirror (2005)
- Heart (2006)
- Hantu Bangku Kosong (2006)
- Love is Cinta (2007)
- Raga 11.11.11 (2011)
- This Is Cinta (2015)
- Surga Di Telapak Kaki Ibu (2016)
- Raksasa dari Jogja (2016)
- Nona (2020)
- Kukira Kau Rumah (2022)
- Like & Share (2022)
- Hidayah (2023)

=== Television ===
- Aku, Perempuan dan Lelaki Itu
- Kafe Biru
- Anak Menteng
- Permata Hati
- Pacar Pilihan
- Angin Rumput Savana
- Bingkisan Untuk Presiden
- Sepanjang Jalan Kenangan
- Mata Ketiga
- Sherina
- Dunia Tanpa Koma
- Cinta dan Julia
- Heart (series 1)
- Heart Series 2
- Cinta Salsabilla
- Marmut Merah Jambu Series

=== Film Television ===
- Angin Rumput Savana
- Positive +
- Di Batas Waktu
