= Moga Bunda Disayang Allah =

2013 Indonesian drama film

- Theatrical release poster
- Directed by: Jose Poernomo
- Screenplay by: Riheam Junianti
- Produced by: Rocky Soraya; Ram Soraya
- Starring: Fedi Nuril; Shandy Aulia; Alya Rohali; Donny Damara; Chantika Zahra
- Edited by: Sastha Sunu
- Music by: Melly Goeslaw
- Production company: Soraya Intercine Films
- Distributed by: Soraya Intercine Films; Iflix Originals
- Release date: August 2, 2013
- Running time: 90 minutes
- Country: Indonesia
- Language: Indonesian

Moga Bunda Disayang Allah (transl. May Ma Be Blessed By Allah) is a 2013 Indonesian family drama film directed by Jose Poernomo. It stars Fedi Nuril, Shandy Aulia, Alya Rohali, Donny Damara, Chantika Zahra, and Iang Darmawan. Based upon Tere Liye's novel of the same name, it tells the story of Karang, a man traumatized by an accident involving children who became the "psychologist" of a neurologically disabled child. The film was released on August 2, 2013, to mixed reviews by critics, who commented on the inconsistent plot.

== Plot ==
Karang, a Muslim man, is well known among the locals for creating a learning and social space for children. One day, he takes the children on a cruise, which fails to face a thunderstorm-induced wave and sinks. Karang, disturbed by the children's agony, escapes by jumping off. He experiences intense survivor guilt, which strains his relationship with a woman named Kinarsih.

Karang leaves the city for a private villa of the HK family at a remote town. He is tasked to treat Melati, a girl whose ability to interact is affected by severe head trauma. Karang shouts on her ear when she is unable to follow commands, aggressing her when she still does not. Mr. MK, Melati's father deems Karang abusive, and Karang repeatedly leaves and re-enters the job, uncertain on his will to cure Melati. Exposed as an alcoholic, Mr. MK permanently bans Karang shortly before flying to Frankfurt for his business as an airline CEO. His wife Mrs. MK secretly gives Karang a chance after Melati is able to eat with cutlery, and through teamwork does Melati show more progress. Upon return, Mr. MK sees Karang to his shock, but compliments him after Melati is able to speak when a word is written in her hand.

The family bring Karang on a holiday at an island. On the way home, a car has a near collision with their bus, clinging it at the edge of a bridge. Karang does a weight distribution initiative, but the bus flips and falls into the river. Everyone survives; Karang opined that this time, everyone survives because of his belief that Allah will not test His children beyond their limitations. 20 years later, Karang is a businessman married to Kinarsih with three children. Melati is able to interact using the Indonesian Sign Language and graduates college.

== Background and release ==
Moga Bunda Disayang Allah is an adaptation of Tere Liye's novel of the same name. It is inspired by Helen Keller, whose senses became disabled at the age of 19. Hellen was then taught by Anne Sullivan until she is able to sense again. The music in the film is composed by Melly Goeslaw.

It was released theatrically on August 8, 2013. In 2020, along with many Indonesian films, it was added to Disney+ Hotstar.

== Reception and accolade ==
Kompasiana praised the actors for their lively performance, but called out its confusing setting, and called the fact that Karang is able to buy so many wines irrational.

The film won the Citra Awards as film with the best visual effects in 2013.
