= Irwansyah =

Indonesian actor and singer (born 1985)

- Born: Irwansyah; 6 March 1985 (age 41); Jakarta, Indonesia
- Occupation: Singer
- Years active: 2002–present
- Label: Warner Music Indonesia
- Spouse: Zaskia Sungkar (m. 2011)

Irwansyah (born 6 March 1985) is an Indonesian actor and singer. Irwansyah released his first solo album, Soliter, in 2008.

== Biography ==
Irwansyah was born in Jakarta on 6 March 1985. He has two younger brothers, Hafiz and Andhika. He started his acting career in sinetron, appearing in Senandung Masa Puber, Pacarku Superstar (My Lover is a Superstar), and Ku T'lah Jatuh Cinta (I've Fallen in Love).

Irwansyah starred in 2006's Heart alongside his then-girlfriend Acha Septriasa. He also sang for the film's soundtrack, including the solo "Pecinta Wanita" ("Womanizer") and the duet "Heart". The album went double platinum. The following year he starred in Love is Cinta with Septriasa, and in 2008 he released his first solo album Soliter (Solitary), produced by Melly Goeslaw and her husband Anto Hoed. The album contained a song written by Irwansyah, "Lagu Untukmu" ("Song for You"), as well as the hit single "Kutunggu Jandamu" ("I'll Wait for You to be a Widow").

In the 2009 legislative election, Irwansyah was unsuccessful in his bid for a seat in the People's Representative Council with the Prosperous Indonesia Party.

In 2011, he starred opposite Septriasa again in Love Story, a film based on a traditional folktale. Despite being former lovers, the two were reported to have worked professionally together. His most recent film is Mudik (Go Home), which was released in late 2011.

== Filmography ==
- Heart (2006)
- Love is Cinta (2007)
- Lantai 13 (2007)
- Love (2008)
- 40 Hari Bangkitnya Pocong (2008)
- Love Story (2010)
- Mudik (Go Home; 2011)
- Wanita Tetap Wanita (2013)
- Roh Fasik (2019)

== Awards ==
- Movie Love Is Cinta (2007) – Starvision as Leading Actor OST Album Love Is Cinta Singer and Composer (some songs in the OST)
- RCTI Indonesian Movie Award 2007 – Winner Favourite OST Album
- SCTV Indonesia Music Award 2007 – Best New Artist Nominee APM Music Award Singapore 2007
- Best New Male Artist
- Best New Duo Artist Most Famous Young Artist
- Malaysia Minister Award for Most Famous Indonesia Young Artist 2007
- The MOST FAVORITE MALE MTV 2006
- Kymco motorcycle 2007 : media TV, print, radio, pos, print ad & billboard
- Double Platinum Award (65,000 copies) – Warner Music Malaysia August 2006 – OST Heart
- Multi Platinum Award (5 Platinum) – Warner Music Malaysia June 2007 – OST Heart
- Double Platinum Award (450,000 copies) – Warner Music Indonesia 2006 – OST Heart OST Album Heart Singer (3 songs of total 8 album songs)
- MTV Movie Award 2006 – My Heart Best Song in the Movie
- MTV Movie Award 2006 – Heart Best Favorite Movie
- MTV Music Award 2006 – My Heart Best New Artist Nominee
- Nominasi Penyanyi Pop Pria Terpopuler 2011 – Indosat Awards
- Nominasi Pasangan Paling Inbox With Zaskia Sungkar – Inbox Awards 2012
