= Nirina Zubir =

Indonesian actress

- Born: Nirina Raudhatul Jannah Zubir; Antananarivo, Democratic Republic of Madagascar (now Madagascar)
- Other name: Nirina Zubir
- Occupations: Actress; Presenter
- Years active: 2002–present
- Spouse: Ernest Fardiyan Syarif (m. 2009)
- Children: Zivara Ruciragati Syarif; Elzo Jaydo Anvaya
- Parent(s): Zubir Amin (father); Cut Indria Marzuki (mother)
- Awards: Citra Award for Best Leading Actress

Nirina Raudhatul Jannah Zubir, better known simply as Nirina Zubir, is an Indonesian actress and television presenter of Minangkabau descent.

== Life ==
Nirina was born in Antananarivo, Madagascar to expatriate Indonesian parents of ethnic Minangkabau as well as Acehnese origin hailing from Pariaman, West Sumatra and East Aceh Regency, Acheh, where her father, Zubir Amin was attached as a senior diplomat with the Indonesian Embassy in that country at the time of her birth. Her name means "a special given one" in the Malagasy language with the Arabic words of her middle name(s) meaning paradiseful garden, referring to the Masjid an-Nabawi, one of the two holiest sites in Islam, the other being Masjidil Haram and she was registered at birth as Nirina Raudhatul Jannah Zubir.

Nirina graduated from the STIE Perbanas School of Economics. She eventually looked for other options as soon as graduation. She admitted to never imagining becoming a radio DJ. Her first career at MTVonSky radio station (now MTV Sky) was a coincidence. According to Nirina, it was her friends who applied to MTVonSky under her name.

Her friends' move turned into a major change in her life. Quite beyond her expectations, MTVonSky hired Nirina because of her distinctive personality.

“So there was my [first] opportunity [in the entertainment world].”

That first opportunity had led Nirina to bigger and better things. After landing one of the coolest jobs around — MTV video jockey — Nirina quickly gained fame. Her other talents were then noticed, including her ability to speak Mandarin, which she learned while living in Hong Kong and China for several years as a child. Former president Megawati Sukarnoputri even asked Nirina to become her personal interpreter during the 2000 Indonesian visit by the Chinese vice president. Her popularity then led to some movie roles, including in 30 Hari Mencari Cinta (30 Days to Find Love) and Mirror.

And it wouldn’t be Nirina if she didn’t have plenty of things to pursue. Her rising popularity as an MTV VJ for Indonesia tickled her ambitious side to think of spreading her wings onto the international scene. As her contract with MTV Indonesia neared its end, Nirina made plans: She was eyeing the position of international VJ for MTV Southeast Asia.

“The thing is, I wouldn’t give up on that. Not until they told me: ‘Enough, ‘Na [short for Nirina]’," she once said of her ambitious plan.

The ambitious plan was never realized. After resigning from MTV Indonesia in 2005, Nirina’s international VJ career never materialized. Instead, she hosted several TV shows and starred in more movies, including Belahan Jiwa (Soul Mate), Heart, Kamulah Satu-satunya (You’re the Only One), Get Married and again in her latest release, Get Married 2.

Nirina has continued to grow as an actress, receiving several awards, including the prestigious 2006 Indonesian Film Festival Award and the 2008 Indonesia Movie Award — both for best actress.

Looking back at her achievements, Nirina realizes now how she truly fell in love with performing arts.

Nirina studied for a bachelor's degree in Management Banking at the STIE Perbanas Kuningan, in Jakarta before beginning as a model. She is fluent in her native and national Indonesian language, English as well as Mandarin Chinese.

She made her full film debut in 2004 in the film 30 hari mencari cinta playing the role of Gwen.

In 2007, she played the lead role in the comedy film Kamulah satu-satunya.

Besides her acting career she has presented a number of Indonesian mainstream TV shows and has modelled in many adverts commercially in the country including for, Herbal Essences (2005–2006).

== Filmography ==
- 30 Hari Mencari Cinta (2004) as Gwen
- Mirror (2005) as Kikan
- Belahan Jiwa (2005) as Baby Blue and Baby Pink
- Heart (2006) as Rachel
- Kamulah Satu-Satunya (2007) as Indah
- Love Is Cinta (2007) as Reporter
- Get Married (2007) as Maemunah
- Get Married 2 (2010) as Maemunah
- Get Married 3 (2011) as Maemunah
- Purple Love (2011) as Talita
- Bidadari-Bidadari Surga (2012) as Laisa
- Cemara's Family (2018) as Emak
- Ali & Ratu Ratu Queens (2021) as Party
- Paranoia (2021) as Dina
- Cemara's Family 2 (2022) as Emak
- Falling In Love Like In Movies (2023) as Hana
- Better Off Dead (2025) as Ayu
- Ratu Ratu Queens: The Series (2025) as Party

== Sinetron ==
- Untukmu Segalanya (1994)
- Untukmu Segalanya 2 (1996)
- Tersanjung 1-6 (1998)
- Diva (2008)
- Assalamualaikum Cinta (2008)

== Commercial ==
- L'Oréal (2002)
- Toyota Yaris (2006)

== Magazine ==
- Kawanku Magazine, February 2002
- Seventeen Magazine, September 2003
- Fit Magazine, April 2004
- Hai Magazine, October 2005

== Music Video Model ==
- Sheila On 7 - Melompat Lebih Tinggi
- Sheila On 7 - Berhenti Berharap
- Gigi - Perihal Cinta
- Acha Septriasa & Irwansyah - My Heart
- Nidji - Sudah
- Slank - Pandangan Pertama
- Slank - Cubit2tan
- Slank - PLIS

== Song ==
- Hari Ini, Esok dan Seterusnya (2006)

== Hosts ==
- Indonesian Idol (Season 4)
- Anugerah Planet Muzik (Music Planet Award)

== Awards and nominations ==
Year	Award	Category	Work	Result
2004	MTV Indonesia Movie Awards	Most Favorite Actress	30 Hari Mencari Cinta	Won
2005	Indonesian Movie Awards	Favorite Actress	Mirror	Won
2006	Indonesian Movie Awards	Best Actress	Heart	Won
2006	Indonesian Film Festival	Citra Award for Best Leading Actress	Heart	Won
2007	Indonesian Film Festival	Citra Award for Best Leading Actress	Kamulah Satu-Satunya	Nominated
2007	Indonesian Movie Awards	Best Actress	Get Married	Nominated
2009	Indonesian Movie Awards	Best Actress	Get Married 2	Nominated
2014	Indonesian Film Festival	Citra Award for Best Supporting Actress	Silent Hero(es)	Nominated
2018	Maya Award	Best Actress in a Leading Role	Keluarga Cemara	Nominated
2019	Indonesian Film Festival	Citra Award for Best Leading Actress	Keluarga Cemara	Nominated
2024	Indonesian Film Festival	Citra Award for Best Leading Actress	Falling In Love Like In Movies	Won

== External links and sources ==
- Nirina Zubir at IMDb
