= Zaskia Sungkar =

Indonesian actress and singer

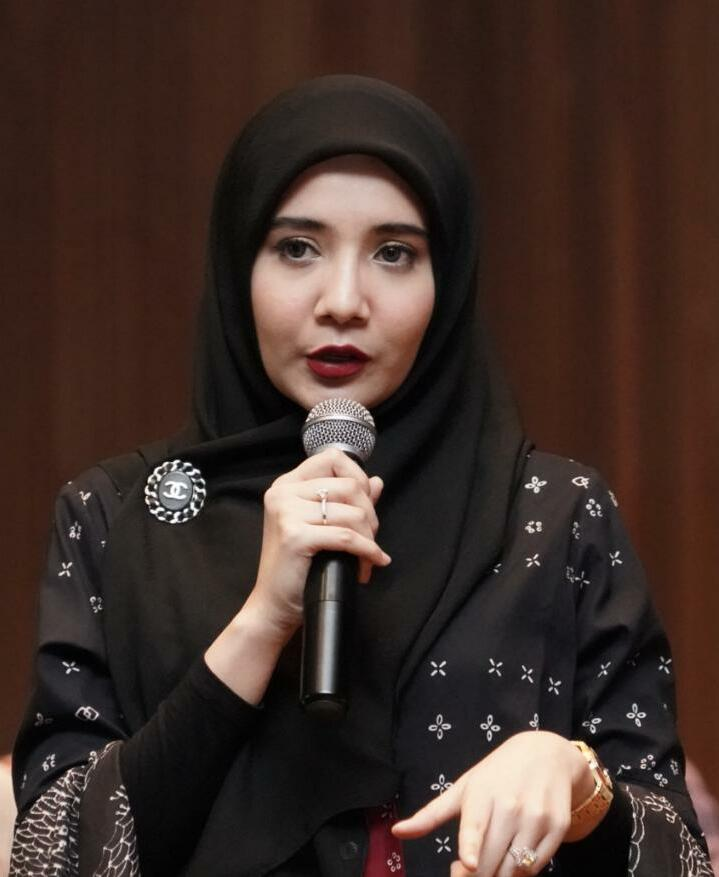
- Born: Zaskia Rahma Sungkar; 22 December 1990 (age 35); Jakarta, Indonesia
- Occupations: Actress singer fashion designer
- Spouse: Irwansyah (m. 2011)
- Parent: Mark Sungkar (father)
- Relatives: Shireen Sungkar (sister)

Zaskia Rahma Sungkar or better known as Zaskia Sungkar (born in Jakarta, Indonesia on 22 December 1990) is an Indonesian actress and singer of mixed Yemeni and Minangkabau descent.

== Early life and family ==
Sungkar was born in Jakarta on 22 December 1990. She is the eldest child of actor Mark Sungkar and Fanny Bauty. Her younger sister, Shireen Sungkar, is also an actress.

== Career ==
Sungkar entered the entertainment industry after her younger sister, but encountered more resistance from their father. While Shireen went into acting, Zaskia began with singing; in 2008 the two founded The Sisters. They released a self-titled album that year, with the single "Keajaiban Cinta" ("Love's Miracle") receiving national airplay. The following year, she began acting in several sinetron, including Terlanjur Cinta (Too Far in Love), Seruni, and Koboi Cabe Rawit (Bird's Eye Chili Cowboy).

After her marriage to actor Irwansyah, Sungkar released a single with him and they have presented on television together.

Sungkar opened her first venture, the Khalifa Kindergarten Centre in Bintaro, Tangerang, with her sister.

She has stated that she does not want to act in any more sinetron, although she would consider television or feature films, and intends to continue singing.

== Personal life ==
Sungkar married Irwansyah on 15 January 2011 in the Padang style. They had begun dating in May 2010 and became engaged on 8 December that year. For their honeymoon they went on an umrah to Mecca. She has two children.

Sungkar has stated that she prefers working over partying, as she enjoys the financial independence. However, she is considered to be less famous than her younger sister.
