= The Voice Indonesia season 4 =

The Voice Indonesia
- Season 4
- Hosted by: Ananda Omesh; Gracia Indri
- Coaches: Armand Maulana; Titi DJ; Anindyo Baskoro & Vidi Aldiano (duo); Isyana Sarasvati; Gamaliel Tapiheru (Comeback Stage)
- Winner: Vionita Veronika
- Winning coach: Titi DJ
- Runner-up: Elly Chia

Release
- Original network: GTV
- Original release: August 29 – November 28, 2019

Season chronology
- ← Previous; Season 3

The fourth season of the Indonesian reality singing competition The Voice Indonesia premiered on August 29, 2019, on GTV. Armand Maulana, Titi DJ, Anindyo Baskoro and Vidi Aldiano all returned as coaches from the previous season, whereas Isyana Sarasvati debuted as a new coach, replacing Anggun. Ananda Omesh returned for his second season as host, alongside Gracia Indri, who replaced Astrid Tiar.

Vionita Veronika won the competition and became the first female to win the show, she also became the second stolen artist to win, following Mario G. Klau in season 2. Titi DJ became the first female coach to win the show and also for the first time the top 4 were all female.

== Audition ==
Auditions were held in 18 cities in Indonesia from April 5 till May 5, 2019. Otherwise, online auditions start from May 6 until May 26, 2019, via Metube.id.

Type of audition	City	Date	Location	Ref.
Special Audition	Karawang	April 5, 2019	Radio Flamboyan Karawang	
Open Audition	Malang	April 6, 2019	STMIK Asia Malang	
Open Audition	Banjarmasin	April 6, 2019	Treepark Hotel Pekanbaru	
Open Audition	Denpasar	April 6, 2019	Phoenix Radio Bali	
Special Audition	Indramayu	April 7, 2019	Radio Megaswara Indramayu	
Special Audition	Cirebon	April 8, 2019	Pilaradio Cirebon	
Special Audition	Majalengka	April 11, 2019	Thomson Radio Gamma FM Majalengka	
Big Audition	Bandung	April 13, 2019	Hotel Horison Bandung	
Open Audition	Kupang	April 13, 2019	Hotel Sotis Kupang	
Open Audition	Medan	April 13, 2019	Ibis Styles Pattimura Ambon	
Open Audition	Gorontalo	April 20, 2019	Hotel TC Damhil Universitas Negeri Gorontalo	
Open Audition	Mataram	April 20, 2019	Aston Inn Mataram	
Open Audition	Yogyakarta	April 20, 2019	Hotel Pesonna Tugu	
Big Audition	Surabaya	April 27, 2019	Hotel Batiqa	
Open Audition	Pekanbaru	April 27, 2019	Hotel Mutiara Merdeka	
Open Audition	Maumere	April 27, 2019	Hotel Go Maumere	
Open Audition	Makassar	May 4 & 5, 2019	Hotel Pesonna Makassar	
Big Audition	Jakarta	May 4 & 5, 2019	MNC Studios Kebon Jeruk	

== Coaches and hosts ==
In July 2019, it was announced that Armand Maulana, Titi DJ, Vidi Aldiano and Anindyo Baskoro who were judges in the previous season, would return. Anggun, also a coach in the previous season, did not return and was replaced by Isyana Sarasvati.

Ananda Omesh returned for his second season as host, while Gracia Indri replaced Astrid Tiar as co-host.

== Teams ==
Color Key

Main Competition

- Winner
- Runner-up
- Third place
- Fourth place
- Fifth place
- Eliminated in the Live Shows
- Eliminated in the Playoffs
- Eliminated but selected to participate in The Comeback Stage
- Eliminated in the Battles
- Stolen in the Knockouts
- Eliminated in the Knockouts

The Comeback Stage

- Joined another team
- Eliminated in the Battle, Round 2
- Eliminated in the Battle, Round 1
- Eliminated in the Knockouts

Coaches	Top 89					
Armand Maulana						
Armand Maulana	Elly Chia	Bagus Agung	Suci Yantini	**Jordie Yose**	Trianetha Henuk	Chissamary Husono
Armand Maulana	Elsha Graciela	Truly Patty	Yakobus Ndopo	~~Yohannes Williem~~	Alvin Wardiman	Aura Shofia
Armand Maulana	Dhani Ramadhan	Firdha Rachmadhani	Ical Jenggo	Julian Melchior	Malida Nielsen	Nadia Agatha
Armand Maulana	Nura Irina	Patricia Celine	Sintha Inara	Sisca & Jun	Vien Audrey	—
Titi DJ						
Titi DJ	Vionita Veronika	Genya Kurnain	Ferlita Ningtias	Wijaya Kusuma	Glorivay Assa	Rafi Hamzah
Titi DJ	Sakthi Moi	Widya Angela	Annisa Lubis	Ari Anggara	David Febrian	Elisabeth Devina
Titi DJ	Ersya Purnama	Eunike Freskilia	Givania Angelica	Herald Claren	Kania Zepty	Meidiana Putri
Titi DJ	Nadia Dharmawan^{a}	Nicolas Siregar	Razita Puti	Shaly Syina	—	—
Anindyo Baskoro & Vidi Aldiano						
Anindyo Baskoro & Vidi Aldiano	Tesalonika Manalu	Natasya & Hizkia^{b}	Belinda Khaerana	Gery & Ganhy	~~Jordie Yose~~	Rhientsanie Meila
Anindyo Baskoro & Vidi Aldiano	Yohannes Williem	~~Nada & Nida~~	~~Dimas Ximenes~~	~~Trully Patty~~	Antonio Manurung	Apricilia Amrullah
Anindyo Baskoro & Vidi Aldiano	Danu Resowikoro	Devta Pramesthi	Gizka Aulia	Imanuela Galuanta	Jean Harefa	Jeremy Sianipar
Anindyo Baskoro & Vidi Aldiano	Licya Cendrasyca	Mutiara Azka	Samuel Gabriel	—	—	—
Isyana Sarasvati						
Isyana Sarasvati	Nikita Becker	Kaleb Jonathaniel	Joy Fernando	Thomas Vincent	Agisnia Azizah	Agnes Cevira
Isyana Sarasvati	Dimas Ximenes	Namira Adjani	~~Vionita Veronika~~	Adlani Rambe	Aloysia Susila	Armand Butarbutar
Isyana Sarasvati	Dimas Titis	Dnanda Anugerah	Hana Adityana	Jacqoeline Toruan	Lydia Pasaribu	Maretha Primadani
Isyana Sarasvati	Maria Christin	Ramona Bina	Saly Yanuar	Yudhi Mindria	—	—
Gamaliel Tapiheru						
Gamaliel Tapiheru	~~Jordie Yose~~	Muhammad Rifqi	Nada & Nida	Echa Adelina	Florence Agatha	Maria Claudya
Gamaliel Tapiheru	Nidia Silalahi	—	—	—	—	—
Note: Italicized names are stolen contestants (names struck through within former teams). Bolded name is the artist who won The Comeback Stage and joined another team of their choosing (name struck through within former team).

Note
a. Nadia Dharmawan initially auditioned together with Yoseph Hermanto, but coach Titi DJ, who turned, prefer to have only Nadia advancing to the next round due to being interested in only one voice, which is Nadia's. They then agreed that only Nadia will advance.
b. Hizkia Gultom and Natasya Nabila paired for the battle, but Vidi & Nino can't decide to choose one, so they both then advanced to the Live Shows as a pair.

== Blind Auditions ==
Based on the U.S. version, the Block was featured within the Blind Auditions this season, which each coach can use once to prevent one of the other coaches from getting a contestant.

Color key

✔	Coach pressed "I WANT YOU" button
	Artist defaulted to a coach's team
	Artist elected a coach's team
	Artist received a "Four-Chair Turn"
	Artist was eliminated and was not invited back for "The Comeback Stage"
	Artist was eliminated, but got a second chance to compete in "The Comeback Stage"
✘	Coach pressed the "I WANT YOU" button, but was blocked by Armand from getting the artist
✘	Coach pressed the "I WANT YOU" button, but was blocked by Titi from getting the artist
✘	Coach pressed the "I WANT YOU" button, but was blocked by Vidi & Nino from getting the artist
✘	Coach pressed the "I WANT YOU" button, but was blocked by Isyana from getting the artist

=== Episode 1 (August 29) ===
Order	Artist	Age	Hometown	Song	Coach's and artist's choices			
Order	Artist	Age	Hometown	Song	Armand	Titi	Vidi & Nino	Isyana
1	Belinda Khaerana	21	Bogor	"Masa Lalu"	✔	✔	✔	✔
2	Lydia Pasaribu	20	Bekasi	"Easy"	✔	–	✘	✔
3	Elly Chia	20	Batam	"What's Up?"	✔	✔	–	–
4	Ferlita Ningtyas	19	Lampung	"Sorai"	✔	✔	✔	✔
5	Danu Resowikoro	31	Surabaya	"Begitu Indah"	–	–	✔	–
6	Genya Kurnain	23	Bandung	"Perbedaan"	–	✔	–	–
7	Asyefi Muhammad	24	Bekasi	"Don't Stop Me Now"	–	–	–	–
8	Nikita Becker	16	Bekasi	"Anganku Anganmu"	✔	✔	✔	✔
9	Agnes Cevira	22	Malang	"Mimpi"	✔	–	✔	✔
10	Bagus Agung	18	Denpasar	"Yellow"	✔	✔	✔	–
11	Elma Christy	24	Surabaya	"Jatuh Hati"	–	–	–	–
12	Gery & Gany	19	Atambua	"Can't Stop the Feeling!"	✔	–	✔	✔

=== Episode 2 (August 30) ===
Order	Artist	Age	Hometown	Song	Coach's and artist's choices			
Order	Artist	Age	Hometown	Song	Armand	Titi	Vidi & Nino	Isyana
1	Dimas Ximenes	21	Maumere	"My Everything"	–	✔	✔	✔
2	Meidiana Putri	20	Ciamis	"Without Me"	✔	✔	–	✔
3	Razita Puti	19	Padang	"Siapkah Kau Tuk Jatuh Cinta Lagi"	–	✔	–	–
4	Vien Audrey	21	Jambi	"Somewhere Over the Rainbow"	✔	✔	✔	✔
5	Vicky Rian	19	Bandung	"Ragu"	–	–	–	–
6	Joy Fernando	19	Mataram	"6, 8, 12"	✔	✔	✔	✔
7	Jeremy Sianipar	20	Jakarta	"Lagu Kita"	–	–	✔	–
8	Ersya Purnama	21	Banjarmasin	"Soulmate"	–	✔	✔	–
9	Maria Claudya	19	Atambua	"Come Together"	–	–	–	–
10	Aloysia Susila	18	Maumere	"Laksmana Raja di Laut"	✔	✔	–	✔
11	Nadia Agatha	16	Tasikmalaya	"Man Down"	✔	✔	–	✔
12	Dhani Ramadhan	20	Ternate	"Akhir Cerita Cinta"	✔	–	✔	✔

=== Episode 3 (September 5) ===
Order	Artist	Age	Hometown	Song	Coach's and artist's choices			
Order	Artist	Age	Hometown	Song	Armand	Titi	Vidi & Nino	Isyana
1	Kaleb Jonathaniel	18	Jakarta	"Heaven"	✔	✔	✘	✔
2	Ramona Bina	23	Gorontalo	"Pernah Muda"	–	–	–	✔
3	Muhammad Rifqi	17	Jakarta	"High Hopes"	–	–	–	–
4	Patricia Celine	16	Malang	"7 Rings"	✔	✔	✔	✔
5	Elisabeth Devina	23	Maumere	"One Kiss"	–	✔	–	–
6	Gizka Aulia	18	Jakarta	"Love You Like a Love Song"	–	–	✔	✔
7	Imam Hidayat	27	Lombok	"Saat Kau Jauh"	–	–	–	–
8	Adlani Rambe	21	Medan	"Jadi Aku Sebentar Saja"	–	✔	–	✔
9	Chrissamary Husono	22	Surabaya	"Senandung Maaf"	✔	–	–	–
10	Kania Zepty	22	Jombang	"The House of the Rising Sun"	✔	✔	–	–
11	Sharen Laurel	16	Makassar	"Ratu Sejagad"	–	–	–	–
12	Eunike Freskilia	27	Solo	"Who You Are"	–	✔	–	–

=== Episode 4 (September 6) ===
Armand Maulana's daughter Naja Dewi auditioned as a surprise in this episode with the song "Gravity" and made all chairs turned. She "chose" Isyana.

Order	Artist	Age	Hometown	Song	Coach's and artist's choices			
Order	Artist	Age	Hometown	Song	Armand	Titi	Vidi & Nino	Isyana
1	Rhientsanie Meila	16	Bandung	"Nirmala"	✔	✔	✔	✘
2	Glorivay Assa	16	Manado	"Ashes"	–	✔	✔	–
3	Agisnia Azizah	20	Madiun	"Apalah (Arti Menunggu)"	✔	–	✔	✔
4	Elsha Graciela	19	Jakarta	"Just a Girl"	✔	–	✔	–
5	Fahmi Muliazir	27	Sabang	"Semua Tentang Kita"	–	–	–	–
6	Rafi Hamzah	20	Yogyakarta	"With You"	–	✔	✔	–
7	Mutiara Azka	22	Jakarta	"I Want You Back"	✔	–	✔	✔
8	Elsyara Dwi	17	Medan	"Berpisah"	–	–	–	–
9	Yudi Mindria	26	Lombok	"Sebelah Mata"	✔	–	–	✔
10	Nadia^{a} & Yoseph	18^{a} & 32	Semarang	"I Was Made for Loving You"	–	✔	–	–
11	Ical Jenggo	29	Jakarta	"Perhaps, Perhaps, Perhaps"	✔	–	–	–

Note
a. Nadia Dharmawan initially auditioned together with Yoseph Hermanto, but coach Titi DJ, who turned, prefer to have only Nadia advancing to the next round due to being interested in only one voice, which is Nadia's. They then agreed that only Nadia will advance.

=== Episode 5 (September 12) ===
Order	Artist	Age	Hometown	Song	Coach's and artist's choices			
Order	Artist	Age	Hometown	Song	Armand	Titi	Vidi & Nino	Isyana
1	Devta Pramesthi	21	Serang	"Lagi Syantik"	✔	–	✔	✔
2	Namira Adjani	19	Jakarta	"Intuisi"	✔	–	–	✔
3	Shaly Syina	24	Bandung	"Ilalang"	–	✔	–	–
4	Alvin Wardiman	18	Surabaya	"Sunday Morning"	✔	–	–	–
5	Hirbertus Putra	22	Ende	"Haven't Met You Yet"	–	–	–	–
6	Yakobus Ndopo	22	Ende	"Night Changes"	✔	✔	–	–
7	Echa Adelina	22	Ende	"Skinny Love"	–	–	–	–
8	Tesalonika Manalu	16	Tarutung	"Speechless"	✔	✔	✔	✔
9	Sintha Inara	18	Palangkaraya	"Dia"	✔	–	✔	✔
10	Dimas Titis	29	Semarang	"Ordinary People"	✔	–	–	✔
11	Apricilia Amrullah	21	Makassar	"Satu Yang Tak Bisa Lepas"	–	–	✔	–
12	Sakthi Moi	18	Medan	"Lily"	–	✔	–	–

=== Episode 6 (September 13) ===
Order	Artist	Age	Hometown	Song	Coach's and artist's choices			
Order	Artist	Age	Hometown	Song	Armand	Titi	Vidi & Nino	Isyana
1	Aura Shofia	20	Tangerang	"Sedang Ingin Bercinta"	✔	–	✔	–
2	Natasya Nabila	19	Jakarta	"Love"	✔	✔	✔	✔
3	Samuel Gabriel	16	Depok	"Berdua Bersama"	–	–	✔	–
4	Malida Nielsen	18	Medan	"Riptide"	✔	–	–	–
5	Dimas Tabah	27	Bekasi	"Crazy"	–	–	–	–
6	Vionita Veronika	21	Medan	"Prahara Cinta"	✔	–	✔	✔
7	Fenny Vhebian	31	Surabaya	"Saving All My Love for You"	–	–	–	–
8	David Febrian	26	Pekanbaru	"Said I Loved You...But I Lied"	✔	✔	✘	✔
9	Hana Adityana	27	Solo	"Keabadian"	–	–	–	✔
10	Herald Claren	17	Madiun	"Lost Boy"	✔	✔	–	–
11	Maria Ines	32	Kupang	"Sayang"	–	–	–	–
12	Nickholas Siregar	30	Pematang Siantar	"Wherever You Will Go"	–	✔	–	–

=== Episode 7 (September 19) ===
Order	Artist	Age	Hometown	Song	Coach's and artist's choices			
Order	Artist	Age	Hometown	Song	Armand	Titi	Vidi & Nino	Isyana
1	Nada & Nida	18	Bekasi	"Tolong"	✔	–	✔	–
2	Armand Butarbutar	27	Jakarta	"Merindukanmu"	–	–	–	✔
3	Suci Yantini	27	Denpasar	"Give Me One Reason"	✔	✔	✔	✔
4	Jordie Yose	24	Jakarta	"Shotgun"	✔	✔	✔	✔
5	Anindita Maharani	26	Semarang	"Aku Wanita"	–	–	–	–
6	Wijaya Kusuma	27	Surabaya	"Cintaku Kandas"	–	✔	–	–
7	Trianetha Henuk	17	Kupang	"Starving"	✔	–	✔	–
8	Annisa Lubis	22	Medan	"I Knew You Were Trouble"	–	✔	–	–
9	Gede Rio	25	Bali	"Andai"	–	–	–	–
10	Maretha Primadani	18	Lamongan	"Wulan Merindu"	–	–	✔	✔
11	Firdha Rachmadhani	22	Bandung	"Back to Black"	✔	–	–	–
12	Florence Agatha	16	East Tangerang	"Lips Are Movin'"	–	–	–	–

=== Episode 8 (September 20) ===
Order	Artist	Age	Hometown	Song	Coach's and artist's choices			
Order	Artist	Age	Hometown	Song	Armand	Titi	Vidi & Nino	Isyana
1	Antonio Manurung	18	Medan	"Cukup Siti Nurbaya"	–	–	✔	✔
2	Givania Angelica	19	Karawang	"Overjoyed"	–	✔	–	✔
3	Truly Patty	16	Jakarta	"Fallin'"	–	–	✔	–
4	Thomas Vincent	30	Maumere	"Tak Pernah Setengah Hati"	✔	✔	✔	✔
5	Nidia Silalahi	22	Tangerang	"Mata ke Hati"	–	–	–	–
6	Saly Yuniar	29	Surabaya	"Defying Gravity"	✔	✔	✔	✔
7	Yuliana Maya	32	Maumere	"Sesuatu"	–	–	–	–
8	Licya Cendrasyca	24	Jakarta	"Ni Shuo Ni Bu Gan Ai Wo"	–	–	✔	–
9	Wida Widia	23	Cianjur	"Egois"	–	–	–	–
10	Nura Irina	20	Tembagapura	"One and Only"	✔	✔	✔	–
11	Dnanda Anugerah	20	Riau	"Kucinta Kau Apa Adanya"	–	–	–	✔
12	Julian Melchior	21	Manado	"Back at One"	✔	–	–	–

=== Episode 9 (September 26) ===
Order	Artist	Age	Hometown	Song	Coach's and artist's choices			
Order	Artist	Age	Hometown	Song	Armand	Titi	Vidi & Nino	Isyana
1	Sisca & Jun	28 & 28	Jakarta	"Shallow"	✔	–	✔	✔
2	Hizkia Gultom	25	Medan	"Cemburu Menguras Hati"	–	–	✔	–
3	Jean Harefa	22	Medan	"Firasat"	✔	✔	✔	✔
4	Ari Anggara	25	Kutai Kartanegara	"Fatwa Pujangga"	✔	✔	–	–
5	Yohannes Williem	30	Tangerang	"Making Love Out of Nothing at All"	✔	✔	✔	✔
6	Widya Angela	20	Banjarmasin	"Semenjak Ada Dirimu"	Team full	✔	✔	✔
7	Ningsyh Grasyella	23	Aru Islands	" A Natural Woman"	Team full	Team full	–	–
8	Maria Christin	18	Bogor	"Flashlight"	Team full	Team full	–	✔
9	Audina Sabathini	23	Jakarta	"Breathin"	Team full	Team full	–	–
10	Imanuela Galuanta	19	Gorontalo	"No One"	Team full	Team full	✔	–
11	Akbar Esa	24	Lampung	"Cinta"	Team full	Team full	Team full	–
12	Jacqoeline Toruan	20	Medan	"Con Te Partiro"	Team full	Team full	Team full	✔

== The Knockouts ==
The Knockouts start from Friday, September 27, 2019. At this stage, the coaches can steal one losing artist from another coach.

Color key:

Artist won the Knockout and advanced to the Battles
Artist lost the Knockout but was stolen by another coach and advanced to the Battles
Artist lost the Knockout but was stolen by "Audience Steal" and got a second chance to compete in "The Comeback Stage"
Artist lost the Knockout and was eliminated

Episode	Coach	Order	Artist	Song	Result
Episode 10 (Friday, September 27, 2019)	Vidi & Nino	1	Antonio Manurung	"I Don't Want To Miss A Thing"	Eliminated
Episode 10 (Friday, September 27, 2019)	Vidi & Nino	2	Dimas Ximenes	"Kala Cinta Menggoda"	Isyana's Save
Episode 10 (Friday, September 27, 2019)	Vidi & Nino	3	Belinda Khaerana	"Laguku"	Advanced
Episode 10 (Friday, September 27, 2019)	Titi DJ	4	Givania Angelica	"Pupus"	Eliminated
Episode 10 (Friday, September 27, 2019)	Titi DJ	5	Rafi Hamzah	"Can We Talk"	Advanced
Episode 10 (Friday, September 27, 2019)	Titi DJ	6	Ersya Purnama	"Cintaku"	Eliminated
Episode 10 (Friday, September 27, 2019)	Isyana Sarasvati	7	Saly Yanuar	"A Million Dreams"	Eliminated
Episode 10 (Friday, September 27, 2019)	Isyana Sarasvati	8	Hana Adityana	"Bukan Cinta Biasa"	Eliminated
Episode 10 (Friday, September 27, 2019)	Isyana Sarasvati	9	Joy Fernando	"Versace on the Floor"	Advanced
Episode 10 (Friday, September 27, 2019)	Armand Maulana	10	Yakobus Ndopo	"Naked"	Advanced
Episode 10 (Friday, September 27, 2019)	Armand Maulana	11	Julian Melchior	"Lemonade"	Eliminated
Episode 10 (Friday, September 27, 2019)	Armand Maulana	12	Nadia Agatha	"Kuingin Kau Mati Saja"	Eliminated
Episode 10 (Friday, September 27, 2019)	Vidi & Nino	13	Danu Resowikoro	"Dibawah Sinar Bulan Purnama"	Eliminated
Episode 10 (Friday, September 27, 2019)	Vidi & Nino	14	Jeremy Sianipar	"Dia Dia Dia"	Eliminated
Episode 10 (Friday, September 27, 2019)	Vidi & Nino	15	Gery & Gany	"I'll Make Love to You/End of the Road"	Advanced
Episode 10 (Friday, September 27, 2019)	Isyana Sarasvati	16	Lydia Pasaribu	"Suit & Tie"	Eliminated
Episode 10 (Friday, September 27, 2019)	Isyana Sarasvati	17	Ramona Buna	"Hampa"	Eliminated
Episode 10 (Friday, September 27, 2019)	Isyana Sarasvati	18	Namira Adjani	"Dream a Little Dream of Me"	Advanced
Episode 11 (Thursday, October 3, 2019)	Armand Maulana	1	Ical Jenggo	"Nonton Bioskop"	Eliminated
Episode 11 (Thursday, October 3, 2019)	Armand Maulana	2	Nura Irina	"Love on the Brain"	Eliminated
Episode 11 (Thursday, October 3, 2019)	Armand Maulana	3	Suci Yantini	"Menghujam Jantungku"	Advanced
Episode 11 (Thursday, October 3, 2019)	Titi DJ	4	Genya Kurnain	"Ya Maulana"	Advanced
Episode 11 (Thursday, October 3, 2019)	Titi DJ	5	Ari Anggara	"Nurjanah"	Eliminated
Episode 11 (Thursday, October 3, 2019)	Titi DJ	6	Elisabeth Devina	"Kali Kedua"	Eliminated
Episode 11 (Thursday, October 3, 2019)	Isyana Sarasvati	7	Vionita Veronika	"Milikmu Selalu"	Titi's Save
Episode 11 (Thursday, October 3, 2019)	Isyana Sarasvati	8	Jacqoeline Toruan	"Angel"	Eliminated
Episode 11 (Thursday, October 3, 2019)	Isyana Sarasvati	9	Nikita Becker	"And I Am Telling You I'm Not Going"	Advanced
Episode 11 (Thursday, October 3, 2019)	Armand Maulana	10	Vien Audrey	"Can You Feel the Love Tonight?"	Eliminated
Episode 11 (Thursday, October 3, 2019)	Armand Maulana	11	Chissamary Husono	"Can't Help Falling in Love"	Advanced
Episode 11 (Thursday, October 3, 2019)	Armand Maulana	12	Alvin Wardiman	"Cinta Ini Membunuhku"	Eliminated
Episode 11 (Thursday, October 3, 2019)	Vidi & Nino	13	Licya Cendrasyca	"Solo"	Eliminated
Episode 11 (Thursday, October 3, 2019)	Vidi & Nino	14	Jordie Yose	"Falling Like the Stars"	Advanced
Episode 11 (Thursday, October 3, 2019)	Vidi & Nino	15	Imanuela Galuanta	"Berharap Tak Berpisah"	Eliminated
Episode 11 (Thursday, October 3, 2019)	Titi DJ	16	Widya Angela	"The Only Exception"	Advanced
Episode 11 (Thursday, October 3, 2019)	Titi DJ	17	Meidiana Putri	"The Middle"	Eliminated
Episode 11 (Thursday, October 3, 2019)	Titi DJ	18	Annisa Lubis	"Rindu Ini"	Eliminated
Episode 12 (Friday, October 4, 2019)	Armand Maulana	1	Aura Shofia	"Uang"	Eliminated
Episode 12 (Friday, October 4, 2019)	Armand Maulana	2	Elly Chia	"I Remember You"	Advanced
Episode 12 (Friday, October 4, 2019)	Armand Maulana	3	Sisca & Jun	"Best Part"	Eliminated
Episode 12 (Friday, October 4, 2019)	Vidi & Nino	4	Nada & Nida	"Jikalau"	Audience Steal
Episode 12 (Friday, October 4, 2019)	Vidi & Nino	5	Hizkia Gultom	"Sahabat Jadi Cinta"	Advanced
Episode 12 (Friday, October 4, 2019)	Vidi & Nino	6	Devta Pramesthi	"Lowkey"	Eliminated
Episode 12 (Friday, October 4, 2019)	Isyana Sarasvati	7	Agisnia Azizah	"Banyu Langit"	Advanced
Episode 12 (Friday, October 4, 2019)	Isyana Sarasvati	8	Aloysia Susila	"Laila Canggung"	Eliminated
Episode 12 (Friday, October 4, 2019)	Isyana Sarasvati	9	Yudhi Mindria	"Better Man"	Eliminated
Episode 12 (Friday, October 4, 2019)	Titi DJ	10	Razita Puti	"Aku Bukan Untukmu"	Eliminated
Episode 12 (Friday, October 4, 2019)	Titi DJ	11	Glorivay Assa	"Bukan Cinta Biasa"	Advanced
Episode 12 (Friday, October 4, 2019)	Titi DJ	12	Kania Zepty	"Dangerous Woman"	Eliminated
Episode 12 (Friday, October 4, 2019)	Vidi & Nino	13	Jean Harefa	"Over and Over Again"	Eliminated
Episode 12 (Friday, October 4, 2019)	Vidi & Nino	14	Natasya Nabila	"How Deep Is Your Love"	Advanced
Episode 12 (Friday, October 4, 2019)	Vidi & Nino	15	Mutiara Azka	"I Wanna Dance With Somebody"	Eliminated
Episode 13 (Thursday, October 10, 2019)	Isyana Sarasvati	1	Thomas Vincent	"Kini"	Advanced
Episode 13 (Thursday, October 10, 2019)	Isyana Sarasvati	2	Adlani Rambe	"Salahkah Bila Terlalu Mencintaimu"	Eliminated
Episode 13 (Thursday, October 10, 2019)	Isyana Sarasvati	3	Armand Butarbutar	"Akhir Kisah Ini"	Eliminated
Episode 13 (Thursday, October 10, 2019)	Vidi & Nino	4	Rhientsanie Meila	"Kejora"	Advanced
Episode 13 (Thursday, October 10, 2019)	Vidi & Nino	5	Apricilia Amrullah	"Remember Me This Way"	Eliminated
Episode 13 (Thursday, October 10, 2019)	Vidi & Nino	6	Gizka Aulia	"Memulai Kembali"	Eliminated
Episode 13 (Thursday, October 10, 2019)	Armand Maulana	7	Yohannes Williem	"Don't Stop Believin'"	Vidi & Nino's Save
Episode 13 (Thursday, October 10, 2019)	Armand Maulana	8	Dhani Ramadhan	"Dibalas Dengan Dusta"	Eliminated
Episode 13 (Thursday, October 10, 2019)	Armand Maulana	9	Bagus Agung	"Killing Me Softly With Her Song"	Advanced
Episode 13 (Thursday, October 10, 2019)	Isyana Sarasvati	10	Dimas Titis	"Perfect"	Eliminated
Episode 13 (Thursday, October 10, 2019)	Isyana Sarasvati	11	Kaleb Jonathaniel	"One Last Cry"	Advanced
Episode 13 (Thursday, October 10, 2019)	Isyana Sarasvati	12	Maria Christin	"Akad"	Eliminated
Episode 13 (Thursday, October 10, 2019)	Titi DJ	13	Nadhia Dharmawan	"Reflection"	Eliminated
Episode 13 (Thursday, October 10, 2019)	Titi DJ	14	Ferlita Ningtyas	"Imagine"	Advanced
Episode 13 (Thursday, October 10, 2019)	Titi DJ	15	Herald Claren	"idontwannabeyouanymore"	Eliminated
Episode 13 (Thursday, October 10, 2019)	Armand Maulana	16	Trianetha Henuk	"Matamu"	Advanced
Episode 13 (Thursday, October 10, 2019)	Armand Maulana	17	Malida Nielsen	"Ride"	Eliminated
Episode 13 (Thursday, October 10, 2019)	Armand Maulana	18	Firdha Rachmadhani	"Sorry Not Sorry"	Eliminated
Episode 14 (Friday, October 11, 2019)	Titi DJ	1	Shaly Syina	"Jera"	Eliminated
Episode 14 (Friday, October 11, 2019)	Titi DJ	2	Sakhti Moi	"The Show"	Advanced
Episode 14 (Friday, October 11, 2019)	Titi DJ	3	Eunike Freskilia	"Makhluk Tuhan Yang Paling Sexy"	Eliminated
Episode 14 (Friday, October 11, 2019)	Vidi & Nino	4	Truly Patty	"Halo"	Armand's Save
Episode 14 (Friday, October 11, 2019)	Vidi & Nino	5	Tesalonika Manalu	"Cinta Sejati"	Advanced
Episode 14 (Friday, October 11, 2019)	Vidi & Nino	6	Samuel Gabriel	"Kau"	Eliminated
Episode 14 (Friday, October 11, 2019)	Armand Maulana	7	Elsha Graciela	"Mercy"	Advanced
Episode 14 (Friday, October 11, 2019)	Armand Maulana	8	Patricia Celine	"Bilang Saja"	Eliminated
Episode 14 (Friday, October 11, 2019)	Armand Maulana	9	Shinta Inara	"Pergi Untuk Kembali"	Eliminated
Episode 14 (Friday, October 11, 2019)	Titi DJ	10	Wijaya Kusuma	"Menghitung Hari 2"	Advanced
Episode 14 (Friday, October 11, 2019)	Titi DJ	11	David Febrian	"Bukan Rayuan Gombal"	Eliminated
Episode 14 (Friday, October 11, 2019)	Titi DJ	12	Nickholas Siregar	"Always Be My Baby"	Eliminated
Episode 14 (Friday, October 11, 2019)	Isyana Sarasvati	13	Maretha Primadani	"Seroja"	Eliminated
Episode 14 (Friday, October 11, 2019)	Isyana Sarasvati	14	Agnes Cevira	"Symphony Yang Indah"	Advanced
Episode 14 (Friday, October 11, 2019)	Isyana Sarasvati	15	Dnanda Anugerah	"Cemburu"	Eliminated

== The Battles ==
The Battles aired from Thursday, October 17, 2019. The Top 16 then moved to the Live Shows

Color key:

Artist won the Battle and advanced to the Live Shows
Artist lost the Battle but was stolen by "Audience Steal" and got a second chance to compete in "The Comeback Stage"
Artist lost the Battle and was eliminated

Episode	Coach	Order	Winner	Song	Loser
Episode 15 (Thursday, October 17, 2019)	Titi DJ	1	Genya Kurnain	"Aku dan Dirimu"	Glorivay Assa
Episode 15 (Thursday, October 17, 2019)	Titi DJ	2	Vionita Veronika	"Hanya Cinta yang Bisa"	Widya Angela
Episode 15 (Thursday, October 17, 2019)	Titi DJ	3	Wijaya Kusuma	"Señorita"	Sakhti Moi
Episode 15 (Thursday, October 17, 2019)	Titi DJ	4	Ferlita Ningtyas	"Cinta Mati"	Rafi Hamzah
Episode 15 (Thursday, October 17, 2019)	Isyana Sarasvati	5	Joy Fernando	"Treasure"	Dimas Ximenes
Episode 15 (Thursday, October 17, 2019)	Isyana Sarasvati	6	Nikita Becker	"When You Believe"	Agnes Cevira
Episode 15 (Thursday, October 17, 2019)	Isyana Sarasvati	7	Thomas Vincent	"Buktikan"	Agisnia Azizah
Episode 15 (Thursday, October 17, 2019)	Isyana Sarasvati	8	Kaleb Jonathaniel	"Brokenhearted"	Namira Adjani
Episode 16 (Friday, October 18, 2019)	Armand Maulana	1	Elly Chia	"Wonderwall"	Elsha Graciela
Episode 16 (Friday, October 18, 2019)	Armand Maulana	2	Trianetha Henuk	"Benci Untuk Mencinta"	Yakobus Ndopo
Episode 16 (Friday, October 18, 2019)	Armand Maulana	3	Bagus Agung	"Risalah Hati"	Chissamary Husono
Episode 16 (Friday, October 18, 2019)	Armand Maulana	4	Suci Yantini	"I Will Always Love You"	Truly Patty
Episode 16 (Friday, October 18, 2019)	Vidi & Nino	5	Gery & Gany	"Nurlela"	Yohannes Williem
Episode 16 (Friday, October 18, 2019)	Vidi & Nino	6	Tesalonika Manalu	"Amin Paling Serius"	Jordie Yose
Episode 16 (Friday, October 18, 2019)	Vidi & Nino	7	Belinda Khaerana	"Cindai"	Rhientsanie Meila
Episode 16 (Friday, October 18, 2019)	Vidi & Nino	8	Hizkia Gultom*	"So Amazing"	Natasya Nabila*

- Hizkia Gultom and Natasya Nabila paired for the battle, but Vidi & Nino can't decide to choose one, so they both then advanced to the Live Shows as a pair

== The Comeback Stage ==
For this season, the show added a brand new phase of competition called The Comeback Stage that was exclusive to Ruangguru. It was shown for the first time in the fifteenth season of the American version. After failing to turn a chair in the blind auditions or eliminated from knockout and battles.

=== Sing Off ===
Artist won the Sing Off and advanced to the Battle
Artist lost the Sing Off and was eliminated

Episode (Digital)	Coach	Artist	Song	Result
Episode 1 (Thursday, October 3, 2019)	Gamaliel Tapiheru	Maria Claudya	"Mata Lelaki"	Eliminated
Episode 2 (Friday, October 4, 2019)	Gamaliel Tapiheru	Florence Agatha	"Lovely"	Eliminated
Episode 3 (Saturday, October 5, 2019)	Gamaliel Tapiheru	Muhammad Rifqi	"When I Was Your Man"	Advanced
Episode 4 (Thursday, October 10, 2019)	Gamaliel Tapiheru	Nidia Silalahi	"Harus Bahagia"	Eliminated
Episode 5 (Friday, October 11, 2019)	Gamaliel Tapiheru	Echa Adelina	"Takkan Pernah Ada"	Eliminated

=== The Battles ===
==== Round 1 ====
Artist won the Battle, Round 1 and advanced to the Battle, Round 2
Artist lost the Battle, Round 1 and was eliminated

Episode (Digital)	Coach	Song	Artists		Song
Episode (Digital)	Coach	Song	Winner	Loser	Song
Episode 6 (Thursday, October 17, 2019)	Gamaliel Tapiheru	"Lay Me Down"	Muhammad Rifqi	Nada & Nida	"I Love You 3000"

==== Round 2 ====
Artist won the Comeback Stage and advanced to the Live Shows
Artist lost the Comeback Stage and was eliminated

Episode (Digital)	Coach	Song	Artists		Song
Episode (Digital)	Coach	Song	Winner	Loser	Song
Episode 7 (Saturday, October 19, 2019)	Gamaliel Tapiheru	"Someone You Loved"	Jordie Yose	Muhammad Rifqi	"Jikalau Kau Cinta"

== Live Shows ==
Color key:

Artist was saved by the Public's votes
Artist was saved by his/her coach
Artist was eliminated

=== Week 1: Top 17 (October 24) ===
Jordie Yose, the winner of the Comeback Stage had the choice to join any of the four coaches teams, and he decided to join Team Armand.

Episode	Coach	Order	Artist	Song	Result
Episode 17 (Thursday, October 24, 2019)	Titi DJ	1	Wijaya Kusuma	"Salah Apa Aku"	Eliminated
Episode 17 (Thursday, October 24, 2019)	Titi DJ	2	Vionita Veronika	"My All"	Public's vote
Episode 17 (Thursday, October 24, 2019)	Titi DJ	3	Genya Kurnain	"Hanya Rindu"	Public's vote
Episode 17 (Thursday, October 24, 2019)	Titi DJ	4	Ferlita Ningtyas	"Diamonds"	Titi's choice
Episode 17 (Thursday, October 24, 2019)	Vidi & Nino	5	Belinda Khaerana	"Candu Asmara"	Public's vote
Episode 17 (Thursday, October 24, 2019)	Vidi & Nino	6	Gery & Gany	"Rame-Rame"	Eliminated
Episode 17 (Thursday, October 24, 2019)	Vidi & Nino	7	Tesalonika Manalu	"Rise Up"	Public's vote
Episode 17 (Thursday, October 24, 2019)	Vidi & Nino	8	Natasya & Hizkia	"One Sweet Day"	Vidi & Nino's choice
Episode 17 (Thursday, October 24, 2019)	Armand Maulana	9	Suci Yantini	"Makin Aku Cinta"	Armand's choice
Episode 17 (Thursday, October 24, 2019)	Armand Maulana	10	Jordie Yose	"Tak Pernah Padam"	Eliminated
Episode 17 (Thursday, October 24, 2019)	Armand Maulana	11	Bagus Agung	"Mantan Terindah"	Public's vote
Episode 17 (Thursday, October 24, 2019)	Armand Maulana	12	Elly Chia	"Sweet Child o' Mine"	Public's vote
Episode 17 (Thursday, October 24, 2019)	Armand Maulana	13	Trianetha Henuk	"Royals"	Eliminated
Episode 17 (Thursday, October 24, 2019)	Isyana Sarasvati	14	Joy Fernando	"Salam Bagi Sahabat"	Public's vote
Episode 17 (Thursday, October 24, 2019)	Isyana Sarasvati	15	Kaleb Jonathaniel	"Just Friends (Sunny)"	Isyana's choice
Episode 17 (Thursday, October 24, 2019)	Isyana Sarasvati	16	Nikita Becker	"New York, New York"	Public's vote
Episode 17 (Thursday, October 24, 2019)	Isyana Sarasvati	17	Thomas Vincent	"Kisah Romantis"	Eliminated

=== Week 2: Top 12 (October 31) ===
Episode	Coach	Order	Artist	Song	Result
Episode 18 (Thursday, October 31, 2019)	Armand Maulana	1	Elly Chia	"Melompat Lebih Tinggi"	Public's vote
Episode 18 (Thursday, October 31, 2019)	Armand Maulana	2	Bagus Agung	"Dan"	Armand's choice
Episode 18 (Thursday, October 31, 2019)	Armand Maulana	3	Suci Yantini	"Rahasia Hati"	Eliminated
Episode 18 (Thursday, October 31, 2019)	Vidi & Nino	4	Natasya & Hizkia	"Biar Menjadi Kenangan"	Vidi & Nino's choice
Episode 18 (Thursday, October 31, 2019)	Vidi & Nino	5	Belinda Khaerana	"Pelangi Di Matamu"	Eliminated
Episode 18 (Thursday, October 31, 2019)	Vidi & Nino	6	Tesalonika Manalu	"Stone Cold"	Public's vote
Episode 18 (Thursday, October 31, 2019)	Isyana Sarasvati	7	Nikita Becker	"Suara Hati Seorang Kasih"	Isyana's choice
Episode 18 (Thursday, October 31, 2019)	Isyana Sarasvati	8	Joy Fernando	"You Are Not Alone"	Eliminated
Episode 18 (Thursday, October 31, 2019)	Isyana Sarasvati	9	Kaleb Jonathaniel	"So Sick"	Public's vote
Episode 18 (Thursday, October 31, 2019)	Titi DJ	10	Genya Kurnain	"Sakura/Desert Rose"	Titi's choice
Episode 18 (Thursday, October 31, 2019)	Titi DJ	11	Ferlita Ningtyas	"Aku Cuma Punya Hati"	Eliminated
Episode 18 (Thursday, October 31, 2019)	Titi DJ	12	Vionita Veronika	"Harus Bahagia"	Public's vote

=== Week 3: Top 8 (November 7) ===
Episode	Coach	Order	Artist	Song	Result
Episode 19 (Thursday, November 7, 2019)	Armand Maulana	1	Bagus Agung	"Anak Jalanan"	Public's vote
Episode 19 (Thursday, November 7, 2019)	Armand Maulana	2	Elly Chia	"Iris"	Public's vote
Episode 19 (Thursday, November 7, 2019)	Titi DJ	3	Genya Kurnain	"Dealova"	Eliminated
Episode 19 (Thursday, November 7, 2019)	Titi DJ	4	Vionita Veronika	"Malaikat Juga Tahu"	Public's vote
Episode 19 (Thursday, November 7, 2019)	Isyana Sarasvati	5	Nikita Becker	"Sekali Lagi"	Public's vote
Episode 19 (Thursday, November 7, 2019)	Isyana Sarasvati	6	Kaleb Jonathaniel	"I Still Love You"	Public's vote
Episode 19 (Thursday, November 7, 2019)	Vidi & Nino	7	Natasya & Hizkia	"I Believe I Can Fly"	Public's vote
Episode 19 (Thursday, November 7, 2019)	Vidi & Nino	8	Tesalonika Manalu	"I'll Never Love Again"	Public's vote

=== Week 4: Top 7 (November 14) ===
Episode	Coach	Order	Artist	Song	Result
Episode 20 (Thursday, November 14, 2019)	Isyana Sarasvati	1	Kaleb Jonathaniel	"Galih & Ratna"	Public's vote
Episode 20 (Thursday, November 14, 2019)	Isyana Sarasvati	2	Nikita Becker	"I Have Nothing"	Public's vote
Episode 20 (Thursday, November 14, 2019)	Vidi & Nino	3	Tesalonika Manalu	"Andaikan Kau Datang"	Public's vote
Episode 20 (Thursday, November 14, 2019)	Vidi & Nino	4	Natasya & Hizkia	"September"	Eliminated
Episode 20 (Thursday, November 14, 2019)	Armand Maulana	5	Elly Chia	"Smells Like Teen Spirit"	Public's vote
Episode 20 (Thursday, November 14, 2019)	Armand Maulana	6	Bagus Agung	"No Woman No Cry"	Public's vote
Episode 20 (Thursday, November 14, 2019)	Titi DJ	7	Vionita Veronika	"Ijinkan Aku Menyayangimu"	Public's vote

=== Week 5: Semifinals, Top 6 (November 21) ===
Guest performance by Iis Dahlia ("Hello Dangdut")

Episode	Coach	Order	Artist	Song	Result
Episode 21 (Thursday, November 21, 2019)	Isyana Sarasvati	1	Nikita Becker	"Bento"	Public's vote
Episode 21 (Thursday, November 21, 2019)	Isyana Sarasvati	2	Kaleb Jonathaniel	"Adu Rayu"	Eliminated
Episode 21 (Thursday, November 21, 2019)	Armand Maulana	3	Bagus Agung	"American Idiot"	Public's vote
Episode 21 (Thursday, November 21, 2019)	Armand Maulana	4	Elly Chia	"Suratku"/"Merenda Kasih"	Public's vote
Episode 21 (Thursday, November 21, 2019)	Titi DJ	5	Vionita Veronika	"I Love You 3000"	Public's vote
Episode 21 (Thursday, November 21, 2019)	Vidi & Nino	6	Tesalonika Manalu	"Don't You Worry 'Bout a Thing"	Public's vote

=== Week 6: Finale (November 28) ===
Episode	Coach	Order	Artist	Song	Result
Episode 22 (Thursday, November 28, 2019)	Titi DJ	1	Vionita Veronika	"Meraih Bintang"	Winner
Episode 22 (Thursday, November 28, 2019)	Isyana Sarasvati	2	Nikita Becker	"Kupu-kupu"	Fourth Place
Episode 22 (Thursday, November 28, 2019)	Armand Maulana	3	Elly Chia	"Welcome to the Black Parade"	Runner-Up
Episode 22 (Thursday, November 28, 2019)	Armand Maulana	4	Bagus Agung	"Sempurna/11 Januari"	Fifth Place
Episode 22 (Thursday, November 28, 2019)	Vidi & Nino	5	Tesalonika Manalu	"Matahariku"	Third Place

Non-competition performances
Order	Performer	Song
1	Armand and his team (Gus Agung & Elly Chia)	Nirwana
2	Claudia Emmanuela Santoso	"Cinta Luar Biasa" & "Goodbye"
3	Vidi & Nino and their team (Tesa Manalu)	Dekat di Hati & 50 Tahun Lagi
4	Ayu Tingting	Dhoom Machale Dhoom & "Sambalado"
5	All Coaches	Hanya Memuji & Berharap Tak Berpisah
6	Titi DJ and Her Team (Vionita Veronika)	"Bahasa Kalbu"
7	Isyana and Her Team (Nikita Becker)	"Kau Adalah"

== Elimination Charts ==
=== Overall ===
Color key
Artist's info

- Team Armand
- Team Titi
- Team Vidi & Nino
- Team Isyana

Result details

- Winner
- Runner-up
- Third place
- Fourth place
- Fifth place
- Saved by the public
- Saved by his/her coach
- Eliminated

Live show results per week
Artists	Week 1	Week 2	Week 3	Week 4	Week 5	Finale
Vionita Veronika	Safe	Safe	Safe	Safe	Safe	Winner
Elly Chia	Safe	Safe	Safe	Safe	Safe	Runner-up
Tesalonika Manalu	Safe	Safe	Safe	Safe	Safe	3rd Place
Nikita Becker	Safe	Safe	Safe	Safe	Safe	4th Place
Bagus Agung	Safe	Safe	Safe	Safe	Safe	5th Place
Kaleb Jonathaniel	Safe	Safe	Safe	Safe	Eliminated	Eliminated (Week 5)
Natasya & Hizkia	Safe	Safe	Safe	Eliminated	Eliminated (Week 4)	
Genya Kurnain	Safe	Safe	Eliminated	Eliminated (Week 3)		
Belinda Khaerana	Safe	Eliminated	Eliminated (Week 2)			
Ferlita Ningtyas	Safe	Eliminated	Eliminated (Week 2)			
Joy Fernando	Safe	Eliminated	Eliminated (Week 2)			
Suci Yantini	Safe	Eliminated	Eliminated (Week 2)			
Gery & Ganhy	Eliminated	Eliminated (Week 1)				
Jordie Yose	Eliminated	Eliminated (Week 1)				
Tommy Vincent	Eliminated	Eliminated (Week 1)				
Trianetha Henuk	Eliminated	Eliminated (Week 1)				
Wijaya Kusuma	Eliminated	Eliminated (Week 1)				

=== Team ===
Color key
Artist's info

- Team Armand
- Team Titi
- Team Vidi & Nino
- Team Isyana

Result details

- Winner
- Runner-up
- Third place
- Fourth place
- Fifth place
- Eliminated

Live show results per week
Artist	Week 1	Week 2	Week 3	Week 4	Week 5	Finale
Elly Chia	Public's vote	Public's vote	Advanced	Advanced	Advanced	Runner-up
Bagus Agung	Public's vote	Coach's choice	Advanced	Advanced	Advanced	Fifth Place
Suci Yantini	Coach's choice	Eliminated				
Jordie Yose	Eliminated					
Trianetha Henuk	Eliminated					
Vionita Veronika	Public's vote	Public's vote	Advanced	Advanced	Advanced	Winner
Genya Kurnain	Public's vote	Coach's choice	Eliminated			
Ferlita Ningtyas	Coach's choice	Eliminated				
Wijaya Kusuma	Eliminated					
Tesalonika Manalu	Public's vote	Public's vote	Advanced	Advanced	Advanced	Third Place
Natasya & Hizkia	Coach's choice	Coach's choice	Advanced	Eliminated		
Belinda Khaerana	Public's vote	Eliminated				
Gery & Ganhy	Eliminated					
Nikita Becker	Public's vote	Coach's choice	Advanced	Advanced	Advanced	Fourth Place
Kaleb Jonathaniel	Coach's choice	Public's vote	Advanced	Advanced	Eliminated	
Joy Fernando	Public's vote	Eliminated				
Tommy Vincent	Eliminated					
