= The Voice Indonesia season 3 =

The Voice Indonesia
- Season 3
- Hosted by: Ananda Omesh; Astrid Tiar
- Coaches: Armand Maulana; Anggun; Anindyo Baskoro & Vidi Aldiano (duo); Titi DJ
- Winner: Ronaldo Longa
- Winning coach: Armand Maulana
- Runner-up: Rambu Piras

Release
- Original network: GTV
- Original release: November 1, 2018 – March 28, 2019

Season chronology
- ← Previous; Season 2 Next → Season 4

The third season of the Indonesian reality singing competition The Voice Indonesia premiered on November 1, 2018 on GTV. Ananda Omesh from the Kids' edition came to host the show alongside Astrid Tiar. All coaches from the second season did not return and were then replaced by Armand Maulana, Anggun, Titi DJ, and the first duo coach ever on the show, Anindyo Baskoro and Vidi Aldiano. Ronaldo Longa won The Competition making Armand First win as a coach and the third male coach to win the show (after coach Giring and Coach Kaka)

== Auditions ==
Contestant auditions were held in these cities:

Schedule of The Voice Indonesia auditions
Type of audition	City	Date	Location	Ref.
Open Audition	Kupang	July 7, 2018	Sahid T-More Hotel	
Open Audition	Semarang	July 7, 2018	Pop Hotel Pemuda	
Open Audition	Palembang	July 7, 2018	Dermaga Convention Center	
Private Audition	Tegal	July 8, 2018	Radio Gama FM	
Private Audition	Tasikmalaya	July 10, 2018	Style Radio	
Private Audition	Sukabumi	July 12, 2018	NBS Radio	
Private Audition	Manado	July 14, 2018	Motion Radio Manado	
Open Audition	Denpasar	July 14, 2018	Phoenix Radio Bali	
Open Audition	Medan	July 14, 2018	Ibis Hotel Pattimura	
Open Audition	Bandung	July 14, 2018	Golden Flower Hotel Bunga	
Open Audition	Makassar	July 21, 2018	Hotel Pesonna Makassar	
Big Audition	Surabaya	July 21, 2018	Hotel Grand Inna Tunjungan	
Private Audition	Bandar Lampung	July 21, 2018	D Radio FM	
Open Audition	Ambon	July 28, 2018	Ambon Manise Hotel	
Open Audition	Balikpapan	July 28, 2018	Ibis Hotel Balikpapan	
Open Audition	Malang	July 28, 2018	Hotel Sahid Montana Dua	
Open Audition	Banjarmasin	August 4, 2018	Fave Hotel Banjarmasin	
Big Audition	Jakarta	August 4 & 5, 2018	Studio 18 MNC Studios	

== Coaches and hosts ==
In August 2018, it was announced that all coaches from the second season Ari Lasso, Akhadi "Kaka" Wira Satriaji, Agnez Mo and Judika would not return and were then replaced by Anggun, Titi DJ, Vidi Aldiano and Anindyo Baskoro. Meanwhile, Armand Maulana, who was in the first season, would return. Daniel Mananta also would not return again as host, and replaced by Ananda Omesh, that hosted this season together with Astrid Tiar.

== Teams ==
Color Key

- Winner
- Runner-up
- Third place
- Fourth place
- Eliminated in the Live Shows
- Eliminated in the Playoffs
- Artist was stolen by another coach in the Battle rounds
- Eliminated in the Battle rounds
- Artist was stolen by another coach in the Knockout rounds
- Eliminated in the Knockout rounds

Coaches	Top 80					
Armand Maulana						
Armand Maulana	Ronaldo Longa	Virzha Ikhtiarini	Anggi Marito	Octarianti Artha	Anis Novinda	Christiana Chindy
Armand Maulana	Daniel Jonathan	Ramanda Almuna	~~Eunike Bella~~	~~Taufik Hidayat~~	Adelia Budhiansyah	Ayu Adhistya
Armand Maulana	Kardia Ivana	~~Abraham Ewaldo~~	~~Anis Novinda~~	~~Faisal Kevin~~	Almira Andani	Boy Gantana
Armand Maulana	Erlin Regina	Iva Andina	Mattheos Immanuel	Matthew Chosta	Yona Thandra	—N/a
Anggun C. Sasmi						
Anggun C. Sasmi	Rambu Piras	I Made Avapayatha	Eunike Bella	King Daepanie	Alisha Mikaila	Novia Bachmid
Anggun C. Sasmi	Rena Pradhita	Taufik Hidayat	~~Jasmine Risach~~	Abraham Ewaldo	Adinda Nurul	Derry Ariska
Anggun C. Sasmi	Robinson Tahalele	Thalia Charisma	~~Ronaldo Magang~~	Annisa Nurfauzi	Ayu Rahayu	Melky Isandro
Anggun C. Sasmi	Moza Daegal	Patrick & Albert	Salsabila Septia	Shakila Marseli	Sursar Pardomuan	Syahril Ridwan
Anindyo Baskoro & Vidi Aldiano						
Anindyo Baskoro & Vidi Aldiano	Gok Parasian	Philipus Joseph	Agseisa Galuh	Jasmine Risach	Faisal Kevin	Jaqlien Elsy
Anindyo Baskoro & Vidi Aldiano	Richard Jeremy	Shafira Putri	~~Dodi Rozano~~	Annisa Setianingsih^{a}	Daniel Frendi	Ingrid Tamara
Anindyo Baskoro & Vidi Aldiano	Naila Syarafina	~~Christiana Chindy~~	~~King Daepanie~~	Christian Jeremia	Fanny Vanessa	Kurniarani Litha
Anindyo Baskoro & Vidi Aldiano	Nabila Wahyuningtyas	Nadhira Septamara	Sandy Orlando	Talitha Adinda	Zahra Azizah	—N/a
Titi DJ						
Titi DJ	Febrian Ihsan	Waode Andraini	Gancar Asanegara	Hendra Jogi	Anggraeiny Faradhita	Dodi Rozano
Titi DJ	Keisha Andaviar	Priscilla Evangelinna	~~Anis Novinda~~	Eunice Margaretha	Julandri Mustafa	Nadya & Nada
Titi DJ	Ronaldo Magang	~~Anggi Marito~~	~~Gok Parasian~~	Clarinta Ega	Devi Casthio	Indra Kesuma
Titi DJ	Maria Gabriella	Pancary Pandawa	Pieter Saparuane	Rizma Aprilia	Sarah Latifa	—N/a
Note: Italicized names are stolen contestants (names struck through within former teams). Underlined names are artists who were saved by their coach in the Battles and advanced to the Live Shows.

Note
a. originally auditioned together with Kiki Kadariah, but coaches Armand Maulana, Vidi Aldiano and Anindyo "Nino" Baskoro, who turned, prefer to have only Annisa advancing to the next round due to being interested in only one voice, which is Annisa's. They then agreed that only Annisa will advance. Annisa eventually chose Vidi & Nino.

== Blind auditions ==
Color key

✔	Coach hit his/her "I WANT YOU" button
	Artist defaulted to this coach's team
	Artist elected to join this coach's team
	Artist received a "Four-Chair Turn"
	Artist eliminated with no coach pressing his or her "I WANT YOU" button

=== Episode 1 (November 1, 2018) ===
Order	Artist	Age	Hometown	Song	Coach's and artist's choices			
Order	Artist	Age	Hometown	Song	Armand	Anggun	Vidi & Nino	Titi
1	Rambu Piras	35	Kupang	"This Is Me"	✔	✔	✔	✔
2	I Made Avapayatha	25	Bali	"Always Be My Baby"	✔	✔	✔	–
3	Faisal Kevin	25	Bandung	"History"	✔	–	–	–
4	Indra Kesuma	23	Medan	"Let It Go"	–	✔	–	✔
5	Virzha Ikhtiarini	16	Surabaya	"Royals"	✔	–	–	✔
6	Nabila Wahyuningtyas	22	Yogyakarta	"Pelangi di Matamu"	–	–	✔	✔
7	Louisa Rahmacynta	19	Jakarta	"Aku Ini Punya Siapa"	–	–	–	–
8	Daniel Jonathan	24	Bogor	"Stand By Me"	✔	✔	✔	✔
9	Richard Jeremy	22	Bogor	"Dewi"	✔	✔	✔	✔
10	Anggi Marito	16	Batam	"What About Us"	✔	–	–	✔

=== Episode 2 (November 8, 2018) ===
Order	Artist	Age	Hometown	Song	Coach's and artist's choices			
Order	Artist	Age	Hometown	Song	Armand	Anggun	Vidi & Nino	Titi
1	Gok Parasian	25	Medan	"Kisah Romantis"	✔	✔	✔	✔
2	Jasmine Risach	17	Makassar	"Sampai Jadi Debu"	✔	✔	–	–
3	Derry Ariska	24	Bekasi	"I'll Make Love to You"	–	✔	–	–
4	Mattheos Immanuel	36	Kupang	"Mustang Sally"	✔	✔	✔	–
5	Fadly Zulfikar	16	Tangerang	"Uptown Funk"	–	–	–	–
6	Talitha Adinda	17	Jakarta	"Lovin' You"	✔	–	✔	✔
7	Julandri Mustafa	25	Kupang	"Best Part"	–	✔	✔	✔
8	Igedhen Kosim	26	Tegal	"Roxanne"	–	–	–	–
9	Eunike Bella	21	Semarang	"Teka-teki"	✔	–	–	–
10	Ayu Rahayu	28	Denpasar	"Yang Aku Tunggu"	–	✔	–	–
11	Kurniarani Litha	29	Samarinda	"Wonderwall"	✔	✔	✔	✔

=== Episode 3 (November 15, 2018) ===
Order	Artist	Age	Hometown	Song	Coach's and artist's choices			
Order	Artist	Age	Hometown	Song	Armand	Anggun	Vidi & Nino	Titi
1	Agseisa Galuh	24	Banjarmasin	"Rock with You"	✔	✔	✔	✔
2	Matthew Chosta	22	Bandung	"Ada yang Hilang"	✔	✔	–	–
3	Priscilla Evangelinna	22	Jakarta	"Stone Cold"	✔	–	–	✔
4	Syahril Ridwan	26	Adonara	"Yang Terlupakan"	–	✔	–	✔
5	Keisha Andaviar	22	Jakarta	"Wild World"	–	✔	–	✔
6	Ridwan Dharmawan	24	Bandung	"Don't Stop Me Now"	–	–	–	–
7	Dodi Rozano	25	Bangka Belitung	"Deen Assalam"	✔	✔	✔	✔
8	Nadila Amalia	19	Bali	"Mercy"	–	–	–	–
9	Sursar Pardomuan	32	Jakarta	"Wrecking Ball"	–	✔	–	–
10	Ronaldo Longa	17	Bajawa	"Langit Abu-abu"	✔	✔	✔	✔

=== Episode 4 (November 22, 2018) ===
Order	Artist	Age	Hometown	Song	Coach's and artist's choices			
Order	Artist	Age	Hometown	Song	Armand	Anggun	Vidi & Nino	Titi
1	Jaqlien Elsy	20	Makassar	"Gravity"	✔	✔	✔	✔
2	Hendra Jogi	24	Medan	"Tanya Hati"	✔	–	–	✔
3	Ramanda Almuna	23	Tasikmalaya	"Rock and Roll"	✔	✔	✔	✔
4	Almira Andani	20	Serang	"Scared to Be Lonely"	✔	–	–	–
5	Maria Elena	17	Jakarta	"Location"	–	–	–	–
6	Ronaldo Magang	17	Atambua	"Damai Bersamamu"	–	✔	–	✔
7	Fanny Vanessa	20	Bandung	"Mantan Terindah"	–	–	✔	–
8	Thalia Charisma	20	Surabaya	"Pacar Lima Langkah"	–	✔	–	–
9	Yohanna Febianti	28	Malang	"Bidadari Tak Bersayap"	–	–	–	–
10	Gancar Asanegara	25	Purwokerto	"Panah Asmara"	–	–	✔	✔

=== Episode 5 (November 29, 2018) ===
Order	Artist	Age	Hometown	Song	Coach's and artist's choices			
Order	Artist	Age	Hometown	Song	Armand	Anggun	Vidi & Nino	Titi
1	Adinda Nurul	19	Medan	"Selalu Cinta"	–	✔	✔	–
2	Waode Andraini	21	Baubau	"Bukan Cinta Biasa"	–	✔	–	✔
3	Octarianti Artha	20	Bekasi	"Mamma Knows Best"	✔	✔	✔	✔
4	Ingrid Tamara	24	Jakarta	"Paris in the Rain"	✔	✔	✔	✔
5	Yona Thandra	21	Bengkayang	"Lovesong"	✔	–	–	✔
6	Zahra Azizah	20	Bandung	"Ride"	–	–	✔	–
7	Barry Sofyan	25	Kupang	"Sahabat Jadi Cinta"	–	–	–	–
8	Patrick & Albert	25 & 32	Ambon	"Inikah Cinta"	–	✔	–	–
9	Maria Gabriella	19	Jakarta	"Price Tag"	–	–	–	✔

=== Episode 6 (December 6, 2018) ===
Order	Artist	Age	Hometown	Song	Coach's and artist's choices			
Order	Artist	Age	Hometown	Song	Armand	Anggun	Vidi & Nino	Titi
1	Novia Bachmid	16	Manado	"Titanium"	✔	✔	✔	✔
2	Abraham Ewaldo	19	Bogor	"Vittoria, mio core"	✔	–	–	–
3	Robinson Tahalele	36	Surabaya	"Stay with Me"	✔	✔	–	–
4	Rena Pradhita	27	Bandung	"Put Your Records On"	✔	✔	✔	✔
5	Adelia Budhiansyah	27	Jakarta	"Alone"	✔	–	–	–
6	Fajar Wicaksana	22	Bogor	"Hero"	–	–	–	–
7	Naila Syarafina	16	Jakarta	"Idontwannabeyouanymore"	✔	–	✔	–
8	Anggraeiny Faradhita	21	Penajam Paser Utara	"Set Fire to the Rain"	–	–	–	✔
9	Febrian Ihsan	21	Bandung	"So Sick"	✔	–	–	✔
10	Lodewyk Hahury	30	Ambon	"One Last Cry"	–	–	–	–
11	Iva Andina	34	Jakarta	"Never Enough"	✔	–	–	–

=== Episode 7 (December 13, 2018) ===
Order	Artist	Age	Hometown	Song	Coach's and artist's choices			
Order	Artist	Age	Hometown	Song	Armand	Anggun	Vidi & Nino	Titi
1	Philipus Joseph	29	Bajawa	"We Just Don't Care"	✔	✔	✔	✔
2	Shafira Putri	18	Surabaya	"Sang Dewi"	–	–	✔	–
3	Pieter Saparuane	36	Ambon	"To Love Somebody"	✔	✔	✔	✔
4	Eunice Margaretha	25	Surabaya	"Buktikan"	–	–	–	✔
5	Nadya & Nada	18	Makassar	"Dekat di Hati"	✔	–	✔	✔
6	Gabriella Avendri	26	Jakarta	"Piece by Piece"	–	–	–	–
7	Erlin Regina	18	Surabaya	"Kau Adalah"	✔	–	–	✔
8	Kalvino Marko	20	Bintuni	"Cukup Tau"	–	–	–	–
9	Moza Daegal	26	Lampung	"Havana"	–	✔	–	–
10	Annisa Nurfauzi	16	Bandung	"Bintang Kehidupan"	–	✔	–	–

=== Episode 8 (December 20, 2018) ===
Order	Artist	Age	Hometown	Song	Coach's and artist's choices			
Order	Artist	Age	Hometown	Song	Armand	Anggun	Vidi & Nino	Titi
1	Sandy Orlando	18	Ambon	"Lost Stars"	✔	✔	✔	✔
2	Pancary Pandawa	20	Surabaya	"Crazy Little Thing Called Love"	–	–	–	✔
3	Taufik Hidayat	29	Denpasar	"Benci Untuk Mencinta"	✔	✔	✔	✔
4	Boy Gantana	37	Kuningan	"Semut Hitam"	✔	–	–	–
5	Shinta Inara	17	Surabaya	"Let It Go"	–	–	–	–
6	Nadhira Septamara	17	Malang	"Better When I'm Dancin'"	–	–	✔	–
7	Fahmi Rois	21	Salatiga	"Teman Bahagia"	–	–	–	–
8	Clarinta Ega	16	Bekasi	"Domino"	–	–	–	✔
9	Salma Salsabil	16	Surabaya	"I Put a Spell on You"	–	–	–	–
10	Shakila Marseli	19	Sukabumi	"Wolves"	–	✔	–	–

=== Episode 9 (December 27, 2018) ===
Order	Artist	Age	Hometown	Song	Coach's and artist's choices			
Order	Artist	Age	Hometown	Song	Armand	Anggun	Vidi & Nino	Titi
1	Christiana Chindy	24	Jakarta	"Warrior"	✔	✔	✔	✔
2	Anis Novinda	19	Banjarmasin	"It Don't Mean a Thing"	✔	–	–	–
3	Annisa & Kiki^{a}	34 & 50^{a}	Tasikmalaya	"Cinta Jangan Kau Pergi"	✔	–	✔	–
4	Devi Casthio	20	Bali	"Girl on Fire"	–	–	–	✔
5	Kardia Ivana	24	Salatiga	"Pupus"	✔	–	–	–
6	Reza Fahlevi	20	Banda Aceh	"Adventure of a Lifetime"	–	–	–	–
7	Daniel Frendi	25	Pangkal Pinang	"Dari Mata"	✔	✔	✔	✔
8	Hestyari Mustika	23	Bekasi	"Bring Me to Life"	–	–	–	–
9	Sarah Latifa	19	Makassar	"If I Were a Boy"	–	–	–	✔
10	Gaudensius Deppa	23	Waingapu	"Your Man"	–	–	–	–
11	Alisha Mikaila	17	Bogor	"Just Friends"	–	✔	–	–

Note
a. Annisa Setianingsih initially auditioned together with Kiki Kadariah, but coaches Armand Maulana, Vidi Aldiano and Anindyo "Nino" Baskoro, who turned, prefer to have only Annisa advancing to the next round due to being interested in only one voice, which is Annisa's. They then agreed that only Annisa will advance. Annisa eventually chose Vidi & Nino.

=== Episode 10 (January 3, 2019) ===
Order	Artist	Age	Hometown	Song	Coach's and artist's choices			
Order	Artist	Age	Hometown	Song	Armand	Anggun	Vidi & Nino	Titi
1	Salsabila Septia	19	Bekasi	"Emotions"	✔	✔	✔	✔
2	King Daepanie	19	Kupang	"You're Beautiful"	–	–	✔	–
3	Rizma Aprilia	21	Jakarta	"Mau Dibawa Ke Mana"	✔	–	–	✔
4	Vito Oebisono	25	Saparua	"Stand by Me"	–	–	–	Team full
5	Christian Jeremia	25	Manado	"Lebih Indah"	–	✔	✔	Team full
6	Kysha Rahmadani	20	Samarinda	"Lovefool"	–	–	Team full	Team full
7	Melky Isandro	23	Manado	"Lapang Dada"	–	✔	Team full	Team full
8	Jonathan Karosekali	41	Medan	"When a Man Loves a Woman"	–	Team full	Team full	Team full
9	Ayu Adhistya	21	Sukabumi	"Englishman in New York"	✔	Team full	Team full	Team full

== The Knockouts ==
The Knockouts will be aired from Thursday, January 10, 2019. At this stage, the coaches can steal two losing artists from another coach.

Color key:

	Artist won the Knockout and advanced to the Battles
	Artist lost the Knockout but was stolen by another coach and advanced to the Battles
	Artist lost the Knockout and was eliminated
✔	Coach originally had his/her steals full, but then pressed his/her steal button again

Episode	Coach	Order	Song	Artists		Song	'Steal' result			
Episode	Coach	Order	Song	Winner	Loser	Song	Armand	Anggun	Vidi & Nino	Titi
Episode 11 (Thursday, January 10, 2019)	Armand	1	"I Am Changing"	Octarianti Artha	Abraham Ewaldo	"You Raise Me Up"	—N/a	✔	✔	–
Episode 11 (Thursday, January 10, 2019)	Anggun	2	"Try"	Rambu Piras	Ayu Rahayu	"...Baby One More Time"	–	—N/a	–	–
Episode 11 (Thursday, January 10, 2019)	Vidi & Nino	3	"Ddu-Du Ddu-Du"	Jaqlien Elsy	Zahra Azizah	"Ku Ingin Kembali"	–	–	—N/a	–
Episode 11 (Thursday, January 10, 2019)	Armand	4	"The Man Who Can't Be Moved"	Taufik Hidayat	Faisal Kevin	"Girls Like You"	—N/a	–	✔	–
Episode 11 (Thursday, January 10, 2019)	Titi DJ	5	"Attention"	Hendra Jogi	Devi Casthio	"Salahkah Aku Terlalu Mencintaimu"	–	–	–	—N/a
Episode 11 (Thursday, January 10, 2019)	Anggun	6	"Nothing Else Matters"	Rena Pradhita	Melky Isandro	"Hey, Soul Sister"	–	—N/a	–	–
Episode 11 (Thursday, January 10, 2019)	Titi DJ	7	"Oh Kasih"	Julandri Mustafa	Maria Gabriella	"Katakan Tidak"	–	–	–	—N/a
Episode 11 (Thursday, January 10, 2019)	Vidi & Nino	8	"Finesse"	Ingrid Tamara	Fanny Vanessa	"Jangan Kau Bohong"	–	–	—N/a	–
Episode 12 (Thursday, January 17, 2019)	Anggun	1	"Jikalau Kau Cinta"	Robinson Tahalele	Ronaldo Magang	"Tak Bisa Ke Lain Hati"	✔	—N/a	✔	✔
Episode 12 (Thursday, January 17, 2019)	Titi DJ	2	"Dancing On My Own"	Keisha Andaviar	Pancary Pandawa	"Tendangan dari Langit"	–	–	–	—N/a
Episode 12 (Thursday, January 17, 2019)	Armand	3	"Counting Stars"	Ronaldo Longa	Yona Thandra	"Film Favorit"	—N/a	–	–	–
Episode 12 (Thursday, January 17, 2019)	Titi DJ	4	"Fight Song"	Priscilla Evangelinna	Anggi Marito	"How Far I'll Go"	✔	–	–	—N/a
Episode 12 (Thursday, January 17, 2019)	Vidi & Nino	5	"Youngblood"	Agseisa Galuh	Kurniarani Litha	"Monokrom"	–	–	—N/a	–
Episode 12 (Thursday, January 17, 2019)	Titi DJ	6	"Anganku Anganmu"	Nadya & Nada	Sarah Latifa	"Selamat Jalan Kekasih"	–	–	–	—N/a
Episode 12 (Thursday, January 17, 2019)	Anggun	7	"Cinta"	Alisha Mikaila	Shakila Marseli	"We Can't Stop"	–	—N/a	–	–
Episode 12 (Thursday, January 17, 2019)	Vidi & Nino	8	"Here"	Naila Syarafina	Talitha Adinda	"Lagi Syantik"	–	–	—N/a	–
Episode 13 (Thursday, January 24, 2019)	Titi DJ	1	"Dia"	Gancar Asanegara	Gok Parasian	"Cemburu"	–	–	✔	—N/a
Episode 13 (Thursday, January 24, 2019)	Vidi & Nino	2	"Yang Kumau"	Annisa Setianingsih	Nabila Wahyuningtyas	"Harus Bahagia"	–	–	Team full	–
Episode 13 (Thursday, January 24, 2019)	Anggun	3	"Misteri Cinta"	Adinda Nurul	Annisa Nurfauzi	"Rocker Juga Manusia"	–	—N/a	Team full	–
Episode 13 (Thursday, January 24, 2019)	Anggun	4	"Gubrak Gubrak Gubrak Jeng Jeng Jeng"	Thalia Charisma	Patrick & Albert	"Yang Penting Happy"	–	—N/a	Team full	–
Episode 13 (Thursday, January 24, 2019)	Armand	5	"Karma"	Adelia Budhiansyah	Mattheos Immanuel	"Come Together"	—N/a	–	Team full	–
Episode 13 (Thursday, January 24, 2019)	Vidi & Nino	6	"Cukup Sudah"	Dodi Rozano	Christian Jeremia	"There's Nothing Holdin' Me Back"	–	–	Team full	–
Episode 13 (Thursday, January 24, 2019)	Armand	7	"Bad Day"	Daniel Jonathan	Matthew Chosta	"Use Somebody"	—N/a	–	Team full	–
Episode 13 (Thursday, January 24, 2019)	Vidi & Nino	8	"Day 1"	Richard Jeremy	Nadhira Septamara	"Flashlight"	–	–	Team full	–
Episode 14 (Thursday, January 31, 2019)	Armand	1	"Whataya Want from Me"	Ramanda Almuna	Boy Gantana	"Bunga"	—N/a	–	Team full	–
Episode 14 (Thursday, January 31, 2019)	Armand	2	"Sweet Talk"	Eunike Bella	Almira Andani	"IDGAF"	—N/a	–	Team full	–
Episode 14 (Thursday, January 31, 2019)	Anggun	3	"Stronger"	Novia Bachmid	Salsabila Septia	"Against All Odds"	–	—N/a	Team full	–
Episode 14 (Thursday, January 31, 2019)	Titi DJ	4	"Million Reasons"	Anggraeiny Faradhita	Pieter Saparuane	"Tak Pernah Setengah Hati"	–	–	Team full	—N/a
Episode 14 (Thursday, January 31, 2019)	Vidi & Nino	5	"Lihatlah Lebih Dekat"	Shafira Putri	Christiana Chindy	"Through the Rain"	✔	–	Team full	–
Episode 14 (Thursday, January 31, 2019)	Titi DJ	6	"Perfect Strangers"	Febrian Ihsan	Rizma Aprilia	"Jangan"	Team full	–	Team full	—N/a
Episode 14 (Thursday, January 31, 2019)	Vidi & Nino	7	"Let Me Love You"	Daniel Frendi	Sandy Orlando	"Million Years Ago"	Team full	–	Team full	–
Episode 14 (Thursday, January 31, 2019)	Anggun	8	"Zombie"	I Made Avapayatha	Syahril Ridwan	"Separuh Aku"	Team full	—N/a	Team full	–
Episode 15 (Thursday, February 7, 2019)	Armand	1	"Don't You Remember"	Virzha Ikhtiarini	Anis Novinda	"Well, Well, Well"	Team full	–	✔	✔
Episode 15 (Thursday, February 7, 2019)	Anggun	2	"Crazy"	Jasmine Risach	Moza Daegal	"Moving On"	Team full	—N/a	Team full	Team full
Episode 15 (Thursday, February 7, 2019)	Anggun	3	"Locked Out of Heaven"	Derry Ariska	Sursar Pardomuan	"Feel"	Team full	—N/a	Team full	Team full
Episode 15 (Thursday, February 7, 2019)	Titi DJ	4	"Heart Attack"	Eunice Margaretha	Indra Kesuma	"Viva la Vida"	Team full	–	Team full	Team full
Episode 15 (Thursday, February 7, 2019)	Vidi & Nino	5	"Risalah Hati"	Philipus Joseph	King Daepanie	"Satu"	Team full	✔	Team full	Team full
Episode 15 (Thursday, February 7, 2019)	Armand	6	"Clarity"	Kardia Ivana	Iva Andina	"Love Me like You Do"	Team full	Team full	Team full	Team full
Episode 15 (Thursday, February 7, 2019)	Armand	7	"Sit Still, Look Pretty"	Ayu Adhistya	Erlin Regina	"Dengan Caraku"	Team full	Team full	Team full	Team full
Episode 15 (Thursday, February 7, 2019)	Titi DJ	8	"Tegar"	Waode Andraini	Clarinta Ega	"Roar"	Team full	Team full	Team full	Team full

== The Battles ==
The Battle Rounds started on February 14. The coaches have either one steal and one save or two steals (meaning the coaches can not save twice). The top 32 contestants then moved on to the Live Shows. Advisors for this season are: Maia Estianty working with Team Armand, Melly Goeslaw for Team Anggun, season 1 coach Sherina Munaf helping Team Vidi-Nino, and Indra Lesmana assisting Team Titi.

Color key:

Artist won the Battle and advanced to the Live Shows
Artist lost the Battle but was Saved by another coach or their coach and advanced to the Live Shows
Artist lost the Battle and was eliminated

Episode	Coach	Order	Winner	Song	Loser	'Steal' and 'Save' result			
Episode	Coach	Order	Winner	Song	Loser	Armand	Anggun	Vidi & Nino	Titi
Episode 16 (Thursday, February 14, 2019)	Titi DJ	1	Hendra Jogi	"The Way You Make Me Feel"	Anis Novinda	✔	–	–	—N/a
Episode 16 (Thursday, February 14, 2019)	Vidi & Nino	2	Richard Jeremy	"You Are the Reason"	Naila Syarafina	–	–	—N/a	–
Episode 16 (Thursday, February 14, 2019)	Anggun	3	Novia Bachmid	"Beautiful"	Adinda Nurul	–	—N/a	–	–
Episode 16 (Thursday, February 14, 2019)	Armand	4	Anggi Marito	"Tetap Dalam Jiwa"	Ayu Adhistya	—N/a	–	–	–
Episode 16 (Thursday, February 14, 2019)	Armand	5	Ramanda Almuna	"I Finally Found Someone"	Kardia Ivana	—N/a	–	–	–
Episode 16 (Thursday, February 14, 2019)	Vidi & Nino	6	Philipus Joseph	"Untukku"	Shafira Putri	✔	✔	✔	–
Episode 16 (Thursday, February 14, 2019)	Titi DJ	7	Keisha Andaviar	"New Rules"	Nadya & Nada	–	–	–	—N/a
Episode 16 (Thursday, February 14, 2019)	Anggun	8	Alisha Mikaila	"Seven Nation Army"	Jasmine Risach	–	—N/a	✔	–
Episode 17 (Thursday, February 21, 2019)	Vidi & Nino	1	Agseisa Galuh	"Bahasa Kalbu" (from Cinta)	Annisa Setianingsih	–	–	Team full	–
Episode 17 (Thursday, February 21, 2019)	Vidi & Nino	2	Gok Parasian	"Somebody to Love"	Dodi Rozano	✔	✔	Team full	✔
Episode 17 (Thursday, February 21, 2019)	Armand	3	Octarianti Artha	"Survivor"	Adelia Budhiansyah	—N/a	–	Team full	–
Episode 17 (Thursday, February 21, 2019)	Titi DJ	4	Febrian Ihsan	"Tak Akan Ada Cinta yang Lain"	Ronaldo Magang	–	–	Team full	—N/a
Episode 17 (Thursday, February 21, 2019)	Anggun	5	I Made Avapayatha	"The Reason"	Derry Ariska	–	—N/a	Team full	–
Episode 17 (Thursday, February 21, 2019)	Armand	6	Ronaldo Longa	"Bang Bang Tut"	Taufik Hidayat	—N/a	✔	Team full	–
Episode 17 (Thursday, February 21, 2019)	Vidi & Nino	7	Jaqlien Elsy	"Zona Nyaman"	Ingrid Tamara	–	–	Team full	–
Episode 17 (Thursday, February 21, 2019)	Anggun	8	King Daepanie	"Too Good at Goodbyes"	Robinson Tahalele	–	—N/a	Team full	–
Episode 18 (Thursday, February 28, 2019)	Titi DJ	1	Waode Andraini	"Cinta" (from Tentang Dia)	Priscilla Evangelinna	–	–	Team full	✔
Episode 18 (Thursday, February 28, 2019)	Armand	2	Virzha Ikhtiarini	"Shallow"	Eunike Bella	✔	✔	Team full	Team full
Episode 18 (Thursday, February 28, 2019)	Vidi & Nino	3	Faisal Kevin	"I Want It That Way"	Daniel Frendi	–	Team full	Team full	Team full
Episode 18 (Thursday, February 28, 2019)	Titi DJ	4	Anggraeiny Faradhita	"Cinta"	Eunice Margaretha	–	Team full	Team full	Team full
Episode 18 (Thursday, February 28, 2019)	Armand	5	Daniel Jonathan	"Tersiksa Lagi"	Christiana Chindy	✔	Team full	Team full	Team full
Episode 18 (Thursday, February 28, 2019)	Titi DJ	6	Gancar Asanegara	"When I Was Your Man"	Julandri Mustafa	Team full	Team full	Team full	Team full
Episode 18 (Thursday, February 28, 2019)	Anggun	7	Rena Pradhita	"Genie in a Bottle"	Thalia Charisma	Team full	Team full	Team full	Team full
Episode 18 (Thursday, February 28, 2019)	Anggun	8	Rambu Piras	"I'd Do Anything for Love"	Abraham Ewaldo	Team full	Team full	Team full	Team full

== Live Shows ==
Color key:

Artist was saved by the Public's votes
Artist was saved by his/her coach
Artist was eliminated

=== Week 1: Top 32, Group 1 (March 7) ===
Episode	Coach	Order	Artist	Song	Result
Episode 19 (Thursday, March 7, 2019)	Titi DJ	1	Priscilla Evangelinna	"Bang Bang"	Eliminated
Episode 19 (Thursday, March 7, 2019)	Titi DJ	2	Hendra Jogi	"Sang Penggoda"	Titi's choice
Episode 19 (Thursday, March 7, 2019)	Titi DJ	3	Waode Andraini	"I'll Never Love Again"	Public's vote
Episode 19 (Thursday, March 7, 2019)	Titi DJ	4	Dodi Rozano	"Hanya Engkau yang Bisa"	Eliminated
Episode 19 (Thursday, March 7, 2019)	Anggun	5	Rambu Piras	"Kaulah Segalanya"	Public's vote
Episode 19 (Thursday, March 7, 2019)	Anggun	6	Alisha Mikaila	"Never Too Much"	Eliminated
Episode 19 (Thursday, March 7, 2019)	Anggun	7	King Daepanie	"How Deep Is Your Love"	Anggun's choice
Episode 19 (Thursday, March 7, 2019)	Anggun	8	Rena Pradhita	"You Know I'm No Good"	Eliminated
Episode 19 (Thursday, March 7, 2019)	Armand Maulana	9	Daniel Jonathan	"Aku Cinta Kau dan Dia"	Eliminated
Episode 19 (Thursday, March 7, 2019)	Armand Maulana	10	Virzha Ikhtiarini	"Friends"	Public's vote
Episode 19 (Thursday, March 7, 2019)	Armand Maulana	11	Octarianti Artha	"Bed of Roses"	Armand's choice
Episode 19 (Thursday, March 7, 2019)	Armand Maulana	12	Christiana Chindy	"Sebuah Rasa"	Eliminated
Episode 19 (Thursday, March 7, 2019)	Vidi & Nino	13	Agseisa Galuh	"A Million Dreams"	Public's vote
Episode 19 (Thursday, March 7, 2019)	Vidi & Nino	14	Philipus Joseph	"Januari"	Vidi & Nino's choice
Episode 19 (Thursday, March 7, 2019)	Vidi & Nino	15	Jaqlien Elsy	"Creep"	Eliminated
Episode 19 (Thursday, March 7, 2019)	Vidi & Nino	16	Faisal Kevin	"Jealous"	Eliminated

Non-competition performances
Order	Performer	Song
19.1	Team Anggun (Alisha Mikaila, King Daepanie, Rambu Piras, Rena Pradhita)	"Tua-tua Keladi"
19.2	Team Armand (Christiana Chindyi, Daniel Jonathan, Virzha Ikhtiarini, Octarianti Artha)	"Ya Ya Ya"
19.3	Team Vidi & Nino (Agseisa Galuh, Faisal Kevin, Jaqlien Elsy, Philipus Joseph)	"Pandangan Pertama" "Status Palsu"
19.4	Team Titi (Dodi Rozano, Hendra Jogi, Priscilla Evangelinna, Waode Andraini)	"Ekspresi"
19.5	Top 32 Group 1	"Ekspresi"

=== Week 2: Top 32, Group 2 (March 14) ===
Episode	Coach	Order	Artist	Song	Result
Episode 20 (Thursday, March 14, 2019)	Armand Maulana	1	Ramanda Almuna	"Arjuna"	Eliminated
Episode 20 (Thursday, March 14, 2019)	Armand Maulana	2	Anis Novinda	"Malam Biru"	Eliminated
Episode 20 (Thursday, March 14, 2019)	Armand Maulana	3	Ronaldo Longa	"Jealous"	Public's vote
Episode 20 (Thursday, March 14, 2019)	Armand Maulana	4	Anggi Marito	"Rise Up"	Armand's choice
Episode 20 (Thursday, March 14, 2019)	Anggun	5	Novia Bachmid	"Halo"	Eliminated
Episode 20 (Thursday, March 14, 2019)	Anggun	6	I Made Avapayatha	"Feeling Good"	Anggun's choice
Episode 20 (Thursday, March 14, 2019)	Anggun	7	Eunike Bella	"Nobody's Perfect"	Public's vote
Episode 20 (Thursday, March 14, 2019)	Anggun	8	Taufik Hidayat	"Fix You"	Eliminated
Episode 20 (Thursday, March 14, 2019)	Titi DJ	9	Anggraeiny Faradhita	"Bukan Dia Tapi Aku"	Eliminated
Episode 20 (Thursday, March 14, 2019)	Titi DJ	10	Keisha Andaviar	"Come Back Home"	Eliminated
Episode 20 (Thursday, March 14, 2019)	Titi DJ	11	Febrian Ihsan	"Sorry"	Public's vote
Episode 20 (Thursday, March 14, 2019)	Titi DJ	12	Gancar Asanegara	"Tentang Rindu"	Titi's choice
Episode 20 (Thursday, March 14, 2019)	Vidi & Nino	13	Shafira Putri	"Run to You"	Eliminated
Episode 20 (Thursday, March 14, 2019)	Vidi & Nino	14	Gok Parasian	"Andai Aku Bisa"	Vidi & Nino's choice
Episode 20 (Thursday, March 14, 2019)	Vidi & Nino	15	Richard Jeremy	"Isn't She Lovely"	Eliminated
Episode 20 (Thursday, March 14, 2019)	Vidi & Nino	16	Jasmine Risach	"Sementara"	Public's vote

Non-competition performances
Order	Performer	Song
20.1	Top 32 Group 2 Females (Anggi Marito, Anggraeiny Faradhita, Eunike Bella, Jasmine Risach, Keisha Andaviar, Novia Noval, Anis Novinda, Shafira Putri)	"Lelaki Buaya Darat"
20.2	Top 32 Group 2 Males (Febrian Ihsan, Gancar Asanegara, Gok Parasian, I Made Avapayatha, Ramanda Almuna, Richard Jeremy, Ronaldo Longa, Taufik Hidayat)	"Topeng"

=== Week 3: Semifinals, Top 16 (March 21) ===
Episode	Coach	Order	Artist	Song	Result
Episode 21 (Thursday, March 21, 2019)	Vidi & Nino	1	Agseisa Galuh	"Malaikat Juga Tahu"	Eliminated
Episode 21 (Thursday, March 21, 2019)	Vidi & Nino	2	Gok Parasian	"Terlalu Cinta"	Public's vote
Episode 21 (Thursday, March 21, 2019)	Vidi & Nino	3	Philipus Joseph	"Lay Me Down"	Vidi & Nino's choice
Episode 21 (Thursday, March 21, 2019)	Vidi & Nino	4	Jasmine Risach	"XO"	Eliminated
Episode 21 (Thursday, March 21, 2019)	Anggun	5	I Made Avapayatha	"Rumah Kita"	Anggun's choice
Episode 21 (Thursday, March 21, 2019)	Anggun	6	King Daepanie	"Lilin-lilin Kecil"	Eliminated
Episode 21 (Thursday, March 21, 2019)	Anggun	7	Rambu Piras	"Sweet Child o' Mine"	Public's vote
Episode 21 (Thursday, March 21, 2019)	Anggun	8	Eunike Bella	"Rolling in the Deep"	Eliminated
Episode 21 (Thursday, March 21, 2019)	Titi DJ	9	Waode Andraini	"Rembulan"	Public's vote
Episode 21 (Thursday, March 21, 2019)	Titi DJ	10	Febrian Ihsan	"Peri Cintaku"	Titi's choice
Episode 21 (Thursday, March 21, 2019)	Titi DJ	11	Hendra Jogi	"Sugar"	Eliminated
Episode 21 (Thursday, March 21, 2019)	Titi DJ	12	Gancar Asanegara	"Dealova"	Eliminated
Episode 21 (Thursday, March 21, 2019)	Armand Maulana	13	Ronaldo Longa	"Ekspektasi"	Public's vote
Episode 21 (Thursday, March 21, 2019)	Armand Maulana	14	Virzha Ikhtiarini	"Thank U, Next"	Armand's choice
Episode 21 (Thursday, March 21, 2019)	Armand Maulana	15	Anggi Marito	"Secret Love Song"	Eliminated
Episode 21 (Thursday, March 21, 2019)	Armand Maulana	16	Octarianti Artha	"Sadis"	Eliminated

Non-competition performances
Order	Performer	Song
21.1	Z-Girls	"What You Waiting For"
21.2	Z-Boys	"No Limit"

=== Week 4: Finals (March 28) ===
==== Top 8 ====
Episode	Coach	Order	Artist	Song	Result
Episode 22 (Thursday, March 28, 2019)	Vidi & Nino	1	Gok Parasian	"Pelangi"	Public's vote
Episode 22 (Thursday, March 28, 2019)	Vidi & Nino	2	Philipus Joseph	"Seperti Yang Kau Minta"	Eliminated
Episode 22 (Thursday, March 28, 2019)	Armand Maulana	3	Ronaldo Longa	"Takkan Terganti"	Public's vote
Episode 22 (Thursday, March 28, 2019)	Armand Maulana	4	Virzha Ikhtiarini	"Kekasih Sejati"	Public's vote
Episode 22 (Thursday, March 28, 2019)	Titi DJ	5	Waode Andraini	"Cinta Sejati"	Eliminated
Episode 22 (Thursday, March 28, 2019)	Titi DJ	6	Febrian Ihsan	"Tentang Seseorang"	Eliminated
Episode 22 (Thursday, March 28, 2019)	Anggun	7	Rambu Piras	"We Are the Champions"	Public's vote
Episode 22 (Thursday, March 28, 2019)	Anggun	8	I Made Avapayatha	"I Want to Break Free"	Eliminated

==== Top 4 ====
Episode	Coach	Order	Artist	Song	Result
Episode 22 (Thursday, March 28, 2019)	Vidi & Nino	1	Gok Parasian	"Karena Ku Sanggup"	Fourth Place
Episode 22 (Thursday, March 28, 2019)	Armand Maulana	2	Virzha Ikhtiarini	"Kasmaran"	Third Place
Episode 22 (Thursday, March 28, 2019)	Anggun	3	Rambu Piras	"One Moment in Time"	Runner-up
Episode 22 (Thursday, March 28, 2019)	Armand Maulana	4	Ronaldo Longa	"Terjebak Nostalgia"	Winner

Non-competition performances
Order	Performer	Song
22.1	Armand Maulana and his team (Virzha Ikhtiarini and Ronaldo Longa)	"Bawa Daku Pergi"
22.2	Titi DJ and her team (Febrian Ihsan and Waode Andraini)	"Dunia Boleh Tertawa"
22.3	Vidi & Nino and their team (Gok Parasian and Philipus Joseph)	"I Dont Mind" x "Pandangan Pertama"
22.4	Anggun and her team (I Made Avapayatha and Rambu Piras)	"We Will Rock You"
22.5	RAN	"Dekat di Hati"

== Elimination Charts ==
=== Overall ===
Color key
Artist's info

- Team Armand
- Team Anggun
- Team Vidi & Nino
- Team Titi

Result details

- Winner
- Runner-up
- Third place
- Fourth place
- Saved by the public
- Saved by his/her coach
- Eliminated

Live show results per week
Artists	Top 32	Top 16	Semi Finals	Finals
Ronaldo Longa	Safe	Safe	Safe	Winner
Rambu Piras	Safe	Safe	Safe	Runner-up
Virzha Ikhtiarini	Safe	Safe	Safe	3rd place
Gok Parasian	Safe	Safe	Safe	4th place
Febrian Ihsan	Safe	Safe	Eliminated	Eliminated (Semifinals, Top 8)
I Made Avapayatha	Safe	Safe	Eliminated	Eliminated (Semifinals, Top 8)
Philipus Joseph	Safe	Safe	Eliminated	Eliminated (Semifinals, Top 8)
Waode Andraini	Safe	Safe	Eliminated	Eliminated (Semifinals, Top 8)
Agseisa Galuh	Safe	Eliminated	Eliminated (Top 16)	
Anggi Marito	Safe	Eliminated	Eliminated (Top 16)	
Eunike Bella	Safe	Eliminated	Eliminated (Top 16)	
Gancar Asanegara	Safe	Eliminated	Eliminated (Top 16)	
Hendra Jogi	Safe	Eliminated	Eliminated (Top 16)	
Jasmine Risach	Safe	Eliminated	Eliminated (Top 16)	
King Daepanie	Safe	Eliminated	Eliminated (Top 16)	
Octarianti Artha	Safe	Eliminated	Eliminated (Top 16)	
Alisha Mikaila	Eliminated	Eliminated (Top 32)		
Anggraeiny Faradhita	Eliminated	Eliminated (Top 32)		
Anis Novinda	Eliminated	Eliminated (Top 32)		
Christiana Chindy	Eliminated	Eliminated (Top 32)		
Daniel Jonathan	Eliminated	Eliminated (Top 32)		
Dodi Rozano	Eliminated	Eliminated (Top 32)		
Faisal Kevin	Eliminated	Eliminated (Top 32)		
Jaqlien Elsy	Eliminated	Eliminated (Top 32)		
Keisha Andaviar	Eliminated	Eliminated (Top 32)		
Novia Bachmid	Eliminated	Eliminated (Top 32)		
Priscilla Evangelinna	Eliminated	Eliminated (Top 32)		
Ramanda Almuna	Eliminated	Eliminated (Top 32)		
Rena Pradhita	Eliminated	Eliminated (Top 32)		
Richard Jeremy	Eliminated	Eliminated (Top 32)		
Shafira Putri	Eliminated	Eliminated (Top 32)		
Taufik Hidayat	Eliminated	Eliminated (Top 32)		

=== Teams ===
Color key
Artist's info

- Team Armand
- Team Anggun
- Team Vidi & Nino
- Team Titi

Results details

- Winner
- Runner-up
- Third place
- Fourth place
- Eliminated

Live show results per week
Artists	Top 32	Top 16	Semi Finals	Finals
Ronaldo Longa	Public's vote	Public's vote	Advanced	Winner
Virzha Ikhtiarini	Public's vote	Coach's choice	Advanced	Third Place
Anggi Marito	Coach's choice	Eliminated		
Octarianti Artha	Coach's choice	Eliminated		
Anis Novinda	Eliminated			
Christiana Chindy	Eliminated			
Daniel Jonathan	Eliminated			
Ramanda Almuna	Eliminated			
Rambu Piras	Public's vote	Public's vote	Advanced	Runner-up
I Made Avapayatha	Coach's choice	Coach's choice	Eliminated	
Eunike Bella	Public's vote	Eliminated		
King Daepanie	Coach's choice	Eliminated		
Alisha Mikaila	Eliminated			
Novia Noval	Eliminated			
Rena Pradhita	Eliminated			
Taufik Hidayat	Eliminated			
Gok Parasian	Coach's choice	Public's vote	Advanced	Fourth place
Philipus Joseph	Coach's choice	Coach's choice	Eliminated	
Agseisa Galuh	Public's vote	Eliminated		
Jasmine Risach	Public's vote	Eliminated		
Faisal Kevin	Eliminated			
Jaqlien Elsy	Eliminated			
Richard Jeremy	Eliminated			
Shafira Putri	Eliminated			
Febrian Ihsan	Public's vote	Coach's choice	Eliminated	
Waode Andraini	Public's vote	Public's vote	Eliminated	
Gancar Asanegara	Coach's choice	Eliminated		
Hendra Jogi	Coach's choice	Eliminated		
Anggraeiny Faradhita	Eliminated			
Dodi Rozano	Eliminated			
Keisha Andaviar	Eliminated			
Priscilla Evangelinna	Eliminated			

== See also ==
- The Voice Indonesia
- The Voice Indonesia (season 1)
- The Voice Indonesia (season 2)
