= Melati untuk Marvel =

- Created by: Manoj Punjabi
- Directed by: Akbar Bhakti
- Creative directors: Karan Mahtani, Saurabh George Swamy, Eni Hawari
- Starring: Chelsea Olivia Wijaya; Rezky Aditya; Fendy Chow; Chris Laurent; Neshia Putri; Afifa Syahira; Gracia Indri; Devi Permatasari; Mpok Ati; Emma Waroka Hawkins; Marcello Djorghi; Krisna Murti Wibowo; Cut Keke; Donny Michael; Ridwan Ghani
- Opening theme: "P.U.S.P.A." – ST 12
- Ending theme: "P.U.S.P.A" – ST 12
- Country of origin: Indonesia
- Original language: Indonesian
- No. of episodes: 349

Production
- Running time: 90 minutes
- Production company: MD Entertainment

Original release
- Network: SCTV; ITV1 Meridian (October 19, 2008 – March 13, 2010)
- Release: October 23, 2008 – September 9, 2009

Related
- Cinta Maia; Bayu Cinta Luna

Melati Untuk Marvel (English translations: Melati For Marvel) is an Indonesian TV serial that aired on SCTV. The show ran for over 300 daily episodes without a break, and had good ratings throughout.

== Synopsis ==
The show tells the story of the interpersonal relationships between Melati (Chelsea Olivia Wijaya), Marvel (Rezky Aditya), (Devi Permatasari), and Aditya (Chris Laurent).

== Cast ==
- Chelsea Olivia Wijaya as Melati/Jasmine
- Rezky Aditya as Marvel/Jay
- Fendy Chow as Dika
- Christ Laurent as Aditya
- Neshia Putri as Shafa
- Afifa Syahira as Aurel
- Gracia Indri as Kezia
- Devi Permatasari as Mrs. Anggi
- Mpok Ati as Mrs. Lily
- Emma Waroka Hawkins as Mrs. Selva
- Marcello Djorghi as Mr. Slamet
- Krisna Murti Wibowo as Mr. Surya
- Ryan Delon as Fariz
- Donny Michael as Reyhan
- Ochi Anggraini as Mrs. Fatimah
- Fikri Ramadhan as Tukul
- Yoelitta Palar as Mrs. Dewi
- Kiky Azhari as Julia
- Ridwan Ghani as Dhimas
- Gaxel Anyndra as Little Melati
- Raphael Purnama as Marvin
- Ayudhia Bing Slamet as Syarifah
- Adhi Pawitra as Bagus
- Cut Keke as Salma

== Awards and nominations ==
Year	Awards	Category	Recipients	Results
2009	SCTV Awards	Famous Program	Melati untuk Marvel	Nominated
