= Buku Harian Nayla =

Indonesian Christmas television drama

- Written by: Serena Luna
- Starring: Chelsea Olivia; Glenn Alinskie
- Theme music composer: Jonathan Prawira
- Opening theme: "Seperti yang KAU ingini" performed by Nikita
- Ending theme: same as opening
- Composer: Astrid Lea
- Country of origin: Indonesia
- No. of episodes: 15

Production
- Running time: 30-40 minutes

Original release
- Network: RCTI
- Release: December 11 – December 25, 2006

Related
- 1 Litre of Tears (TV Series)

Buku Harian Nayla (Nayla's Diary) is an Indonesian Christmas television drama that aired on RCTI, written by Serena Luna. The show told the story of a girl diagnosed with ataxia when she was young. Due to overwhelming response from fans, re-runs were shown on RCTI at 4.30pm every Monday and Friday, with its running time shortened to 30 minutes including commercials due to lack of scheduling room. A second season, titled Buku Harian Nayla: 8 Tahun Kemudian (Nayla's Diary: 8 Years Later) was released on April 13, 2015.

== Synopsis ==
Nayla (Chelsea Olivia) is a bright, cheerful and hard-working student, the leader of her class and a talented basketball player, also very devoted to her religion. However, she is unknowingly afflicted with ataxia, which would eventually paralyze her. Her doctor, Dr Fritz, suggests that she write a diary so he can monitor her symptoms. After her diagnosis the doctor is initially reluctant to inform her of the grave nature of her condition, but does as her condition worsens.

The show follows her as she deals with the difficulties arising from her condition and her problems at school, and in her relationship with her classmates and her boyfriend Moses (Glenn Alinskie). As her classmates start to think about their future and their studies, she focuses on her writing, even when her condition becomes life-threatening. In the end her writing is depicted as having the ability to bring strength to those around her.

== Cast ==
- Chelsea Olivia Wijaya as Nayla
- Glenn Alinskie as Moses

== Criticism and controversy ==
The drama was accused of plagiarizing Japanese television drama 1 Litre of Tears. The name "Aya" was replaced with "Nayla", and the name "Asō" replaced by "Moses". Until now, there has still been no resolution nor any effort to enforce copyright law for this case.

The accusation that this series plagiarizes 1 Litre of Tears was accepted by the main actor, during an interview with Bintang Indonesia.

I don't want the viewers to compare me with the role on the real story. Especially when I am the main actor. Consequently, I will never want to watch the original. I'm afraid that I am being looked as imitating it. I want to be known as Chelsea. I don't care, let only the story plagiarizes, but the acting does not.

— Chelsea Olivia

The series itself did not include any note that the show was "inspired by" or "adapted from" another, instead claiming that the story was merely a fiction.
