= Gracia Indri =

Indonesian actress

- Born: Gracia Indri Sari Sulistyaningrum; January 14, 1990 (age 36); Pasuruan, East Java, Indonesia
- Occupations: Model, presenter, singer, comedian
- Years active: 1999–present
- Relatives: Gisela Cindy (sister)

Gracia Indri, born Gracia Indriyani Sari Sulistyaningrum (born January 14, 1990) is an Indonesian actress, singer, model, comedian and presenter. She is oldest sister of two siblings of Edo Sulistiarto and Nevos Setyaningrum. Her youngest sister, Gisela Cindy, is also a soap opera actress.

== Career ==
Gracia Indri began at 10 years of age in the soap opera Panji Manusia Millennium. Gracia Indri has starred in many soap operas and often get antagonistic, unsympathetic, sadistic, sinister, malicious, and villainous roles, such as in the soap operas Bidadari 2 (Angel 2) and Bidadari 3 (Angel 3). She has also appeared in Aku Bukan Cantik (I'm Not Beautiful), which was produced by FrameRitz and aired on Trans TV in 2007.

Gracia Indri has released several covers of old songs as singles, and intends to release a mini album.

== Personal life ==
On December 28, 2014, Gracia Indri married Noah' keyboardist, David Kurnia Albert, at Santo Petrus Cathedral Church, Bandung, West Java. Later, they divorced on May 3, 2018. She married again with Dutch politician Jeffrey Slijpen at November 20, 2021 and have a daughter named Nova Lynn Slijpen that was born at November 14, 2022.

== Filmography ==
=== Film ===
Year	Title	Role	Notes
2007	Malam Jumat Kliwon	Sheila	Lead role
2008	Coblos Cinta (Stabbing Love)	Icha	Supporting role
2010	Pasangan Romantis (The Romantic Match)		

=== Television ===
Year	Title	Role	Notes	Network
1999–2001	Anak Ajaib (Magical Child)	Nina	Supporting role	SCTV
1999	Tuyul dan Mbak Yul			RCTI
1999	Jin dan Jun			RCTI
1999–2001	Panji Manusia Millenium	Yayuk	Supporting role	RCTI
2001–2003	Indra Keenam (The Six Sense)		Supporting role	RCTI
2002–2003	Bidadari 2 (Angel 2)	Jessica	Supporting role	RCTI
2003	Bunga Diujung Matahari (Flowers at the Edge of the Sun)			
2004–2005	Bidadari 3 (Angel 3)	Jessica	Supporting role	RCTI
2003–2004	Jinny Lagi Jinny Lagi (Jinny Again, Jinny Again)		Supporting role	SCTV
2004–2005	Untung Ada Jinny (Luckily, There is Jinny)		Supporting role	ANTV
2005	Jalan Jaksa (The Way of Prosecutor)	Paula	Supporting role	Indosiar
2005–2006	Senyuman Amanda (The Smile of Amanda)	Alisa	Supporting role	Indosiar
2006	Turun Ranjang (Down the Bed)	Siska	Supporting role	Indosiar
2006	Indahnya Karunia-Mu (The Beauty of Your Gift)			Indosiar
2006	Penjaga Hati (The Heart Guardian)	Alya	Supporting role	SCTV
2007	Peri Sok Gaul			Indosiar
2007	Janji-Mu Seperti Fajar (Your Promises Like A Dawn)	Livi	Supporting role	RCTI
2007	Kakak Iparku 17 Tahun		Supporting role	RCTI
2007	Cinta Semanis Coklat (Love as Sweet as Chocolate)		Supporting role	Indosiar
2007	Bembi			RCTI
2007	Aku Bukan Cantik (I'm not Beautiful)			Trans TV
2007	Legenda (Legend)			Trans TV
2007	Romantika Remaja (The Teenage Romance)		Supporting role	SCTV
2008	Menanti Keajaiban Cinta (Waiting Miracle of Love)	Diva	Supporting role	RCTI
2008	Cinta Maia (Love of Maia)	Eva	Supporting role	SCTV
2008–2009	Melati untuk Marvel (Jasmine for Marvel)	Kezia	Supporting role	SCTV
2009	Cinta Ramadan dan Ramona (The Ramadan of Love and Ramona)			RCTI
2009	Cinta Slamet Yonata			
2009–2010	Kesetiaan Cinta	Winda Santika	Supporting role	SCTV
2010–2011	Rama dan Ramona (Rama and Ramona)			SCTV
2010–2011	Dia Anakku	Vina	Supporting role	Indosiar
2011	Kesucian Cinta (Sanctity Love)	Farahdiba	Supporting role	MNCTV
2012	Fathiyah	Karin/Layla	Supporting role	MNCTV
2012	Fathiyah Season 2	Maura	Supporting role	MNCTV
2013	Istri Yang Dikhianati (The Betrayed Wife)	Jessica	Supporting role	MNCTV
2013	Jenderal Kancil (General Kancil)		Supporting role	MNCTV
2014	Spot On	Herself		Global TV
2014	Pashmina Aisha	Gracia	Supporting role	RCTI
2014	Ganteng-Ganteng Serigala (The Handsome Wolves)			SCTV
2014	Tendangan Si Madun Returns	Yunita	Supporting role	MNCTV
2014	Hati Ke Hati Show (Heart to Heart Show)	Herself	Gameshow, guest star	Trans TV
2014	The Blusukan	Herself	Guest star	Trans TV
2015	ASAL (Asli Atau Palsu) (Fake or Real) (season 2)	Herself	Judges, her first season	Trans 7
2015	Perang Macan (Tiger Wars)	Herself	Host	Trans TV
2015	Ada Ada Aja	Herself	Host	Global TV
2015	Aksi Bocah Cilik (The Action of Little Boy)	Herself	Host	Global TV
2015	Obsesi (Obrolan Seputar Selebriti) (Regarding Chat Celebrity Obsession)	Herself	Host	Global TV
2015	Digoda Lagi (Tormented Again)	Herself	Variety show	Trans TV
2015	Biang Rumpi (No Secret)	Herself	Guest star	Trans TV
2016	Everybody Superstar	Herself	Host	Trans TV
2016	The Price Is Right Indonesia (season 3)	Herself	Host	RCTI
2017	Xtra Ordinary	Herself	Host	RCTI
2017	Republik Sosmed	Herself	Cast	Trans TV
2018	Jogedin Ajah	Herself	Host	RCTI
2018	Netijen	Herself	Host	Trans TV
2019	Breakout	Herself	Host	NET.
2019	Shadow Singer Indonesia	Herself	Judges	GTV
2019	Main Kata Indonesia	Herself	Host	GTV
2019	Family 100 Indonesia	Herself	Co-host	GTV
2019	The Voice Indonesia (season 4)	Herself	Host	GTV
2019	Gong Show Indonesia	Herself	Host	RCTI
2019	Buka-Bukaan	Herself	Host	GTV
2020	The Great Magician	Herself	Host	GTV
2020	Kuis Jari-Jari (season 3)	Herself	Host	RCTI
2020	E-Talkshow	Herself	Co-host	tvOne
2021	ASAL (Asli Atau Palsu) (Fake or Real) (season 3)	Herself	Judges, her second season	GTV

=== Film Television ===
Year	Title	Role	Notes
2007	Bohong Dikit Boleh Ngga?	Ocha	Lead role
2008	Finding Nino	Nadine	Supporting role
2009	Juminten Goes to Paris	Tuti	Lead role
2011	Buat Gue Jatuh Cinta	Mita	Supporting role

== Discography ==
=== Single ===
- "Gengsi Setengah Mati" (2013)
- "Patah Jadi Dua" (2013)
- "Tenda Biru" (2013)

== TV commercial ==
- Yupi
- C & A
- Kacang Garuda (Garuda Peanuts)
- Mikorex
- Caladine
- California Fried Chicken

== Awards and nominations ==
Year	Award	Category	Recipients	Results
2009	SCTV Awards	Famous Supporting Role Actress	Melati untuk Marvel (Jasmine for Marvel)	Nominated
2015	Infotainment Awards	Most Phenomenal Celebrity Wedding	Gracia Indri and David Noah	Nominated
2016	Infotainment Awards	Most Phenomenal Celebrity Wedding	Gracia Indri and David Noah	Nominated
