= 1 Litre no Namida =

2005 Japanese television drama

- Also known as: 1 Liter of Tears
- Genre: Romance; Tragedy; Family
- Starring: Erika Sawajiri; Ryō Nishikido; Hiroko Yakushimaru; Takanori Jinnai
- Ending theme: "Only Human" (K)
- Country of origin: Japan
- Original language: Japanese
- No. of episodes: 11 (list of episodes)

Production
- Producer: Satoko Kashikawa
- Production companies: Fuji Television; Kyodo Television

Original release
- Network: FNS (Fuji TV)
- Release: October 11 – December 20, 2005

Related
- Buku Harian Nayla

1 Litre no Namida (1リットルの涙; lit. "1 Litre of Tears"; also called A Diary with Tears or A Diary of Tears) is a 2005 Japanese television drama series broadcast by Fuji TV. The story based on the story of Aya Kitō, who suffered from a degenerative disease and died at the age of 25. Directed by Riki Okamura, it stars Erika Sawajiri, Ryō Nishikido, Hiroko Yakushimaru and Takanori Jinnai.

The script is based on Aya's diary that she kept writing in until she could no longer hold a pen. The diary was later titled One Litre of Tears and sold over 1.1 million copies in Japan.

A new film is scheduled for 2027, with Nishikido reprising his role.

== Plot ==
Fifteen-year-old Aya Ikeuchi is an ordinary girl, soon to be high school student and the eldest daughter of a family who works at a tofu shop. As time passes, unusual things start happening to Aya. She begins falling down often and walking strangely. Concerned about her health, Aya's mother Shioka takes her to a doctor; he informs Shioka that Aya has spinocerebellar degeneration, a rare disease where the cerebellum gradually deteriorates to the point where the victim cannot walk, speak, write, or eat. As cruel as the disease is, it does not affect the mind.

== Episodes ==
#	Title	Original release date
1	"The Beginning of my Youth" "Aru seishun no hajimari" (Japanese: ある青春の始まり)	October 11, 2005
2	"15 Years Old, Sickness that Steals Up" "15-sai, shinobi yoru byōki" (Japanese: 15才、忍びよる病魔)	October 18, 2005
3	"Why Did the Illness Choose Me?" "Byōki wa dōshite watashi o eranda no?" (Japanese: 病気はどうして私を選んだの)	October 25, 2005
4	"The Loneliness of Two" "Futari no kodoku" (Japanese: 二人の孤独)	November 1, 2005
5	"A Disabled Person's Notebook" "Shōgaija techō" (Japanese: 障害者手帳)	November 8, 2005
6	"Heartless Glances" "Kokoronai shisen" (Japanese: 心ない視線)	November 15, 2005
7	"The Place Where I Am" "Watashi no iru basho" (Japanese: 私のいる場所)	November 22, 2005
8	"1 Litre of Tears" "1 rittoru no namida" (Japanese: 1リットルの涙)	November 29, 2005
9	"I Live Now" "Ima o ikiru" (Japanese: 今を生きる)	December 6, 2005
10	"Love Letter" "Raburetā" (Japanese: ラブレター)	December 13, 2005
11	"Far Away, to the Place Where Tears are Exhausted" "Tōku e, namida no tsukita basho ni" (Japanese: 遠くへ、涙の尽きた場所に)	December 20, 2005
Special	"Special Drama of 1 Litre of Tears: Memory" "「1 rittoru no namida」 tokubetsuhen tsuioku" (Japanese: 「1リットルの涙」特別篇‧追憶)	April 7, 2007

=== Special episode ===
On April 5, 2007, Fuji Television aired a three-hour special of the series set half a year (2014–2015) after Aya's death, and focuses on Haruto Asō, who has now become a doctor at the same hospital Aya was treated in, and Ako Ikeuchi, Aya's younger sister who is now a nurse in training, while Rika, Aya's youngest sister, has just started high school. Haruto is caring for a 14-year-old female patient, Mizuki, who was bullied in school because of her spinocerebellar degeneration, and rejects therapy due to having lost her will to live. Haruto remembers how Aya fought her illness and lived her life with her disease, and is thus motivated to support Mizuki reappears in the episode using a number of flashbacks from the series and in new scenes.

=== Stage Adaptation ===
A stage adaptation loosely based on Aya Kito's diary and the drama was held at Theatre 1010 from March 4, 2026 to March 8, 2026. This story featured Nogizaka46 member Riria Ito as the titular character Aya Takashima who joins a dance club at Wakaba Minami High School. The fictional café Taiyō served as a central area for the community members in the adaptation to interact with each other as well as Aya. Other characters included Takeru Funaki who played Ryonosuke Shina and Rie Shibata who played Kyoko Takashima.

=== 2027 film ===
A new movie is scheduled to be screened in February 26, 2027. Ryo Nishikido reprises his role from the 2005 series. The film, based on the books "1 Litre of Tears: The Diary of Aya, a Girl Fighting a Serious Illness" by Aya Kitō, and "Hurdles of life – "1 Litre of Tears," Notes from Mother" by her mother, Shioka Kitō, continues the story of the series. The film will also feature actress Rui Tsukishima and actor Hidekazu Chinen who will play the roles of Aya Ikeuchi and Haruto Asou respectively in flashback scenes. The film will also feature songs from that originated from the drama "Konayuki" (粉雪; Powdered Snow) and "Sangatsu Kokonoka" (3月9日; 9 March) by Remioromen.

== Casts ==
=== Main cast ===
- Erika Sawajiri - Aya Ikeuchi
- Ryo Nishikido - Haruto Asou

=== Other cast ===
- Naohito Fujiki - Hiroshi Mizuno (a doctor)
- Hiroko Yakushimaru - Ikeuchi Shioka
- Takanori Jinnai - Ikeuchi Mizuo
- Riko Narumi - Ikeuchi Ako
- Yuma Sanada - Ikeuchi Hiroki
- Ai Miyoshi, Yuuki Miyoshi - Ikeuchi Rika (the latter played an older Rika in the last two episodes)
- Sarasa Morimoto - Ikeuchi Rika in the special episode, in first year of high school.
- Saori Koide - Mari Sugiura (One of Aya's best friends)
- Kenichi Matsuyama - Yuji Kawamoto (Aya's first love interest and the basketball club leader, who drifts apart from her when she falls ill)
- Yuya Endo - Takeda Makoto (Yuji's friend in the basketball club)
- Kana Matsumoto - Saki Matsumura
- Momosuke Mizutani - Kohei Onda
- Ryo Hashidume - Keita Nakahara
- Hiroshi Katsuno - Yoshifumi Asōu (Haruto's father)
- Asae Onishi - Asumi Oikawa (Aya's roommate when she was in disability school, who has the same disease as Aya)
- Kazuko Katō - Kikue Oikawa (Asumi's mother)
- Yuuki Sato - Keisuke Asōu (Haruto's brother)
- Maya Hamaoka - Madoka Fujimura
- Toshihide Tonesaku - Kiichi Takano (One of the volunteers at the disability school, who later marries the head teacher there)
- Shigeyuki Satō - Nishino (Aya's homeroom teacher at the normal high school)
- Aoi - Tomita (a high school student who likes Haruto & is jealous of Aya)
- Anri Okamoto - Nagashima Mizuki (a 14-year-old, and the protagonist in special episodes).

== Alternate versions ==
Indonesian Production House SinemArt's drama, titled Buku Harian Nayla (Nayla's Diary). This series aired on RCTI as a special Christmas series in 2006. The scenario was written by Serena Luna, aka Chevyra Edenia.

Amrita TV is to dub 1 Litre no Namida, and the Chinese drama Tears of Happiness is based on this drama.

A Turkish remake of this drama, titled Bir Litre Gözyaşı, aired on Kanal D in 2018.

== Ratings ==
Episode	Kanto	Kansai	Nationwide
01	13.5	15.6	12.7
02	15.1	??.?	??.?
03	13.5	??.?	??.?
04	12.3	??.?	??.?
05	14.6	??.?	??.?
06	15.2	??.?	??.?
07	16.2	??.?	??.?
08	15.4	??.?	??.?
09	15.5	??.?	??.?
10	16.6	??.?	??.?
11	20.5	??.?	??.?
average	15.31	??.?	??.?

Source: Video Research, Ltd.

== Broadcasts ==
=== Japan ===
- Original run: October 11, 2005 – December 20, 2005
- Network and Timeslot: Fuji TV, Tuesdays at 10:00-11:00 pm
- Theme songs: "Only Human" by K, and "Konayuki" (粉雪; Powdered Snow) and "Sangatsu Kokonoka" (3月9日; 9 March) by Remioromen
- OST by Susumu Ueda

=== Hong Kong ===
- Original run: October 15, 2006 – December 31, 2006
- Network and Timeslot: TVB Jade, Sundays at 10:30-11:30 pm
- Theme song(s): "Stubborn" (固執) by Jason Chan (TV), Xiang Ai Bu Xiang Ai (想愛不相愛) by Ivana Wong (Movie)

=== Singapore ===
- Original run: Nov 28, 2006 – Jan 2, 2007
- Channel and time slot: E-City, Mondays and Tuesdays, 11:00 pm – 12:00 am
- Theme songs: "Only Human" by K, and "Konayuki" (粉雪; Powdered Snow) and "Sangatsu Kokonoka" (3月9日; 9 March) by Remioromen

=== Indonesia ===
- Original run: May 4, 2007 – May 18, 2007
- Network and Timeslot: Indosiar, Mondays to Fridays at 05:00-06:00 pm
- Theme songs: "Only Human" by K, and "Konayuki" (粉雪; Powdered Snow) and "Sangatsu Kokonoka" (3月9日; 9 March) by Remioromen

=== Taiwan ===
- Original run: July 2, 2007 – July 18, 2007
- Network and Timeslot: Japan Entertainment Television, Mondays to Thursdays at 10:00-11:00 pm
- Theme songs: "Only Human" by K, and "Konayuki" (粉雪; Powdered Snow) and "Sangatsu Kokonoka" (3月9日; 9 March) by Remioromen

=== Malaysia ===
- Original run: August 4, 2007 – October 20, 2007
- Channel and time slot: 8TV, Saturdays, 06:00 pm – 07:00 pm
- Theme songs: "Only Human" by K, and "Konayuki" (粉雪; Powdered Snow) and "Sangatsu Kokonoka" (3月9日; 9 March) by Remioromen

=== Thailand ===
- Original run: May 5, 2008 - June 9, 2008
- Channel and time slot: Thai Public Broadcasting Service, Mondays & Tuesdays, 08:30 pm – 09:30 pm
- Theme songs: "Only Human" by K, and "Konayuki" (粉雪; Powdered Snow) and "Sangatsu Kokonoka" (3月9日; 9 March) by Remioromen

=== Philippines ===
- Original run: May 25, 2009 – June 19, 2009
- Channel and time slot: GMA Network, Weekdays, 10:15 pm – 10:45 pm
- Theme songs: "Walang Hanggan" by Wency Cornejo feat. Cookie Chua, "Only Human" by K, and "Konayuki" (粉雪; Powdered Snow) and "Sangatsu Kokonoka" (3月9日; 9 March) by Remioromen

=== Vietnam ===
- Original run: September 3, 2012
- Channel and time slot: HTV3, Mondays to Thursday, 21h30 - 22h30 GMT+7
- Theme songs: "Only Human" by K, and "Konayuki" (粉雪; Powdered Snow) and "Sangatsu Kokonoka" (3月9日; 9 March) by Remioromen
- OST by Susumu Ueda

== Soundtrack ==
No.	Title	Music	Length
1.	"littoru no namida -Main Theme-"	Susumu Ueda
2.	"hurdle wo koete"	Susumu Ueda
3.	"anata ga oshiete kure tamono -ai no Theme-"	Susumu Ueda
4.	"yasashisa ni tsumarete"	Susumu Ueda
5.	"anji"	Susumu Ueda
6.	"kimi e no Long Pass"	Susumu Ueda
7.	"rakujitsu"	Susumu Ueda
8.	"shinobiyoru byouma"	Susumu Ueda
9.	"furi aoge ba aoi sora"	Susumu Ueda
10.	"namida no imi"	Susumu Ueda
11.	"senkoku"	Susumu Ueda
12.	"mou utae nai"	Susumu Ueda
13.	"te wo nobase ba anata ga"	Susumu Ueda
14.	"kunou no senritsu"	Susumu Ueda
15.	"nagare yuku jikan"	Susumu Ueda
16.	"sagashi te goran"	Susumu Ueda
17.	"nigiyaka na danran"	Susumu Ueda
18.	"toumei na sekai"	Susumu Ueda
19.	"seimei aru kagiri -Sub Theme-"	Susumu Ueda
20.	"Only Human (Piano Version)"	K
21.	"Konayuki (Piano Version)"	Remioromen
22.	"Only Human (Cello Version)"	K
23.	"Only Human"	K
24.	"Konayuki"	Remioromen
25.	"sangatsu kokonoka"	Remioromen
