= Senandung =

- Genre: Musical
- Screenplay by: Alex Soeprapto Yudho
- Directed by: Bobby Sandy
- Starring: Devi Permatasari; El Manik
- Theme music composer: Billy J. Budiarjo
- Opening theme: "Senandung" (Note: Performed by Binu Sukaman and Johnson Hutagalung)
- Composers: Billy J. Budiarjo; Dian HP
- Country of origin: Indonesia
- Original language: Indonesian
- No. of episodes: 43

Production
- Cinematography: Berti RPM
- Camera setup: Multi-camera
- Production company: Indosiar Productions

Original release
- Network: Indosiar
- Release: 19 August 2000

Senandung (English: "Humming") is a 2000 Indonesian musical television series produced by and aired on Indosiar. Directed by Bobby Sandy, the series stars Devi Permatasari and El Manik in their lead roles.

== Premise ==
The story of successful husband-and-wife team Hermawan Soedarsono and Yusnita. Yusnita founded the company that has gone international, while Hermawan, an operatic star turned vocal coach, felt worse with his idealism as a sole artist.

== Cast ==
- Devi Permatasari as Rosilawati
  - Binu Sukaman provided Rosilawati's operatic voice; while Sophie Jasmin provided more poppy singing voice.
- El Manik as Hermawan Sudarsono, a vocal coach.
  - Johnson Hutagalung provided Hermawan's singing voice.
- Okky Asokawati as Yusnita

== Production ==
Production of Senandung began in 1997, when Suharto was still in power. That same year, Kirey was announced as the cast of the series. Principal photography was done at Bali, Yogyakarta, and Paris, France.

=== Music ===
Billy J. Budiarjo wrote 10 operatic songs for the series, with four of them are classified as "heavy" while the others are more pop. He originally composed the series' score, but following his death, Dian HP took over Budiarjo's scoring duties.

== Reception ==
Writing for Tempo, Devi's role as Rosilawati described as "possesive towards the collaborating singer".
