= Glenn Alinskie =

Indonesian actor

- Born: 19 October 1988 (age 37); Jakarta, Indonesia
- Occupation: Actor
- Years active: 2005 - 2017
- Spouse: Chelsea Olivia

Glenn Alinskie (born 19 October 1988), is an Indonesian actor. He is known for his numerous roles in soap operas.

== Biography ==
Glenn Alinskie was born in Jakarta on 19 October 1988 and is of Thai-Chinese-Indonesian ancestry. He is a Roman Catholic. Alinskie portrayed the main cast role of Ello in the sinetron (Indonesian soap opera) Intan, as well as its Korean drama adaptation, and the male lead role of Moses in Buku Harian Nayla with Chelsea Olivia. He married Chelsea Olivia on 3 October 2015, and they welcomed their first child, a daughter, on September 9, 2016.

== Soap Opera ==
Year	Title	Role	Production
2006	Intan	Ello	Sinemart
2006	Pangeran Penggoda	Alan	Sinemart
2006	Buku Harian Nayla	Moses	Sinemart
2006	Pengantin Remaja		Sinemart
2007	Baby Doll	Frey	Sinemart
2007	Nona Dewa		
2007	Maha Cinta		Sinemart
2007	Selamat Jalan Natasya		
2007	Kakak Iparku 17 Tahun	Nara	Sinemart
2007	Cahaya	Raka	Sinemart
2008	Menanti Keajaiban Cinta	Vano	Sinemart
2008	Rindu		
2008	Upik Abu dan Laura	Gatot/Glenn	Sinemart
2008	Kawin Massal	Rio	Sinemart
2009	Air Mata Cinta	Rafka	Sinemart
2009	Doa dan Karunia	Glenn	Sinemart
2010	Dia Bukan Anakku	Miko	Sinemart
2010	Putri Yang Ditukar	Arman	Sinemart
2012	Asmara dan Cinta	Januari	Sinemart
2013	Surat Kecil Untuk Tuhan The Series	Ruby	Sinemart
2014	Kau Yang Berasal Dari Bintang	Arka	Sinemart
2015	Buku Harian Nayla: 8 Tahun Kemudian	Moses	Sinemart
2016	Rahasia Cinta	Rangga	Mega Kreasi Films
2017	Cahaya Cinta	Yoga	Tripar Multivision Plus
2017	Cahaya Cinta 2	Yoga	Tripar Multivision Plus
