= Chelsea Olivia =

Indonesian actress and singer

- Born: Chelsea Olivia Wijaya; 29 July 1992 (age 34); Bandar Lampung, Lampung, Indonesia
- Other names: Gabrielle Chelsea Olivia Wijaya; (Catholic confirmation name)
- Occupations: Actress; singer
- Years active: 1997–present
- Musical career
- Genres: Pop; dance-pop; RandB
- Instrument: Vocals
- Labels: Aquarius Musikindo; Arka Music Indonesia

Chelsea Olivia Wijaya (born 29 July 1992), better known by her stage name Chelsea Olivia, is an Indonesian actress and pop singer. Olivia is the youngest of three children. She is also a former grader of acceleration in one of the leading high schools in South Jakarta. Olivia graduated from high school at the age of 15 years.

== Career ==
=== Early soap opera career ===
In her first foray in the world of modeling, Olivia made an album for her children. Once incorporated into Indika Entertainment she got a soap opera. But before this, she was starring in the soap opera Tuyul dan Mbak Yul in 2000 as guest star in episode 84. She became publicly known since starring in the soap opera Cincin, after the offer to play soap operas and advertisements come to her. Her name is increasingly discussed after starring in Buku Harian Nayla. Olivia studies at Tarakanita Primary School, St. Louis 1 Junior High, and Jakarta 6 High.

=== Dabbled in movies and music ===
In addition to playing the soap opera, Olivia, as a Christian (born and raised in the Protestant faith but converted to Catholicism), is busy singing with BBB (Bukan Bintang Biasa), a group made up of younger soap opera stars such as: Laudya Cynthia Bella, Raffi Ahmad, Dimas Beck and Ayushita under the guidance of singer and songwriter Melly Goeslaw. The BBB group also produced the soundtrack of the movie entitled Bukan Bintang Biasa.

== Personal life ==
The soap opera Buku Harian Nayla brings Glenn Alinskie, a new artist, to now become her lover. Glenn is reported to have officially dated Chelsea one day before her 15th birthday on 28 July 2007. Chelsea married Glenn on 3 October 2015, followed by their sensational honeymoon in a luxury resort in Bali, Samabe Bali Suites and Villas. They welcomed their first child, a daughter, on 9 September 2016.

Chelsea is a convert to Roman Catholicism from Protestantism.

== Discography ==
=== Soundtrack album ===
- Ost. Bukan Bintang Biasa (2007)
- Ost. Antara Cinta dan Dusta (2011)

=== Single ===
Year	Title	Album	Label
2007	"Bukan Bintang Biasa" (with BBB)	Ost. Bukan Bintang Biasa	Aquarius Musikindo
2007	"Ku Cinta Apa Adanya Kamu"	Ost. Bukan Bintang Biasa	Aquarius Musikindo
2007	"Let's Dance Together" (with BBB and Melly Goeslaw)	Mindnsoul	Aquarius Musikindo
2007	"Karena Cinta" (with BBB)		Aquarius Musikindo
2008	"Putus Nyambung" (with BBB)	Non-album single	Aquarius Musikindo
2010	"Kuingin Menikah" (with BBB Girls)	Ost. Kabayan Jadi Milyuner	Aquarius Musikindo
2011	"Antara Cinta dan Dusta" (feat. Evan Sanders)	Ost. Antara Cinta dan Dusta	Arka Music Indonesia
2012	"CH2 (Cinta Hati Hati)" (with BBB and Melly Goeslaw)	Balance	Aquarius Musikindo

== Filmography ==
=== Films ===
Year	Title	Role	Notes
2007	Bukan Bintang Biasa	Chelsea	Lead role
2008	Summer Breeze	Reina	Lead role
2009	Suka Ma Suka	Chelsea	Cameo
2014	Petualangan Singa Pemberani Dinoterra	Liona	Lead role

=== Television ===
Year	Title	Role	Notes	Network
2000	Tuyul dan Mbak Yul	Fira (Episode 84)	Guest star	RCTI
2003	Setetes Embun		Supporting role	RCTI
2003	Bayangan Adinda	Ima	Supporting role	SCTV
2004	Matahariku	Tina	Supporting role	SCTV
2005	Tuhan Ada Dimana-mana	Midah	Lead role	RCTI
2005–2006	Kodrat		Lead role	SCTV
2006	Cincin	Sasta	Lead role	RCTI
2006	Penyihir Cinta	Kezia	Lead role	SCTV
2006	Pangeran Penggoda	Bulan	Lead role	RCTI
2006	Buku Harian Nayla	Nayla (Episode 1 -15)	Lead role	RCTI
2007	Maha Cinta			RCTI
2007	Cewek Penakluk		Supporting role	SCTV
2007	Loni Cantik Maukah Kamu Jadi Pacarku	Loni	Lead role	SCTV
2007	Mawar	Mawar	Lead role	RCTI
2008	Menanti Keajaiban Cinta	Nadia	Lead role	RCTI
2008	Chelsea	Chelsea	Lead role	SCTV
2008	Cucu Menantu	Bulan	Supporting role	SCTV
2008–2010	Melati untuk Marvel	Melati/Jasmin	Lead role	SCTV
2010	Mawar Melati	Melati	Lead role	SCTV
2010	Cinta Melody	Melody	Lead role	Indosiar
2011	Antara Cinta dan Dusta	Atikah	Lead role	Indosiar
2011–2012	Cinta Sejati	Siti Saffanah	Lead role	MNCTV
2012	Segalanya Cinta	Salsa	Lead role	MNCTV
2012–2013	Raja dan Aku	Chelsea/Putri Kartini	Lead role	Global TV
2013	Cinta Itu Anugrah	Cinta	Lead role	MNCTV
2014	Jangan Mau-Mau	Bulan	Lead role	SCTV
2015	Buku Harian Nayla: 8 Tahun Kemudian	Gabby (Episode 1–7)	Lead role	RCTI
2019	Rindu tanpa Cinta	lead role	RCTI	

== Advertisement ==
- Indomie
- Vaseline
- Gary Wafer Coklat
- Melatizer
- KFC
- Ando
- Washington Apel
- Kalpanax
- AW
- Vipro G
- Decolith Paint
- Inaco Jelly
- Toyota Kijang Innova
- Anda Apel
- XL
- PLN
- Indovision
- Yamaha Mio
- Sharp Samurai
- Batavia Air
- Hyundai i10
- Kia Picanto
- Real Good
- Daihatsu Sirion
- Toshiba Glacio
- Bontea Green
- Simas Mobil
- Panadol Cold and Flu
- Redoxon Double Action
- Mie Sedaap
- Fanbo
- Mitsubishi Maven
- Smart Fortwo
- Chevrolet Spark
- Motorola
- Emeron
- Top White Coffee
- Komix

== Awards and nominations ==
Year	Award	Category	Recipients	Results
2007	KapanLagi.com	Most Popular Indonesian Celebrity	Chelsea Olivia	Won
2007	KapanLagi.com	Potential Newcomer Celebrity	Chelsea Olivia	Won
2007	Bali International Film Festival	Best Soundtrack	Bukan Bintang Biasa	Won
2007	Panasonic Awards	Favorite Actress	Buku Harian Nayla	Nominated
2008	Anugerah Musik Indonesia	Best Dance/Electronic Production Work	"Let's Dance Together" (with BBB and Melly Goeslaw)	Won
2008	SCTV Awards	Famous Actress	Chelsea Olivia	Nominated
2008	Indonesia Blogvoters Choice Awards	Favorite Soap Opera Actress	Chelsea Olivia	Won
2009	Panasonic Awards	Favorite Actress	Melati untuk Marvel	Nominated
2009	Dahsyatnya Awards	Outstanding Duo/Group Singer	BBB	Nominated
2009	SCTV Awards	Famous Actress	Chelsea Olivia	Nominated
2010	SCTV Awards	Famous Actress	Chelsea Olivia	Nominated
2011	Nickelodeon Indonesia Kids' Choice Awards	Favorite Actress	Chelsea Olivia	Nominated
2011	Bintang Magazine	10 Most Shining Star	Chelsea Olivia	Won
2011	Bintang RPTI Awards	Favorite Actress	Chelsea Olivia	Nominated
2012	Bintang Magazine	Best Soap Opera Actor/Actress	Chelsea Olivia	Won
2015	Dahsyatnya Awards	Outstanding Couple	Chelsea Olivia and Glenn Alinskie	Nominated
2015	Insert Awards	Best VIP Hottest Couple	Chelsea Olivia and Glenn Alinskie	Won
2015	Insert Awards	Best VIP Dress	Chelsea Olivia	Nominated
2015	Silet Awards	Razored Romance	Chelsea Olivia and Glenn Alinskie	Nominated
2016	Infotainment Awards	Most Phenomenal Celebrity Wedding	Chelsea Olivia and Glenn Alinskie	Won
2016	Infotainment Awards	Most Romantic Celebrity Couple	Chelsea Olivia and Glenn Alinskie	Won
2016	Insert Fashion Awards	Favorite Celebrity Couple	Chelsea Olivia and Glenn Alinskie	Won
2016	Nickelodeon Indonesia Kids' Choice Awards	Favorite Television Couple	Chelsea Olivia and Glenn Alinskie	Nominated
2016	Selebrita Awards	Most Celeb Couple	Chelsea Olivia and Glenn Alinskie	Won
2016	Mom and Kids Awards	Favorite Mommy	Chelsea Olivia	Nominated
2017	Infotainment Awards	Gorgeous Mom	Chelsea Olivia	Won
2017	Infotainment Awards	Most Romantic Couple Celebrity	Chelsea Olivia and Glenn Alinskie	Nominated
2017	Selebrita Awards	Most Celeb Couple	Chelsea Olivia and Glenn Alinskie	Nominated
