= Devi Permatasari =

Indonesian actress, presenter, and model (born 1974)

- Born: 11 June 1974 (age 52); Jakarta, Indonesia
- Occupations: Actress; Model; Politician
- Years active: 1991 - present
- Notable work: Saras 008
- Spouse: Chandra Priatna (m. 1998)
- Children: 1

Devi Permatasari (born 11 June 1974) is an Indonesian actress, presenter, and model. She has appeared in the soap operas Anak-Anak Manusia with Teddy Syach, Primus Yustisio, and Jihan Fahira.

== Career ==
Prior to entering the entertainment industry in 1991, Permatasari began her career as a model. She made her acting debut in the film Babad Tanah Leluhur. Four years later, in 1995, Permatasari made her television series debut with Singgasana Brama Kumbara.

Apart from her acting career, Permatasari is active in the politics, being a member of National Mandate Party. She is married and has one daughter, born on 5 February 2003.

== Partial filmography ==
- Senandung
