= Vidi Aldiano =

Indonesian singer-songwriter (1990–2026)

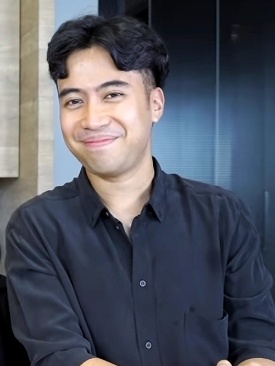
- Aldiano in 2020

Background information
- Also known as: Vidi Aldiano
- Born: Oxavia Aldiano; 29 March 1990; Jakarta, Indonesia
- Died: 7 March 2026 (aged 35) Jakarta, Indonesia
- Genres: Pop; R&B; soul
- Occupations: Singer; songwriter; actor; musician; MC; podcast host
- Years active: 2005–2026
- Label: Suara Hati/Depic Production (2008–2010); Trinity Optima Production (2010–2014); Sony Music Indonesia (2014‍–‍2015); VA Records (2015–2026)
- Spouse: Sheila Dara Aisha (m. 2022–2026)

Oxavia "Vidi" Aldiano (29 March 1990 – 7 March 2026), was an Indonesian singer-songwriter. He started his musical career in 2008 with his debut album Pelangi di Malam Hari. "Nuansa Bening" and "Status Palsu" from the album became hits and brought his name to fame.

In 2009, early in his career, he received his first award of Most Favorite Male Artist during the 2009 MTV Indonesia Awards.

Persona (2016) was certified triple platinum, his first, after selling 250,000 physical copies in 5 months.

== Early life and education ==
Oxavia Aldiano was born in Jakarta, Indonesia on 29 March 1990. His Javanese father, Harry Aprianto Kissowo, was the owner of an event organiser business. His Minangkabau mother, Besbarini, was a piano teacher. On his father's side, Aldiano was the grandson of S. Darsih Kissowo.

His last name Aldiano is an acronym of "Alhamdulillah Dia Nongol" (lit. 'Thank God He Pops Out'). When his mother gave birth to him, Aldiano and his mother were almost helpless because she suffered from an illness. When Aldiano was born, his father was grateful and said the phrase. Oxavia means "balance". Meanwhile, Vidi was an abbreviation of his name. He had two younger siblings, Diva Stradivaryan and Vadi Akbar, who are also singers.

Vidi was raised in a family highly appreciative of music. When little, he often listened to ad jingles on TV, humming to the tunes, and he liked the sound of adzan. His parents signed him up for a singing competition. He earned third place in a kindergarten singing competition when he was two and a half years old. When he was 3, he learned the piano under the tutelage of his mother, then learned the violin when he was in elementary school. He started singing when he was in middle school. When little, he was shy and a bookworm. It caused him to not have many friends in his childhood. During recess, he preferred to spend his time studying at the library.

Aldiano received his elementary and high school education at the Al-Azhar Foundation: SDI Al Azhar 4, Kebayoran Lama (1996–2002); SMPI Al Azhar 3, Bintaro (2002–2005); and SMAI Al Azhar 1, Kebayoran Baru (2005–2008). He formed a duo with Raisa during high school, but their activities did not last long due to a greater transportation cost than money earned. Upon graduation from high school, Aldiano majored in Electrical Engineering at Pelita Harapan University, but he felt not suited to the materials and switched to Management after a few months. Entering college, he adjusted his busy singing career with his studies by buying books. He carried books everywhere, even when in the studio. Aldiano participated in the Summer Program at Berklee College of Music for two months from July to August 2012, studying vocal techniques, theory, musicalisation, and music history. Returning to Indonesia, he entered his seventh and last semester of college. Aldiano completed his studies in mid-2013 with a GPA of 3.62. He then continued his postgraduate studies at the University of Manchester studying Innovation Management and Entrepreneurship starting November 2013. He finished his thesis as graduation requirements in September 2014 after working on it for 3 months with research done in Indonesia. He graduated cum laude in 2015.

== Career ==
=== 2000s ===
In 2006, on a whim while truanting, Aldiano participated in the third season of Indonesian Idol at the Jakarta International Expo, singing Glenn Fredly's "Pada Satu Cinta", and made it to the top 100.

He recorded his first album in grade 10 to replace the songs played at his school canteen. He disliked and was bored with the songs so he intended to record an album himself to be played there. He recorded and produced his songs independently. The album was finished after 3 years, shortly after he graduated. Then, he sent the demo album to record labels, but was rejected 6 times, as male soloists were not trending then. In 2008, music producer Lala Hamid produced Aldiano's debut album Pelangi di Malam Hari. The first single "Nuansa Bening" from the album was a hit in TVs and radios. The second single "Status Palsu" was also a hit.

For Ramadan 2009 (August–September 2009), Aldiano with Vadi Akbar released the compilation religious album Lelaki Pilihan. In the album, he sang "Rindu Rasul" with Sam Bimbo, "Ibunda Kita (Surga Kita)", and "Keagungan Tuhan".

Aldiano received his first award of Most Favorite Male Artist during the 2009 MTV Indonesia Awards.

=== 2010s ===
His second album Yang Kedua was initially slated for 14 February 2011, but delayed to 27 July. This album was released under Trinity Optima. The album consisted of 11 singles, 6 of them written by Aldiano, with 3 hit singles "Datang dan Kembali", "Lupakan Mantan", and "Gadis Genit". He was involved in 95% of the production, starting from lyrics, music production, to album cover design.

In 2013, Aldiano released a mini album entitled Dunia Baru with hit singles "Pupus/Kasih Tak Sampai (mash up)", "Apakah Ku Jatuh Cinta" (feat. Sherina Munaf), "Dibawah Langit Ibu Kota", the latter of which was produced by his friend Petra Sihombing. After the release, he went to the University of Manchester to continue his studies.

Returning to his homeland in 2015, Aldiano released the single album Membiasakan Cinta dedicated to friends living with HIV/AIDS (PLHIV), before being appointed 2015–2016 Indonesian AIDS Ambassador.

On 24 August 2016, Aldiano released his third album Persona, 5 years after the previous album. The interval between his second and third albums was because of him thinking thoroughly about the concept of his third album. His time was maximised on focusing on his album. The 10-song album consisted of 7 original songs, 2 rearrangements, and 1 a cappella song. With Laleilmanino, he wrote the composition and lyrics of all the songs. The album was produced over an intense 7-month period. The pre-production, production, and marketing of the album was handled by Aldiano's own label. Vocal recording was done in Indonesia, while mastering was done at Abbey Road Studios, London. In January 2017, the album was certified triple platinum, Aldiano's first, for selling over 250.000 physical copies.

Besides the album, Aldiano also released Persona Art Book. 31 illustrators were involved, selected from the 31.000 who are members of Kreavi. Persona Art Book was a nine-chapter art book which represented visual interpretations of songs from the album. The nine chapters were "Disgust", "Joy", "Hope/Peace", "Wonder", "Courage", "Anger", "Fear", "Sadness", and "Love".

=== 2020s ===
On 22 July 2022, Aldiano released his fourth studio album titled Senandika, which was delayed from 2018 due to COVID-19 pandemic in Indonesia and his infection. The album consisted of 10 songs. The songs on the album tell about Aldiano's life journey since 2018. For example, "Bertahan Lewati Senja" told of his fight against cancer and "Dara" told of his wife. For the production, he collaborated with producer Ari Renaldi. For the songwriting, he collaborated with Barsena Bestandhi, Pika Iskandar, Laleilmanino, Bram Moersas, and his father Harry Aprianto Kissowo. Senandika became the best-selling out of 10 albums with 75,000 copies in 740 KFC Indonesia outlets in July 2022. After two months of release, it sold more than 150,000 copies.

== Artistry ==
=== Influences ===
Aldiano stated that among the musicians who inspired him were Craig David, Michael Jackson, and Luther Vandross.

=== Public image ===
In September 2023, Aldiano announced his comeback to the music industry with the introduction of a new image. With the hashtag #VidiComeback2023 on his social media account, he reintroduced himself with a shorter stage name, VIDI (stylised in all-caps). Besides being shorter and more memorable, the reason behind the name change was because his previous stage name was frequently mispronounced.

Indonesian netizens called him a "goodwill ambassador", because he was frequently invited to weddings of Indonesian celebrities. Netizens viewed that almost all celebrities were his close friends.

== Other activities ==
=== Ambassador ===
From 2014 to 2016, the Indonesian AIDS Foundation declared Aldiano to be the ambassador for HIV/AIDS. As a singer, he campaigned through his single "Membiasakan Cinta" which was released on 2014 World AIDS Day. He also campaigned to Indonesian youths, from social media posts to school and campus visits.

=== Philanthropy ===
Through the #TetapHidup (lit. 'StayAlive') campaign in 2014, he told his fans to donate Rp100 for every click to the "Membiasakan Cinta" teaser on YouTube and Rp1000 for every single play of the song on 112 radio stations. The resulting Rp5.000.000 plus Aldiano's own donations, totalling Rp15.090.800 were donated to the Indonesian AIDS Foundation. In the same year, to commemorate the World AIDS Day, he collaborated with the London School of Public Relations to organise "Youphoria, You Fill the Euphoria" with Zumba and donated part of the earnings from sales of the Rp15.000 tickets to people with HIV/AIDS.

On his 27th birthday, he raised funds for Misbah, a high-achieving child from Yogyakarta, via Kitabisa.com. It was a part of the Birthday Funding program, which provided an opportunity for anyone who wanted to donate on their birthday to those who were in need.

To celebrate Ramadan 2017, Vidi with dessert brand Puyo Dessert organised a social program named Puyo & Vidi Aldiano Peduli Anak Indonesia to help Eastern Indonesian children have access to education by donating Rp100 million to Taman Bacaan Pelangi to build a library in Flores, East Nusa Tenggara. Funds for the donation were taken from Puyo Dessert sales. From every dozen sold, Rp15.000 went to the donation.

=== Entrepreneurship and commercial activities ===
After graduating with an Innovation Management and Entrepreneurship master's degree, Vidi established the record label VA Records in 2014.

Vidi also had a fashion label named VA Apparels, which sold his designed fashion products. It was initially sold exclusively on Instagram, but when Zaskia Sungkar and Irwansyah saw his products, they offered him to join Wokuwoku, an e-commerce website of brands by Indonesian celebrities. The business only lasted a year.

Vidi once initiated a startup named KROWD with Putri Tanjung in 2018. This digital startup was a platform in the form of a web and mobile app to help creators who had difficulties executing their ideas through collaboration. However, the site went inactive since 2019.

Vidi and Kevin Sanjaya collaborated with culinary business company Tasa Group to open a Japanese franchise restaurant with a concept of exclusive private dining named Chanba Japanese Grill in Pantai Indah Kapuk, Jakarta in January 2022 and Rumu Private Room Grill in Adityawarman Street, South Jakarta in January 2023. The third Chanba Private Room Restaurant was opened on 21 March 2024 in Mal Kelapa Gading, North Jakarta.

Celebrating their 4th birthday on 23 August 2022, retail coffee startup Fore Coffee appointed Vidi as a taste critic directly involved in and responsible for the creation, curation, and promotion of the menu. Vidi's debut creation menu was a seasonal drink called The Classic Treasure Series, consisting of four drink variants. The menu was sold until 2023 due to fans' requests to extend the availability duration.

In 2023, Vidi invested in a creative economy venture called Museum Patah Hati (lit. 'Heartbreak Museum'), which was a collaboration between MahakaX and Haluu. He invested with Afgan and Rossa. The museum was opened starting 23 June–22 August 2023 on Chillax Sudirman, Setiabudi, South Jakarta.

== Personal life ==
Vidi dated actress Sheila Dara Aisha since 2015, after both were involved in the TV series Stereo. They broke up in 2018, but rekindled their relationship in 2020. On his 31st birthday on 31 March 2021, Vidi proposed to Sheila. They were formally engaged by 1 December. Vidi married Sheila on 15 January 2022.

=== Title ===
After being married to Sheila, Vidi was bestowed a Minangkabau title. Vidi was bestowed the title Sutan Sari Alam of Bukittinggi so his name became Oxavia Aldiano Sutan Sari Alam.

=== Health and death ===
Vidi suffered from a phobia of cats and heights.

Vidi once suffered anxiety disorder. The disorder was related to his work as a singer. Because of the anxiety disorder, he once fainted before singing onstage in 2018.

In late 2019, Vidi was diagnosed with stage 3 kidney cancer. He then underwent left kidney removal surgery on 13 December 2019 in the Mount Elizabeth Hospital, Singapore. After the kidney was removed, a cancer biopsy was performed and his cancer was discovered to be malignant. He underwent regular health checkups in Singapore. However, in 2021, cancer cells of the same type were rediscovered in his kidney pads. From 2021 until his death, Vidi regularly underwent chemotherapy once every three weeks.

In 2024, after undergoing "detoxification" in Koh Samui, Thailand, he lost 6–7 kilograms (13–15 lb) of body weight due to only being permitted to consume liquids. This caused him to suffer from body dysmorphic disorder.

Vidi died from kidney cancer on 7 March 2026, at the age of 35.

== Discography ==
- Pelangi di Malam Hari (2008)
- Lelaki Pilihan (2009)
- Yang Kedua (2011)
- Persona (2016)
- Senandika (2022)

== Filmography ==
=== Film ===
Year	Title	Role	Notes
2017	Kinetik	Parking attendants	Short film, cameo
2026	Tunggu Aku Sukses Nanti	Buyer	Cameo

=== TV series ===
Year	Title	Role	Notes
2015	Stereo	Alex	season 1, for 29 episodes; season 2, for 11 episodes

=== TV shows ===
Year	Title	TV Station	Notes
2016	Social Media Sensation	Trans TV	as presenter and commentator
2016–2017	Indonesian Idol Junior (Season 2)	MNCTV	as permanent jury
2018	The Next Boy/Girl Band (Season 2)	GTV	as permanent jury
2019	Love Jukebox	Trans TV	as performer
2021	eSports Star Indonesia	GTV	as mentor
2022	The Voice Indonesia	GTV	as coach
2022	The Voice: All-Stars (Indonesia)	GTV	as coach

== Bibliography ==
Title	Details	Ref
Persona	Format: Art book; Release date: 5 August 2016; Publisher: Lintas Kata; ISBN 978-602-6283-01-6	
