= The Voice Indonesia season 2 =

The Voice Indonesia
- Season 2
- Hosted by: Daniel Mananta
- Judges: Ari Lasso; Kaka "Slank"; Agnez Mo; Judika
- Winner: Mario G. Klau
- Winning coach: Kaka "Slank"
- Runner-up: Sekar Teja
- Finals venue: Studio 14 RCTI

Release
- Original network: RCTI
- Original release: February 26 – June 20, 2016

Season chronology
- ← Previous; Season 1 Next → Season 3

The second season of the Indonesian reality talent show The Voice Indonesia premiered February 26, 2016 on the RCTI network in the 9:00 p.m, slot immediately following Tukang Bubur Naik Haji The Series. This is the first aired by RCTI, after the previous broadcaster Indosiar dropped the show after its first one season due to poor ratings. Television personality and Indonesian Idol host Daniel Mananta was appointed as the show's new host, with Ari Lasso, Agnez Mo, Kaka "Slank", and Judika selected as coaches. Coach Ariel "Noah" served as an advisor for all teams during the knockout rounds. The winner of the knockout rounds received a 1 billion rupiahs recording contract with Universal Music Indonesia and a Toyota Yaris AT. The show aired Fridays and Saturdays at 9:00 p.m. Starting on April 1, the show aired every Friday at 9:00 p.m.

On June 20, 2016, Mario G. Klau from Team Kaka "Slank" was announced as the winner, making him the first-ever stolen artist to win the entire Indonesian season.

== Auditions ==
Cities where the auditions were held.

The open call auditions were held in the following locations:

Date	Audition venue	Location
December 22, 2015	Jogja Expo Center	Yogyakarta
December 27, 2015	Balai Prajurit	Surabaya
January 3, 2016	Medan International Convention Center	Medan
January 6, 2016	Sasana Budaya Ganesha	Bandung
January 9–10, 2016	Jakarta International Expo	Jakarta

== Format ==
The series consists of four phases:

=== The Blind Auditions ===
Four judges/coaches, all famous musicians, choose teams of contestants through a blind audition process. Each judge has the length of the contestants' performance to decide if he or she wants that singer on his or her team; if two or more judges want the same singer then the singer chooses which coach they want to work with.

=== Battle round ===
Each team of singers was mentored and developed by their coach. In the second stage, the coaches have two of their team members battle against each other by singing the same song, with the coach choosing which team member will advance to the next stage. However, the contestant who loses the battle round can be stolen by other coach. Like the Blind auction, If two or more coaches attempt to steal a single contestant, the contestant chooses which coach they will work with.

=== Knockout round ===
Like the battle round, each team of singers was mentored and developed by their coach prior to the round beginning. The Knockout Round determines which three artists from each team will advance to the final round of competition, the Live Shows. In this round, after an artist performs, he or she will sit in one of three seats above the stage. The first three artists performing from each team will sit down, but once the fourth artist performs, the coach has the choice of replacing the fourth artist with any artist sitting down, or eliminating them immediately. Once all artists have performed, those who remain seated will advance to the Live Shows.

=== Live performance shows ===
In the final phase, the remaining contestants will compete against each other in live broadcasts. The television audience will help to decide who moves on. When one team member remains for each coach, the contestants compete against each other in the finale, where the winner is selected.

== Teams ==
Color Key

- Winner
- Runner-up
- Third place
- Fourth place
- Eliminated in the Live Shows
- Eliminated in the Playoffs
- Eliminated in the Knockout rounds
- Artist was stolen by another coach in the Battle rounds
- Eliminated in the Battle rounds
- Withdrew

Coaches	Top 79 artists					
Ari Lasso						
Ari Lasso	Nina Yunken	Rifany Maria	Nancy Ponto	Jims Wong	Michel Benhard	Daniel Ferro
Ari Lasso	Atta	Bayu Mahendra	Ineu Noer	M. Maulana	Mark Pieter	Shindy Rosa
Ari Lasso	~~Daniel Pattinama~~	~~Maria Stella~~	Andry Fernando	Chandra Aditya	Ditha Fitrialdi	Krisna Murti
Ari Lasso	Marsinta	Nancy Dhamayanti	Rizki Jonathan	—N/a	—N/a	—N/a
Kaka "Slank"						
Kaka "Slank"	Mario G. Klau	Aline	Maria Stella	Vanessa Axellia	Astrid Caecilia	Andi Wardina
Kaka "Slank"	Afni Kartiantini	Atanasius Feriko	Azel Dinangga	Maruli Liasna	Nathasia Tedja	Rimar Callista
Kaka "Slank"	Diana Rosa	Dita Adiananta	Irene Novianty	Kevin Samuel	M. Habib	Monita Tirtasari
Kaka "Slank"	Selva Nurmadita	Shanny Felicia	Siti Ramadhanty	Vanessa Nethania	—N/a	—N/a
Agnez Mo						
Agnez Mo	Fitri Novianti	Ario Setiawan	Dewi Kisworo	Iskandar	Dodi Rozano	Natasya Misel
Agnez Mo	Benny Tophot	Ilham Mahendra	Irwan Saputra	Joan Allan	Moch. Rifqi	Siti Saniyah
Agnez Mo	~~Mario G. Klau~~	~~Nina Yunken~~	~~Sekar Teja~~	Fransisca Alverina	Grace Anastasia	Julivan
Agnez Mo	Moza Daegal	R Sister	Rio Alvaro	Anastasya Ratih	—N/a	—N/a
Judika						
Judika	Sekar Teja	Gloria Jessica	Refita Mega	Maharani Listya	M. Aziz	Siti Rosalia
Judika	Daniel Pattinama	Mervo	Regina Poetiray	Stefanus Ronaldo	Yogi Ari	Gloria Maria
Judika	~~Dewi Kisworo~~	~~Irwan Saputra~~	~~Mark Pieter~~	Gok Parasian	Intan Rahayuning	Janita Gabriella
Judika	Jansen Daniel	Maizura	Mawar Sari	Ninda Putri	—N/a	—N/a
Note: Italicized names are stolen contestants (names struck through within former teams).

== Blind auditions ==
The blind auditions were filmed in Studio 8 RCTI from January 17 to January 20, 2016. The first episode of the blind auditions premiered on February 26, 2016.

Colour key

✔	Coach hit his/her "I WANT YOU" button
	Artist defaulted to this coach's team
	Artist elected to join this coach's team
	Artist received a "Four-Chair Turn"
	Artist eliminated with no coach pressing his or her "I WANT YOU" button

=== Episode 1 (February 26) ===
Order	Artist	Age	Hometown	Song	Coach's and artist's choices			
Order	Artist	Age	Hometown	Song	Ari	Kaka	Agnez	Judika
1	Maizura	15	Makassar	"Still Into You"	–	✔	–	✔
2	R Sister	15 & 16	Medan	"Style"	–	✔	✔	✔
3	Maruli Liasna	19	Medan	"Beat It"	–	✔	–	–
4	Mutiara Putri	23	Jakarta	"Rindu"	–	–	–	–
5	Dewi Kisworo	15	Yogyakarta	"Royals"	–	✔	–	✔
6	Siti Rosalia	15	Lombok	"Back To Black"	✔	✔	–	✔
7	Imelda Tambunan	29	Medan	"Mengapa"	–	–	–	–
8	Rifany Maria	21	Medan	"Safe & Sound"	✔	✔	✔	✔
9	Chandra Aditya	19	Makassar	"Aku Lelakimu"	✔	–	–	–
10	Regina Poetiray	17	Jakarta	"The Voice Within"	–	✔	–	✔
11	Clara Ayu	22	Jakarta	"You Don't Know My Name"	–	–	–	–
12	Moch. Rifqi	24	Lombok	"Runnin' (Lose It All)"	✔	✔	✔	✔
13	Billy Wino	22	Jakarta	"Mengejar Matahari"	–	–	–	–
14	Michel Benhard	28	Jakarta	"Writing's On The Wall"	✔	–	✔	✔

=== Episode 2 (February 27) ===
Order	Artist	Age	Hometown	Song	Coach's and artist's choices			
Order	Artist	Age	Hometown	Song	Ari	Kaka	Agnez	Judika
1	Mahawaditra	22	Bandung	"Unaware"	–	–	–	–
2	Melati Rahma	23	Yogyakarta	"Love 3x"	–	–	–	–
3	Grace Anastasia	23	Surabaya	"Rehab"	–	✔	✔	–
4	Marsinta	38	Jakarta	"Matahariku"	✔	–	–	–
5	Grace Marla	15	Medan	"Jar of Hearts"	–	–	–	–
6	Maria Stella	18	Pekanbaru	"California King Bed"	✔	✔	–	–
7	Eltasya Natasha	15	Medan	"Unconditionally"	–	–	–	–
8	Amevia Adhila	15	Yogyakarta	"Feeling Good"	–	–	–	–
9	Fitri Novianti	16	Lombok	"Mamma Knows Best"	✔	✔	✔	✔
10	Dita Firdatia	18	Bontang	"Bahasa Kalbu"	–	–	–	–
11	Fransisca Alverina	24	Jakarta	"Almost Is Never Enough"	–	✔	✔	✔
12	Luigi	21 - 27	Bandung	"Malam Biru"	–	–	–	–
13	M. Habib	27	Lombok	"Iron Sky"	✔	✔	✔	–
14	Prince Husein	20	Jakarta	"Sing"	–	–	–	–
15	M. Maulana	34	Surabaya	"Highway to Hell"	✔	✔	–	✔

=== Episode 3 (March 4) ===
Order	Artist	Age	Hometown	Song	Coach's and artist's choices			
Order	Artist	Age	Hometown	Song	Ari	Kaka	Agnez	Judika
1	Aline	30	Jakarta	"Let Her Go"	–	✔	–	–
2	Natasya Misel	19	Jakarta	"Strong"	✔	✔	✔	✔
3	Nina Yunken	22	Bali	"Risalah Hati"	–	–	✔	✔
4	Vanessa Axellia	19	Surabaya	"Halo"	✔	✔	✔	✔
5	Nilam Rifia	21	Madiun	"Love Hurts"	–	–	–	–
6	Rimar Callista	19	Tangerang	"Emotions"	✔	✔	✔	✔
7	Dita Adiananta	21	Jakarta	"Good Times"	–	✔	–	–
8	M. Aziz	23	Malang	"Jealous"	✔	✔	✔	✔
9	Tiara Deta	23	Bandung	"Tears Always Win"	–	–	–	–
10	Gloria Maria	24	Jakarta	"Wrecking Ball"	✔	–	–	✔
11	Helmi Muhammad	29	Bandung	"Fly Me to the Moon"	–	–	–	–
12	Ditha Fitrialdi	22	Bogor	"FourFiveSeconds"	✔	–	–	–

=== Episode 4 (March 5) ===
Order	Artist	Age	Hometown	Song	Coach's and artist's choices			
Order	Artist	Age	Hometown	Song	Ari	Kaka	Agnez	Judika
1	Jody Ilham	30	Bali	"Thinking Out Loud"	–	–	–	–
2	Gok Parasian	22	Medan	"Pergilah Kasih"	✔	–	✔	✔
3	Vanessa Nethania	16	Surabaya	"Terlalu Lama Sendiri"	–	✔	–	–
4	Daniel Ferro	22	Surabaya	"Marry Me"	✔	✔	–	✔
5	Ninda Putri	29	Bandung	"Mercy"	✔	–	✔	✔
6	Sekar Teja	22	Bandung	"Stay With Me"	✔	–	✔	✔
7	Azel Dinangga	17	Bandung	"Gravity"	–	✔	–	–
8	Andry Fernando	22	Bandung	"Stitches"	✔	✔	–	✔
9	Gloria Jessica	21	Jakarta	"I'm Not Your Toy"	–	–	–	✔
10	Daniel Pattinama	21	Jakarta	"Happy"	✔	✔	–	–
11	Chaerunnisa	22	Bandung	"Hello"	–	–	–	–
12	Iskandar	20	Makassar	"I Can't Let Go"	✔	✔	✔	✔

=== Episode 5 (March 11) ===
Order	Artist	Age	Hometown	Song	Coach's and artist's choices			
Order	Artist	Age	Hometown	Song	Ari	Kaka	Agnez	Judika
1	Irwan Saputra	25	Yogyakarta	"Make You Feel My Love"	–	–	–	✔
2	Diana Rosa	34	Bali	"Crazy"	✔	✔	–	–
3	Novita Kusumawardhani	23	Surabaya	"A Love That Will Last"	–	–	–	–
4	Rani Klees	38	Jakarta	"Terlalu Manis"	–	–	–	–
5	Rizki Jonathan	21	Bandung	"If You're My Baby"	✔	✔	–	✔
6	Mervo	17 - 22	Jakarta	"Buktikan"	–	–	✔	✔
7	Silsa Andriani	22	Jakarta	"Wings"	–	–	–	–
8	Yogi Ari	30	Jakarta	"My Sacrifice"	–	✔	–	✔
9	Astrid Caecilia	18	Surabaya	"I'm Not the Only One"	–	✔	–	–
10	Janita Gabriella	16	Jakarta	"Ain't No Way"	–	–	✔	✔
11	Ahmad Rhezanov	28	Jakarta	"Cukup Siti Nurbaya"	–	–	–	–
12	Benny Tophot	23	Jakarta	"Crazy"	✔	✔	✔	–

=== Episode 6 (March 12) ===
Order	Artist	Age	Hometown	Song	Coach's and artist's choices			
Order	Artist	Age	Hometown	Song	Ari	Kaka	Agnez	Judika
1	Jansen Daniel	21	Medan	"What's Up?"	✔	–	–	✔
2	Atta	26	Jakarta	"Uptown Funk"	✔	✔	✔	✔
3	Nathasia Tedja	21	Surabaya	"Rolling in the Deep"	–	✔	–	–
4	Ineu Noer	25	Jakarta	"Blank Space"	✔	–	✔	✔
5	Tiffany Geraldine	18	Jakarta	"It's a Man's Man's Man's World"	–	–	–	–
6	Ario Setiawan	24	West Kalimantan	"Let's Get It On"	✔	✔	✔	✔
7	Salsabilla Septia	17	Jakarta	"Something"	–	–	–	–
8	Andi Wardina	18	Makassar	"Creep"	✔	✔	✔	–
9	Nabila Vanza	18	Jakarta	"Love Yourself"	–	–	–	–
10	Nancy Ponto	33	Bali	"I'd Rather Go Blind"	✔	✔	–	–
11	Ayuning Intan	24	Bandung	"Flashlight"	–	–	–	–
12	Bayu Mahendra	23	Bali	"The Man Who Can't Be Moved"	✔	✔	✔	✔

=== Episode 7 (March 18) ===
Order	Artist	Age	Hometown	Song	Coach's and artist's choices			
Order	Artist	Age	Hometown	Song	Ari	Kaka	Agnez	Judika
1	Chica Fiqri	20	Jakarta	"Like I'm Gonna Lose You"	–	–	–	–
2	Stefanus Ronaldo	22	Jakarta	"When I Was Your Man"	✔	✔	✔	✔
3	Fadhilla Kunta	19	Bandung	"As Long As You There"	–	–	–	–
4	Siti Saniyah	15	Jakarta	"Fight Song"	✔	✔	✔	✔
5	Nayl Author	20	Jakarta	"18 and Life"	–	–	–	–
6	Shindy Rosa	17	Jakarta	"Mata Lelaki"	✔	✔	✔	✔
7	M. Sofyan	25	Jakarta	"Semusim"	–	–	–	–
8	Refita Mega	21	Jakarta	"Dealova"	✔	✔	✔	✔
9	Arya Bima	26	Bandung	"Kaulah Segalanya"	–	–	–	–
10	Krisna Murti	24	Jakarta	"Cinta Sejati"	✔	✔	✔	✔
11	Mario G. Klau	17	Kupang	"To Love Somebody"	–	–	✔	–
12	Afni Kartiantini	32	Jakarta	"Roxanne"	–	✔	✔	✔

=== Episode 8 (March 19) ===
Order	Artist	Age	Hometown	Song	Coach's and artist's choices			
Order	Artist	Age	Hometown	Song	Ari	Kaka	Agnez	Judika
1	Febrina Fransisca	22	Bandung	"Love on Top"	–	–	–	–
2	Intan Rahayuning	25	Jakarta	"Yang Kunanti"	–	–	–	✔
3	Dodi Rozano	23	Bangka Belitung	"Madu 3"	–	–	✔	–
4	Kevin Samuel	23	Jakarta	"Bed of Roses"	✔	✔	–	–
5	Chyntia Clara	32	Bandung	"I Can't Make You Love Me"	–	–	–	–
6	Ilham Mahendra	29	Jakarta	"Lay Me Down"	–	–	✔	✔
7	Siti Ramadhanty	18	Bandung	"Stained"	–	✔	–	–
8	Jims Wong	22	Aceh	"Free Fallin'"	✔	–	–	–
9	Thasya Kenang	16	Pontianak	"All In My Head"	–	–	–	–
10	Maharani Listya	17	Yogyakarta	"Whenever You Call"	–	–	–	✔
11	Anastasya Ratih	30	Jakarta	"Taking A Chance on Love"	–	–	✔	–
12	Nancy Dhamayanti	27	Jakarta	"One and Only"	✔	✔	–	–

=== Episode 9 (March 25) ===
Order	Artist	Age	Hometown	Song	Coach's and artist's choices			
Order	Artist	Age	Hometown	Song	Ari	Kaka	Agnez	Judika
1	Husein Taufik	22	Sumedang	"Holy Grail"	–	–	–	–
2	Atanasius Feriko	23	Cirebon	"Dream a Little Dream of Me"	–	✔	✔	✔
3	Monita Tirtasari	23	Jakarta	"Not Ready to Make Nice"	–	✔	–	–
4	Mawar Sari	39	Surabaya	"Perfect Love"	✔	–	–	✔
5	Julivan	32	Balikpapan	"Come Together"	–	–	✔	✔
6	Joan Allan	24	Manado	"Try a Little Tenderness"	–	–	✔	–
7	Moza Daegal	23	Lampung	"Hurt"	–	–	✔	–
8	Rio Alvaro	16	Padang	"Talking to the Moon"	–	–	✔	–
9	Mark Pieter	18	Jakarta	"Love Never Felt So Good"	–	✔	Team full	✔
10	Shanny Felicia	22	Lombok	"Cobalah Mengerti"	–	✔	Team full	Team full
11	Selva Nurmadita	16	Surabaya	"Fix You"	–	✔	Team full	Team full
12	Senli Restu	19	South Sumatera	"I'm Alive"	–	–	Team full	Team full
13	Irene Novianty	28	Jakarta	"I'm Gonna Find Another You"	–	✔	Team full	Team full

== The Battle rounds ==
The battle rounds were filmed in Studio 8 RCTI on February 26, 2016. The first four-hour episode was broadcast on March 26, 2016. 'Steals' were introduced this season, where each coach could steal two contestants from another team if they lost their battle round.

After the blind auditions, each coach had 19 (Ari Lasso) or 20 (Kaka, Agnez Mo and Judika) contestants for the battle rounds, which aired starting March 26, until April 8. Anastasya Ratih from Team Agnez Mo withdrew from the competition due to pregnancy.

Colour key

✔	Coach hit his/her "I WANT YOU" button
	Artist won the Battle and advanced to the Knockouts
	Artist lost the Battle but was stolen by another coach and advanced to the Knockouts
	Artist lost the Battle and was eliminated

Episodes	Coach	Order	Winner	Song	Loser	'Steal'/'Save' result			
Episodes	Coach	Order	Winner	Song	Loser	Ari	Kaka	Agnez	Judika
Episode 10 (March 26)
Episode 10 (March 26)	Ari Lasso	1	Atta	"Misery"	Andry Fernando	—N/a	–	–	–
Episode 10 (March 26)	Judika	2	Maharani Listya	"Masterpiece"	Dewi Kisworo	–	–	✔	—N/a
Episode 10 (March 26)	Agnez Mo	3	Dodi Rozano	"At Last"	Grace Anastasia	–	–	—N/a	–
Episode 10 (March 26)	Ari Lasso	4	Rifany Maria	"When I Look At You"	Maria Stella	—N/a	✔	–	–
Episode 10 (March 26)	Kaka "Slank"	5	Maruli Liasna	"Mawar Merah"	M. Habib	–	—N/a	–	–
Episode 10 (March 26)	Ari Lasso	6	M. Maulana	"I Want To Break Free"	Chandra Aditya	—N/a	–	–	–
Episode 10 (March 26)	Ari Lasso	7	Ineu Noer	"Route 66"	Ditha Fitrialdi	—N/a	–	–	–
Episode 10 (March 26)	Judika	8	Siti Rosalia	"Can't Feel My Face"	Mark Pieter	✔	–	–	—N/a
Episode 10 (March 26)	Agnez Mo	9	Fitri Novianti	"Who's Lovin' You"	Moza Daegal	–	–	—N/a	–
Episode 10 (March 26)	Judika	10	Gloria Maria	"Heart Attack"	Mawar Sari	–	–	–	—N/a
Episode 10 (March 26)	Kaka "Slank"	11	Andi Wardina	"Ku Tak Bisa"	Siti Ramadhanty	–	—N/a	–	–
Episode 10 (March 26)	Judika	12	M. Aziz	"Demons"	Ninda Putri	–	–	–	—N/a
Episode 11 (April 1)	Judika	1	Stefanus Ronaldo	"One Last Cry"	Gok Parasian	–	–	–	—N/a
Episode 11 (April 1)	Ari Lasso	2	Nancy Ponto	"All I Ask"	Nancy Dhamayanti	—N/a	–	–	–
Episode 11 (April 1)	Agnez Mo	3	Ilham Mahendra	"Say Something"	Sekar Teja	–	–	—N/a	✔
Episode 11 (April 1)	Kaka "Slank"	4	Vanessa Axellia	"I Slank U"	Vanessa Nethania	–	—N/a	–	–
Episode 11 (April 1)	Ari Lasso	5	Jims Wong	"I Got You (I Feel Good)"	Daniel Pattinama	—N/a	–	–	✔
Episode 11 (April 1)	Ari Lasso	5	Michel Benhard	"I Got You (I Feel Good)"	Daniel Pattinama	—N/a	–	–	✔
Episode 11 (April 1)	Judika	6	Gloria Jessica	"I'll Stand By You"	Intan Rahayuning	–	–	–	—N/a
Episode 11 (April 1)	Agnez Mo	7	Ario Setiawan	"Kiss Me Quick"	Mario G. Klau	–	✔	—N/a	✔
Episode 11 (April 1)	Judika	8	Regina Poetiray	"Mimpi"	Maizura	–	Team full	–	Team full
Episode 11 (April 1)	Kaka "Slank"	9	Aline	"Kamu Harus Pulang"	Shanny Felicia	–	Team full	–	Team full
Episode 11 (April 1)	Agnez Mo	10	Siti Saniyah	"Stay"	R Sister	–	Team full	—N/a	Team full
Episode 11 (April 1)	Judika	11	Mervo	"If I Ain't Got You"	Janita Gabriella	–	Team full	–	Team full
Episode 11 (April 1)	Kaka "Slank"	12	Atanasius Feriko	"Juwita Malam"	Dita Adiananta	–	Team full	–	Team full
Episode 11 (April 1)	Judika	13	Yogi Ari	"The Second You Sleep"	Jansen Daniel	–	Team full	–	Team full
Episode 12 (April 8)
Episode 12 (April 8)	Kaka "Slank"	1	Astrid Caecilia	"Kupu Biru"	Kevin Samuel	–	Team full	–	Team full
Episode 12 (April 8)	Ari Lasso	2	Daniel Ferro	"Man on a Wire"	Rizki Jonathan	—N/a	Team full	–	Team full
Episode 12 (April 8)	Kaka "Slank"	3	Rimar Callista	"Terlalu Manis"	Monita Tirtasari	–	Team full	–	Team full
Episode 12 (April 8)	Agnez Mo	4	Iskandar	"Gravity"	Nina Yunken	✔	Team full	—N/a	Team full
Episode 12 (April 8)	Judika	5	Refita Mega	"Wrecking Ball"	Irwan Saputra	Team full	Team full	✔	Team full
Episode 12 (April 8)	Agnez Mo	6	Benny Tophot	"Lost Stars"	Julivan	Team full	Team full	Team full	Team full
Episode 12 (April 8)	Agnez Mo	6	Joan Allan	"Lost Stars"	Julivan	Team full	Team full	Team full	Team full
Episode 12 (April 8)	Kaka "Slank"	7	Nathasia Tedja	"Suit-Suit... He-He... (Gadis Sexy)"	Irene Novianty	Team full	Team full	Team full	Team full
Episode 12 (April 8)	Ari Lasso	8	Shindy Rosa	"What's Up?"	Marsinta	Team full	Team full	Team full	Team full
Episode 12 (April 8)	Agnez Mo	9	Moch. Rifqi	"Señorita"	Rio Alvaro	Team full	Team full	Team full	Team full
Episode 12 (April 8)	Ari Lasso	10	Bayu Mahendra	"Somewhere Only We Know"	Krisna Murti	Team full	Team full	Team full	Team full
Episode 12 (April 8)	Kaka "Slank"	11	Azel Dinangga	"Virus"	Selva Nurmadita	Team full	Team full	Team full	Team full
Episode 12 (April 8)	Agnez Mo	12	Natasya Misel	"Don’t Go"	Fransisca Alverina	Team full	Team full	Team full	Team full
Episode 12 (April 8)	Kaka "Slank"	13	Afni Kartiantini	"I Miss You But I Hate You"	Diana Rosa	Team full	Team full	Team full	Team full

== The Knockouts ==
The knockout rounds were filmed in Studio 8 RCTI between March 29 and 30, 2016. After the battle round, each coach had 12 contestants for the Live Shows. The knockout round follows the new format of three-chair challenge introduced in the Dutch version of the show. For the knockouts, Ariel "Noah" was assigned as a mentor for contestants in all four teams. Gloria Maria from Team Judika withdrew from the competition due to health issues.

Color key:

Artist was selected by his/her coach and advanced to the Live Shows
Artist was eliminated

Episode	Coach	Order	Artist	Song	Result
Episode 13 (April 15)
Episode 13 (April 15)	Agnez Mo	1	Iskandar	"I Believe In You And Me"	Advanced
Episode 13 (April 15)	Agnez Mo	2	Joan Allan	"Rindu"	Eliminated
Episode 13 (April 15)	Agnez Mo	3	Irwan Saputra	"Lost"	Eliminated
Episode 13 (April 15)	Agnez Mo	4	Dewi Kisworo	"Muda (Le O Le O)"	Advanced
Episode 13 (April 15)	Agnez Mo	5	Ario Setiawan	"Jealous"	Advanced
Episode 13 (April 15)	Agnez Mo	6	Benny Tophot	"Mengejar Matahari"	Eliminated
Episode 13 (April 15)	Judika	7	Regina Poetiray	"Through the Fire"	Eliminated
Episode 13 (April 15)	Judika	8	Mervo	"Bukan Dia Tapi Aku"	Eliminated
Episode 13 (April 15)	Judika	9	Refita Mega	"I Believe I Can Fly"	Advanced
Episode 13 (April 15)	Judika	10	Siti Rosalia	"Takkan Ada Cinta Yang Lain"	Advanced
Episode 13 (April 15)	Judika	11	Gloria Jessica	"A Sky Full of Stars"	Advanced
Episode 13 (April 15)	Judika	12	Yogi Ari	"You Give Love a Bad Name"	Eliminated
Episode 14 (April 22)
Episode 14 (April 22)	Kaka "Slank"	1	Nathasia Tedja	"When I Was Your Man"	Eliminated
Episode 14 (April 22)	Kaka "Slank"	2	Mario G. Klau	"Thinking Out Loud"	Advanced
Episode 14 (April 22)	Kaka "Slank"	3	Rimar Callista	"Bennie and the Jets"	Eliminated
Episode 14 (April 22)	Kaka "Slank"	4	Atanasius Feriko	"Tega"	Eliminated
Episode 14 (April 22)	Kaka "Slank"	5	Maria Stella	"Aku Ini Punya Siapa"	Advanced
Episode 14 (April 22)	Kaka "Slank"	6	Andi Wardina	"Esok Kan Masih Ada"	Advanced
Episode 14 (April 22)	Ari Lasso	7	Shindy Rosa	"Takut"	Eliminated
Episode 14 (April 22)	Ari Lasso	8	Nancy Ponto	"Piece By Piece"	Advanced
Episode 14 (April 22)	Ari Lasso	9	Ineu Noer	"Cinta Kan Membawamu Kembali"	Eliminated
Episode 14 (April 22)	Ari Lasso	10	Mark Pieter	"It's a Beautiful Day"	Eliminated
Episode 14 (April 22)	Ari Lasso	11	Daniel Ferro	"Dancing on My Own"	Advanced
Episode 14 (April 22)	Ari Lasso	12	Michel Benhard	"Hallelujah"	Advanced
Episode 15 (April 29)
Episode 15 (April 29)	Agnez Mo	1	Fitri Novianti	"I Just Want to Make Love to You"	Advanced
Episode 15 (April 29)	Agnez Mo	2	Moch. Rifqi	"Firasat"	Eliminated
Episode 15 (April 29)	Agnez Mo	3	Natasya Misel	"High Hopes"	Advanced
Episode 15 (April 29)	Agnez Mo	4	Siti Saniyah	"One and Only"	Eliminated
Episode 15 (April 29)	Agnez Mo	5	Ilham Mahendra	"Jealous"	Eliminated
Episode 15 (April 29)	Agnez Mo	6	Dodi Rozano	"Feeling Good"	Advanced
Episode 15 (April 29)	Kaka "Slank"	7	Vanessa Axellia	"One Night Only"	Advanced
Episode 15 (April 29)	Kaka "Slank"	8	Afni Kartiantini	"Don't Speak"	Eliminated
Episode 15 (April 29)	Kaka "Slank"	9	Azel Dinangga	"To Love Somebody"	Eliminated
Episode 15 (April 29)	Kaka "Slank"	10	Aline	"Anyer 10 Maret"	Advanced
Episode 15 (April 29)	Kaka "Slank"	11	Astrid Caecilia	"Sampai Habis Air Mataku"	Advanced
Episode 15 (April 29)	Kaka "Slank"	12	Maruli Liasna	"Over and Over Again"	Eliminated
Episode 16 (May 6)
Episode 16 (May 6)	Ari Lasso	1	M. Maulana	"Cryin'"	Eliminated
Episode 16 (May 6)	Ari Lasso	2	Bayu Mahendra	"Yang Terlupakan"	Eliminated
Episode 16 (May 6)	Ari Lasso	3	Rifany Maria	"Gone, Gone, Gone"	Advanced
Episode 16 (May 6)	Ari Lasso	4	Atta	"I'll Always Be Right There"	Eliminated
Episode 16 (May 6)	Ari Lasso	5	Nina Yunken	"Alone"	Advanced
Episode 16 (May 6)	Ari Lasso	6	Jims Wong	"Somebody That I Used to Know"	Advanced
Episode 16 (May 6)	Judika	7	Maharani Listya	"Human"	Advanced
Episode 16 (May 6)	Judika	8	Stefanus Ronaldo	"Pillowtalk"	Eliminated
Episode 16 (May 6)	Judika	9	Daniel Pattinama	"Pelangi"	Eliminated
Episode 16 (May 6)	Judika	10	M. Aziz	"Benci Untuk Mencinta"	Advanced
Episode 16 (May 6)	Judika	11	Sekar Teja	"Suara Hati Seorang Kekasih"	Advanced

== Live shows ==
The live shows are the final phase of the competition. The shows were filmed at the Studio 8 RCTI, Jakarta.

Color key:

Artist was saved by the Public's votes
Artist was saved by his/her coach
Artist was eliminated

=== Week 1: Top 24 Group A (May 13) ===
Episode	Coach	Order	Artist	Song	Result
Episode 17 (May 13)
Episode 17 (May 13)	Judika	1	Siti Rosalia	"Crazy in Love"	Eliminated
Episode 17 (May 13)	Judika	2	Maharani Listya	"Akhir Cerita Cinta"	Judika's Choice
Episode 17 (May 13)	Judika	3	Gloria Jessica	"Immortal Love Song"	Public's Vote
Episode 17 (May 13)	Agnez Mo	4	Fitri Novianti	"Summertime"	Agnez's Choice
Episode 17 (May 13)	Agnez Mo	5	Dewi Kisworo	"Bitch Better Have My Money"	Public's Vote
Episode 17 (May 13)	Agnez Mo	6	Natasya Misel	"Angel"	Eliminated
Episode 17 (May 13)	Kaka "Slank"	7	Maria Stella	"September Ceria"	Public's Vote
Episode 17 (May 13)	Kaka "Slank"	8	Andi Wardina	"Titanium"	Eliminated
Episode 17 (May 13)	Kaka "Slank"	9	Aline	"Bongkar"	Kaka's Choice
Episode 17 (May 13)	Ari Lasso	10	Jims Wong	"Work"	Ari's Choice
Episode 17 (May 13)	Ari Lasso	11	Daniel Ferro	"Chasing Cars"	Eliminated
Episode 17 (May 13)	Ari Lasso	12	Rifany Maria	"Anugerah Terindah Yang Pernah Kumiliki"	Public's Vote

=== Week 2: Top 24 Group B (May 20) ===
Episode	Coach	Order	Artist	Song	Result
Episode 18 (May 20)
Episode 18 (May 20)	Agnez Mo	1	Ario Setiawan	"Kiss from a Rose"	Public's Vote
Episode 18 (May 20)	Agnez Mo	2	Iskandar	"Unconditionally"	Agnez's Choice
Episode 18 (May 20)	Agnez Mo	3	Dodi Rozano	"Superstition"	Eliminated
Episode 18 (May 20)	Ari Lasso	4	Nancy Ponto	"Respect"	Public's Vote
Episode 18 (May 20)	Ari Lasso	5	Michel Benhard	"Kasih Tak Sampai"	Eliminated
Episode 18 (May 20)	Ari Lasso	6	Nina Yunken	"Elastic Heart"	Ari's Choice
Episode 18 (May 20)	Judika	7	Sekar Teja	"Broken Vow"	Public's Vote
Episode 18 (May 20)	Judika	8	M. Aziz	"When We Were Young"	Eliminated
Episode 18 (May 20)	Judika	9	Refita Mega	"Misteri Cinta"	Judika's Choice
Episode 18 (May 20)	Kaka "Slank"	10	Mario G. Klau	"Malaikat"	Public's Vote
Episode 18 (May 20)	Kaka "Slank"	11	Astrid Caecilia	"Just Give Me a Reason"	Eliminated
Episode 18 (May 20)	Kaka "Slank"	12	Vanessa Axellia	"Like A Virgin"	Kaka's Choice

=== Week 3: Live Playoff 1 (May 27) ===
Episode	Coach	Order	Artist	Song	Result
Episode 19 (May 27)
Episode 19 (May 27)	Ari Lasso	1	Nina Yunken	"Chasing Pavements"	Public's Vote
Episode 19 (May 27)	Ari Lasso	2	Rifany Maria	"One Call Away"	Public's Vote
Episode 19 (May 27)	Ari Lasso	3	Jims Wong	"Love Me Like You Do"	Eliminated
Episode 19 (May 27)	Ari Lasso	4	Nancy Ponto	"XO"	Ari's Choice
Episode 19 (May 27)	Kaka "Slank"	5	Aline	"Hotline Bling"	Kaka's Choice
Episode 19 (May 27)	Kaka "Slank"	6	Maria Stella	"Turning Tables"	Public's Vote
Episode 19 (May 27)	Kaka "Slank"	7	Vanessa Axellia	"Skyscraper"	Eliminated
Episode 19 (May 27)	Kaka "Slank"	8	Mario G. Klau	"Tetap Dalam Jiwa"	Public's Vote
Episode 19 (May 27)	Judika	9	Sekar Teja	"Hey Mama"	Public's Vote
Episode 19 (May 27)	Judika	10	Maharani Listya	"Secret Love Song"	Eliminated
Episode 19 (May 27)	Judika	11	Gloria Jessica	"Habits (Stay High)"	Public's Vote
Episode 19 (May 27)	Judika	12	Refita Mega	"Stone Cold"	Judika's Choice
Episode 19 (May 27)	Agnez Mo	13	Fitri Novianti	"Bang Bang"	Agnez's Choice
Episode 19 (May 27)	Agnez Mo	14	Ario Setiawan	"All of Me"	Public's Vote
Episode 19 (May 27)	Agnez Mo	15	Iskandar	"Hollow"	Eliminated
Episode 19 (May 27)	Agnez Mo	16	Dewi Kisworo	"What's My Name?"	Public's Vote

=== Week 4: Live Playoff 2 (June 3) ===
Episode	Coach	Order	Artist	Song	Result
Episode 20 (June 3)
Episode 20 (June 3)	Kaka "Slank"	1	Maria Stella	"Part of Me"	Eliminated
Episode 20 (June 3)	Kaka "Slank"	2	Mario G. Klau	"Like I'm Gonna Lose You"	Public's Vote
Episode 20 (June 3)	Kaka "Slank"	3	Aline	"Terbunuh Sepi"	Kaka's Choice
Episode 20 (June 3)	Ari Lasso	4	Nancy Ponto	"Hello"	Eliminated
Episode 20 (June 3)	Ari Lasso	5	Rifany Maria	"The Climb"	Ari's Choice
Episode 20 (June 3)	Ari Lasso	6	Nina Yunken	"Love"	Public's Vote
Episode 20 (June 3)	Agnez Mo	7	Fitri Novianti	"All Over Again"	Agnez's Choice
Episode 20 (June 3)	Agnez Mo	8	Ario Setiawan	"Autonomy"	Public's Vote
Episode 20 (June 3)	Agnez Mo	9	Dewi Kisworo	"All About That Bass"	Eliminated
Episode 20 (June 3)	Judika	10	Sekar Teja	"Clown"	Public's Vote
Episode 20 (June 3)	Judika	11	Refita Mega	"Lithium"	Eliminated
Episode 20 (June 3)	Judika	12	Gloria Jessica	"Selepas Kau Pergi"	Judika's Choice

=== Week 5: Semifinals (June 10) ===
Semifinals held on 20:30, due to be aired at 22:30 on UEFA Euro 2016 will show the opening ceremony and opening match between France and Romania, where the RCTI become the official broadcasting rights.

The four finalists were originally from the same team (Team Agnez).

Episode	Coach	Order	Artist	Song	Result
Episode 21 (June 10)
Episode 21 (June 10)	Kaka "Slank"	1	Aline	"Apanya Dong"	Eliminated
Episode 21 (June 10)	Kaka "Slank"	2	Mario G. Klau	"One Love/People Get Ready"	Advanced
Episode 21 (June 10)	Ari Lasso	3	Rifany Maria	"I Don't Want to Miss a Thing"	Eliminated
Episode 21 (June 10)	Ari Lasso	4	Nina Yunken	"Don't Stop the Music"	Advanced
Episode 21 (June 10)	Agnez Mo	5	Fitri Novianti	"Giving Myself"	Advanced
Episode 21 (June 10)	Agnez Mo	6	Ario Setiawan	"I Can't Make You Love Me"	Eliminated
Episode 21 (June 10)	Judika	7	Gloria Jessica	"All I Want"	Eliminated
Episode 21 (June 10)	Judika	8	Sekar Teja	"Lovesong"	Advanced

=== Week 6: Finals (June 20) ===
Especially for this Spectacular, held on Monday, June 20, 2016 for the June 17, 2016, will show the UEFA Euro 2016 match between Italy-Sweden and Czech Republic-Croatia.

Coach	Artist	Order	Solo Song	Order	Solo Song	Result
Judika	Sekar Teja	1	"Salute"	5	"New York State of Mind"	Runner-up
Ari Lasso	Nina Yunken	2	"Don't Be So Hard On Yourself"	6	"The Scientist"	Fourth Place
Agnez Mo	Fitri Novianti	3	"Confetti"	7	"Listen"	Third Place
Kaka "Slank"	Mario G. Klau	4	"Rock N Roll"	8	"Cinta Pertama dan Terakhir"	Winner

Non-competition performances
Order	Performer	Song
1	The finalist (Mario, Fitri, Nina, Sekar)	"Lean On"
2	Raisa	"Cahaya Cantik Hatimu"

== Elimination chart ==
=== Overall ===
Color key
Artist's info

- Team Ari Lasso
- Team Kaka
- Team Agnez Mo
- Team Judika

Result details

- Winner
- Runner-up
- Third place
- Fourth place
- Artist was saved by his/her coach
- Artist was saved by the public
- Artist was eliminated
- Artist did not perform on that particular week

Live show results per week
Artist	Week 1	Week 2	Week 3	Week 4	Week 5	Finals
Mario G. Klau		Safe	Safe	Safe	Safe	Winner
Sekar Teja		Safe	Safe	Safe	Safe	Runner-up
Fitri Novianti	Safe		Safe	Safe	Safe	3rd place
Nina Yunken		Safe	Safe	Safe	Safe	4th place
Aline	Safe		Safe	Safe	Eliminated	Eliminated (Week 5)
Rifany Maria	Safe		Safe	Safe	Eliminated	Eliminated (Week 5)
Ario Setiawan		Safe	Safe	Safe	Eliminated	Eliminated (Week 5)
Gloria Jessica	Safe		Safe	Safe	Eliminated	Eliminated (Week 5)
Maria Stella	Safe		Safe	Eliminated	Eliminated (Week 4)	
Nancy Ponto		Safe	Safe	Eliminated	Eliminated (Week 4)	
Dewi Kisworo	Safe		Safe	Eliminated	Eliminated (Week 4)	
Refita Mega		Safe	Safe	Eliminated	Eliminated (Week 4)	
Jims Wong	Safe		Eliminated	Eliminated (Week 3)		
Vanessa Axellia		Safe	Eliminated	Eliminated (Week 3)		
Maharani Listya	Safe		Eliminated	Eliminated (Week 3)		
Iskandar		Safe	Eliminated	Eliminated (Week 3)		
Dodi Rozano		Eliminated	Eliminated (Week 2)			
Michel Benhard		Eliminated	Eliminated (Week 2)			
M. Aziz		Eliminated	Eliminated (Week 2)			
Astrid Caecilia		Eliminated	Eliminated (Week 2)			
Siti Rosalia	Eliminated	Eliminated (Week 1)				
Natasya Misel	Eliminated	Eliminated (Week 1)				
Andi Wardina	Eliminated	Eliminated (Week 1)				
Daniel Ferro	Eliminated	Eliminated (Week 1)				

=== Team ===
Color key
Artist's info

- Team Ari Lasso
- Team Kaka
- Team Agnez Mo
- Team Judika

Result details

- Winner
- Runner-up
- Third Place
- Fourth Place
- Eliminated
- Did not perform

Artist	Week 1	Week 2	Week 3	Week 4	Week 5	Finals
Nina Yunken		Coach's choice	Public's vote	Public's vote	Advanced	Fourth Place
Rifany Maria	Public's vote		Public's vote	Coach's choice	Eliminated	
Nancy Ponto		Public's vote	Coach's choice	Eliminated		
Jims Wong	Coach's choice		Eliminated			
Michel Benhard		Eliminated				
Daniel Ferro	Eliminated					
Mario G. Klau		Public's vote	Public's vote	Public's vote	Advanced	Winner
Aline	Coach's choice		Coach's choice	Coach's choice	Eliminated	
Maria Stella	Public's vote		Public's vote	Eliminated		
Vanessa Axellia		Coach's choice	Eliminated			
Astrid Caecilia		Eliminated				
Andi Wardina	Eliminated					
Fitri Novianti	Coach's choice		Coach's choice	Coach's choice	Advanced	Third Place
Ario Setiawan		Public's vote	Public's vote	Public's vote	Eliminated	
Dewi Kisworo	Public's vote		Public's vote	Eliminated		
Iskandar		Coach's choice	Eliminated			
Dodi Rozano		Eliminated				
Natasya Misel	Eliminated					
Sekar Teja		Public's vote	Public's vote	Public's vote	Advanced	Runner-up
Gloria Jessica	Public's vote		Public's vote	Coach's choice	Eliminated	
Refita Mega		Coach's choice	Coach's choice	Eliminated		
Maharani Listya	Coach's choice		Eliminated			
M. Aziz		Eliminated				
Siti Rosalia	Eliminated					

== Contestants who appeared on other talent shows ==
- Rayfida from R.Sister previously auditioned for Mamamia Show (season 4) in 2014 where she was eliminated at Top 8.
- Dewi Kisworo, Mervo, Benny Tophot, M. Aziz, and Rifany Maria (Soulmotion) previously auditioned for Rising Star Indonesia in 2014.
- M. Habib, Janita Gabriella, Natasya Misel, Rani Klees, Daniel Ferro, Irwan Saputra, Ario Setiawan, Julivan, Jansen Daniel, Gok Parasian (Gogoi) and Rizki Jonathan - Andry Fernando (2RF) previously auditioned for X Factor Indonesia in 2015.
- Intan Rahayuning and Febrina Fransisca previously auditioned for Indonesian Idol in 2014.
- Vanessa Axelia, Sekar Teja, and Novita Kusumawardhani previously auditioned for NEZacademy in 2013.
- Chaerunnissa previously auditioned for Mamamia Show (season 3) in 2010 where she was eliminated at Top 5.
- Gloria Maria previously auditioned for Cherrybelle Cari Chibi in 2012 where she was eliminated at Elimination 1.
- Astrid Caecilia previously auditioned for Indonesia Mencari Bakat (season 3) in 2012 where she was eliminated at Semi Finals.
- After failing to make a team, Prince Husein auditioned for Just Duet. He was eliminated at elimination.
- Helmi Muhammad, who failed to turn a chair in the blind auditions, auditioned for the second season of Q Academy.
- Mawar Sari previously auditioned for Asia Bagus in 1998.

== See also ==
- The Voice Indonesia
- The Voice Indonesia (season 1)
- 19th Annual Panasonic Gobel Awards
