= Billy Simpson (singer) =

Indonesian singer-songwriter and musician

Billy Simpson (born 17 July 1987) is an Indonesian singer-songwriter, musician, producer and multi-instrumentalist. He is the winner of the first season of The Voice Indonesia.

== Career ==
In February 2013, Simpson passed the Blind-Audition of The Voice Indonesia which is aired in Indosiar TV. Singing the song One by U2 gave him a 4-chair-turn and he picked Giring Ganesha from the band Nidji as his coach.

At the TOP 24, Simpson presented his own ‘twist’ of "Beautiful", a song originally performed by Cherrybelle, and managed to get to the next stage of the competition.

Fans from all over Indonesia started to follow Simpson and call themselves "Billyvers"

Today, Simpson is the first winner of the show.

== Discography ==
=== Album ===
- 2013: "Lukisanku" now available on iTunes.
- 2013: "Christmas with Billy Simpson"

== Lukisanku: Track listing ==
All tracks are written by Simpson, with lyrics by Simpson except where noted.

No.	Title	Length
1.	"Sabarlah"	3:33
2.	"Janjimu Itu"	3:39
3.	"Dekat Hati (lyrics by Billy Simpson, music by Billy Simpson and Andre Hermanto"	3:51
4.	"Tak Kusangka"	3:31
5.	"Kamu (lyrics and music by Billy Simpson & Bian)"	4:40
6.	"Aku Menyesal (lyrics by Billy Simpson, music by Giring Ganesha of band Nidji, Ariel of band Nidji and Billy Simpson)"	4:38
7.	"Jembatan Pengharapan"	4:02
8.	"Indah Hidup Ini (lyrics by Billy Simpson, music by Billy Simpson and Lucky Barus)"	4:25
9.	"Cerita Mentari"	5:03
10.	"Lukisanku (lyrics by Billy Simpson, music by Giring Ganesha of band Nidji, Ariel of band Nidji and Billy Simpson)"	3:33
Total length:		41:00

=== Singles ===
- 2010: "The Best Is What I Will Get"
- 2013: "Jembatan Pengharapan" "Sabarlah"
- 2014: "Janjimu Itu"
- 2014: "Storyline"
- 2016: "Envy You"
- 2017: "Sendiri"
- 2018: "I Need Love feat Rayi “RAN”"

== Filmography ==
- Kado Kendo (2007)

== Advertisements ==
- Billboard at ITC Roxy Mas, Soekarno Hatta Billboard and Wall Panels (May 2013 - April 2014)
- Chevrolet Spin

== Other media appearances ==
- Kuala Lumpur Lake Garden Festival 17 August 2014 - Tribute to victims of MH 17
- TOP 50 CLEO Indonesia Bachelor 2014
- Up Close and Personal with Billy Simpson at @America Pacific Place 11 July 2014
- Indonesia Morning Show on NET TV 12 June 2014
- MostFM Interview Medan 30 May 2014
- Press Conference launching of Janjimu Itu Video Clip at Grand Indonesia 8 May 2014
- HardRock FM Bandung Anniversary Celebration with Billy Simpson 26 April 2014
- NEW Famili 100 with Tukul ep 154 on Indosiar 22 April 2014
- Paskah LIVE from Fatican on Indosiar with Billy Simpson 20 April 2014
- Sarah Sechan Show on NET TV 28 March 2014
- Opening Act for Michael Learns to Rock concert in Jakarta, Skeeno Hall Gandaria City 19 February 2014
- LOVE CINTA with Radio OZ Bandung 31 January 2014
- Star Radio Padang Press Conference at G Sports Center Padang 27 January 2014
- HUT 19 Indosiar Aksi Gemilang 11 January 2014
- Harmoni 13 December 2013 at SCTV (Indonesia)
- Festival Film Indonesia 7 December 2013 at SCTV (Indonesia)
- Presenter of Yahoo! OMG Awards 2013 at Indosiar for 2 categories:
1. Favorite New Comedian won by Raditya Dika
2. Sexiest Dad won by Mike Lewis
- Simpson performing at Java Soulnation 6 October 2013 with Shane Filan a former lead singer of Westlife
- Special performance at Take Me Out Indonesia Season 4 Episode 73 aired 10 September 2013 at Indosiar
- Featured artist of OMG Yahoo! Flickr Seleb
- Gebyar BCA 29 June 2013 at Indosiar
- SOS 21 June 2013 at ANTV
- HTC One Product Launch
- The Grand Opening of The Disco by Edward Suhadi
- IPH School, Surabaya graduation

== Awards and honors ==
- Artist of the Month by CDBS 94.5FM Radio Bali
- Featured Artist by Radio Nusantara Universitas
- World Wide Trending Topic in Twitter during the finals of The Voice Indonesia

== Personal life ==
After returning from Australia, Simpson joined Jakarta Praise Community Church.

On 24 November 2018, he married Sally Santoso.

Awards and achievements
Preceded by N/A	The Voice Indonesia; Winner; 2013	Succeeded by Mario G. Klau
