= The Voice Indonesia =

Indonesian television series

- Also known as: The Voice Indonesia: The Real Singer (season 1); The Voice Indonesia: Only Your Voice Will Save You (season 2)
- Genre: Reality television
- Created by: John de Mol Jr.
- Based on: The Voice franchise
- Presented by: Ananda Omesh; Astrid Tiar; Conchita Caroline; Daniel Mananta; Darius Sinathrya; Fenita Arie; Gracia Indri; Robby Purba
- Judges: Armand Maulana; Glenn Fredly; Sherina Munaf; Giring Ganesha; Ari Lasso; Agnez Mo; Kaka; Judika; Anggun; Titi DJ; Nino Kayam & Vidi Aldiano; Isyana Sarasvati
- Composer: Martijn Schimmer
- Country of origin: Indonesia
- Original language: Indonesian
- No. of seasons: 4
- No. of episodes: 83

Production
- Executive producers: John de Mol Jr. Indra Yudhistira (Indosiar-2013); Fabian Dharmawan (RCTI-2016); Victor Setiawan (GTV-2018–2019)
- Production locations: Studio 5 Indosiar (2013); Studio 8 RCTI (2016; Blind Audition, Battle Round, Knockout Round, Live Shows, Live Playoffs, Semi-final); Studio 14 RCTI (2016; Final); MNC Studios Studio 8 (2018–2019)
- Camera setup: Multi-camera
- Running time: 120–240 minutes (incl. adverts)

Original release
- Network: Indosiar (2013); RCTI (2016); GTV (2018–2019)
- Release: 10 February 2013 – 28 November 2019

Related
- The Voice (franchise); The Voice of Holland; The Voice (American TV series); The Voice UK

The Voice Indonesia is an Indonesian reality television singing competition created by John de Mol Jr. It premiered on 10 February 2013 on Indosiar.

After the first season concluded, Indosiar dropped the show due to poor ratings. In 2016, RCTI won the rights to the show, and a second season went into production with Indonesian television producer Fabian Dharmawan at the helm after successful seasons with Indonesian Idol and X Factor Indonesia. However, in June 2017, RCTI announced that they would not be continuing the show. In June 2018, it was announced that their sister channel GTV would revive the show for a third season.

The show has produced four winners to date: Billy Simpson, Mario G. Klau, Aldo Longa, and Vionita Veronika.

The original judging panel line-up in 2013 consisted of Armand Maulana, Giring Ganesha, Glenn Fredly, and Sherina Munaf. In 2016, the judging panel was replaced by Ari Lasso, Agnez Mo, Kaka "Slank", and Judika.

The programme was commissioned after a successful first series in the United Stattes, where the programme aired on NBC. The winners received cash prize, an all-new car unit, and a record deal with Universal Music Indonesia (season 1 through 3) and Hits Records (season 4).

== History ==
The Voice Indonesia was created by John de Mol Jr. in the Netherlands and is based on the original Dutch series. de Mol then began to grow and expand the competition franchise of The Voice, and in 2013, the Indonesian version of the show was launched on Indosiar, the same channel as the highly successful Akademi Fantasi Indosiar. However, due to poor ratings, Indosiar dropped The Voice Indonesia after one season.

In 2016, once the eighth and final season of Indonesian Idol were completed (the vows were cancelled and rolled out again in the ninth season), it was announced that RCTI went into a "bidding war" with Global TV to obtain the rights of The Voice Indonesia, which they later won, and a second season went into production.

== Format ==
The series consists of four phases:

- The blind auditions
- The battle round
- The knockout round (Season 2)
- Live performance shows

=== The Blind Auditions ===
Four judges/ coaches, all famous musicians, will choose teams of contestants through a blind audition process. Each judge has the length of the auditionee's performance to decide if he or she wants that singer on his or her team; if two or more judges want the same singer then the singer gets to choose which coach they want to work with. In the fourth season, a new twist called "Block" is featured, which allows one coach to block another coach from getting a contestant. The artist's journey on the show comes to an end if no coach selects him/she. The blind auditions end when each coach has a set number of contestants to work with. Coaches dedicate themselves to developing their singers mentally, musically and in some cases, physically, giving them advice, and sharing the secrets of their success.

=== Battle round ===
Each team of singers will be mentored and developed by their coach. In the second stage, coaches will have two of their team members battle against each other by singing the same song, with the coach choosing which team member will advance to the next stage. A new element was added in season two; coaches were given two "steals", allowing each coach to select two individuals who were eliminated during a battle round by another coach.

=== Knockout round (Season 2) ===
As with the battle round, each team of singers will be mentored and developed by their coach. The Knockout Round determines which three artists from each team will advance to the final round of competition, the Live Shows. In this round, after an artist performs, he or she will sit in one of three seats above the stage. The first three artists performing from each team will sit down, but once the fourth artist performs, a coach has the choice of replacing the fourth artist with any artist sitting down or eliminating them immediately. Once all artists have performed, those who remain seated will advance to the Live Shows.

=== Live performance shows ===
In the final phase, the remaining contestants will compete against each other in live broadcasts. The television audience will help to decide who moves on. Once one team member remains for each coach, the contestants compete against each other in the finale.

== Hosts and coaches ==
=== Hosts ===
The first season's host was confirmed to be sport presenter Darius Sinathrya. Caroline Conchita served as the "backstage online and social media correspondent" for the live show week 1 and Fenita Arie for week 2 onwards. The second season's host was the TV host, VJ, and actor, Daniel Mananta. The third season was hosted by comedian, actor, and TV host Ananda Omesh from Kids version and Astrid Tiar. Ananda Omesh returned for the fourth season but Astrid Tiar was replaced by Gracia Indri.

=== Coaches ===
==== Season 1 ====
In October 2012, four coaches were chosen: Sherina Munaf, Glenn Fredly, Giring Ganesha and Armand Maulana. Sherina Munaf began her singing, acting, and musical career when she was a girl. Glenn Fredly is a soul-pop singer and known has a lot of romantic songs. Giring Ganesha is a frontman of Nidji, while Armand Maulana is a frontman of Gigi. Coach Glenn Fredly died after a long battle with meningitis on 8 April 2020.

==== Season 2 ====
In January 2016, four coaches were chosen: Ari Lasso, Kaka Satriaji, Agnez Mo and Judika Sihotang. Agnez Mo began her singing and acting career when she was a girl and becoming one of international superstar. Ari Lasso is a pop rock singer and former frontman of Dewa 19. Kaka is a frontman of Slank, while Judika is a runner-up of Indonesian Idol 2005 and pop-rock singer with huge vocal range.

==== Season 3 ====
In August 2018, four coaches were chosen: frontman of Gigi Band Armand Maulana who was previously a coach in season 1, international diva and Asia's Got Talent judge Anggun, Indonesian pop diva and former Indonesian Idol judge Titi DJ and, also a duo coach consisting of two young singers, Vidi Aldiano and member of musical group RAN Nino Kayam. In 2013, Nino Kayam beside member of musical group RAN. He have project musical group with 2 members of musical group Maliq & D'Essential guitarist Lale and keyboardist Ilman formed of musical group Laleilmanino.

==== Season 4 ====
The fourth season began in August 2019 with new coach. Young talented singer-songwriter, musician, and actress Isyana Sarasvati replaced Anggun and joined the panel with the remaining coaches.

== Coaches' teams ==
Color key

- Winner
- Runner-up
- Third place
- Fourth place

Winners are in bold, the finalists in the finale are in small italicized font, and the eliminated artists are in small font.

Season
Season	Armand Maulana	Sherina Munaf	Glenn Fredly	Giring Ganesha
1	Leona Dwi Untari; Ferdinand Pardosi; Al Fattah; Dian Permata Saferina; Arro; Roni Satria	Agseisa Galuh Putri; Pritta Kartika; Santi Danametta; Rizky Inggar; Fredy Lona; Rebecca Louis Quinto	Tiara Degrasia; Saptoto Nugroho; Monika Yulianti; Gilbert Pohan; Desy Agustina; Eik Montecarlo	**Billy Simpson**; Abdi Siahaan; Luise Aminah Najib; Ayu Nanda Maharani; Arden Purwanto Wijaya; Lilian Rumapea
Season
Season	Ari Lasso	Kaka	Agnez Mo	Judika
2
2	Nina Yunken; Rifany Maria; Nancy Ponto; Jims Wong; Michel Benhard; Daniel Ferro	**Mario G. Klau**; Aline; Maria Stella; Vanessa Axellia; Astrid Caecilia; Andi Wardina	Fitri Novianty; Ario Setiawan; Dewi Kisworo; Iskandar; Dodi Rozano; Natasya Misel	Sekar Teja; Gloria Jessica; Refita Mega; Maharani Listya; M. Aziz; Siti Rosalia
Season
Season	Armand Maulana	Anggun	Nino & Vidi	Titi DJ
3
3	**Ronaldo Longa**; Virzha Ikhtiarini; Anggi Marito; Octarianti Artha; Anis Novinda; Ramanda Almuna; Christiana Chindy; Daniel Jonathan	Rambu Piras; I Made Avapayatha; Eunike Bella; King Daepanie; Novia Noval; Taufik Hidayat; Alisha Mikaila; Rena Pradhita	Gok Parasian; Philipus Joseph; Agseisa Galuh; Jasmine Risach; Richard Jeremy; Shafira Putri; Faisal Kevin; Jaqlien Elsy	Febrian Ihsan; Waode Andraini; Gancar Asanegara; Hendra Jogi; Anggraeiny Faradhita; Keisha Andaviar; Dodi Rozano; Priscilla Evangelinna
Season
Season	Armand Maulana	Titi DJ	Nino & Vidi	Isyana Sarasvati
4
4	Elly Chia; Bagus Agung; Suci Yantini; Jordie Yose; Trianetha Henuk	**Vionita Veronika**; Genya Kurnain; Ferlita Ningtyas; Wijaya Kusuma	Tesalonika Manalu; Natasya & Hizkia; Belinda Khaerana; Gery & Ganhy	Nikita Becker; Kaleb Jonathaniel; Joy Fernando; Tommy Vincent

=== Coaches' timeline ===
Edition	Coach	Seasons			
Edition	Coach	1	2	3	4
Original Edition	Armand				
Original Edition	Sherina				
Original Edition	Glenn †				
Original Edition	Giring				
Original Edition	Ari				
Original Edition	Kaka				
Original Edition	Agnez				
Original Edition	Judika				
Original Edition	Titi DJ				
Original Edition	Vidi † & Nino				
Original Edition	Anggun				
Original Edition	Isyana				
All-Stars Edition	Armand		—N/a		
All-Stars Edition	Titi DJ		—N/a		
All-Stars Edition	Vidi † & Nino		—N/a		
All-Stars Edition	Isyana		—N/a		

Coaches gallery

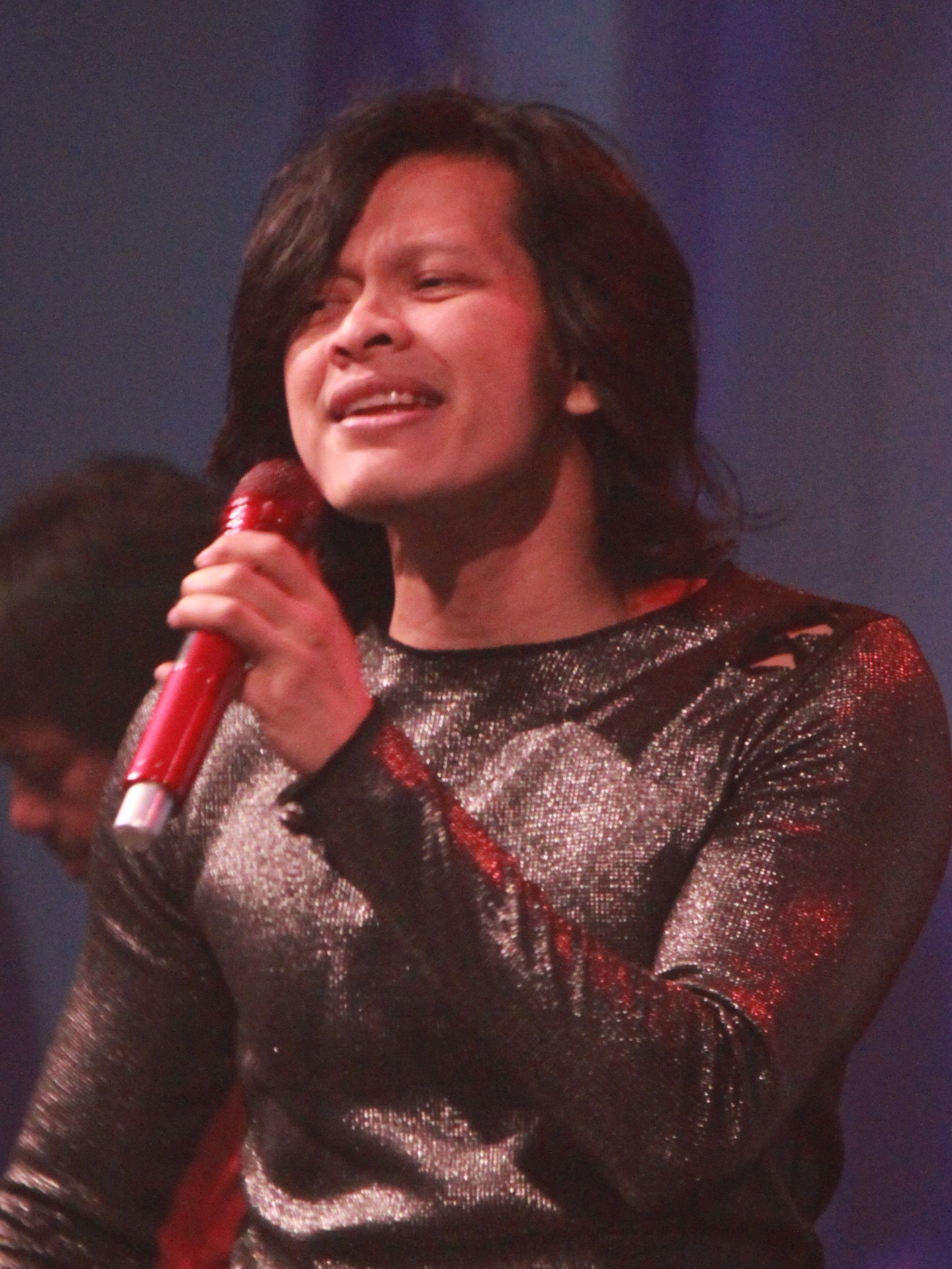
Armand Maulana (2013, 2018–2019)

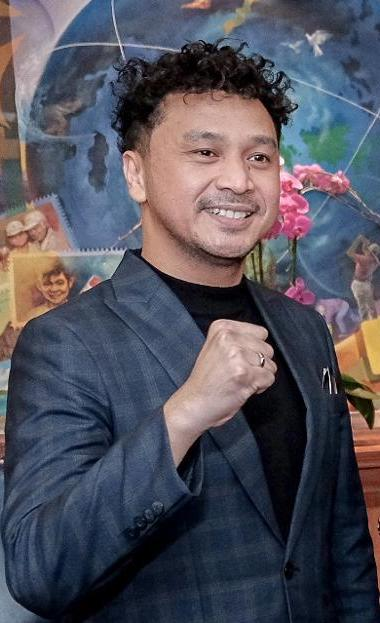
Giring Ganesha (2013)

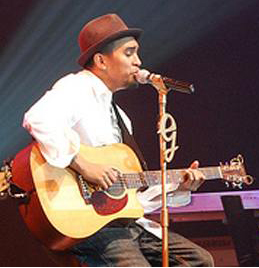
Glenn Fredly (2013) †

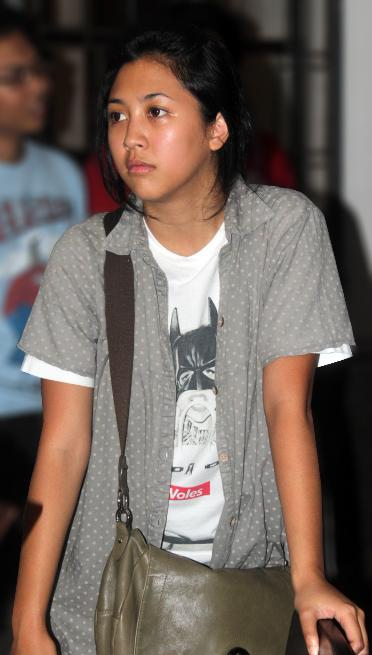
Sherina Munaf (2013)

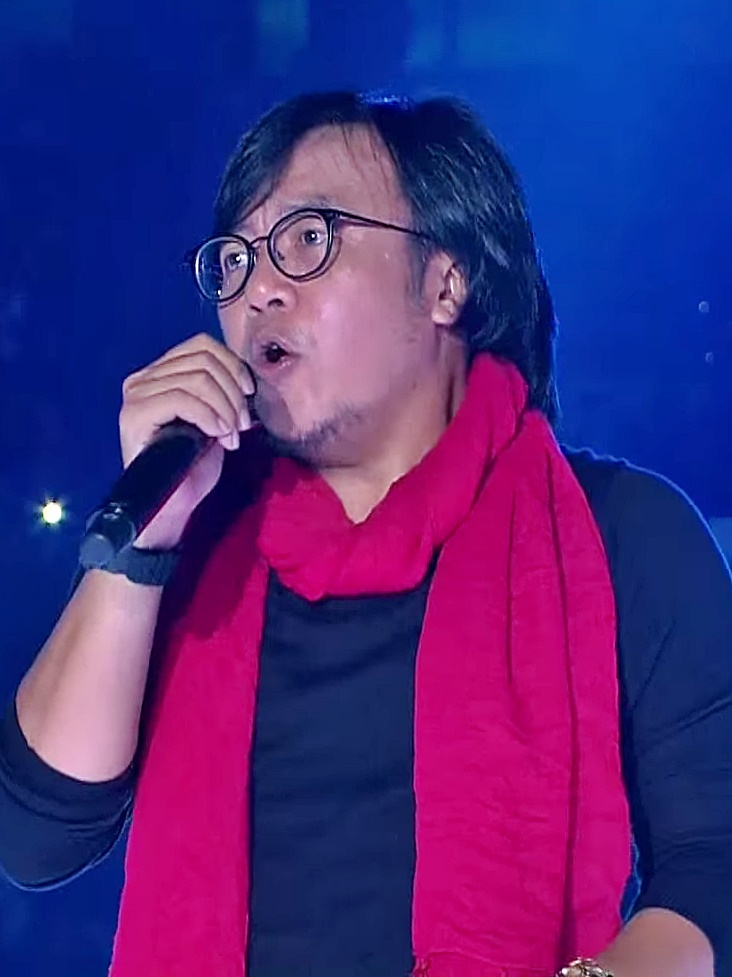
Ari Lasso (2016)

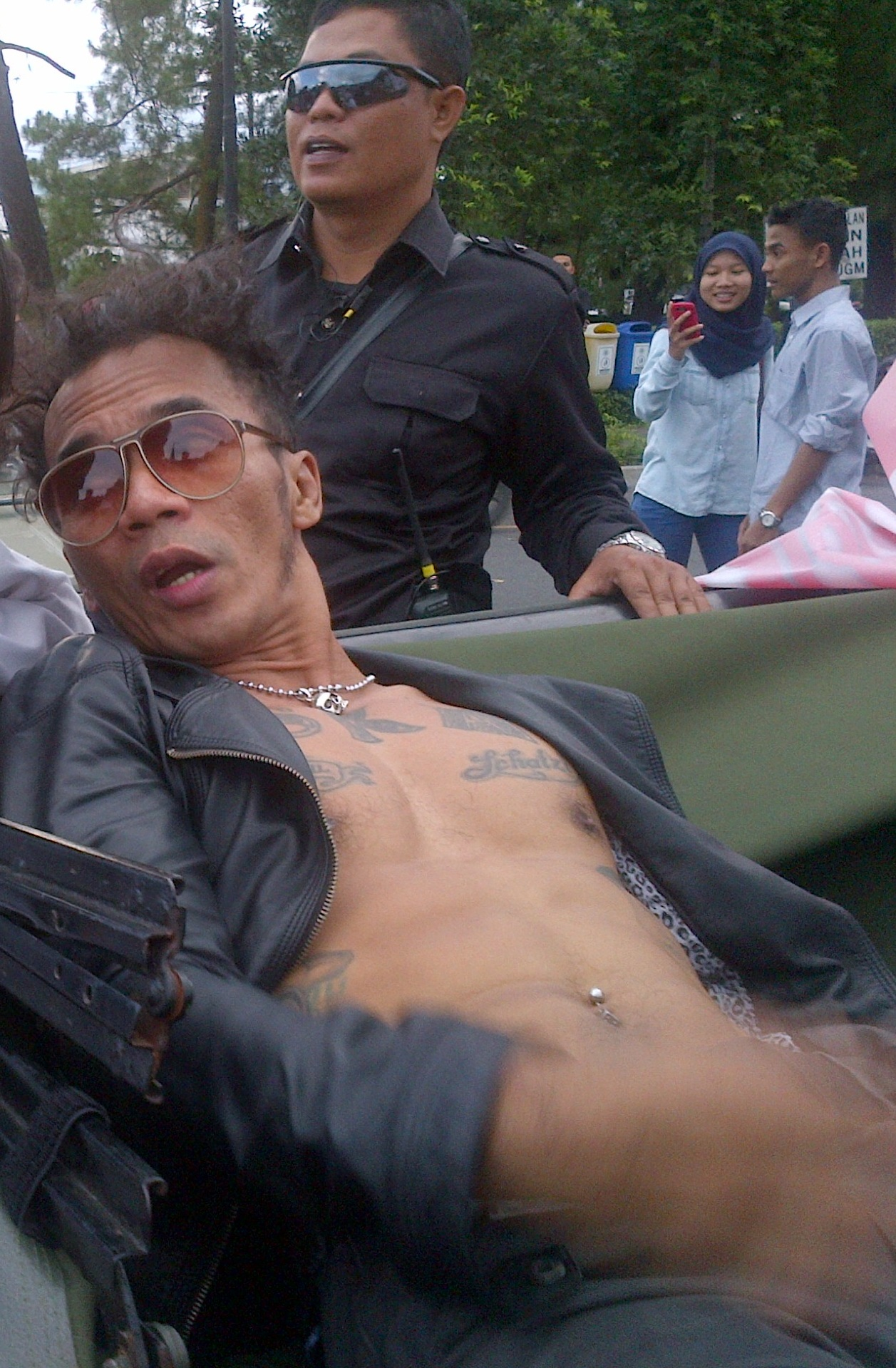
Kaka Satriaji (2016)

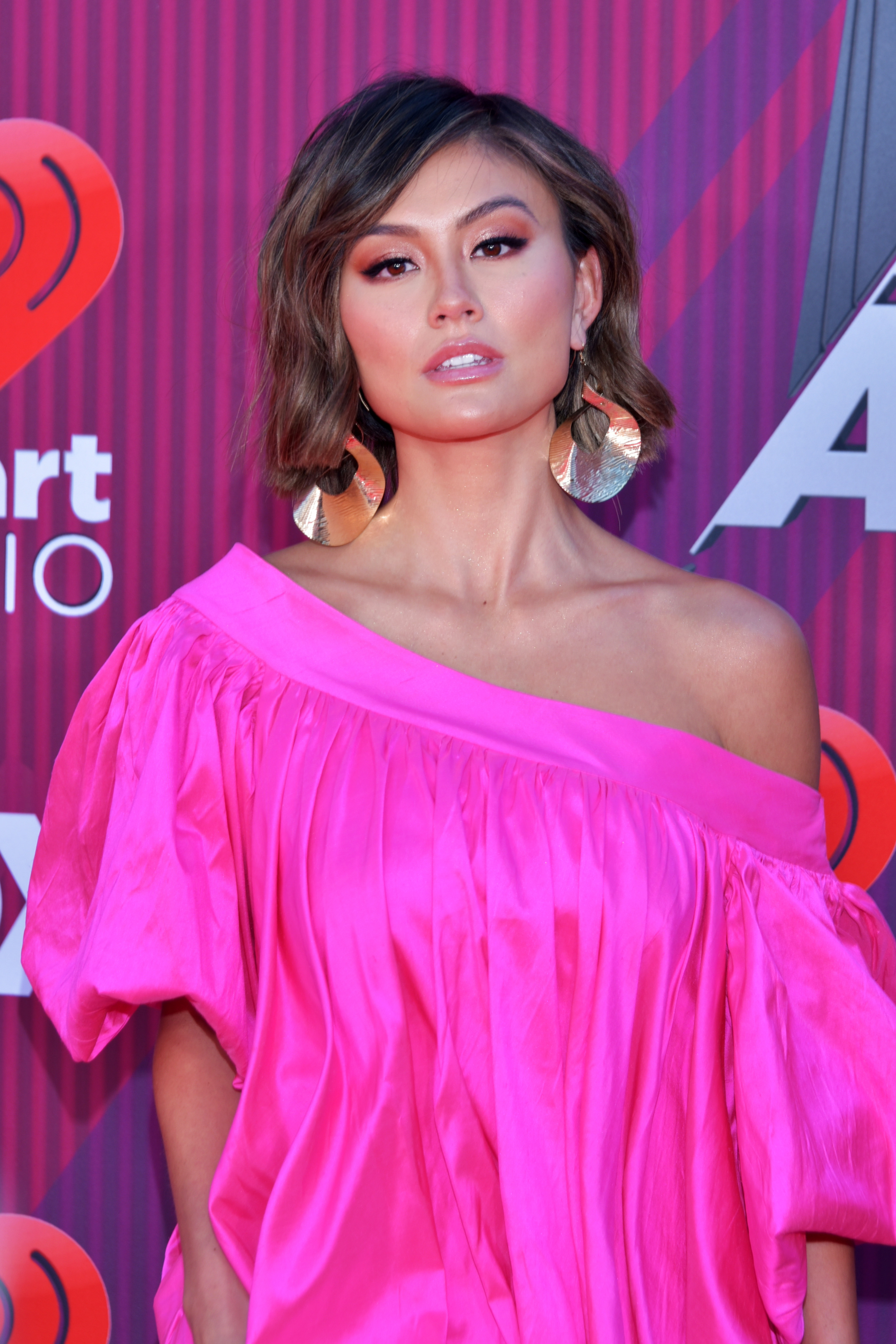
Agnez Mo (2016)

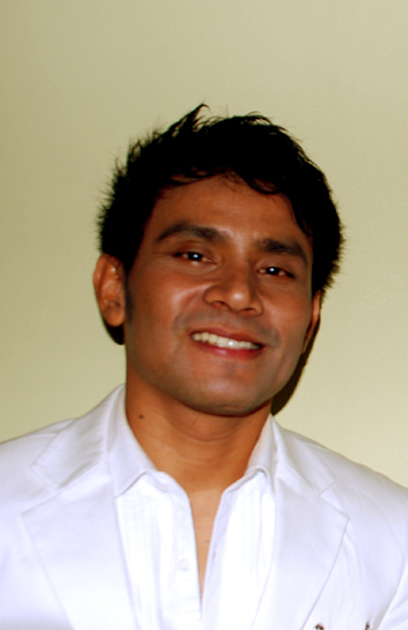
Judika (2016)

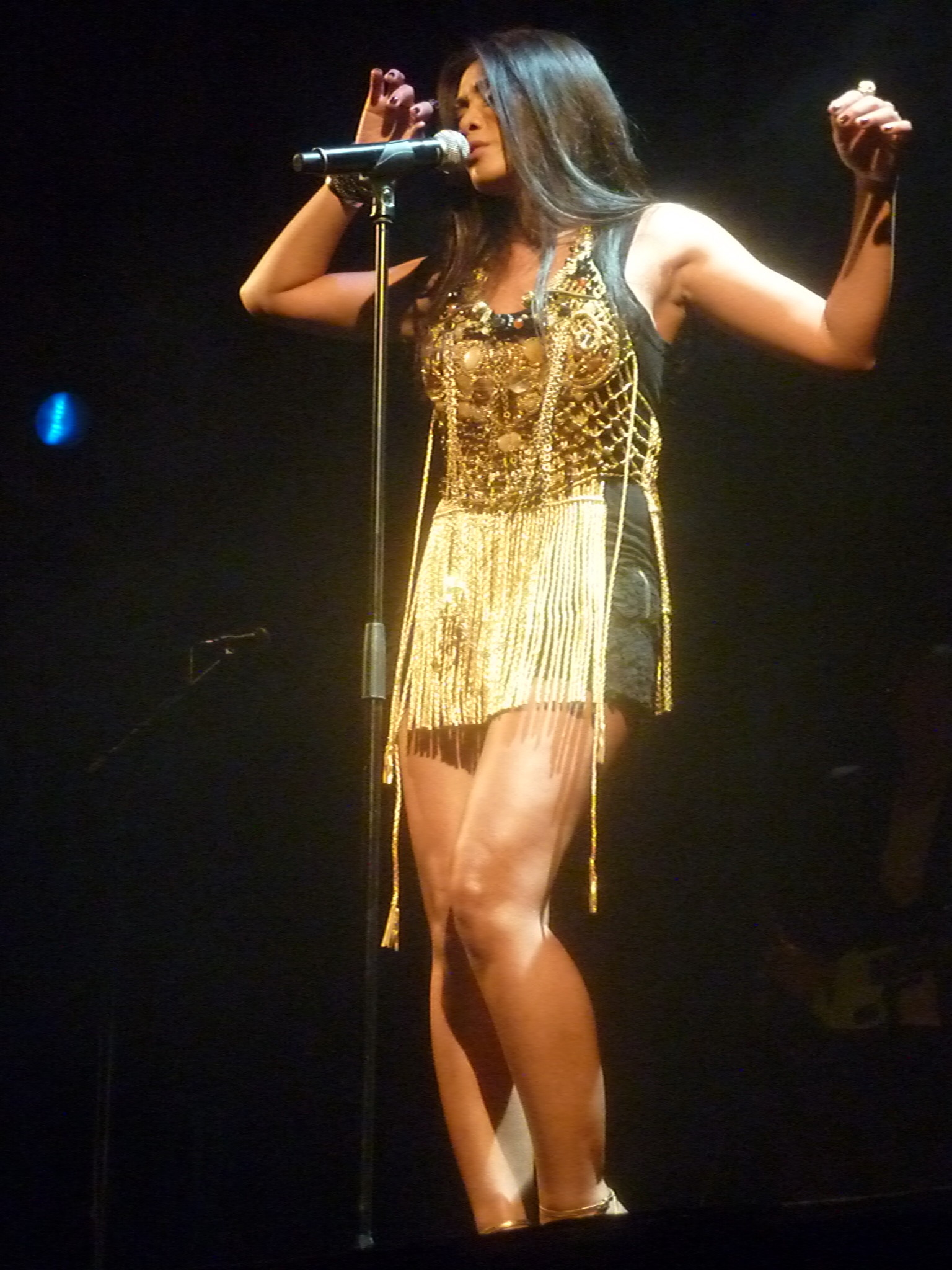
Anggun (2018)

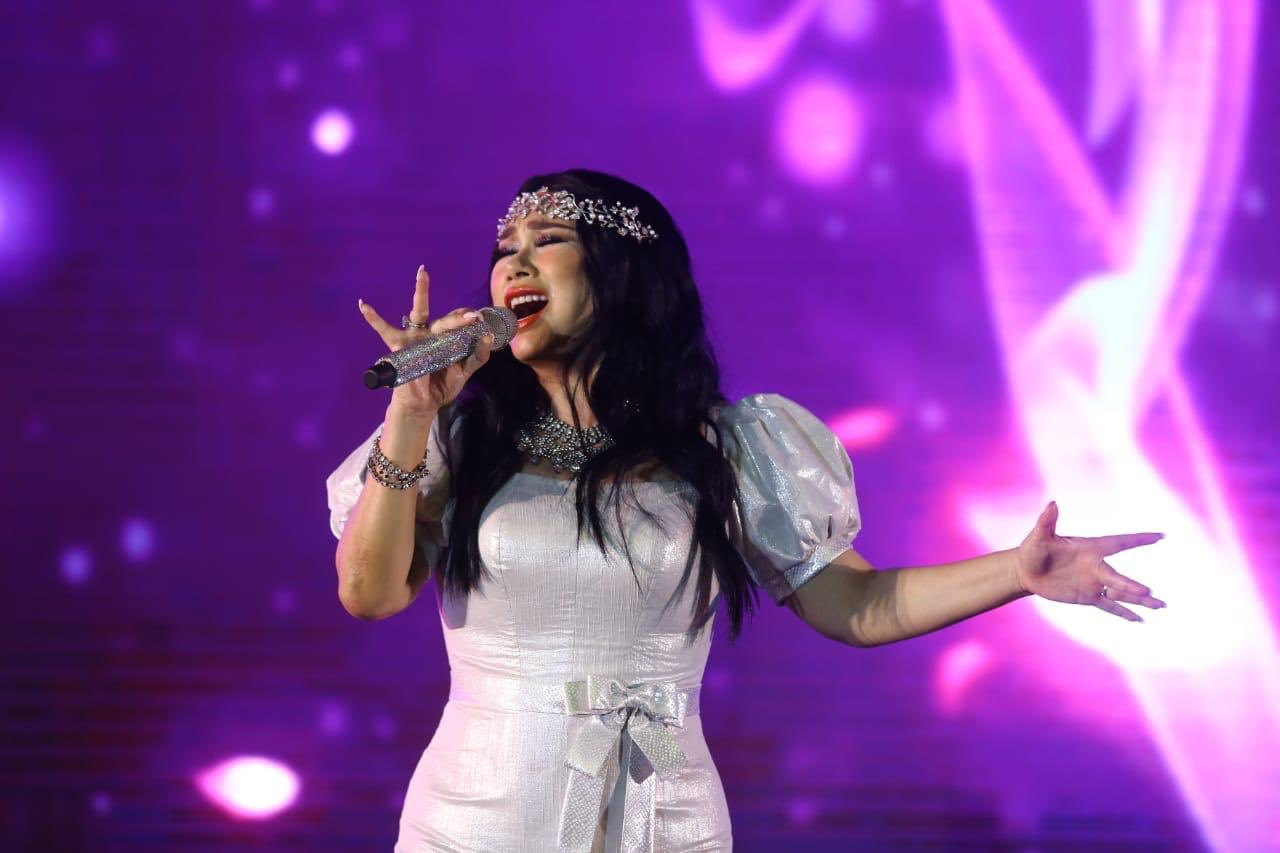
Titi DJ (2018–2019)

Nino Kayam (duo, 2018–2019)

Vidi Aldiano (duo, 2018–2019) †

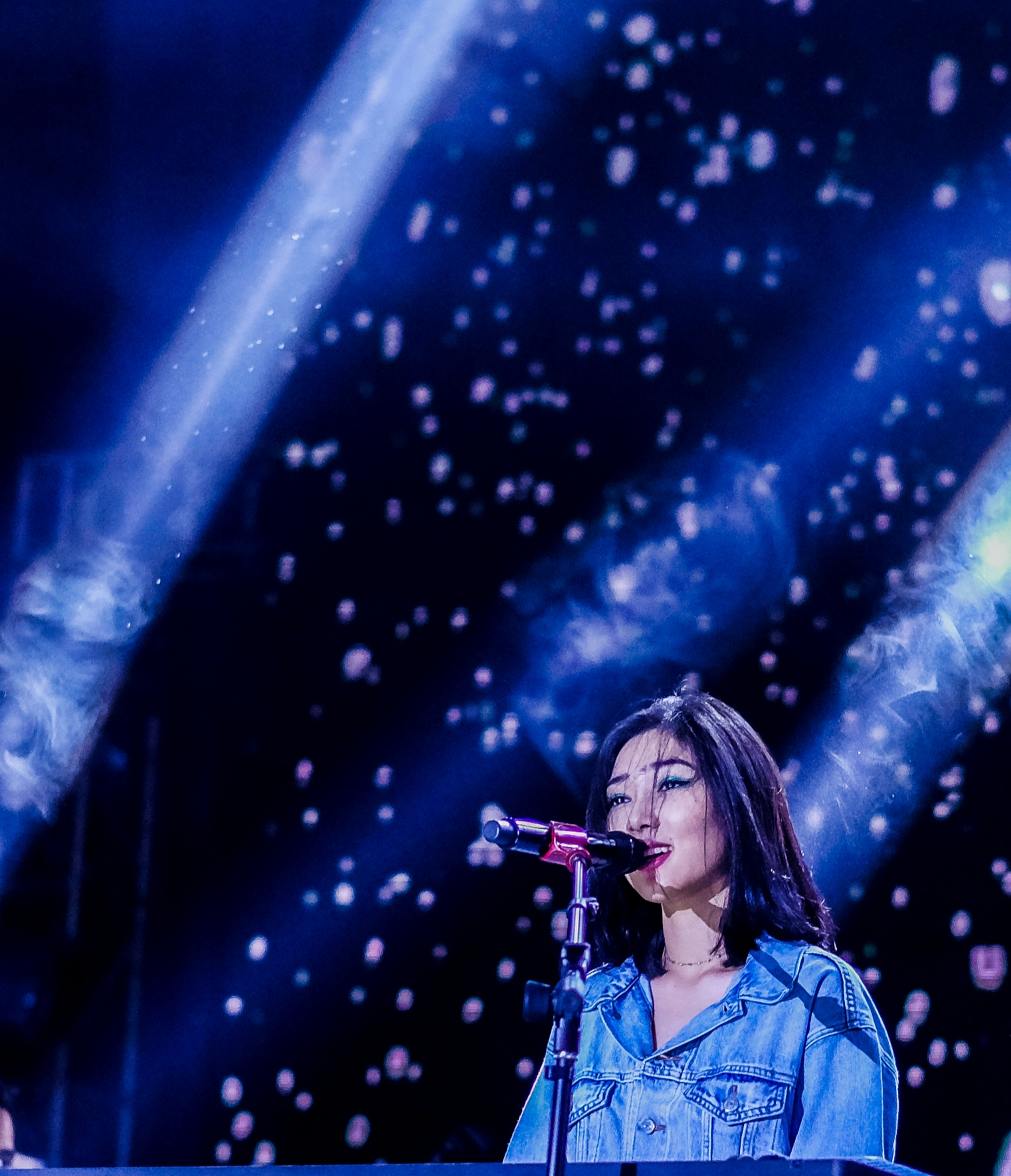
Isyana Sarasvati (2019)

== Guest mentors and advisors ==
Season	Armand Maulana	Sherina Munaf	Glenn Fredly	Giring Ganesha
1	Once Mekel	Vina Panduwinata	Ello	Titi DJ
Season	Ari Lasso	Kaka	Agnez Mo	Judika
2	Ariel			
Season	Armand Maulana	Anggun	Nino & Vidi	Titi DJ
3	Maia Estianty	Melly Goeslaw	Sherina Munaf	Indra Lesmana
Season	Armand Maulana	Titi DJ	Nino & Vidi	Isyana Sarasvati
4	Kunto Aji	Andien Aisyah	Marcell	Gamaliel Tapiheru

== Series overview ==
Colour key

Team Armand
Team Glenn
Team Giring
Team Sherina
Team Agnez
Team Ari
Team Judika
Team Kaka
Team Anggun
Team Titi DJ
Team Nino & Vidi
Team Isyana
Team Nino

Warning: the following table presents a significant amount of different colors.

Season	First aired	Last aired	Winner	Runner-up	Third place	Fourth place	Fifth place	Winning coach	Hosts			Coaches (chairs' order)			
Season	First aired	Last aired	Winner	Runner-up	Third place	Fourth place	Fifth place	Winning coach	Main	Backstage		1	2	3	4
1	10 Feb 2013	2 Jun 2013	Billy Simpson	Leona Dwi	Tiara Degrasia	Agseisa Galuh	—N/a	Giring Ganesha	Darius Sinathriya	Conchita Caroline	Fenita Arie	Armand	Sherina	Glenn	Giring
2	26 Feb 2016	20 Jun 2016	Mario G. Klau	Sekar Teja	Fitri Novianti	Nina Yunken	—N/a	Kaka Satriaji	Daniel Mananta			Ari	Kaka	Agnez	Judika
3	1 Nov 2018	28 Mar 2019	Aldo Longa	Rambu Piras	Virzha Ikthtiarini	Gok Parasian	—N/a	Armand Maulana	Ananda Omesh	Astrid Tiar		Armand	Anggun	Vidi & Nino	Titi DJ
4	29 Aug 2019	28 Nov 2019	Vionita Veronika	Elly Chia	Tesalonika Manalu	Nikita Becker	Bagus Agung	Titi DJ	Ananda Omesh	Gracia Indri		Armand	Titi DJ	Vidi & Nino	Isyana

== The Voice All-Stars ==
After a 2-year break, The Voice Indonesia announced through Instagram and other social media platforms that they will be broadcasting an All-Star edition in 2022. The show will occur by GTV. This season will join by former contestants, former coaches and winners in every season except first season and include Kids version. The coaches are Armand Maulana, Titi DJ, Vidi & Nino & Isyana Sarasvati, same as fourth season of the main show. This edition is hosted by TV host, VJ and actor Robby Purba.

Team Armand
Team Titi DJ
Team Vidi & Nino
Team Isyana

Season	First Aired	Last Aired	Winner	Other finalist(s)	Winning coach	Presenter(s)	Guest Presenter(s)	Coaches (chairs' order)			
Season	First Aired	Last Aired	Winner	Other finalist(s)	Winning coach	Presenter(s)	Guest Presenter(s)	1	2	3	4
1	17 Jun 2022	19 Aug 2022	Jogi Simanjuntak	I Made Avapayatha, Jaqlien Elsy, Shyakira Fatiha, Shafira Putri, Wasisco Lianro, Abdul Izati, Jean Harefa	Titi DJ	Robby Purba	Astrid Tiar	Armand	Titi DJ	Vidi & Nino	Isyana

== Accolades ==
Year	Award	Category	Recipients	Result
2013	Yahoo! OMG! Awards	Favorite TV Show	The Voice Indonesia	Nominated
2016	19th Annual Panasonic Gobel Awards	Favorite Talent Show & Reality Show	The Voice Indonesia	Won
