= The Voice Indonesia season 1 =

The Voice Indonesia
- Season 1
- Hosted by: Darius Sinathrya; Fenita Arie; Conchita Caroline
- Judges: Glenn Fredly; Armand Maulana; Giring Ganesha; Sherina Munaf
- Winner: Billy Simpson
- Winning coach: Giring Ganesha
- Runner-up: Leona Dwi Untari
- Finals venue: Studio 5 Indosiar

Release
- Original network: Indosiar
- Original release: February 10 – June 2, 2013

Season chronology
- Next → Season 2

The Voice Indonesia (season 1) is an Indonesian reality talent show that premiered on 10 February on Indosiar. Based on the reality singing competition The Voice of Holland, the series was created by Dutch television producer John de Mol. It is part of an international series. The show was cancelled after the season ended due to poor ratings, but was revived in 2016 after RCTI acquired the rights through meetings with show creator John de Mol.

== Team ==
Color Key

- Winner
- Runner-up
- Third place
- Fourth place
- Eliminated in the Live Shows
- Eliminated in the Playoffs
- Eliminated in the Battle rounds

Coaches	Top 58 artists				
Armand Maulana					
Armand Maulana	Leona Dwi	Ferdinand Pardosi	Al Fattah	Dian Permata	Arro
Armand Maulana	Roni Satria	Renda Tribowo	Dony Irawan	Lince Marta	Sefrain Harianja
Armand Maulana	Sherly Oktaviani	Tofan Phasupat	Vania Febryn	Yerri Adam	
Sherina Munaf					
Sherina Munaf	Agsesia Galuh	Pritta Kartika	Santi Danametta	Rizky Inggar	Fredy Lona
Sherina Munaf	Rebecca Louis	Yusri Dinuth	Dilla Darmaja	Eka Asmini	Irsan Mustafa
Sherina Munaf	Karieleson	M. Bayu	Rahmad Budi	Yolanda Theodora	
Glenn Fredly					
Glenn Fredly	Tiara Degrasia	Saptoto Nugroho	Monika Yulianti	Gilbert Pohan	Desy Agustina
Glenn Fredly	Eik Montecarlo	Stevie Krisnata	Agnes Ovilia	Bellia Ulfa	Debby Maroni
Glenn Fredly	Novan Hardison	Saenab	Saud Purba	Tito Triandy	Yunita Rahman
Giring Ganesha					
Giring Ganesha	Billy Simpson	Abdi Siahaan	Luise Aminah	Ayu Nanda	Arden Purwanto
Giring Ganesha	Lilian Rumapea	Grevi Widiani	Andreas Galih	Branta Rahardinata	Eka Septiani
Giring Ganesha	Joddy Setiawan	Karina Sagita	Rinrin Reza	Syam Halim	Thomas Vincen

== First phase: blind auditions ==
Colour key

✔	Coach hit his/her "I WANT YOU" button
	Artist defaulted to this coach's team
	Artist elected to join this coach's team
	Artist eliminated with no coach pressing his or her "I WANT YOU" button

=== Episode 1: February 10, 2013 ===
Order	Artist	Age	Hometown	Song	Coach's and contestant's choices			
Order	Artist	Age	Hometown	Song	Armand	Sherina	Glenn	Giring
1	Yunita Rahman	21	Bandung	"Mercy"	✔	✔	✔	✔
2	Saptoto Nugroho	28	Yogyakarta	"Tombo Ati" & "Lir-Ilir"	✔	✔	✔	✔
3	Mickey Octavatika	33	Jakarta	"Kiss From a Rose"	–	–	–	–
4	Agseisa Galuh	19	Banjarmasin	"Bimbi"	✔	✔	–	✔
5	Lettu Yoshua	28	Bandung	"You Raise Me Up"	–	–	–	–
6	Billy Simpson	25	Jakarta	"One"	✔	✔	✔	✔
7	Abdi Siahaan	34	Jakarta	"Malam Biru"	✔	–	–	✔
8	Eka Asmini	25	Bandung	"Karena Ku Sanggup"	✔	✔	✔	✔
9	Lince Marta	37	Jakarta	"Oh! Darling"	✔	–	–	✔

=== Episode 2: February 17, 2013 ===
Order	Artist	Age	Hometown	Song	Coach's and contestant's choices			
Order	Artist	Age	Hometown	Song	Armand	Sherina	Glenn	Giring
1	Pritta Kartika	28	Surabaya	"50 Tahun Lagi"	✔	✔	✔	✔
2	Gilbert Pohan	31	Yogyakarta	"You Give Me Something"	✔	✔	✔	✔
3	Ferdinand Pardosi	31	Jakarta	"Waiting in Vain"	✔	–	✔	✔
4	Erik Ketut	28	Bali	"Tak Pernah Padam"	–	–	–	–
5	Rahmad Budi	33	Yogyakarta	"Terlalu Manis"	–	✔	–	–
6	Dian Permata	40	Surabaya	"Stormy Monday Blues"	✔	✔	✔	✔
7	Thomas Vincen	23	Yogyakarta	"Juwita Malam"	✔	–	–	✔
8	Fadly Irawan	33	Surabaya	"Januari"	–	–	–	–
9	Dilla Darmaja	32	Makassar	"Give Me One Reason"	–	✔	–	✔
10	Dony Irawan	35	Bandung	"You Make My World So Colorful"	✔	✔	–	–
11	Eik Montecarlo	23	Bandung	"Cinta"	✔	✔	✔	✔

=== Episode 3: February 24, 2013 ===
Order	Artist	Age	Hometown	Song	Coach's and contestant's choices			
Order	Artist	Age	Hometown	Song	Armand	Sherina	Glenn	Giring
1	Arro	23	Jakarta	"Save the Last Dance for Me"	✔	–	✔	✔
2	Karina Sagita	28	Jakarta	"From This Moment On"	–	–	–	✔
3	Arya	34	Jakarta	"Billie Jean"	–	–	–	–
4	Stevie Krisnata	36	Surabaya	"Kaulah Segalanya"	–	–	✔	–
5	Tofan Phasupat	27	Yogyakarta	"End of the Rainbow"	✔	–	–	✔
6	Rebecca Louis	19	Jakarta	"Selalu Cinta"	–	✔	–	–
7	Ganesh	18	Bandung	"Terdiam"	–	–	–	–
8	Karieleson	31	Surabaya	"I Feel Good"	–	✔	✔	–
9	Joddy Setiawan	21	Surabaya	"Bukannya Aku Takut"	–	–	–	✔
10	Desy Agustina	32	Surabaya	"L-O-V-E"	✔	✔	✔	✔
11	Novan Hardison	27	Surabaya	"Route 66"	–	✔	✔	✔
12	Debby Maroni	31	Makassar	"Tendangan Dari Langit"	–	–	✔	–

=== Episode 4: March 3, 2013 ===
Order	Artist	Age	Hometown	Song	Coach's and contestant's choices			
Order	Artist	Age	Hometown	Song	Armand	Sherina	Glenn	Giring
1	Bellia Ulfa	19	Jakarta	"Televisi"	✔	–	✔	✔
2	Irsan Mustafa	33	Makassar	"Thank You For Loving Me"	–	✔	–	✔
3	Muh. Fauzan	22	Bandung	"Kehilangan"	–	–	–	–
4	Arden Purwanto	29	Surabaya	"Just The Way You Are"	–	–	–	✔
5	Fredy Lona	23	Surabaya	"Lulu dan Siti"	–	✔	–	–
6	Yerri Adam	30	Surabaya	"Sometimes When We Touch"	✔	–	–	✔
7	Vania Febryn	17	Jakarta	"Don't Know Why"	✔	–	–	–
8	Lilian Rumapea	34	Bandung	"Have Fun, Go Mad"	–	✔	–	✔
9	Randy	19	Bandung	"Terima Kasih Cinta"	–	–	–	–
10	Tiara Degrasia	27	Surabaya	"Price Tag"	✔	–	✔	✔
11	Tito Triandy	27	Makassar	"Menghujam Jantungku"	–	–	✔	✔
12	Luise Aminah	23	Yogyakarta	"I Can't Make You Love Me"	–	✔	–	✔
13	Ayu Nanda	18	Jakarta	"Karena Ku Sanggup"	–	–	–	✔
14	Yolanda Theodora	27	Jakarta	"Ku Yakin Cinta"	–	✔	–	–

=== Episode 5: March 10, 2013 ===
Order	Artist	Age	Hometown	Song	Coach's and contestant's choices			
Order	Artist	Age	Hometown	Song	Armand	Sherina	Glenn	Giring
1	Leona Dwi	17	Surabaya	"I Have Nothing"	✔	✔	✔	✔
2	Santi Danametta	30	Jakarta	"Love On Top"	–	✔	–	–
3	Monika Yulianti	25	Jakarta	"Angel"	✔	–	✔	✔
4	Roni Satria	27	Jakarta	"Grenade"	✔	–	✔	–
5	Anthens	23	Jakarta	"Amazing Grace"	–	–	–	–
6	Rendra Tribowo	29	Yogyakarta	"Fix You"	✔	–	–	✔
7	Grevi Widiani	19	Bandung	"Broken Vow"	–	–	–	✔
8	Branta Rahardinata	27	Jakarta	"Aku Milikmu"	–	–	–	✔
9	Rinrin Reza	19	Bandung	"Rindu"	–	–	–	✔
10	Saenab	33	Jakarta	"Am I The Same Girl"	–	–	✔	–
11	Intan Karim	19	Bandung	"The Power of Love"	–	–	–	–
12	Yusri Dinuth	22	Jakarta	"Keong Racun"	–	✔	–	–
13	Sefrain Harianja	25	Bandung	"Feel"	✔	✔	–	–
14	Rizky Inggar	27	Jakarta	"Bayang-Bayang Ilusi"	–	✔	–	–

=== Episode 6: March 17, 2013 ===
Order	Artist	Age	Hometown	Song	Coach's and contestant's choices			
Order	Artist	Age	Hometown	Song	Armand	Sherina	Glenn	Giring
1	Syam Halim	27	Bandung	"Superman (It's Not Easy)"	✔	–	✔	✔
2	Eka Septiani	31	Yogyakarta	"Come Away With Me"	–	–	–	✔
3	Muhammad Bayu	25	Yogyakarta	"Bermain Musik"	–	✔	–	–
4	Andreas Galih	24	Surabaya	"Don't Sleep Away"	–	–	–	✔
5	Saud Purba	21	Jakarta	"Nuansa Bening"	–	–	✔	Team full
6	Agnes Ovilia	17	Jakarta	"Risalah Hati"	✔	–	Team full	Team full
7	Sherly Oktiviani	33	Jakarta	"New York, New York"	✔	–	Team full	Team full
8	Yanwar	19	Bandung	"I Love The Way You Love Me"	–	–	Team full	Team full
9	Al Fattah	34	Jakarta	"She's Gone"	✔	–	Team full	Team full

== Second phase: battle rounds ==
The battle rounds were filmed in Studio 5 Indosiar on February 24, 2013. The first two-hour episode was broadcast on March 24, 2013. After the Blind Auditions, each coach had 14 (Armand Maulana and Sherina Munaf) or 15 (Glenn Fredly and Giring Ganesha) contestants for the Battle Rounds, which aired from March 24 to April 21. Coaches began narrowing down the playing field by training the contestants with the help of "trusted advisors". Each episode featured battles consisting of pairings from within each team, and each battle concluded with the respective coach eliminating one or two of the two or three contestants. Each coach has also picked an assistant. Armand Maulana has picked Once Mekel, Sherina Munaf has chosen Vina Panduwinata, Glenn Fredly is assisted by Ello, and Giring Ganesha by Titi DJ.

Color key:

Artist won the Battle
Artist lost the Battle and was eliminated

Episode	Coach	Order	Winner	Song	Loser
Episode 7 (March 24)	Armand	1	Dian Permata	"Tolong Bu Dokter"	Lince Marta
Episode 7 (March 24)	Sherina	2	Rizky Inggar	"Beat It"	Karieleson
Episode 7 (March 24)	Glenn	3	Eik Montecarlo	"Tak Bisa Ke Lain Hati"	Saenab
Episode 7 (March 24)	Giring	4	Arden Purwanto	"Tak Pernah Padam"	Branta Rahardinata
Episode 7 (March 24)	Sherina	5	Fredy Lona	"Saat Bahagia"	Eka Asmini
Episode 7 (March 24)	Armand	6	Roni Satria	"Right Here Waiting"	Yerri Adam
Episode 8 (March 31)	Glenn	1	Saptoto Nugroho	"Jemu"	Novan Hardison
Episode 8 (March 31)	Sherina	2	Pritta Kartika	"Buktikan"	Irsan Mustafa
Episode 8 (March 31)	Giring	3	Luise Aminah	"Terjebak Nostalgia"	Eka Septiani
Episode 8 (March 31)	Armand	4	Leona Dwi	"Bahasa Kalbu"	Vania Febryn
Episode 8 (March 31)	Glenn	5	Stevie Krisnata	"Ku Tak Bisa"	Debby Maroni
Episode 8 (March 31)	Giring	6	Billy Simpson	"I Won't Give Up"	Andreas Galih
Episode 9 (April 7)	Armand	1	Ferdinand Pardosi	"Bunga"	Sefrain Harianja
Episode 9 (April 7)	Glenn	2	Monika Yulianti	"Biarlah Sendiri"	Agnes Ovilia
Episode 9 (April 7)	Sherina	3	Rebecca Louis	"Panah Asmara"	Muhammad Bayu
Episode 9 (April 7)	Giring	4	Grevi Widiani	"Andaikan Kau Datang"	Karina Sagita
Episode 9 (April 7)	Glenn	5	Desy Agustina	"Dia"	Tito Triandy
Episode 9 (April 7)	Glenn	5	Desy Agustina	"Dia"	Saud Purba
Episode 9 (April 7)	Giring	6	Abdi Siahaan	"Cemburu"	Joddy Setiawan
Episode 10 (April 14)	Glenn	1	Gilbert Pohan	"Cinta dan Sayang"	Bellia Ulfa
Episode 10 (April 14)	Armand	2	Al Fattah	"Ku Ingin"	Tofan Phasupatyrana
Episode 10 (April 14)	Sherina	3	Santi Danametta	"Love Fool"	Yolanda Theodora
Episode 10 (April 14)	Giring	4	Ayu Nanda	"Kapan Lagi Bilang I Love You"	Rinrin Reza
Episode 10 (April 14)	Armand	5	Rendra Triwibowo	"Pandangan Pertama"	Dony Irawan
Episode 10 (April 14)	Sherina	6	Agseisa Galuh	"Bento"	Rahmad Budi
Episode 11 (April 21)	Giring	1	Lilian Rumapea	"One Love (People Get Ready)"	Syam Halim
Episode 11 (April 21)	Giring	1	Lilian Rumapea	"One Love (People Get Ready)"	Thomas Vincen
Episode 11 (April 21)	Armand	2	Arro	"Melayang"	Sherly Oktiviani
Episode 11 (April 21)	Sherina	3	Yusri Dinuth	"C.I.N.T.A"	Dilla Darmanja
Episode 11 (April 21)	Glenn	4	Tiara Degrasia	"Bimbi"	Yunita Rahman

=== Sing-off ===
After the Battle Round, each coach ranks their own contestants based on Battle Round performances. The contestants who get 6th and 7th placed will head to head in sing-off rounds, singing their Blind Audition song, back to back, and concluded with the respective coach eliminating one of the two contestants; the winners will join the other contestants and advance to live show.

Color key:

Artist advances to the Live shows
Artist was eliminated

Coach	Order	Song	Artists		Song
Armand Maulana	1	"She's Gone"	Al Fattah	Rendra Triwibowo	"Fix You"
Sherina Munaf	2	"Selalu Cinta"	Rebecca Louis	Yusri Dinuth	"Keong Racun"
Giring Ganesha	3	"Broken Vow"	Grevi Widiani	Ayu Nanda	"Karena Ku Sanggup"
Glenn Fredly	4	"Kaulah Segalanya"	Stevie Krisnata	Saptoto Nugroho	"Tombo Ati" & "Lir-Ilir"

== Third phase: live shows ==
=== Live show details ===
Color keys

Artist was saved by the public's vote
Artist was saved by his/her coach
Artist was eliminated

=== Episode 12: live rounds, week 1 ===
Episode	Order	Coach	Artist	Song	Result
Episode 12 (Sunday, April 28, 2013)
Episode 12 (Sunday, April 28, 2013)	1	Sherina M.	Agseisa Galuh	"Pupus"	Public's vote
Episode 12 (Sunday, April 28, 2013)	2	Sherina M.	Santi Danametta	"If I Were A Boy"	Sherina's choice
Episode 12 (Sunday, April 28, 2013)	3	Sherina M.	Fredy Lona	"Summertime"	Eliminated
Episode 12 (Sunday, April 28, 2013)	4	Glenn F.	Gilbert Pohan	"Kala Cinta Menggoda"	Glenn's choice
Episode 12 (Sunday, April 28, 2013)	5	Glenn F.	Tiara Degrasia	"Tak Ada Logika"	Public's vote
Episode 12 (Sunday, April 28, 2013)	6	Glenn F.	Desy Agustina	"Tak Kuduga"	Eliminated
Episode 12 (Sunday, April 28, 2013)	7	Giring G.	Arden Purwanto	"Roxanne"	Eliminated
Episode 12 (Sunday, April 28, 2013)	8	Giring G.	Ayu Nanda	"Mencintaimu"	Public's vote
Episode 12 (Sunday, April 28, 2013)	9	Giring G.	Billy Simpson	"Beautiful"	Giring's choice
Episode 12 (Sunday, April 28, 2013)	10	Armand M.	Al Fattah	"Takkan Pernah Ada"	Public's vote
Episode 12 (Sunday, April 28, 2013)	11	Armand M.	Arro	"Ada Apa Denganmu"	Eliminated
Episode 12 (Sunday, April 28, 2013)	12	Armand M.	Dian Permata	"Kompor Meleduk"	Armand's choice

Non-competition performances
Order	Performers	Song
1	The Voice Indonesia coaches	"Meraih Mimpi"

=== Episode 13: live rounds, week 2 ===
Guest Performance by Sandhy Sondoro ("Malam Biru")

Episode	Order	Coach	Artist	Song	Result
Episode 13 (Sunday, May 5, 2013)
Episode 13 (Sunday, May 5, 2013)	1	Glenn F.	Eik Montecarlo	"Zakia"	Eliminated
Episode 13 (Sunday, May 5, 2013)	2	Glenn F.	Saptoto Nugroho	"Yang Terlupakan"	Public's vote
Episode 13 (Sunday, May 5, 2013)	3	Glenn F.	Monika Yulianti	"Kasih Putih"	Glenn's choice
Episode 13 (Sunday, May 5, 2013)	4	Giring G.	Luise Aminah	"Titanium"	Public's vote
Episode 13 (Sunday, May 5, 2013)	5	Giring G.	Lilian Rumapea	"Nakal"	Eliminated
Episode 13 (Sunday, May 5, 2013)	6	Giring G.	Abdi Siahaan	"Bohemian Rhapsody"	Giring's choice
Episode 13 (Sunday, May 5, 2013)	7	Armand M.	Ferdinand Pardosi	"Love of My Life"	Armand's choice
Episode 13 (Sunday, May 5, 2013)	8	Armand M.	Roni Satria	"Could It Be"	Eliminated
Episode 13 (Sunday, May 5, 2013)	9	Armand M.	Leona Dwi	"To Love You More"	Public's Vote
Episode 13 (Sunday, May 5, 2013)	10	Sherina M.	Rebecca Louis	"Moving On"	Eliminated
Episode 13 (Sunday, May 5, 2013)	11	Sherina M.	Pritta Kartika	"I Surrender"	Public's vote
Episode 13 (Sunday, May 5, 2013)	12	Sherina M.	Rizky Inggar	"Rehab"	Sherina's choice

=== Episode 14: live rounds, week 3 ===
Episode	Order	Coach	Artist	Song	Result
Episode 14 (Sunday, May 12, 2013)
Episode 14 (Sunday, May 12, 2013)	1	Giring G.	Abdi Siahaan	"Simphony Yang Indah"	Public's vote
Episode 14 (Sunday, May 12, 2013)	2	Giring G.	Billy Simpson	"Cobalah Mengerti"	Public's vote
Episode 14 (Sunday, May 12, 2013)	3	Giring G.	Ayu Nanda	"Matahariku"	Eliminated
Episode 14 (Sunday, May 12, 2013)	4	Giring G.	Luise Aminah	"Jadi Milikmu (Crazy)"	Giring's choice
Episode 14 (Sunday, May 12, 2013)	5	Glenn F.	Monika Yulianti	"Serba Salah"	Public's vote
Episode 14 (Sunday, May 12, 2013)	6	Glenn F.	Gilbert Pohan	"Itu Aku"	Eliminated
Episode 14 (Sunday, May 12, 2013)	7	Glenn F.	Saptoto Nugroho	"Mahadewi"	Glenn's choice
Episode 14 (Sunday, May 12, 2013)	8	Glenn F.	Tiara Degrasia	"Cinta Takkan Usai"	Public's vote
Episode 14 (Sunday, May 12, 2013)	9	Armand M.	Dian Permata	"Walk"	Eliminated
Episode 14 (Sunday, May 12, 2013)	10	Armand M.	Leona Dwi	"Listen"	Public's vote
Episode 14 (Sunday, May 12, 2013)	11	Armand M.	Al Fattah	"Don't Stop Believin'"	Armand's choice
Episode 14 (Sunday, May 12, 2013)	12	Armand M.	Ferdinand Pardosi	"Mr. Brightside"	Public's vote
Episode 14 (Sunday, May 12, 2013)	13	Sherina M.	Pritta Kartika	"Cinta Pertama dan Terakhir"	Public's vote
Episode 14 (Sunday, May 12, 2013)	14	Sherina M.	Rizky Inggar	"Tua-Tua Keladi"	Eliminated
Episode 14 (Sunday, May 12, 2013)	15	Sherina M.	Santi Danametta	"Wonder Woman"	Sherina's choice
Episode 14 (Sunday, May 12, 2013)	16	Sherina M.	Agseisa Galuh	"I'm With You"	Public's vote

=== Episode 15: live rounds, week 4 ===
Episode	Order	Coach	Artist	Song	Result
Episode 15 (Sunday, May 19, 2013)
Episode 15 (Sunday, May 19, 2013)	1	Glenn F.	Saptoto Nugroho	"Bukan Permainan"	Public's vote
Episode 15 (Sunday, May 19, 2013)	2	Armand M.	Leona Dwi	"Kini"	Public's vote
Episode 15 (Sunday, May 19, 2013)	3	Sherina M.	Santi Danametta	"Come Together"	Eliminated
Episode 15 (Sunday, May 19, 2013)	4	Giring G.	Abdi Siahaan	"Man In The Mirror"	Giring's choice
Episode 15 (Sunday, May 19, 2013)	5	Sherina M.	Agseisa Galuh	"Bete"	Sherina's choice
Episode 15 (Sunday, May 19, 2013)	6	Armand M.	Ferdinand Pardosi	"Merindukanmu" & "Sudah"	Armand's choice
Episode 15 (Sunday, May 19, 2013)	7	Glenn F.	Tiara Degrasia	"Putri Panggung"	Glenn's choice
Episode 15 (Sunday, May 19, 2013)	8	Giring G.	Luise Aminah	"I Will Always Love You"	Eliminated
Episode 15 (Sunday, May 19, 2013)	9	Giring G.	Billy Simpson	"Beautiful Day"	Public's vote
Episode 15 (Sunday, May 19, 2013)	10	Armand M.	Al Fattah	"Always"	Eliminated
Episode 15 (Sunday, May 19, 2013)	11	Glenn F.	Monika Yulianti	"Cinta Satu Malam"	Eliminated
Episode 15 (Sunday, May 19, 2013)	12	Sherina M.	Pritta Kartika	"Firework"	Public's vote

Note

- Due to health issues, Sherina Munaf was absent during the episode. Vina Panduwinata replaced her as a commenter but the decision was made by Sherina.

=== Episode 16: live rounds, semi-final ===
Episode	Order	Coach	Artist	Song	Result
Episode 16 (Sunday, May 26, 2013)
Episode 16 (Sunday, May 26, 2013)	1	Sherina M.	Pritta Kartika	"I Love You"	Eliminated
Episode 16 (Sunday, May 26, 2013)	2	Giring G.	Abdi Siahaan	"We Are Young"	Eliminated
Episode 16 (Sunday, May 26, 2013)	3	Armand M.	Ferdinand Pardosi	"Bukan Untukku"	Eliminated
Episode 16 (Sunday, May 26, 2013)	4	Glenn F.	Tiara Degrasia	"Bebas"	Advanced
Episode 16 (Sunday, May 26, 2013)	5	Armand M.	Leona Dwi	"Aku Wanita"	Advanced
Episode 16 (Sunday, May 26, 2013)	6	Sherina M.	Agseisa Galuh	"L.O.V.E"	Advanced
Episode 16 (Sunday, May 26, 2013)	7	Giring G.	Billy Simpson	"Fix You"	Advanced
Episode 16 (Sunday, May 26, 2013)	8	Glenn F.	Saptoto Nugroho	"Yogyakarta"	Eliminated

Non-competition performances
Order	Performers	Song
1	Team Sherina (Agseisa Galuh Putri and Pritta Kartika)	"Locked Out of Heaven"
2	Armand Maulana & his finalists (Ferdinand Pardosi and Leona Dwi Untari)	"Nakal"
3	Glenn Fredly & his finalists (Saptoto Nugroho and Tiara Degrasia)	"Warna"
4	Giring Ganesha & his finalists (Abdi Siahaan and Billy Simpson)	"Without You"

=== Episode 17: live rounds, final ===
The live performance show and result show aired on Sunday, June 2, 2013. Guest Performance by Noah ("Jika Engkau")

Coach	Artist	Order	First solo song	Order	Second solo song	Order	Duet song	Result
Giring G.	Billy Simpson	1	"Laskar Pelangi"	5	"When I Was Your Man"	12	"Dia Dia Dia"	Winner
Armand M.	Leona Dwi	3	"Yesterday"	6	"Sang Dewi"	9	"Only Girl (In The World)"	Runner-up
Glenn F.	Tiara Degrasia	4	"Ya Sudahlah"	8	"Malaikat Juga Tahu"	11	"Menghujam Jantungku"	Third/Fourth place
Sherina M.	Agseisa Galuh	2	"Makhluk Tuhan Paling Seksi	7	"Just Give Me a Reason"	10	"Aku Yang Tersakiti"	Third/Fourth place

Non-competition performances
Order	Performers	Song
1	Noah (with Agseisa Galuh Putri, Billy Simpson, Leona Dwi Untari, and Tiara Degrasia)	"Separuh Aku"

== Elimination chart ==
Color key

- Artist from Team Armand
- Artist from Team Glenn
- Artist from Team Sherina
- Artist from Team Giring

Result details

- Winner
- Runner-up
- Third place
- Artist was saved by his/her coach
- Artist was saved by the public
- Artist was eliminated

Live show results per week
Artist	Week 1	Week 2	Week 3	Week 4	Week 5	Finals
Billy Simpson	Safe		Safe	Safe	Safe	Winner
Leona Dwi		Safe	Safe	Safe	Safe	Runner-up
Tiara Degrasia	Safe		Safe	Safe	Safe	3rd place
Agseisa Galuh	Safe		Safe	Safe	Safe	3rd place
Pritta Kartika		Safe	Safe	Safe	Eliminated	Eliminated (week 5)
Saptoto Nugroho		Safe	Safe	Safe	Eliminated	Eliminated (week 5)
Ferdinand Pardosi		Safe	Safe	Safe	Eliminated	Eliminated (week 5)
Abdi Siahaan		Safe	Safe	Safe	Eliminated	Eliminated (week 5)
Al Fattah	Safe		Safe	Eliminated	Eliminated (week 4)	
Luise Aminah		Safe	Safe	Eliminated	Eliminated (week 4)	
Monika Yulianti		Safe	Safe	Eliminated	Eliminated (week 4)	
Santi Danametta	Safe		Safe	Eliminated	Eliminated (week 4)	
Ayu Nanda	Safe		Eliminated	Eliminated (week 3)		
Dian Permata	Safe		Eliminated	Eliminated (week 3)		
Gilbert Pohan	Safe		Eliminated	Eliminated (week 3)		
Rizky Inggar		Safe	Eliminated	Eliminated (week 3)		
Eik Montecarlo		Eliminated	Eliminated (week 2)			
Lilian Rumapea		Eliminated	Eliminated (week 2)			
Rebecca Louis		Eliminated	Eliminated (week 2)			
Roni Satria		Eliminated	Eliminated (week 2)			
Arro	Eliminated	Eliminated (week 1)				
Arden Purwanto	Eliminated	Eliminated (week 1)				
Desy Agustina	Eliminated	Eliminated (week 1)				
Fredy Lona	Eliminated	Eliminated (week 1)				

Preceded by Not available	The Voice Indonesia; Season 1 (2013)	Succeeded by Season 2 (2016)
