= Yang Terbaik =

Compilation album by Ari Lasso

Greatest hits album by Ari Lasso
- Released: June 15, 2012
- Recorded: 2001–2012
- Genre: Pop, rock
- Label: Aquarius Musikindo

Ari Lasso chronology
The Best of Ari Lasso (2007)	Yang Terbaik (2012)

Singles from Yang Terbaik
- 1. "Cintailah Aku Sepenuh Hati" Released: December 2009; 2. "Satu Cinta (ft. Sandy Canester)" Released: March 2011; 3. "Karena Aku Tlah Denganmu (ft. Ariel Tatum)" Released: August 2011; 4. "Kisah Kita" Released: May 2012

Yang Terbaik is a greatest hits album by Indonesian singer Ari Lasso. It was released on June 15, 2012 by Aquarius Musikindo. The album compiled eight songs from five previous studio albums with six newest songs, "Kisah Kita", "Karena Aku Tlah Denganmu", "Cintailah Aku Sepenuh Hati", "Satu Cinta", "Doa Untuk Cinta" and "Cinta Adalah Misteri". In marketing this album, Ari and the record label working with KFC that this album would be circulated in all KFC stores in Indonesia.

== Track listing ==
No.	Title	Writer(s)	Length
1.	"Kisah Kita"	Lobow	03:25
2.	"Rahasia Perempuan"	Ahmad Dhani	03:27
3.	"Hampa"	Ricky FM	04:51
4.	"Cinta Terakhir"	Irfan Aulia	05:53
5.	"Karena Aku Tlah Denganmu (ft. Ariel Tatum)"	Teguh Deswanto	03:38
6.	"Cintailah Aku Sepenuh Hati"	Freddie Sugar	04:15
7.	"Misteri Ilahi"	Erwin Prast	03:47
8.	"Aku dan Dirimu (ft. Bunga Citra Lestari)"	Pay Burman & Dian Nebula	04:26
9.	"Satu Cinta (ft. Sandy Canester)"	Pay & Sandy C	04:20
10.	"Penjaga Hati"	Piyu	04:12
11.	"Arti Cinta"	Ricky FM	04:12
12.	"Perbedaan"	Bebi Romeo	05:09
13.	"Doa Untuk Cinta"	Teguh Deswanto	04:07
14.	"Cinta Adalah Misteri"	Ahmad Dhani & Andra	03:50
