= Ari Lasso =

Indonesian singer (born 1973)

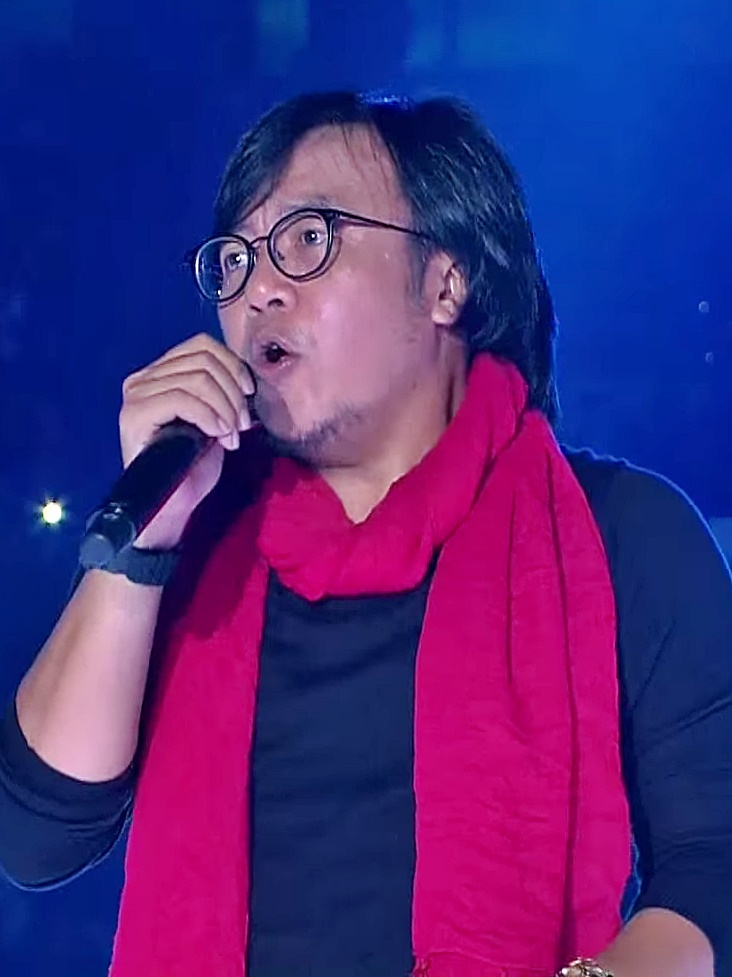
- Lasso performing in 2016
- Born: Ari Bernardus Lasso; 17 January 1973 (age 53); Madiun, East Java, Indonesia
- Education: Airlangga University (BEc)
- Occupations: Musician; singer-songwriter; actor
- Years active: 1991–present
- Musical career
- Genres: Pop, pop rock, hard rock
- Instruments: Vocals; guitar; keyboards
- Label: Aquarius Musikindo
- Formerly of: Dewa 19
- Website: http://www.a-lass.com

Ari Bernardus Lasso (born 17 January 1973) is an Indonesian singer, songwriter, musician, and former lead vocalist of Dewa 19.

== Biography ==
Lasso was born in Madiun, East Java on 17 January 1973 to Bartholomeus B. Lasso and Sri Noerhida. His mother told him that he could become a famous singer, saying that "[his] life should be beautiful" because of his voice. While attending high school at SMA Negeri 2 Surabaya, he established the Outsider Band along with the drummer Wawan Juniarso, from Dewa 19, and guitarist Piyu of Padi. After graduating from high school, he attended Airlangga University and earned a degree in economics.

Lasso eventually became a member of Dewa 19 together with Wawan Juniarson, Andra Junaidi, Ahmad Dhani, and Erwin Prasetya. With Dewa 19, he released the album Kangen, which was chosen as the best album of the year by BASF in 1993.

Beginning after Dewa 19's third album, Lasso used drugs heavily; his drug addiction led to his personal decision to resign from the band in 2001. To overcome his addiction, he tried going to rehab and alternative medicine; he was also hospitalized and put under isolation at home. All of these efforts were to no avail. After promising his dying mother that he would beat his addiction, he became more adamant in attempting to recover, eventually succeeding. He also quit his 20-year habit of smoking in 2010, after his son began taking and destroying his cigarettes.

After his dismissal from Dewa 19, Lasso became a solo singer. He released his first solo album, the commercially successful Sendiri Dulu, that year which sold over 500,000 copies. Two years later, he released his most successful album Keseimbangan, which featured two songs performed with Dhani. This album sold more than 800,000 copies. In 2004 he released Kulihat Kudengar dan Kurasakan, of which two songs became used for the movie Mengejar Matahari (Chasing the Sun). In 2006, he released the album Selalu Ada, while the following year his album The Best of included a duet with Bunga Citra Lestari.

In 2009, rumours spread that Lasso would become mute due to damage to his voice box; although he did not perform for four months during that period, he performed in a series of concerts between May and June of that year. Lasso has expressed interest in becoming a music producer if he can no longer be a singer.

In 2012, Lasso released a compilation album, Yang Terbaik. The album was only sold at KFC outlets in Indonesia. The album compiled top hit singles and six new songs, "Kisah Kita", "Karena Aku Tlah Denganmu", "Cintailah Aku Sepenuh Hati", "Satu Cinta", "Doa Untuk Cinta" and "Cinta Adalah Misteri". Lasso also includes musicians who merged his albums sold in KFC stores like Cinta Laura, Indah Dewi Pertiwi, Agnes Monica, SM*SH, T.R.I.A.D, Rossa, Slank, Last Child, Ello, Sammy Simorangkir, Armada and Ungu.

In 2016, Ari Lasso joined the judging panel of season 2 of The Voice Indonesia.

In 2021, Lasso was diagnosed with DLBCL (Diffuse large B-cell lymphoma) cancer so he had to undergo chemotherapy. In July 2022, Lasso announced that his treatment had ended.

== Personal life ==
When not busy with music, Lasso tries to participate in his children's lives, assisting with their homework and attending school performances. Lasso has noted that Mitch Albom's The Five People You Meet in Heaven has influenced his parenting style and belief that a parent's interest in their children's lives can be a large influence.

== Discography ==
With Dewa 19

- Dewa 19 (1992)
- Format Masa Depan (Future Format, 1994)
- Terbaik (The Best, 1995)
- Pandawa Lima (Five Heroes (1997)

Solo

- Sendiri Dulu (Alone for Now; 2001)
- Keseimbangan (Equality; 2003)
- Kulihat Kudengar dan Kurasakan (I See, I Hear, and I Feel; 2004)
- Selalu Ada (Always There; 2006)
- The Best of (2007)
- Yang Terbaik (The Best; 2012).

== See also ==
- Ahmad Dhani
