= Gloria Jessica =

Indonesian singer-songwriter

- Born: Gloria Jessica Ulima Gultom; 25 June 1994 (age 32); Jakarta, Indonesia
- Genres: Pop; Jazz
- Occupation: Singer
- Instruments: Vocal, Piano, Guitar, Ukulele
- Years active: 2016–present
- Label: Universal Music Indonesia

Gloria Jessica (née Gultom; born 25 June 1994) is an Indonesian singer-songwriter of Batak descent. She was one of the contestants of the second season of The Voice Indonesia (2016), broadcast by the national television station RCTI. She started gaining public attention after performing her rendition of Coldplay's "A Sky Full of Stars" in the knockout round of the singing contest. On YouTube, the video of the performance made its way to the very top of nationally "trending" videos and held its position there for more than a week. In the same year, she signed with Universal Music Indonesia. Her fifth single, "Hold On", is the first one fully in English and written by herself in collaboration with Joseph Saryuf of Santamonica and Direct Action. "Buka Mata", released in 2019, is also a product of their collaboration. The following year saw Gloria working with American musicians Kyle Patrick and Jesse Ruben, resulting in the single "Still Worth Loving". In 2021, "Berlalu" was released. The song was produced by a trio of prominent Indonesian musicians/producers: Widi Puradiredja of Maliq & D'Essentials, Kimo Rizky of Kimokal, and Joseph Saryuf.

Gloria received the award for "Best New Artiste (Female)" in the 2017 edition of Anugerah Planet Muzik, an event appreciating Malay musicians from Malaysia, Singapore, and Indonesia. Two of her singles have been nominated in Anugerah Musik Indonesia, the Indonesian version of the Grammy Awards.

== Performances on The Voice Indonesia 2016 ==
– The performance gained more than 1 million views on Youtube in a week
– The performance was one of "5 amazing knockout performances" on The Voice Global

Theme	Song	Original Singer	Order	result
The Blind Audition	"I'm Not Your Toy"	La Roux	9	Safe
The Battle	"I'll Stand By You" vs Intan Rahayuning	The Pretenders	6	Safe
Knockout	"A Sky Full of Stars"	Coldplay	11	Safe
Live Shows 1 (Top 24)	"Immortal Love Song"	Mahadewa	3	Safe
Playoff 1 (Top 16)	"Habits (Stay High)"	Tove Lo	11	Safe
Playoff 2 (Top 12)	"Selepas Kau Pergi"	La Luna	12	Safe
Semi Final (Top 8)	"All I Want"	Kodaline	7	Elimination

== Discography ==
=== Singles ===
- Dia Tak Cinta Kamu (2016)
- I Just Wanna Love You (2017)
- Setia (2018)
- Luka yang Kecil (2018)
- Hold On (2018)
- Buka Mata (2019)
- Still Worth Loving (2020)
- Berlalu (2021)
- What Are We Now? (2023)
- Lullaby (2025, with RIMALDI)
- Nuansa Romansa (2025, with Danar)
- Guess Not (2025, with Winky Wiryawan)
- Kanvas Abadi (2025, with kidunghara)
- Mother Angels (2025, with Maeve)

== Awards and nominations ==
=== Anugerah Musik Indonesia ===
Anugerah Musik Indonesia (translation: Indonesian Music Awards) is an annual Indonesian music award equivalent to Grammy Awards or Brit Awards. The award was formalized in 1997 by ASIRI (Association of Indonesia Recording Industry), PAPPRI (Association of Indonesian Singers, Songwriters and Music Record Producers), and KCI (Copyright Office of Indonesia).

Year	Nominee / work	Award	Result
2017	"Dia Tak Cinta Kamu"	Best Newcomer	Nominated

=== Anugerah Planet Muzik ===
Anugerah Planet Muzik is an annual awards ceremony appreciating Malay musicians from Indonesia, Singapore, and Malaysia.

Year	Nominee / work	Award	Result
2017	"Dia Tak Cinta Kamu"	Best New Artiste (Female)	Won

=== Dahsyatnya Awards ===
Dahsyatnya Awards is an annual awards ceremony presented by the daily Indonesian TV show Dahsyat, which is broadcast by RCTI, one of Indonesia's biggest & oldest TV channels.

Year	Recipient/Nominated work	Award	Result
2018	Gloria Jessica	Outstanding Newcomer	Pending
