= Daniel Mananta =

Indonesian actor

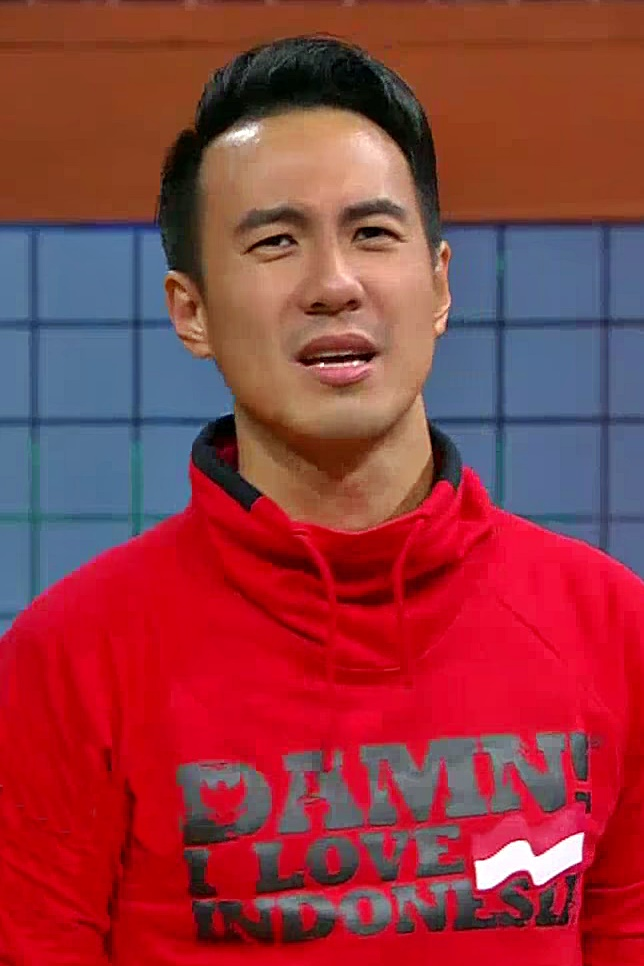
- Born: August 14, 1981 (age 44); Jakarta, Indonesia
- Occupations: Celebrity, Presenter, VJ, Podcaster
- Spouse: Viola Maria (m. 2011)
- Children: Mila Mananta; Noam Mananta
- Parent(s): Donny Mananta (father); Anawaty Angkasa (mother)
- Website: Daniel Mananta Homepage

Daniel Mananta (born in Jakarta, Indonesia, on 14 August 1981) is an Indonesian actor, presenter, VJ, and podcaster of Chinese Indonesian descent. He is an Indonesian entertainer whose name emerged after winning the 2003 MTV Indonesia VJ Hunt; thus, he was popularly known as VJ Daniel Mananta. He has now established himself as an entertainer as well as a young entrepreneur.

== Early life ==
Daniel Mananta led an amiable childhood in Jakarta, Indonesia. He attended Tarakanita IV in Pluit, North Jakarta, from kindergarten to the end of junior high school. Daniel Mananta moved to Perth, Australia, to complete his high school education at Aquinas College. His childhood is rarely a topic of discussion, as he felt he was socially awkward until after high school. Daniel Mananta has one brother, William Mananta.

=== Life in Perth, Australia ===
During his school years in Perth, Daniel Mananta took up part-time employment at Nando's, first as a waiter and eventually attained a higher position equivalent to assistant manager. However, as high school final exams approached, he left the part-time job to focus on his education.

Following graduation from Aquinas College, Daniel Mananta pursued a double degree: Bachelor of Business Administration majoring in Finance and International Business at Edith Cowan University. He graduated in 2002 at the age of 20.

While looking for an opportunity in Perth as a fresh graduate for 6 months, Daniel Mananta was involved in Network 21, a multi-level marketing system selling Amway products. As he was doing business presentations on almost a daily basis, Daniel Mananta began to enjoy public speaking. He also interned at Citibank Australia for 3 weeks.

== Career ==
=== Early career ===
Missing his homeland, Daniel Mananta returned to Jakarta at the end of 2002. He worked with his father, who owned a store in Mangga Dua, Jakarta. Mangga Dua itself is a gargantuan shopping hub in the capital city. Unfortunately, the work was not something Daniel Mananta enjoyed, and then he left in early 2003.

At around the same time, MTV Indonesia launched the MTV VJ Hunt 2003 event. Daniel Mananta tried his luck and entered the contest, proceeded to become a finalist from 6000 contestants and ultimately emerged as the winner of the VJ Hunt.

Soon, Daniel Mananta became a familiar face. In 2004, he hosted the Red Carpet MTV Asia Awards. During his time as an MTV VJ, he has interviewed some of the biggest names in international music - Korn, Linkin Park, Avril Lavigne, The Black Eyed Peas, Gareth Gates, Michelle Branch and Nicole Scherzinger, to name but a few.

Daniel Mananta also became ambassador for several products, including Sony Ericsson and Adidas Indonesia.

=== Acting and singing ===
In 2007, Daniel Mananta landed the lead role in I Love you Boss, an FTV produced by MNC pictures. He also starred in a soap opera produced by Sinemart, titled Antara Cinta dan Dusta (Between Love and Lies).

Daniel Mananta scored an opportunity to grace the big screen as Jimmie in the thriller Rumah Dara (Macabre) in 2009 alongside Shareefa Danish, Julie Estelle, Arifin Putra, Sigi Wimala and others. Macabre, which was directed by The Mo Brothers, was also released in international film markets.

In 2011, Daniel Mananta recorded a song with the band Potenzio, titled Twitter Dunia (World Twitter). In the song, Daniel Mananta raps. He admitted to being a little less confident about singing but enjoys rapping, as it is similar to presenting but with faster articulation of words.

=== Presenter ===
Daniel Mananta hosted the third season of Indonesian Idol in 2006. The first time he hosted the popular competition, he appeared alongside Ata. His work as an MTV VJ continued as per usual.

Daniel and Ata returned as the hosts of Indonesian Idol the following year. In 2008, Daniel Mananta was paired with Dewi Sandra, an Indonesian singer, to host the fifth season of Indonesian Idol. In the sixth and seventh seasons of Indonesian Idol (2010 and 2012 respectively), Daniel was entrusted to lead the show independently.

The seasoned presenter also hosted Asian Idol in 2007, which was screened in six countries; India, Indonesia, Malaysia, the Philippines, Singapore and Vietnam. He also hosted the show Anugerah Planet Muzik 2011, shown in Indonesia, Malaysia and Singapore. In 2016, he hosted the second season of The Voice Indonesia.

== DaMN ==
=== DaMN! I Love Indonesia ===
In 2008, Daniel Mananta launched his own clothing line on 28 October - a day commemorated as Youth Pledge Day in Indonesia. The brand, “DAMN! I Love Indonesia”, aims to remind people of Indonesia’s culture. “DAMN” is derived from his name - DAniel MaNanta.

After living in Australia for seven years, Daniel Mananta yearned for Indonesia. During his time abroad, he noted that some Indonesians living in other countries did not openly expressed a connection to their home country.. Thus, he was moved to create “DAMN! I Love Indonesia”. Comprising T-shirts, polo shirts, button up shirts, shorts, hats, and belts, the collection reflects a love of Indonesian culture.

Each “DAMN! I Love Indonesia” article carries a tag telling the story of the product in English and Bahasa Indonesia. For example, the tag on a T-shirt depicting a wayang (shadow puppet) character will bear a description about that particular character.

DAMN! I Love Indonesia first set up shop in fX shopping center in South Jakarta. In 2012, this outlet had to close down as the floor became the campus of a private educational institution.

Since 2010, DAMN! I Love Indonesia outlets can be found in Grand Indonesia Shopping Town in Jakarta and Grand City in Surabaya. In 2012, another outlet opened in Pondok Indah Mall in South Jakarta with the fifth opening in June of that year in Mal Panakukkang in Makassar.

DAMN! I Love Indonesia products can also be found online at http://www.damniloveindonesia.com.

=== DaMN Inc. ===
Daniel Mananta and a handful of partners launched DAMN.inc, an entertainment venture showcasing models as well as film and music production. Some actresses under DAMN.inc management are Wenny Vanilla and Rianti Cartwright. DAMN.inc can be accessed on www.damninc.com

== Personal life ==
According to Daniel Mananta, he started dating later than most - he had his first relationship when he was 17 years old. He was in a brief relationship with Marissa Nasution in 2008; a union that ended in the same year. There previously circulated rumours of Daniel with singers Agnes Monica and Sandra Dewi, but these remain unconfirmed.

He married Viola Maria from Germany in 2011, and since then they had 2 children.

== Filmography ==
=== Film ===
Year	Title	Role
2010	Rumah Dara	Jimmie
2018	A Man Called Ahok	Ahok
2019	Susi Susanti: Love All	Pastor
2024	Glenn Fredly the Movie	Doctor

=== TV series ===
Year	Title	Role
2006	I Love You Boss	Raffy
2011	Antara Cinta dan Dusta	Aryo/Arya
2022	What We Lose to Love	Willy

=== Producer ===
Year	Title	Role
2014	Killers	Producer
2019	Susi Susanti: Love All	Producer
2024	Glenn Fredly the Movie	Producer

=== TV commercials ===
Year	Brand
2011 - present	Honda Vario 125
2013 - present	Advan
2014	AHM OIL
2014	KYT Helmet

== Reality show ==
Year	Title	Channel Television
2016	The Voice Indonesia	RCTI
2006 - 2020	Indonesian Idol	RCTI
2015	Asia's Next Top Model (cycle 3)	STAR World

== Awards ==
In 2007, Daniel Mananta was nominated as Best Presenter in Music at the Panasonic Awards - one of three times he would be nominated at the same awards show. In 2008, he nabbed an award as Favorite Host at the Nickelodeon Kids’ Choice Awards. Daniel Mananta also won the Panasonic Gobel Awards 2013 for Favorite Talent Show Presenter category.

Year	Awards	Category	Results
2013	Panasonic Gobel Awards	Favorite Talent Show Presenter	Won
2019	Piala Maya	Best New Actor	Nominee

=== Other Achievements ===
Year	Description
2014	The judge of Indonesian Idol Junior
2014	The ambassador of KARE home interior
2013	The host of Miss World 2013
2013	The host of Mister International 2013
2013	The ambassador of Save Our Shark - WWF Indonesia
-	The ambassador for Dwidaya Tour
