= Tiara Andini =

Indonesian singer and actress (born 2001)

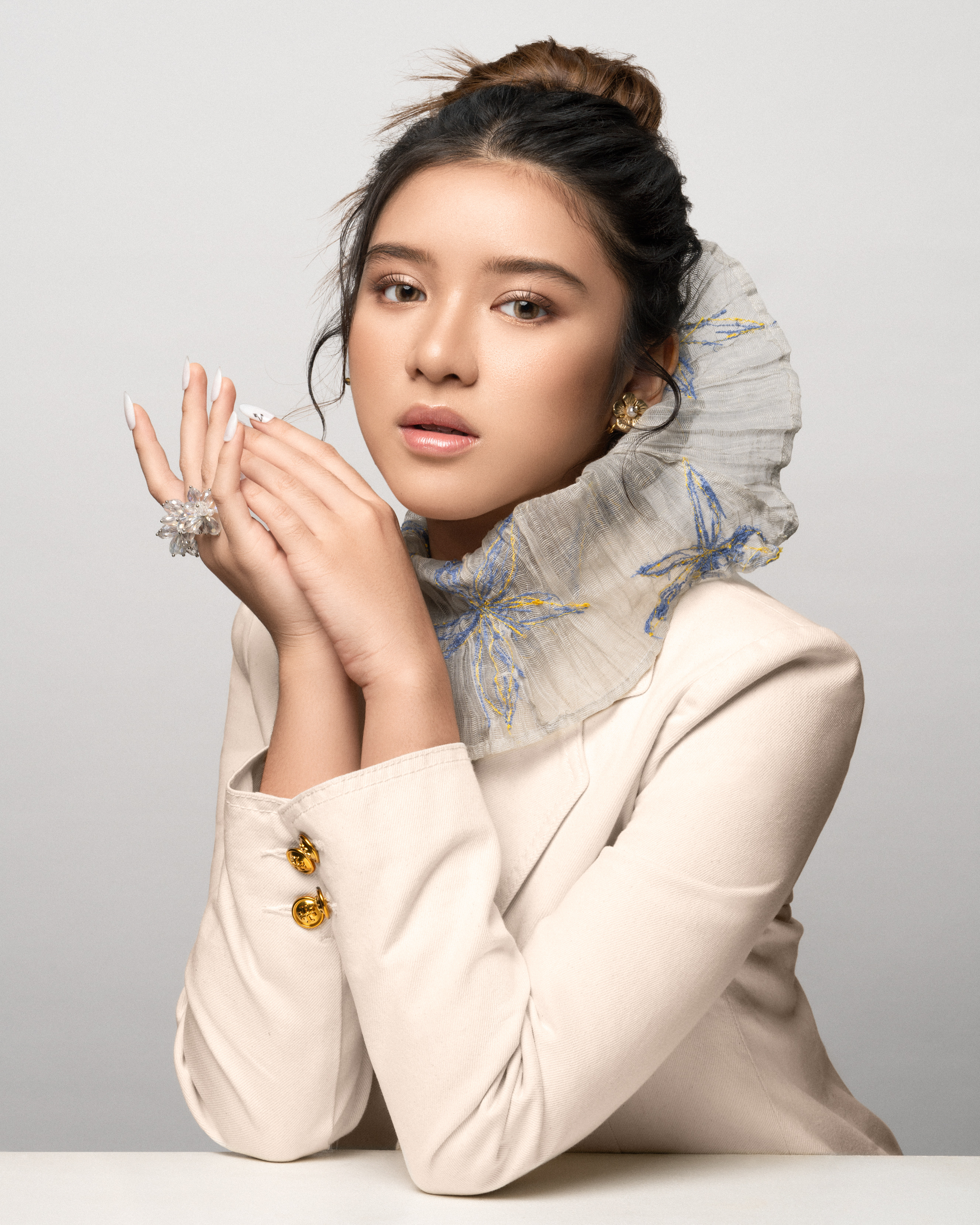
- Tiara Andini in 2021
- Born: Tiara Anugrah Eka Setyo Andini; September 23, 2001 (age 24); Jember, East Java, Indonesia
- Education: Multimedia Nusantara University
- Occupations: Singer, Presenter, Celebrity
- Years active: 2017 - present
- Known for: Music; Film; Variety show
- Awards: Full list
- Musical career
- Genres: Pop; Pop Ballad; Hip hop; Dance pop
- Instrument: Vocal
- Years active: 2020 - present
- Label: Universal Music Indonesia
- Modeling information
- Hair color: Black
- Eye color: Dark brown
- Agency: Star Media Nusantara

YouTube information
- Channel: Tiara Andini
- Subscribers: 2.65 million
- Views: 1.14 billion
- Last updated: 5 April 2025
- Tiara Andini's voice from the podcast Shelter FM Cirebon, 6 January 2021

Tiara Anugrah Eka Setyo Andini (born 23 September 2001) is an Indonesian singer and actress. She was the runner-up of the tenth season of Indonesian Idol, which was broadcast by RCTI in 2019 - 2020. In Idol, she was known as the girl who received a titanium ticket (Note: The titanium ticket is a jury's veto right to allow audition participants to enter the elimination stage after getting a small number of votes from other judges, and this veto power is only valid for one occasion.) from one of the judges. She is the only titanium ticket recipient to ever make it through to the final round in the history of Indonesian Idol. She was awarded Best Newcomer from the 23rd Anugerah Musik Indonesia Awards, and Best New Asian Artist Indonesia from the 2020 Mnet Asian Music Awards. She also won the SCTV Music Awards for two consecutive years as Most Popular Female Singer in 2022 and 2023. She was nominated for the 2023 MTV Europe Music Awards as Best Asian act and 2024 Kids' Choice Awards as Favorite Asian Act.

== Early life and education ==
Tiara Andini was born with the name Tiara Anugrah Eka Setyo Andini on 23 September 2001, in Patrang District, Jember Regency, and the eldest of three children, from couple Nugroho Ediyono Deddy and Sari Yoshida Setyoastri. Tiara Andini has a younger sister named Aurelia Anugrah and a younger brother named Holland Mauricio. Her mother is of Dutch and Japanese descent, whereas her father is Javanese. Her family is muslim. Both of her parents work in the arts as musicians: Tiara's father is a music arranger while Tiara's mother is a singer.

Due to her family's musical background, Tiara Andini was introduced to the world of music from a young age by frequently playing songs by Melly Goeslaw and Titi DJ. Tiara Andini has been interested in singing since she was in kindergarten. When she was in the 5th grade, she took vocal lessons and was directed by her vocal teacher to become a festival singer. Tiara Andini also knew various genres of music from Kroncong to Mandarin Chinese music. In her school days, her friends did not support Tiara Andini's decision to become a singer and underestimated her talent in singing. Since childhood, Tiara Andini has joined. She is an active member of the Jember Fashion Carnaval as a child model who has studied the art of modelling. Tiara Andini also was involved in the Jember Indonesian Paskibraka Troops.

Tiara Andini attended elementary school at SD Al-Furqan Jember from 2008 to 2014. After that, Tiara Andini continued her education at SMP Negeri 3 Jember, and in 2017, Tiara Andini continued her education at SMA Muhammadiyah 3 Jember, majoring in natural science. Tiara Andini's parents enrolled her in an Islamic school so that, although she worked in the arts, Tiara Andini would have a strong religious education. When she was in high school, Tiara Andini was actively involved in extra-curricular music activities under the direction of Danial Soemba.

== Career ==
=== 2017 - 2018: Early career ===
Early in her career, Tiara Andini often participated in local-scale singing talent contests. Tiara Andini was a known finalist of Bintang Radio Indonesia and Asean RRI Jember in 2017.

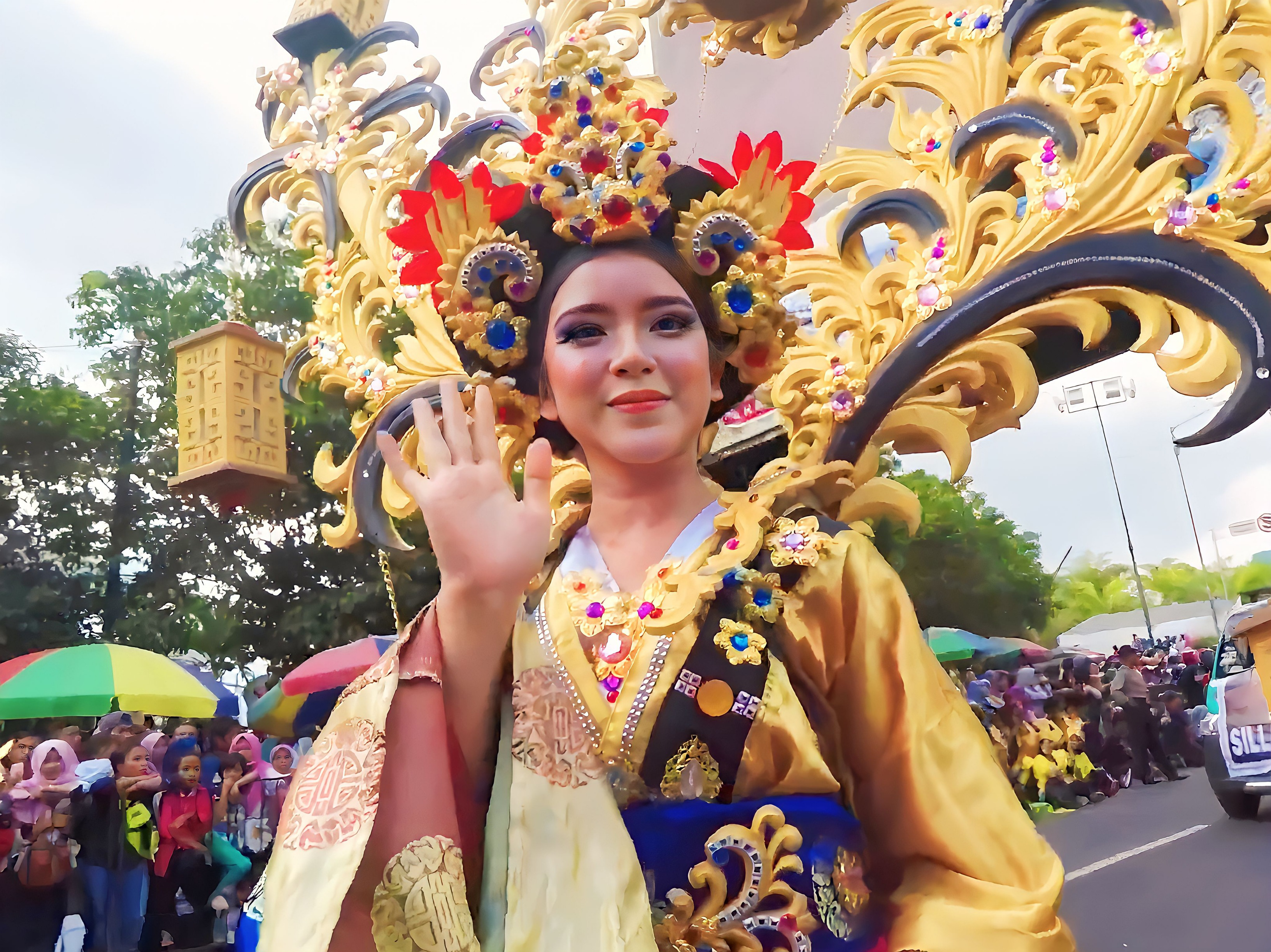
Portrait of Tiara Andini while performing at the Jember Fashion Carnaval 2018

In 2018, Tiara Andini was selected as a prototype fashion model for the Jember Fashion Carnaval with the theme of South Korea at the closing of the 2018 Asian Games. At the event, Tiara Andini also had the opportunity to share a moment with the South Korean idol group, Super Junior.

Continuing to talent contests on television, Tiara Andini participated in the third season of The Voice Indonesia, in which she failed her audition performing the song Bang Bang by Jessie J, Ariana Grande and Nicki Minaj. Before becoming as publicly known as she is today, Tiara Andini also worked as a wedding singer, often singing Mandarin songs at Chinese weddings. Tiara Andini received job offers almost every week. At the time, Tiara Andini's first income was approximately 100,000 IDR ($6.89).

=== 2019 - 2020: Indonesian Idol, debut single Gemintang Hatiku, acting debut and presenter ===
In 2019, Tiara Andini again participated in the talent search event, Indonesian Idol. During the audition, Tiara Andini performed Raisa's song Could it Be and got a titanium ticket from Judika. Because of this, Tiara Andini is known as the girl who received the titanium ticket in the tenth season and she is the only recipient of the titanium ticket who ever make it through to the final round in Indonesian Idol history. When competing, Tiara Andini had an official fan club founded on 26 November 2019, when Tiara Andini was in the top 13, named Mootiara, which stands for Mood Tiara Andini.

After passing the audition stage and going through a competition quarantine process for 5 months, on 2 March 2020, Tiara Andini was named the runner-up. As the runner-up of the tenth season of Indonesian Idol, Tiara Andini received a cash prize of 100,000,000 IDR, as well as one unit of the All New Nissan Livina MPV car. After the show, Tiara Andini signed a contract with the record label Universal Music Indonesia and was managed by Star Media Nusantara, an artist management company owned by MNC Group.

Performances on Indonesian Idol X
Round	Song	Original Singer	Result
Audition	Could it Be	Raisa	Titanium Ticket (from Judika)
Elimination 1 : Acapella	Reflection	Christina Aguilera	Safe
Elimination 2 : Group : Best of the Best	If I Ain't Got You	Alicia Keys	Safe
Elimination 3 : Solo	Karena Ku Sanggup	Agnez Mo	Safe
Showcase 1	New York, New York	Frank Sinatra	Safe
Final Showcase 1	Cinta Luar Biasa	Andmesh	Judges choice, Saved by Judika
Spectacular 1	Lily	K-391, Alan Walker, Emelie Hollow	Safe
Spectacular 2	So Am I	Ava Max	Safe
Spectacular 3	One Moment in Time	Whitney Houston	Safe
Spectacular 4	Happier	Ed Sheeran	Safe
Spectacular 5	Untuk Apa	Maudy Ayunda	Safe
Spectacular 6	Kiss and Make Up	Dua Lipa & Blackpink	Safe
Spectacular 7	Dia	Vina Panduwinata	Safe
Spectacular 8	Pamer Bojo	Didi Kempot	Bottom 3 (Safe)
Spectacular 9	Sedih Tak Berujung	Glenn Fredly	Safe
Spectacular 10	Waktu yang Salah	Fiersa Besari & Thantri	Safe
Spectacular 11	Like I'm Gonna Lose You	Meghan Trainor & John Legend	Safe
Spectacular 11	Miliki Aku	Dea Mirella	Safe
Spectacular 12	Surat Cinta untuk Starla	Virgoun	Safe
Spectacular 12	Flashlight	Jessie J	Safe
Road to Grand Final	Cinta Sendiri	Kahitna	Safe
Road to Grand Final	Bahasa Kalbu	Titi DJ	Safe
Grand Final	Kertonyono Medot Janji	Denny Caknan	Runner up
Grand Final	Kangen	Dewa 19	Runner up
Grand Final	The Greatest Love of All	Whitney Houston	Runner up
Grand Final	Gemintang Hatiku	Tiara Andini	Runner up
Result & Reunion	Pamer Bojo	Didi Kempot	Runner up
Result & Reunion	I Surrender	Celine Dion	Runner up

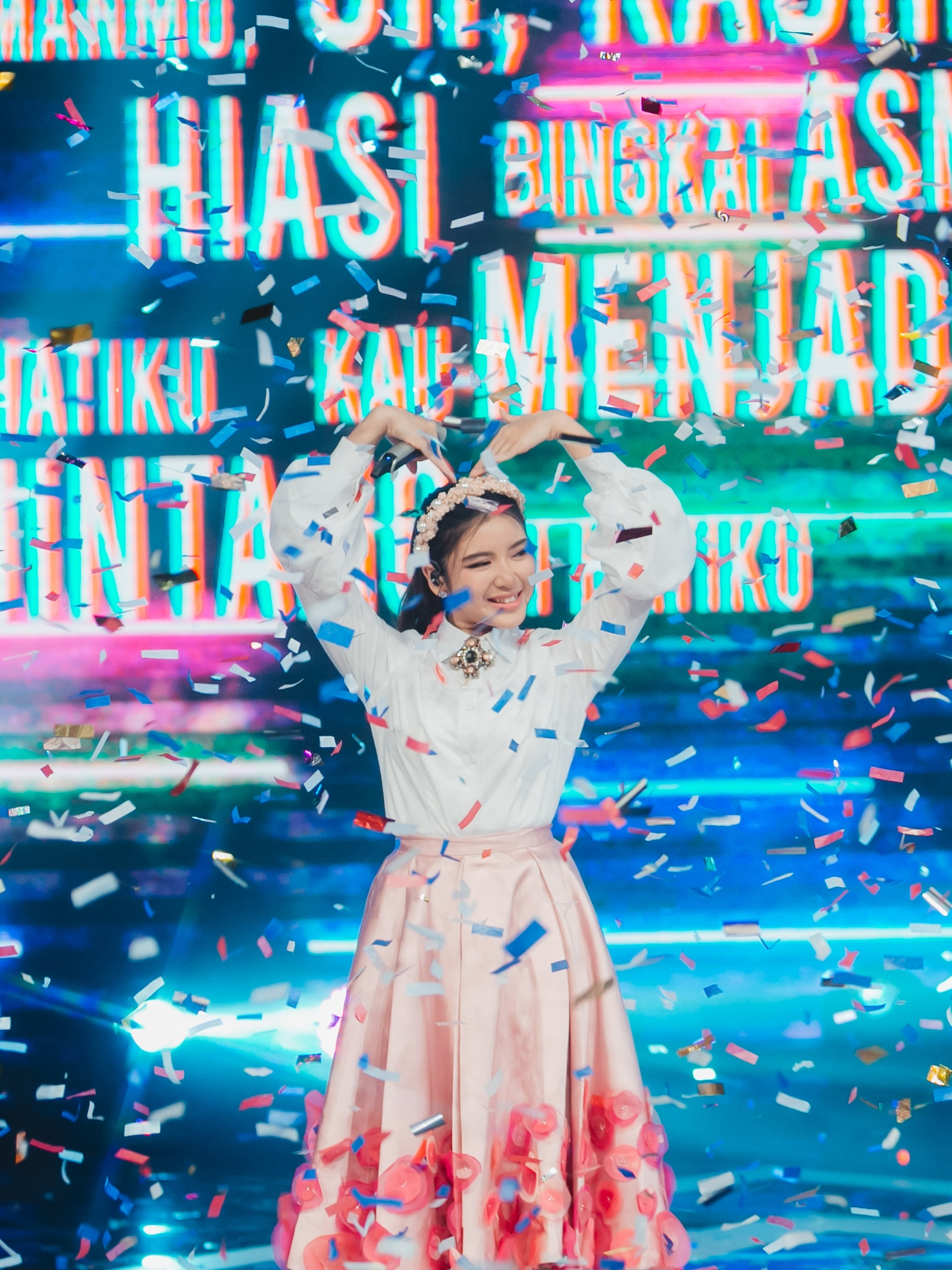
Portrait of Tiara Andini when singing the song Gemintang Hatiku at Final of Indonesian Idol

From Indonesian Idol, Tiara Andini got a winning song entitled Gemintang Hatiku, which became her first single as a singer. There are two versions of the song; Tiara Andini sings a dance-pop version of this song. This song succeeded in bringing Tiara Andini to win the award as Best Newcomer from the 2020 Anugerah Musik Indonesia Awards and the award as Best New Asian Artist Indonesia from the 2020 Mnet Asian Music Awards.

Two months after graduating from Indonesian Idol, Tiara Andini made her acting debut in Amanah Wali 4 drama series as Tiara Andini, a supporting role character from episodes 26 to 29 which aired on the RCTI television station in May 2020.

On 1 July 2020, Tiara Andini was lined up to presenter the event Dahsyatnya 2020 which was broadcast by RCTI, she joined 3 other presenters, namely Ayu Dewi, Denny Cagur, and Raffi Ahmad. Continued on 29 July 2020, Tiara Andini was lined up to be the presenter with Luna Maya at Tokopedia: Waktu Indonesia Belanja TV Show which presented a special appearance from South Korean boy band, BTS. This event was broadcast by Indosiar and SCTV television stations.

On 8 August 2020, Tiara Andini became one of the performers at the Smartfren WOW Virtual Concert which was broadcast live in three countries, namely Indonesia, England and South Korea. In Indonesia, this event is broadcast by SCTV. In this event, Tiara Andini is trusted to have a duet with one of the legends of Indonesian music, the late Didi Kempot, using the concept of holograms, extended reality (XR) and interactive virtual audience technology.

=== 2021 - present: Arti untuk Cinta, Tiara Andini and film debut ===
On 21 February 2021, Tiara Andini sang a duet with Thai actor Bright Vachirawit at the Giveaway Roboguru Show. This event was broadcast by 9 television stations, namely Indosiar, Trans7, Trans TV, RCTI, GTV, SCTV, MNCTV, RTV, and NET.

A year after graduating from Indonesian Idol, Tiara Andini joined with Arsy Widianto to collaborate on a music project. This project was originally a music series consisting of four interconnected songs, starting with the song Cintanya Aku and ending with Bahaya. On 12 March 2021, the music series was packaged and released as an extended play entitled Arti untuk Cinta with the addition of one new song to the album track. Four songs in this album were performed in collaboration, and a song was performed solo by Arsy Widianto, namely Padamu Luka. The word Arti used in the title is an abbreviation of the names Arsy Widianto and Tiara Andini. In the making of this album, Indonesian musician Yovie Widianto was assisted as a songwriter and as a producer by Adrian Kitut. Arti untuk Cinta has won the award as Best Pop Album from the 2021 Anugerah Musik Indonesia Awards.

After she postponed going to college for a year to pursue her career. In 2021, Tiara Andini enrolled at Multimedia Nusantara University, where she chose the S1 (undergraduate) level in the Communication Science study program.

Two days before the release of her debut album, she was picked as Spotify's Indonesian Artist of the Month in the context of the Equal campaign program. In the campaign, her photo was chosen to be placed on a digital billboard at Times Square in New York, USA. On 17 December 2021, she released her first studio album which has a homonymous title with her stage name and received high month acclaimed. The album contains eight tracks of which five singles have been previously released. Celebrating the release of her debut album, she also held an Afterparty event which aired exclusively through the YouTube Premium service on the album's release date. Her songs have become top charts on various digital music platforms. On Spotify, the album's total listeners will be over 500 million by October 2023. This album also won Album of the Year at the 2022 Indonesian Music Awards.

On 30 December 2021, Tiara Andini along with other musicians such as Raisa, Noah, Weird Genius, and Erwin Gutawa were involved in a music concert titled Suryanation: Suara Cahaya Nusantara which was broadcast live by SCTV with the theme of Indonesia's fighting spirit to enter 2022. Suryanation: Suara Cahaya Nusantara is the first music concert and program on Indonesian television that uses extended reality (XR) technology throughout the event.

On 16 January 2022, Tiara Andini, along with Gangga Kusuma, Nadin Amizah, Juicy Luicy, and Kaleb J, were included in the list of 5 outstanding young musicians of Spotify Wrapped 2021.

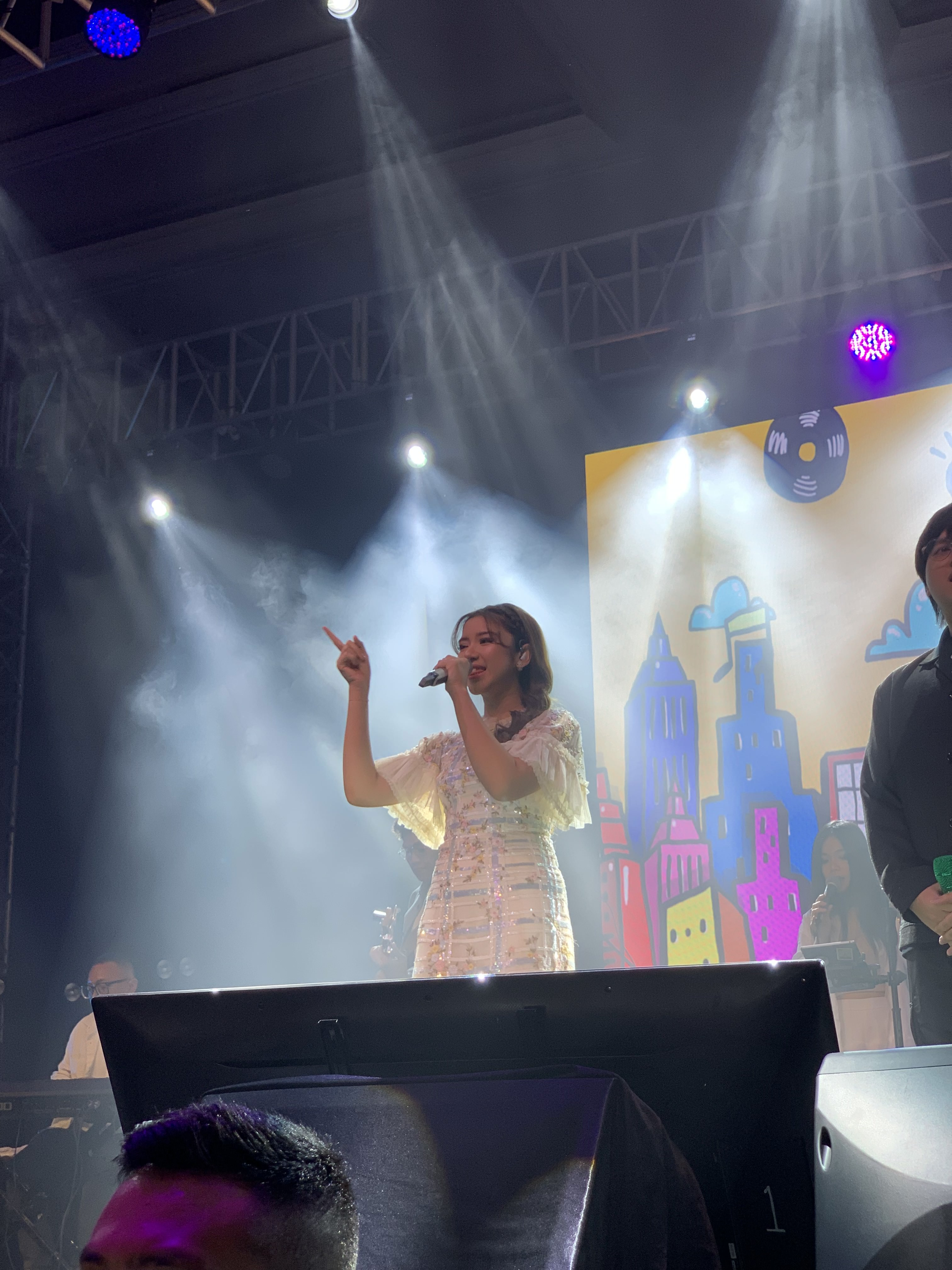
Portrait of Tiara Andini while performing at the Bahaya (Mantan) Terindah Live Tour in Bandung.

In May 2022, Tiara Andini started her first concert tour, entitled Bahaya (Mantan) Terindah Live Tour. Her first concert in Bandung attracted more than 2,700 people.

Tiara Andini made her film debut by starring in the film titled My Sassy Girl directed by Fajar Bustomi, which is a remake of the 2001 South Korean film of the same name. Tiara Andini was cast as the main role alongside Jefri Nichol. The film premiered in cinemas on 23 June 2022.

In October 2022, Tiara Andini collaborated with a Filipino singer Zack Tabudlo to release By My Side. This song is Tiara Andini's first collaboration with a singer other than an Indonesian musician. Before releasing the song, Tiara Andini performed live with Zack in Philippines on a music show UMUSIC FansVerse.

In May 2023, Tiara Andini, in collaboration with Weird Genius, Lyodra Ginting, and Ziva Magnolya, unveiled the official anthem for the 2023 FIFA U-20 World Cup, entitled Glorious, originally intended as the official theme for the FIFA U-20 World Cup in Indonesia, but due to controversy, the event was moved to Argentina. However, the official song continued to feature contributions from Indonesian singers.

In September 2023, Tiara Andini released her first solo song entirely in English, with the release of Flip It Up.

This composition was written and produced by Hyuk Shin, a famous producer from South Korea known for his work with K-Pop idols, including Super Junior, SNSD, Shinee, Exo, Gfriend, ITZY, aespa and many more, and global artists like Justin Bieber.

== Artistry ==
=== Influences and voice ===
Since her debut in Indonesian Idol, her voice has been noted by powerful people in the music industry. Indonesian diva, Rossa commented that Tiara Andini's voice is a "money voice" (most wanted by music producers). Indonesian musician, Yovie Widianto said that Tiara Andini has an "almost similar voice color" to Indonesian singer Raisa, whom Tiara Andini idolizes and is inspired by Miley Cyrus, Jennifer Lopez, Jessie J, Mariah Carey, Céline Dion, Whitney Houston, Alicia Keys, Demi Lovato, Britney Spears and Ariana Grande. South Korean musician, Yesung and Ryeowook of Idol group Super Junior also stated that Tiara Andini's voice is "beautiful". Tiara Andini who loves K-pop music also regards Kim Jennie and Lalisa Manoban, a member of K-pop group Blackpink as a role model for her career in Indonesian music industry. Tiara Andini stated she's "motivated" to raise the quality of her music along with her dancing skills. This is apparent in her singles, "Gemintang Hatiku" and "Hadapi Berdua" in which she displays her ability to sing while dancing.

The influence of South Korean pop culture on Tiara Andini's musical style can also be seen in several of her music videos. The Arti untuk Cinta music series videos, of singles "Hadapi Berdua" and "Buktikan", was produced with the style of South Korean dramas in mind. In addition, Tiara Andini also released a song recorded in the Korean language, which was featured on her EP Arti untuk Cinta.

=== Musical style ===
Tiara Andini is known as a singer of pop ballads. Most of the songs she released have a slow tempo and a melancholy tone. Her first EP, Arti untuk Cinta, consists entirely of pop ballads with lyrics about romantic relationships. Her debut album, Tiara Andini, is also dominated by pop ballads. Five of all eight songs in the album are in the pop ballad genre, such as "Maafkan Aku #terlanjurmencinta" and "365". In "Hadapi Berdua" and "Gemintang Hatiku", she explored her musical prowess in dance pop genre and also showcased her dancing ability. Lastly in the song "Buktikan", Tiara Andini explores her ability in the R&B pop genre.

=== Stage name ===
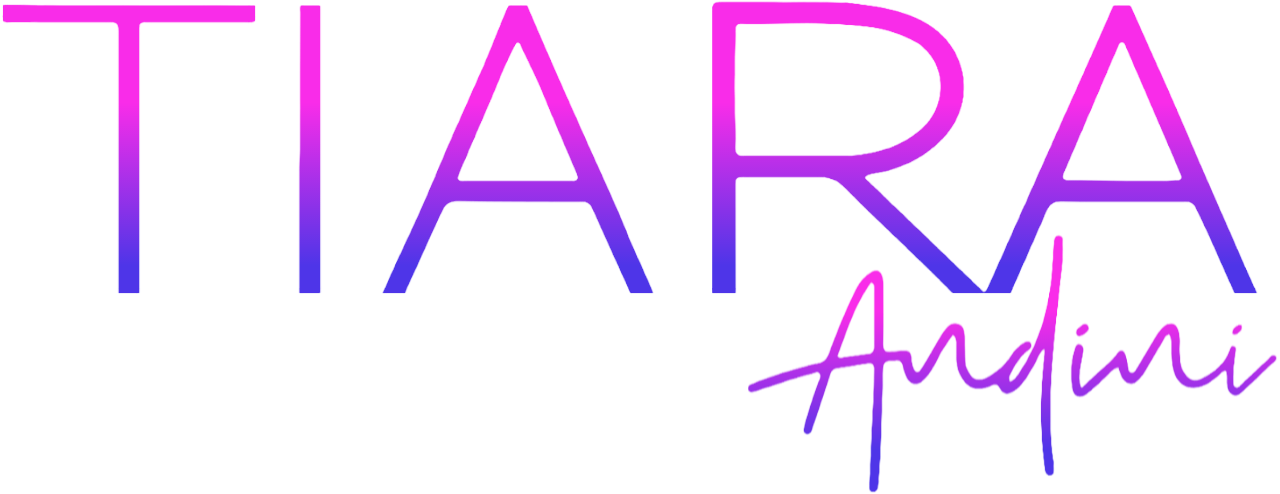
The official logo of Tiara Andini.

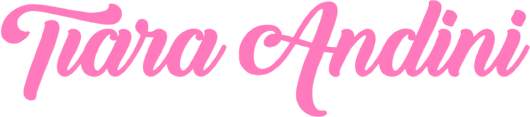
The New official logo of Tiara Andini.

After graduating from Indonesian Idol, Tiara Andini changed her stage name, which was previously called Tiara Anugrah (when she competed) to Tiara Andini. She felt that Anugrah was "quite difficult to pronounce". Therefore, Tiara Andini chose to use Andini as her stage name, which was taken from her last name. Before choosing Tiara Andini as her new stage name, she consulted with her parents and management.

== Personal life ==
Tiara Andini currently lives in Serpong, Greater Jakarta, Indonesia, after moving there in 2020. Her native language is Javanese, and she also speaks Indonesian and English with Javanese accent.

== Discography ==
=== Studio album ===
List of studio albums with selected details
Title	Details
Tiara Andini	Released: 17 December 2021; Label: Universal Music Indonesia; Format: CD, Digital download
Tiara Andini (Special Live Session)	Released: 20 December 2024; Label: Universal Music Indonesia; Format: Digital download
Edelweiss	Released: 17 October 2025; Label: Universal Music Indonesia; Format: Digital download

=== Extended play ===
List of extended play, with selected details
Title	Details
Arti untuk Cinta	Released: 12 March 2021; Label: Universal Music Indonesia; Format: CD, digital download

List of extended play, with selected details
Title	Details
Arti Semestinya Cinta	Released: 7 March 2024; Label: Universal Music Indonesia; Format: digital download

=== Compilation album ===
List of compilation album, with selected details
Title	Details
Musikini Super Hits 2	Released: 21 April 2021; Label: Jagonya Musik & Sport Indonesia; Format: CD

=== Singles ===
==== As lead artist ====
List of singles as lead artist, with selected chart positions, showing year of release and name of album
Title	Year	Peak chart positions	Album
Title	Year	IDN (Note: Includes the Billboard Indonesia Top 100 (defunct as of 2020), and Indonesia Songs (part of Billboard's Hits of the World (2022 onwards)).)	Album
"Gemintang Hatiku" (Note: "Gemintang Hatiku" is a song prepared as a victory song for Tiara and Lyodra in the top round of the tenth season of Indonesian Idol. This song is Tiara's first single as a singer under the Universal Music Indonesia label, as well as the first single written and produced by Laleilmanino. This song has two versions where the pop ballad version is performed by Lyodra while Tiara sings the dance pop version.)	2020	16	Tiara Andini
"Maafkan Aku #terlanjurmencinta" (Note: Usually written in the style "Maafkan Aku #terlanjurmencinta". This song has three versions with the same last two words in the title, respectively, popularized by Lyodra Ginting, Tiara Andini, and Ziva Magnolya.)	2020	1	Tiara Andini
"365"	2020	40	Tiara Andini
"Cintanya Aku" (with Arsy Widianto)	2021	9	Arti Untuk Cinta
"Diam-Diam" (with Arsy Widianto)	2021	166	Arti Untuk Cinta
"Bahaya" (with Arsy Widianto)	2021	4	Arti Untuk Cinta
"Hadapi Berdua"	2021	135	Tiara Andini
"Memilih Aku" (Note: The song "Memilih Aku" was originally a new theme song from Telkomsel in 2021 and was first released at the Telkomsel Awards event. However, due to a positive response from the public, the song was finally released as a single by Universal Music Indonesia.) (with Arsy Widianto)	2021	-	Non-album single
"Buktikan" (Note: The song "Buktikan" is a remake of the song with the same title that was sung by Dewi Sandra in 2007.) (with Vidi Aldiano)	2021	173	Tiara Andini
"Usai"	2022	12	Non-album singles
"Tega"	2023	17	Non-album singles
"Flip It Up"	2023	-	Non-album singles
"Ngeluwihi"	2024	-	Non-album singles
"Lagu Pernikahan Kita" (with Arsy Widianto)	2024	20	Arti Semestinya Cinta
"Masih Hatiku" (with Arsy Widianto)	2024	14	Arti Semestinya Cinta
"Cantik" (with Arsy Widianto)	2024	36	Arti Semestinya Cinta
"Kupu-Kupu"	2024	4	Edelweiss
"Bukan Untukku"	2024	143	Edelweiss
"Tanpa Cinta" (with Yovie Widianto)	2025	10	Non-album singles
"Adu Bola Mata"	2025	-	Edelwiess
"-" denotes releases that did not chart or were not released in that region.

==== As featured artist ====
List of singles as featured artist, showing year of release and album name
Title	Year	Peak chart positions	Album
Title	Year	IDN	Album
"Damaikan Dunia" (as part of 25 musicians Universal Music Indonesia and Def Jam Indonesia)	2020	-	Non-album singles
"Indonesia Jaya" (as part of the eight finalists Indonesian Idol tenth season)	2020	-	Non-album singles
"By My Side" (Zack Tabudlo featuring Tiara Andini)	2022	-	Non-album singles
"Menyesal" (Yovie Widianto featuring Lyodra, Tiara Andini, Ziva Magnolya)	2023	6	Non-album singles
"Apa Artinya Aku" (Yovie Widianto featuring Lyodra, Tiara Andini, Ziva Magnolya)	2024		Non-album singles
"-" denotes releases that did not chart or were not released in that region.

==== Promotional singles ====
List of promotional singles, with positions on selected charts, showing year of release and album name
Title	Year	Peak chart positions	Album
Title	Year	IDN	Album
"Bahaya (Korean Version)"	2021	-	Arti Untuk Cinta
"Menjadi Dia"	2021	59	Tiara Andini
"Merasa Indah"	2021	1	Tiara Andini
"Janji Setia"	2021	13	Tiara Andini
"Glorious" -The Official Song of 2023 FIFA U-20 World Cup (Weird Genius featuring Lyodra, Tiara Andini, Ziva Magnolya)	2023	-	Non-album singles
"Glorious (Remix)" -The Official Song of 2023 FIFA U-17 World Cup (Weird Genius featuring Lyodra, Tiara Andini, Ziva Magnolya)	2023	-	Non-album singles
"-" denotes releases that did not chart or were not released in that region.

=== Songwriting credits ===
Year	Artist	Song	Album	Lyricist	
Year	Artist	Song	Album	Credited	With
2021	Tiara Andini	"Janji Setia"	Tiara Andini	Yes	Asta Andoko, Ramadhan Handy
2023	Tiara Andini	"Tega"	Single-non album	Yes	Andmesh Kamaleng
2024	Tiara Andini	"Ngeluwihi"	Single-non album	Yes	Hyuk Shin, Chris M. Yong, SYA

=== Music video ===
List of music videos, showing year of release and director
Title	Year	Other singer	Director
As lead artist
"Gemintang Hatiku"	2020	—N/a	Jodie Octora
"Maafkan Aku #terlanjurmencinta"	2020	—N/a	Risky Jusuf
"365"	2020	—N/a	Isdam Atrahadena
"Cintanya Aku"	2021	Arsy Widianto	Bobby Adrian
"Diam-Diam"	2021	Arsy Widianto	Bobby Adrian
"Bahaya"	2021	Arsy Widianto	Bobby Adrian; Jessy Sylviani
"Hadapi Berdua"	2021	—N/a	Bobby Adrian
"Memilih Aku"	2021	Arsy Widianto	Bobby Adrian; Jessy Sylviani
"Buktikan"	2021	Vidi Aldiano	Bobby Adrian; Jessy Sylviani
"Menjadi Dia"	2021	—N/a	Bobby Adrian; Jessy Sylviani
"Merasa Indah"	2022	—N/a	Bobby Adrian; Jessy Sylviani
"Janji Setia"	2022	—N/a	Isdam Atrahadena
"By My Side"	2022	Zack Tabudlo	—N/a
"Usai"	2022	—N/a	Isdam Atrahadena
"Menyesal"	2023	Yovie Widianto, Lyodra, Ziva Magnolya	—N/a
"Tega"	2023	—N/a	Prialangga
"Flip It Up"	2023	—N/a	Timo
"Ngeluwihi"	2024	—N/a	Timo
"Lagu Pernikahan Kita"	2024	Arsy Widianto	Bobby Adrian; Jessy Sylviani
"Masih Hatiku"	2024	Arsy Widianto	Bobby Adrian; Jessy Sylviani
"Cantik"	2024	Arsy Widianto	Bobby Adrian; Jessy Sylviani
"Kupu-Kupu"	2024	—N/a	Michael Budihardjo
"Bukan Untukku"	2024	—N/a	Prialangga
"Apa Artinya Aku"	2024	Yovie Widianto, Lyodra, Ziva Magnolya	Bobby Adrian; Jessy Sylviani
"Tanpa Cinta"	2025	Yovie Widianto	Prialangga
Guest appearance
"Padamu Luka"	2021	Arsy Widianto	Bobby Adrian; Jessy Sylviani
Other
"Indonesia Jaya"	2020	Top 8 Indonesian Idol X	Benedict Agung TH

== Filmography ==
=== Film ===
Year	Title	Role	Production	Ref.
2022	Remake of My Sassy Girl	Sissy	Falcon Pictures	

=== Television series ===
Year	Title	Role	Production	Notes	Ref.
2020	Amanah Wali 4	Tiara	MNC Pictures	4 episodes	
2020	Anak Basket the Series	Tiara	Dahsyat	7 episodes	
2021	Anak Basket the Series	Tiara	Dahsyat	7 episodes	

=== Television shows ===
Year	Title	Role	Ref.
2020	Dahsyatnya 2020	Presenter	
2020	Sahur Segerr	Guest star	
2020	Okay Bos	Guest star	
2020	Siyap Bos	Guest star	
2020	ADA Show	Guest star	
2020	Opera Van Java	Guest star	
2020	Ini Talkshow	Guest star	
2020	Tonight Show	Guest star	
2020	Malam Malam	Guest star	
2020	Brownis (Obrowlan Manis)	Guest star	
2020	Santuy Malam	Guest star	
2020	Rumpi (No Secret)	Guest star	
2020	The Sultan	Guest star	
2020	3xtraOrdinary Love	Guest star	
2020	Rumah Seleb	Guest star	
2020	Tantangan 60 Detik	Guest star	
2020	Tukul Arwana One Man Show	Guest star	
2021	Dahsyatnya 2021	Presenter	
2021	ADA Show	Guest star	
2021	Sahur Segerr	Guest star	
2021	Opera Van Java	Guest star	
2021	Rumpi (No Secret)	Guest star	
2021	Deddy's Corner	Guest star	
2021	Sore-Sore Ambyar	Guest star	
2021	Ramadan in the Kost	Guest star	
2021	In The Kost	Guest star	
2021	NET. On Top	Guest star	
2021	Tonight Show	Guest star	
2021	The Sultan	Guest star	
2021	Rumah Seleb	Guest star	
2021	OK Chef	Guest star	
2021	Tukul Arwana One Man Show	Guest star	
2022	The Sultan Entertainment	Guest star	
2022	Tonight Show Premiere	Guest star	
2022	CNN Indonesia Connected	Guest star	
2022	Lapor Pak!	Guest star	

=== Special broadcasts ===
Year	Title	Role	Ref.
2020	Tokopedia: Waktu Indonesia Belanja TV Show	Presenter	
2020	Ruangguru 6 Tahun	Guest star	
2020	Lazada 12.12 Garbolnas Grand Show	Guest star	
2020	Shopee 11.11 Big Sale TV Show	Guest star	
2020	Smartfren WOW Virtual Concert	Guest star	
2021	Giveaway Roboguru Show	Guest star	
2021	Lazada 11.11 Super Show	Guest star	
2021	Amazing Magician	Guest star	
2021	eSports Star Indonesia Season 2	Guest star	
2021	Konser Demi Waktu	Guest star	
2021	Konser Rahasia Cinta	Guest star	
2021	Suryanation: Suara Cahaya Nusantara	Guest star	
2021	Jejak Waktu	Guest star	
2022	Malam Juara Ruangguru	Guest star	
2022	Lazada Super Party Epic 10th Birthday	Guest star	
2022	Variety Show Menabung Pahala Kebaikan	Guest star	
2022	Welcome to NETVERSE	Guest star	
2022	Simply K-Pop Con-Tour	Guest star	

== Tour ==
=== As the lead artist ===
- Bahaya (Mantan) Terindah Live Tour (2022)

Date	Time	City	Country	Location	Ref.
27 May 2022	07.30 pm (WIB)	Bandung	Indonesia	Convention Center, Trans Luxury Hotel	
4 June 2022	07.30 pm (WIB)	Surabaya	Indonesia	Tunjungan Plaza	
23 July 2022	07.30 pm (WITA)	Nusa Dua	Indonesia	Bali Nusa Dua Convention Center	
3 September 2022	07.30 pm (WIB)	Medan	Indonesia	Medan International Convention Center	
6 October 2022	07.30 pm (WITA)	Makassar	Indonesia	Sandeq Ballroom, Claro Hotel	

=== Guest star and as featured artist ===
- Rossa 25 Shining Years Concert, Surabaya & Bandung (2022)

=== International music festival ===
- Java Jazz Festival, JIExpo Kemayoran (2022)
- UMUSIC FansVerse, Philippines (2022)

== Awards and nominations ==
Year	Award	Category	Nominee(s)	Result	Ref.
2020	Dashyatnya Awards	Outstanding Song	"Gemintang Hatiku"	Won	
2020	Dashyatnya Awards	Outstanding Host	Tiara Andini	Won	
2020	Dashyatnya Awards	Outstanding Newcomer	Tiara Andini	Nominated	
2020	Dashyatnya Awards	Outstanding Trio	Trio JKT (with Brisia Jodie & Kiky Saputri)	Nominated	
2020	Dashyatnya Awards	Outstanding Group	Group Idol (with Lyodra Ginting & Ziva Magnolya)	Won	
2020	RCTI+ Indonesian Digital Awards	Most Favorite Live Chat Plus Celebrity	Lyodra Ginting & Tiara Andini	Nominated	
2020	RCTI+ Indonesian Digital Awards	Digital Darling Female	Tiara Andini	Won	
2020	Ambyar Awards	Cover Song Singer	"Pamer Bojo"	Won	
2020	Silet Awards	Slitted Newcomer	Tiara Andini	Won	
2020	Anugerah Musik Indonesia	Best Newcomer	"Gemintang Hatiku"	Won	
2020	Anugerah Musik Indonesia	Best Female Pop Solo Artist	"Maafkan Aku #terlanjurmencinta"	Nominated	
2020	Anugerah Musik Indonesia	Best Production Works	"Maafkan Aku #terlanjurmencinta"	Nominated	
2020	Mnet Asian Music Awards	Best New Asian Artist Indonesia	"Gemintang Hatiku"	Won	
2020	Local Music Hero Jak FM	Favorite Female Hero	Tiara Andini	Won	
2020	Local Music Hero Jak FM	Favorite Sad Song	"Maafkan Aku #terlanjurmencinta"	Won	
2020	Local Music Hero Jak FM	Favorite Song	"Maafkan Aku #terlanjurmencinta"	Won	
2020	Resso Indonesia Anthem Awards	Song to Sing Together	"Maafkan Aku #terlanjurmencinta"	Won	
2020	Kiss Awards	Most Kiss Newcomer	Tiara Andini	Nominated	
2021	Telkomsel Awards	Favorite Song	"Maafkan Aku #terlanjurmencinta"	Won	
2021	JOOX Indonesia Music Awards	Indonesian Song of the Year	"Maafkan Aku #terlanjurmencinta"	Nominated	
2021	JOOX Indonesia Music Awards	Indonesian Artist of the Year	Tiara Andini	Won	
2021	RCTI+ Indonesian Digital Awards	Digital Darling Female	Tiara Andini	Nominated	
2021	RCTI+ Indonesian Digital Awards	Most Favorite Host	Dahsyatnya 2021 (with Denny Cagur, Raffi Ahmad & Ayu Dewi)	Won	
2021	Obsesi Awards	Obsessed Young Celebrities	Tiara Andini	Nominated	
2021	Anugerah Musik Indonesia	Best Female Pop Solo Artist	"365"	Nominated	
2021	Anugerah Musik Indonesia	Best Album	Arti untuk Cinta (with Arsy Widianto)	Nominated	
2021	Anugerah Musik Indonesia	Best Pop Album	Arti untuk Cinta (with Arsy Widianto)	Won	
2021	Anugerah Musik Indonesia	Best Collaborative Production Works	"Cintanya Aku" (with Arsy Widianto)	Nominated	
2021	Indonesian Music Awards	Social Media Artist of the Year	"Hadapi Berdua"	Nominated	
2021	Indonesian Music Awards	Album of the Year	Arti untuk Cinta (with Arsy Widianto)	Nominated	
2021	Indonesian Music Awards	Collaboration of the Year	"Cintanya Aku" (with Arsy Widianto)	Nominated	
2021	Line Today Choice	Most Favorite Indonesian Singer	Tiara Andini	Nominated	
2021	Angket Mustang Awards	Most Prolific Singer	Tiara Andini	Won	
2022	Kiss Awards	Most Kiss Female Pop Singer	Tiara Andini	Nominated	
2022	TikTok Awards Indonesia	Musician of the Years	Tiara Andini	Nominated	
2022	SCTV Music Awards	Most Popular Female Solo Singer	Tiara Andini	Won	
2022	SCTV Music Awards	Most Popular Collaboration	"Memilih Aku" (with Arsy Widianto)	Nominated	
2022	SCTV Music Awards	Most Social Media Singer	Tiara Andini	Nominated	
2022	Joox Top Music Awards	Top Local Song	Menjadi Dia	Nominated	
2022	Joox Top Music Awards	Top Local Song	Janji Setia	Nominated	
2022	Joox Top Music Awards	Top Local Song	Merasa Indah	Nominated	
2022	Joox Top Music Awards	Global Fans Pick	Merasa Indah	Nominated	
2022	Anugerah Musik Indonesia	Best Pop Album	Tiara Andini (Album)	Nominated	
2022	Anugerah Musik Indonesia	Best Album	Tiara Andini (Album)	Nominated	
2022	Anugerah Musik Indonesia	Best Re-arrangement Production Work	Buktikan (with Vidi Aldiano)	Nominated	
2022	Silet Awards	Slitted New Couples	Tiara Andini & Alshad Ahmad	Nominated	
2022	Indonesian Music Awards	Album of The Year	Tiara Andini (Album)	Won	
2023	SCTV Music Awards	Most Popular Female Solo Singer	Tiara Andini	Won	
2023	SCTV Music Awards	Most Popular Song	"Usai"	Nominated	
2023	SCTV Music Awards	Most Popular Music Video	"Usai"	Nominated	
2023	SCTV Music Awards	Most Social Media Singer	Tiara Andini	Nominated	
2023	Dahsyatnya Awards	Outstanding Song	"Menyesal" (with Yovie Widianto, Lyodra & Ziva Magnolya)	Won	
2023	TikTok Awards Indonesia	Musician of the Years	Tiara Andini	Won	
2023	MTV Europe Music Awards	Best Asia Act	Tiara Andini	Nominated	
2023	Anugerah Musik Indonesia	Best Collaborative Production Works	"Menyesal" (with Yovie Widianto, Lyodra & Ziva Magnolya)	Won	
2023	Anugerah Musik Indonesia	Best Re-arrangement Production Work	"Menyesal" (with Yovie Widianto, Lyodra & Ziva Magnolya)	Nominated	
2023	Awit Awards	Best Global Collaboration Recording	"By My Side" (with Zack Tabudlo)	Nominated	
2023	Indonesian Music Awards	Female Singer of The Year	Tiara Andini	Nominated	
2023	Indonesian Music Awards	Social Media Artist of The Year	Tiara Andini	Won	
2024	SCTV Music Awards	Most Popular Female Solo Singer	Tiara Andini	Nominated	
2024	SCTV Music Awards	Most Popular Music Video	"Ngeluwihi"	Nominated	
2024	Kids' Choice Awards	Favourite Asian Act	Tiara Andini	Nominated	
2024	Indonesian Music Awards	Female Singer of The Year	Tiara Andini	Nominated	
2024	Indonesian Music Awards	Song of The Year	Kupu-Kupu	Won	
2024	Youtube Music Academy	Pop Artist of The Year	Tiara Andini	Won	
2024	Anugerah Musik Indonesia	Best Female Pop Solo Artist	"Kupu-Kupu"	Nominated	
2024	Anugerah Musik Indonesia	Best Collaborative Production Works	"Masih Hatiku" (with Arsy Widianto)	Won	
2024	Anugerah Musik Indonesia	Best Re-arrangement Production Work	"Cantik" (with Arsy Widianto)	Nominated	
2025	SCTV Music Awards	Most Popular Song	Kupu-Kupu	Nominated	
2025	SCTV Music Awards	Most Popular Remake Song	"Bukan Untukku"	Nominated	

Awards and achievements
Preceded by Nadin Amizah	23rd Annual Anugerah Musik Indonesia for Best Newcomer; 2020	Succeeded by Anneth Delliecia

1. Awards that do not have a nomination list and only the winners announced by the jury are written separately in the subtitles of the special awards.

=== Special awards ===
- Tiara Andini received YouTube Creator Awards in the form of a Silver Creator Award on 24 June 2020, because her YouTube channel has reached 100 thousand subscribers.
- Tiara Andini received the 2020 Social Media Awards which was managed by Marketing magazine and based on the results of research conducted by an independent institution, MediaWave in the Female Singer category for the extraordinary positive sentiment on social media.
- Tiara Andini received an award from the YouTube Partner Summit 2020, because her second single entitled "Maafkan Aku #terlanjurmencinta" managed to stay on the YouTube trending chart for 28 consecutive weeks.
- Tiara Andini received YouTube Creator Awards in the form of Gold Creator Award on 22 February 2021, because her YouTube channel has reached 1 million subscribers.
- Tiara Andini along with nine other women won the Indonesia's Beautiful Women 2021 award which was held by HighEnd magazine.
- Tiara Andini receive the 2023 Spotify Wrapped Live Indonesia as Top 2 Female Artist of The Year and Top 3 Artist of The Year
- Tiara Andini receive the 2024 Spotify Wrapped Live Indonesia as Top 2 Female Artist of The Year and Top 4 Artist of The Year
- Tiara Andini receive the 2025 Official Indonesia Chart as Top 5 Local Artists

== Endorsements ==
=== Brand ambassador ===
Along with her career, Tiara Andini has also been appointed as a brand ambassador for several products, including:

- Smartfren (2020)
- Hanasui (2021 - 2022)
- Good Day (2021 - 2023)
- Lazada (2022–2024)
- Campina Ice Cream (2022 - 2024)
- Boss Kalpa (2023 - 2024)
- Samsung (2023–present)
- Garnier Indonesia (2024–present)
- UBS Gold (2024)
- Sunsilk Indonesia (2024–present)
- Sehat Aqua (2025–present)

=== Commercial star ===
- Smartfren 1ON+ (2020)
- Samsung Galaxy A series (2020) (with xxgoy & Ramengvrl)
- Good Day Mocacinno (2021) (with Rizky Febian)
- Hanasui Vitamin C + Collagen Serum (2021)
- Lazada Festival Belanja 11.11 (2021)
- THENBLANK x Tiara Andini Ramadhan edition, Rama & Layla Collection (2022)
- Samsung Galaxy A Series 5G (2022)
- Lazada 6.6 Sale (2022)
- Uniqlo #ColorDanceChallenge (2022) (with Refal Hady, Yura Yunita, Natya Shina, and Rendy Pritananda)
- Lazada 7.7 Mid-Year Sale (2022)
- Campina Ice Cream (2023)
- Boss Kalpa (2023)
- Samsung (2023)
- Garnier (2024)
- UBS Gold (2024)
- Sunsilk (2024)
- Aqua (2025)

== Notes ==
Preceded by Ahmad Abdul	Indonesian Idol runner up 2020	Succeeded by Mark Natama
