= Lyodra =

Indonesian singer (born 2003)

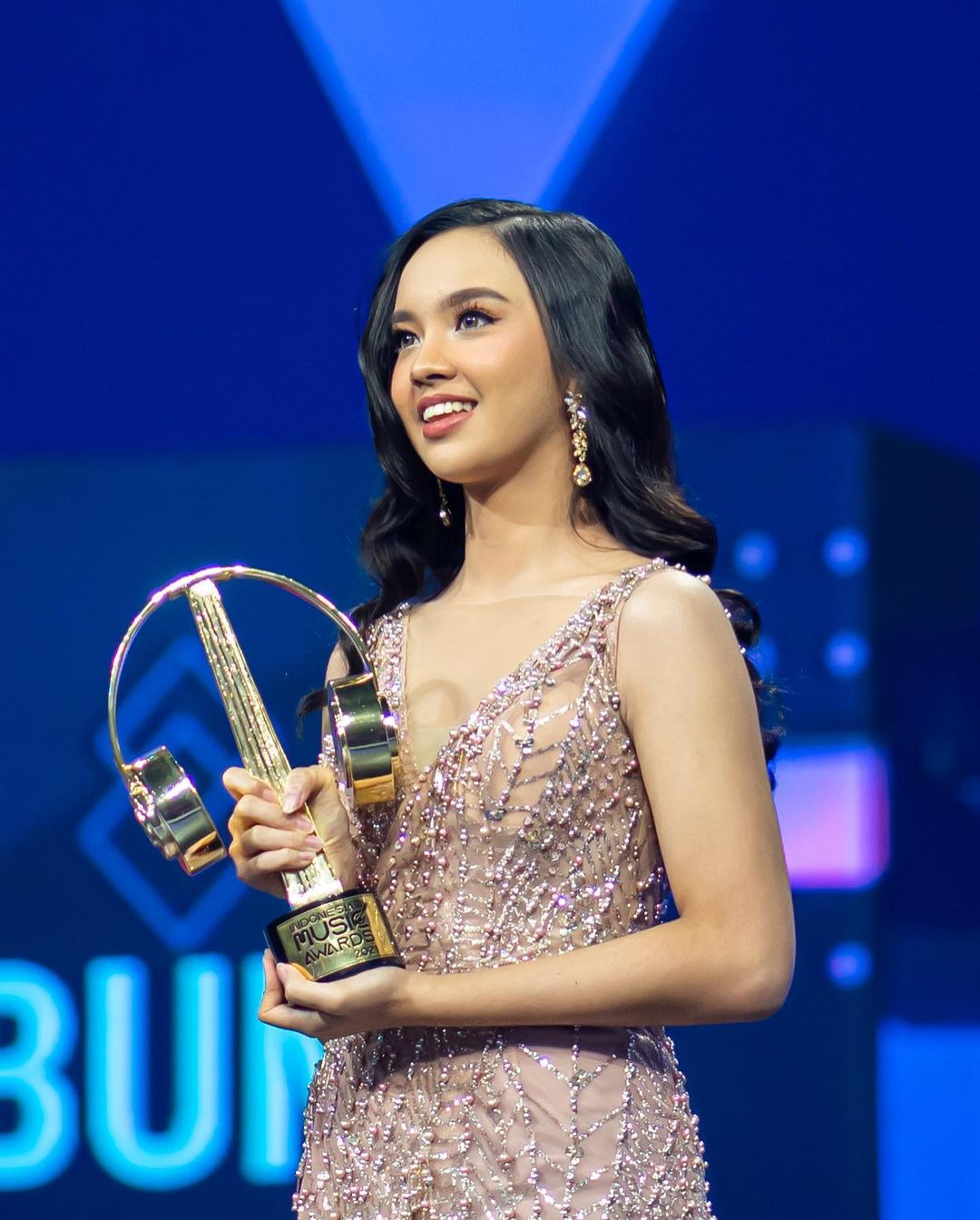
- Lyodra in 2021
- Born: Lyodra Margareta Ginting; 21 June 2003 (age 23); Medan, North Sumatra, Indonesia
- Education: Pelita Harapan University (unfinished)
- Occupations: Singer, actress
- Years active: 2013–present
- Musical career
- Genres: Pop; R&B
- Instrument: Vocals
- Label: Universal Music Indonesia

Lyodra Margareta Ginting (Indonesian pronunciation: [liˈjodra marɡaˈrɛta ˈɡintɪŋ] lee-yoh-drah; born 21 June 2003), known mononymously as Lyodra, is an Indonesian singer and actress. She was the winner of the A3 category at the 2017 Sanremo Junior children's international solo singing competition in Sanremo, Italy, and the winner of the tenth season of Indonesian Idol. In both competitions, Lyodra demonstrated the use of the whistle register. She was listed as the youngest Indonesian Idol champion at the age of 16 years and 256 days. Lyodra was awarded Best Children Female Solo Artist from the 20th Anugerah Musik Indonesia Awards, and Best New Asian Artist in Indonesia from the 2021 Mnet Asian Music Award. In addition, she was nominated for Best Southeast Asian Act at the 2021 MTV Europe Music Awards.

Along with her music career, she has started to explore acting, where she made her debut in the web series, 7 Hari Sebelum 17 Tahun (2021).

== Early life and education ==
Lyodra was born Lyodra Margareta Ginting on 21 June 2003 in Medan, North Sumatra. She was raised in a Catholic family and was given the baptismal name Margareta. Her first name, Lyodra, itself is a modification or another form of the female name in Hebrew, Liora, which means "Light". Lyodra is the eldest of two children, from entrepreneur Simar Ginting and psychiatric nurse Natalia Johanna Tarigan. She has a younger brother named Igyralo Ginting, who is two years her junior.

Lyodra's singing talents had already begun to show as young as 2 years old. When she was 4 years old, she had already been participating in local singing competitions in Medan City. According to her father, Lyodra was able to sing with a better vibrato technique than her peers, who had been training longer.

In 2013, Lyodra studied under Derta Purba, the vocal teacher of classical singer Putri Ayu Silaen. She also studied playing the organ while serving as a psalmist at mass at the Catholic Church of St. Francis of Assisi, Medan.

Apart from singing, Lyodra is also studying acting. She was a member of the theatre club while studying at St. Ignasius Junior High School, Medan. She also took piano class. After graduating from junior high school she continued to Santo Thomas 2 Senior High School, Medan. In 2021, Lyodra attended the Pelita Harapan University and majored in communication studies but resigned at the end of second semester.

== Career ==
=== 2014: Early career and Indonesian Mencari Bakat ===
Lyodra debuted as a child singer at Kirana Semen Indonesia 2014, hosted by enterprise SIG. After winning in the Medan-based regional round, which was held in she advanced to the finals in Jakarta, representing Medan. On 31 March 2014, at Djakarta Theater XXI, Central Jakarta, Lyodra took to the top four position in the finals, taking home the first prize.

On 1 August 2014, Lyodra appeared as a participant in the fourth season of Indonesia Mencari Bakat (2010), where she was eventually eliminated in the sixth round. After her elimination, Lyodra was signed to record label GUT Records, where she was chosen as one of the six members of a project group called Di Atas Rata-Rata 2 (DARR 2).

=== 2015–2017: Di Atas Rata-Rata 2 ===
Lyodra's DARR 2 activities included Java Jazz Festival 2016, which was held throughout 4–6 March at JIExpo Kemayoran; "Di Atas Rata-Rata 2: Bikin Konser" on 2 April 2016 at Ciputra Artpreneur; and the commemoration of on the 71st Independence Day of the Republic of Indonesia at Merdeka Palace. The latter two concerts were performed for governor Basuki Tjahaja Purnama and former president Joko Widodo respectively.

Lydora would go onto participate in Sanremo Junior 2017, in Sanremo, Italy at the Ariston Cinema Building, where she participated in the A3 Category for children aged 6–15 years, sponsored by the Creative Economy Agency of the Republic of Indonesia. She became the winner of the A3 Category, beating nine participants from nine other countries and was selected as the only finalist to receive a special award from the committee, in the form of the "Prix of Sanremo Junior Committee" trophy. She performed Gita Gutawa's "Janji Untuk Mimpi" in English, as "Dear Dream", translated by Ria Leimena.

=== 2019–2020: Indonesian Idol and debut single "Gemintang Hatiku" ===
In 2019, Lyodra participated in Indonesian Idol. During the audition she performed Lady Gaga's song "I'll Never Love Again", and with her usage of the whistle register impressing the judges resulted in her reception of a golden ticket. Her audition video trended as first in YouTube Indonesia within the few hours of its release.

On 2 March 2020, she became the winner of the tenth season of Indonesian Idol, with her being the youngest winner in the history of Indonesian Idol at the age of 16 years, 8 months, and 15 days. Lyodra received the song "Gemintang Hatiku" as her prize, which became her first single as an adult singer. There are two versions of the song, with Lyodra singing the pop ballad version. The single won Lydora the award in Outstanding Newcomer in the 2020 Dahsyatnya Awards. After the show, Lyodra signed a contract with the record label Universal Music Indonesia and was managed by Star Media Nusantara, an artist management company owned by MNC Group.

Indonesian Idol season 10 performances and results
Week #	Song choice	Original artist	Order #	Result
Audition	"I'll Never Love Again"	Lady Gaga	N/A	Advanced
Top 23	"Rise Up"	Andra Day		Safe
Top 23	"I Have Nothing"	Whitney Houston		Safe
Top 23	"All by Myself"	Celine Dion		Safe
Top 23	"Sebuah Rasa"	Agnez Mo	6	Safe
Top 18	"7 Rings"	Ariana Grande		Safe
Top 15	"Menunggu Kamu"	Anji		Safe
Top 14	"Laksamana Raja di Laut"	Iyeth Bustami		Safe
Top 13	"Con te partirò (Time to Say Goodbye)"	Andrea Bocelli		Safe
Top 12	"Symphoni yang Indah"	Bob Tutupoly		Safe
Top 11	"It's All Coming Back to Me Now"	Pandora's Box		Safe
Top 10	"Till It Hurts"	Yellow Claw & Ayden		Safe
Top 9	"I Will Survive"	Gloria Gaynor		Safe
Top 8	"Rekayasa Cinta"	Camelia Malik		Safe
Top 7	"Into the Unknown"	Idina Menzel & Aurora		Safe
Top 6	"Side to Side"	Ariana Grande & Nicki Minaj		Safe
Top 5	"The Prayer"	Andrea Bocelli & Celine Dion		Safe
Top 5	"Jikalau Kau Cinta"	Judika		Safe
Top 4	"Bukti"	Virgoun		Safe
Top 4	"Secret Love Song"	Little Mix & Jason Derulo		Safe
Top 3	"Jangan Rubah Takdirku"	Andmesh Kamaleng	Grand	Winner
Top 3	"Cinta Kan Membawamu Kembali"	Dewa 19	Grand	Winner
Top 3	"I'd Do Anything for Love"	Meat Loaf	Grand	Winner
Top 3	"Gemintang Hatiku" (Note: Winning song of the tenth season of Indonesian Idol was composed by Laleilmanino.)	Lyodra Ginting	Grand	Winner
Finale	"Biring Manggis" "Sik Sik Sibatumanikam" "And I Am Telling You I'm Not Going"	Trio Lamtama North Sumatra Jennifer Holliday	Finale	Winner

=== 2021: Acting debut and solo album Lyodra ===
On 14 February 2021, a seven-episode teen drama web series, 7 Hari Sebelum 17 Tahun, aired on the media service provider application for the digital channel Stro, in which Lyodra made her acting debut in as an antagonist named Gina, a temperamental high school student. The series was named one of the best television shows in Asia by NME Asia Magazine.

On 16 July 2021, Lyodra released her first studio album, eponymously named, Lyodra, which contained eight singles, four of which being new. In this album, she collaborated with musicians Dipha Barus, Ade Nurulianto, Anji, Yovie Widianto, Mario Gerardus Klau, Tohpati, and Laleilmanino; whom helped composed and produced the album. This marked her debut as an adult singer under Universal Music Indonesia. The album was declared as one of the most recommended Asian albums by The Victor Magazine.

In October 2021, Lyodra was nominated as "Best Southeast Asian Act" from the 2021 MTV Europe Music Awards held on 14 November 2021, at the László Papp Budapest Sports Arena, beating out JJ Lin in votes.

In November 2021, Lyodra represented Indonesia at Expo 2020 in Al Wasl Plaza, Dubai.

Lyodra was also highlighted by Spotify as Artist of the Month and was also featured in Times Square's digital billboard in New York City for the November 2021 for the Equal campaign program.

In December 2021, Lyodra's debut album won the Album of the Year award from 2021 Indonesian Music Awards which was held at Studio RCTI+. On 11 December 2021, Lyodra won the award for Best New Asian Artist at the 2021 Mnet Asian Music Awards.

=== 2022: Collaboration with Calum Scott and "Sang Dewi" ===
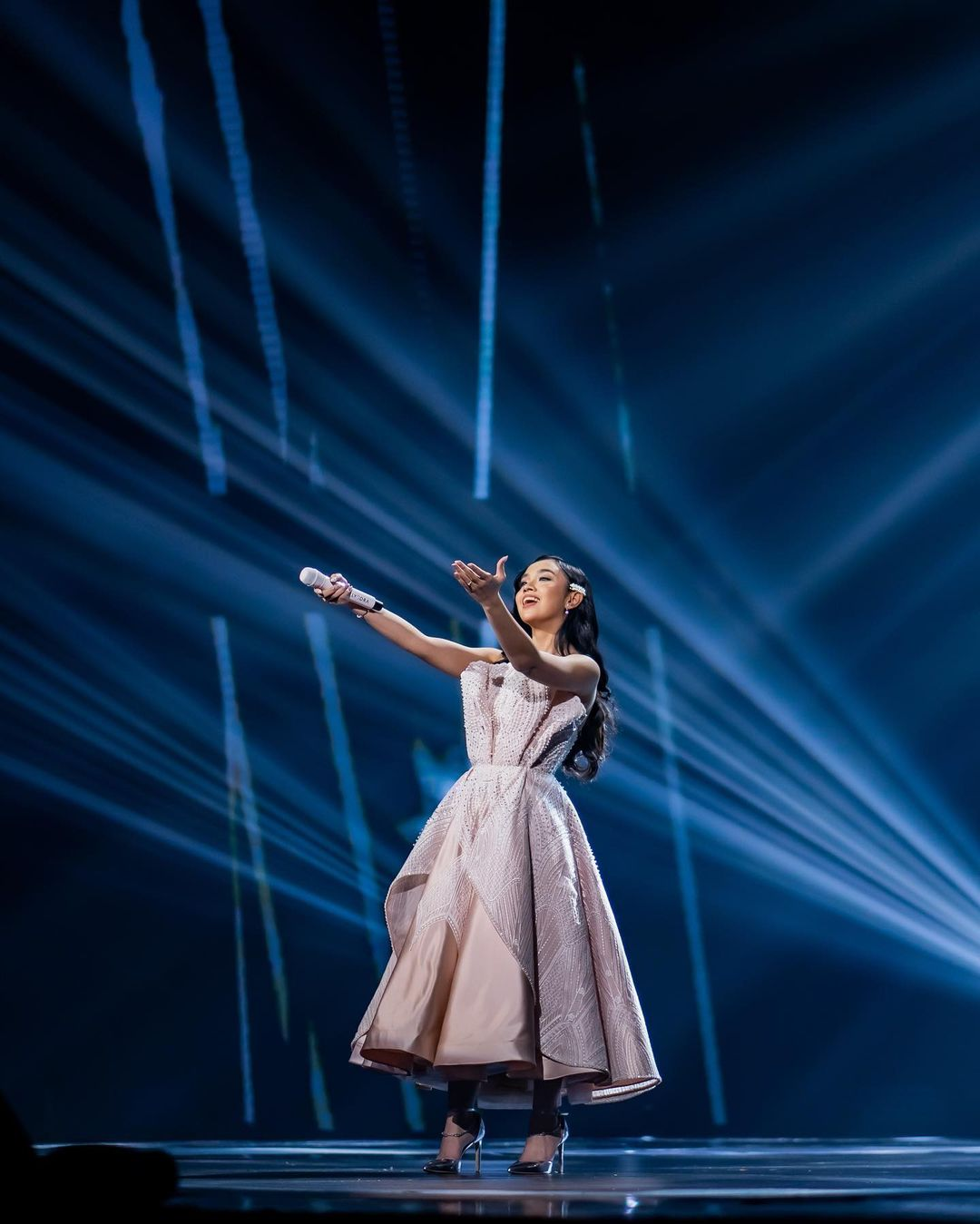
Lyodra at Rossa 25th Year Concert in 2022

In 2022, Lyodra was awarded the Musician of the Year award by TikTok. Lyodra was also listed in the "Outstanding Young People" from Forbes 30 Under 30 Indonesia magazine for 2022.

On 3 June 2022, Lyodra announced that she would be collaborating with British musician, Calum Scott. The collaboration is Calum Scott's project to promote one of his songs, "Heaven" for his album, Bridges.

On 7 June 2022, through the official Instagram page of Idola Cilik, Lyodra was chosen to be one of the guest judges in the talent search event with Judika and Aurel Hermansyah. The program aired commercially through RCTI TV channel on 13 June 2022.

On 12 August 2022, Lyodra released a single with Andi Rianto entitled "Sang Dewi", a remake of Titi DJ's version from 2001, marking Lyodra's first collaboration with an Indonesian musician.

On 7 November 2022, Lyodra was confirmed to be performing at the Asia Artist Awards (AAA) 2022 by the event's Twitter account. The event was held on 13–14 December 2022 in Japan, where Lyodra won the Asia Celebrity Awards category. The award is Lyodra's third international award after Sanremo Junior 2017 and 2021 Mnet Asian Music Awards.

=== 2023: "Ego" and "Menyesal" ===
On February 10, 2023, Lyodra released a single, titled "Ego". Later that year, on March 3, she collaborated with Tiara Andini and Ziva Magnolya to release a song titled "Menyesal", produced and accompanied by Yovie Widianto for his album project,Yovie & His Friend. "Menyesal" is a remake of the original song with same title from Ressa Herlambang, whose released the original version in 2012.

=== 2024–present: Melangkah ===
On September 26, 2024, Lyodra announced her second studio album, Melangkah, which was released digitally on October 11, 2024. It is her first full-length studio album release since Lyodra.

== Artistry ==
=== Influence ===
On several occasions, Lyodra has cited Beyoncé, Jessie J, Bruno Mars and Ariana Grande as her musical inspirations. In particular, she cites Beyoncé's "Listen" as a song that she often sings, because it has had a "positive influence" on her. She has said to have been a fan of Mariah Carey, Céline Dion, Whitney Houston and Christina Aguilera since she was in junior high school. She also once said that Agnez Mo was an inspirational figure for her. In addition, other singers such as Raisa, Rossa, Judika, Once Mekel, Dua Lipa, and Billie Eilish also indirectly influenced her musical style.

=== Musical style and voice ===
"Lyodra is one of the smartest artists I have ever worked with. She understands how to put her skills to use. There are lots of singers in this country who are gifted with a skillful voice, but when it comes to performing an original song, they tend to be all over the place. Lyodra, on the other hand, is one of the artists who can use her skills wisely. Plus she has a good attitude, especially considering her young age."

— Ade Govinda, one of Lyodra's former producers, 2022

Lyodra is a soprano. She is best known as a pop singer; the first three singles in her career as an adult singer were primarily pop ballads—"Gemintang Hatiku", "Mengapa Kita Terlanjur Mencinta" and "Tentang Kamu". In addition to pop ballads, she has also explored R&B and EDM in "Sabda Rindu" and "Oee.. Oee... Oee". In "Sabda Rindu", the single utilizes riffs and runs found in R&B; in "Oee.. Oee... Oee", the EDM song explores the usage of the Karo traditional instruments.

Critics have described Lyodra as a powerhouse in terms of vocals, with Salman Achmad of Hai writing that Lyodra "has the power of a voice to reach high notes" and "her vocal character is very strong". Diana Rafikasari from Sindonews described Lyodra as a singer who is "very capable of processing slow tempo songs". Lyodra's ability to sing with the whistle register was found to be self-taught as far back as junior high, where she had imitated Mariah Carey's use of the whistle register in the song "O Holy Night". She has admitted experiencing damage to her vocal cords in 2016 due to excessive singing using the whistle register. Stylistically, she was noted to have adopted Beyoncé's hoarse voice in her single "Mengapa Kita Terlanjur Mencinta".

== Discography ==
=== Studio album ===
List of studio albums with selected details
Title	Album Detail	Ref.
Lyodra	Release: 16 July 2021; Label: Universal Music Indonesia; Format: CD, digital download, streaming	
Melangkah	Release: 11 October 2024; Label: Universal Music Indonesia; Format: CD, digital download, streaming	

=== Compilation album ===
List of compilation albums with selected details
Title	Detail Album	Ref.
Di Atas Rata-Rata 2	Release: 17 April 2015; Label: GUT Records, Kompas Gramedia; Format: CD, Digital download	
Musik Anak Terbaik: Di Atas Rata-Rata	Release: 27 July 2017; Label: GUT Records, Jagonya Musik & Sport Indonesia; Format: CD, Digital download	
Berlin and Friends	Releases: 31 October 2019; Label: Bragiri Record; Format: Digital download	(Note: "Berlin and Friends" is a compilation album in regional languages released by record label Bragiri Records.)
Musikini Super Hits 2	Release: 21 April 2021; Label: Jagonya Musik & Sport Indonesia; Format: CD	(Note: Singel Lyodra yang berjudul "Mengapa Kita Terlanjur Mencinta" (ditulis dengan gaya "Mengapa Kita #terlanjurmencinta") terpilih sebagai salah satu lagu yang mengisi daftar trek album kompilasi Musikini Super Hits 2, di samping karya sembilan musisi lain.)

=== Single ===
Title	Year	Highest Position	Album	Ref.
Title	Year	IDN Songs	Album	Ref.
Dear Dream	2017	-	Non-album singles	(Note: The song "Dear Dream" is an English translated version of the song "Janji Untuk Mimpi", translated in order to participate in the 2017 Sanremo Junior competition in Italy.)
Gemintang Hatiku	2020	17	Lyodra	(Note: "Gemintang Hatiku" is a song that was prepared as a victory song for Lyodra in the 10th season of Indonesian Idol. This song is Lyodra's first single as an adult singer under the Universal Music Indonesia label, as well as the first single written and produced by Laleilmanino.)
Mengapa Kita #TerlanjurMencinta	2020	-	Lyodra	(Note: Usually written in the style of "Mengapa Kita #TerlanjurMencinta". This song has three versions with the last two words in common in the title section, each popularized by Lyodra, Tiara Andini, and Ziva Magnolya.)
Tentang Kamu	2020	-	Lyodra	(Note: The single "Tentang Kamu" became theme song in the first episode of the web teen drama series 7 Hari Sebelum 17 Tahun, which also starred Lyodra.)
Pesan Terakhir	2021	10	Lyodra	(Note: The single "Pesan Akhir" was written by Mario Gerardus Klau, winner of The Voice Indonesia second season. This song was written in 2017 and is Mario G Klau's debut as songwriter.)
Sabda Rindu	2021	-	Lyodra	(Note: The single with the same title belongs to the late.Glenn Fredly. Lyodra's "Sabda Rindu" is the second song composed and produced by Laleilmanino.)
Kalau Bosan	2021	-	Lyodra	
Dibanding Dia	2021	-	Lyodra	
Oe..Oe..Oe	2021	-	Lyodra	
Heaven (featuring Calum Scott)	2022		Non-album singles	(Note: "Heaven" is one of the songs belonging to musicians from British with multi-platinum single, Calum Scott. This song was sung again by Calum Scott and has 4 duet versions, each of which was popularized by Lyodra (Indonesia), Diana Danielle (Malaysia), Darren Espanto (Philippines), and Hoàng Duyên (Vietnamese).)
Sang Dewi (featuring Andi Rianto)	2022	1	Non-album singles	(Note: The song "Sang Dewi" is the result of a rearrangement of the song of the same name which was popularized by Titi DJ in 2001, where Andi Rianto, as one of the creators of this song, also collaborated with Lyodra.)
Ego	2023		Non-album singles	
Tak Dianggap	2023		Non-album singles	
Ada (featuring Afgan)	2023		Non-album singles	(Note: The song "Ada" is a single collaboration with Indonesian singer Afgan. They will also have their first collaboration concert, "ADA in Kuala Lumpur," on September 28, 2024.)
Tak Selalu Memiliki	2024	9	OST Ipar Adalah Maut	
Terlalu Cinta (featuring Yovie Widianto)	2024		Non-album singles	(Note: Lyodra collaborated with composer Yovie Widianto to recycle the 2006 song "Terlalu Cinta," originally performed by Rossa.)

As a featured singer
Title	Year	Highest Position	Album	Ref.
Title	Year	IDN Songs	Album	Ref.
Damaikan Dunia (as part of 25 musicians Universal Music Indonesia and Def Jam Indonesia)	2020	-	Non-album singles	
"Indonesia Jaya" (as part of the eight finalists Indonesian Idol tenth season)	2020	-	Non-album singles	
Menyesal (Yovie Widianto featuring Lyodra, Tiara Andini & Ziva Magnolya)	2023	6	Non-album singles	
"Glorious" -The Official Song of 2023 FIFA U-20 World Cup	2023	-	Non-album singles	(Weird Genius featuring Lyodra, Tiara Andini, Ziva Magnolya)

=== Songwriting credits ===
Year	Artist	Song	Album	Lyricist	Credited with
2021	Herself, Dipha Barus	"Oe..Oe..Oe..	Lyodra	Yes	Dipha Barus, Monica Karina, Matter Mos
2024	Herself	"Malu Malu Tapi Nyaman"	Melangkah	Yes	Clara Riva, S/EEK
2024	Herself	"Sana Sini Mau"	Melangkah	Yes	Clara Riva, S/EEK
2024	Herself, Andi Rianto	"Jangan Pernah Kembali"	Melangkah	Yes	Andi Rianto

== Filmography ==
=== Film ===
Year	Title	Role	Notes	Ref.
2023	Why Do You Love Me	Karmila		

=== Web series ===
Year	Title	Role	Notes	Ref.
2021	7 Hari Sebelum 17 Tahun	Gina	Supporting role	

=== Television show ===
Year	Title	Role	Notes
2019 - 2020	Indonesian Idol	Contestant	Season 10; 22 episodes
2022	X Factor Indonesia	Guest Star	Season 3; episode: "Final Countdown and Result Show"
2022	The Voice: All-Stars (Indonesia)	Guest Star	Season 1; episode: "Knockout Episode 6"
2022	Rising Star Indonesia Dangdut	Guest Star	Season 1; episode: "Final Stage Top 3"
2022	Idola Cilik	Co-Judge	Season 6; 3 episodes
2022	The Indonesian Next Big Star	Guest star	Season 1; 1 episode

== Awards and nominations ==
Year	Nominee / work	Award	Result^{[1]}	Ref.
2016
2016	Best Children's Music Duo/Group/Vocal/Collaboration / "Stop Bully" (feat. Olivola) (Note: Lyodra acts as lead artist on "Stop Bully" alongside Olivola sibling duo. They were nominated together as a trio.)	AMI Awards	Nominated	
2017
2017	Outstanding Child Artist / "Stop Bully" (feat. Olivola) (Note: Lyodra acts as lead artist on "Stop Bully" alongside Olivola sibling duo. They were nominated together as a trio.)	Dahsyatnya Awards 2017	Nominated	
2017	Best Children Female Solo Artist / "Dear Dream"	AMI Awards	Won	
2020
2020	Outstanding Newcomer	Dahsyatnya Awards 2020	Won	
2020	Outstanding Gang (Note: The gang (stylized as genk on the award shortlists) referred to the group of top three finalists of the tenth season of Indonesian Idol: Lyodra, runner-up Tiara Andini, and third place Ziva Magnolya. They were nominated together as the Idol Gang, alongside another two celebrity groups.)	Dahsyatnya Awards 2020	Won	
2020	Most Favorite Celebrity Live Chat (Note: Lyodra was nominated alongside Tiara Andini. The award was originally named Most Favorite Live Chat Plus Seleb. Live Chat Plus Seleb is a feature that allows users to join interactive live video chat with various celebrities on RCTI+ mobile application. Lyodra and Tiara lost the award to Beby, Feni, and Shani from the JKT48 musical group.)	RCTI+ Indonesian Digital Awards	Nominated	
2020	Digital Darling Female Rider	RCTI+ Indonesian Digital Awards	Nominated	
2020	Best Newcomer Singer	Silet Awards	Nominated	
2020	Best Pop Female Solo Singer / "Mengapa Kita Terlanjur Mencinta"	AMI Awards	Nominated	
2021	Most Obsessed Young Celebrity	Obsesi Awards 2021	Nominated	
2021	Best Southeast Asian Act	2021 MTV Europe Music Awards	Nominated	
2021	Best Pop Female Solo Artist / "Tentang Kamu"	AMI Awards	Nominated	
2021	Voice of Clarity	The Masterpiece & I Fashion Festival 2021	Won	
2021	Album of the Year / Lyodra	Indonesian Music Awards 2021	Won	
2021	Female Singer of the Year / "Pesan Terakhir"	Indonesian Music Awards 2021	Nominated	
2021	Social Media Artist of the Year / "Pesan Terakhir"	Indonesian Music Awards 2021	Nominated	
2021	Best New Asian Artist (Indonesia)	2021 Mnet Asian Music Awards	Won	
2021	Most Favorite Indonesian Singer	Line Today Choice 2021	Won	
2021	Uprising Singer of the Year	Go Spot Awards 2021	Won	
2022	Musician of the Year	TikTok Awards Indonesia 2021	Won	
2022	Most Popular Female Solo Singer	SCTV Music Awards 2022	Nominated	
2022	Most Popular Pop Songs "Pesan Terakhir"	SCTV Music Awards 2022	Nominated	
2022	Most Popular Female Solo Pop Singer	Bandung Music Awards 2022	Won	
2022	Most Popular Newcomer Singer	Bandung Music Awards 2022	Nominated	
2022	Most Popular Video Clip	Bandung Music Awards 2022	Won	
2022	Most Popular Songs	Bandung Music Awards 2022	Won	
2022	Best-Best Album	Anugerah Musik Indonesia 2022	Nominated	
2022	Best Pop Album	Anugerah Musik Indonesia 2022	Nominated	
2022	Best Female Pop Solo Artist	Anugerah Musik Indonesia 2022	Nominated	
2022	The Best Production Works	Anugerah Musik Indonesia 2022	Nominated	
2022	Most Popular Television Drama Soundtracks (Pesan Terakhir - Cinta 2 Pilihan)	SCTV Awards 2022	Won	
2022	Female Singer of the Year	Anugerah Musik Indonesia 2022	Nominated	
2022	Collaboration of The Year (Sang Dewi)	Anugerah Musik Indonesia 2022	Won	
2022	Asia Celebrity Award — Music	7th Asia Artist Awards	Won	
2023	Best Collaboration - Menyesal	Anugerah Musik Indonesia 2023	Won	
2023	Best Re-Arrangement Production Work (Sang Dewi with Andi Rianto	Anugerah Musik Indonesia 2023	Won	
2023	Lagu Recycle Terpopuler "Kategori Umum" (Sang Dewi with Andi Rianto	Bandung Musik Award	Won	
2023	Lagu Terpopuler "Kategori Umum" (Sang Dewi with Andi Rianto	Bandung Musik Award	Nominated	
2023	Penyanyi Solo Terpopuler "Kategori Umum"	Bandung Musik Award	Nominated	
2023	Duo/Group/Kolaborasi Pop Terpopuler "Kategori Pop"(Sang Dewi with Andi Rianto	Bandung Musik Award	Won	
2023	Duo/Group/Kolaborasi Pop Terpopuler "Kategori Pop" (Menyesal with Yovie Widianto, Ziva Magnolya, Tiara Andini	Bandung Musik Award	Nominated	
2023	Lagu Terdahsyat (Menyesal with Yovie Widianto, Ziva Magnolya, Tiara Andini	Dahsyatnya Award 2023	Won	
2023	Lagu Terdahsyat (Sang Dewi with Andi Rianto)	Dahsyatnya Award 2023	Nominated	
2023	Selebriti Wanita Terobsesi	Obsesi Award	Won	
2023	Most Popular Female Singer	SCTV Music Awards 2023	Nominated	
2023	Most Popular Pop Songs (Sang Dewi with Andi Rianto)	SCTV Music Awards 2023	Won	
2023	Most Popular Video Clip (Sang Dewi with Andi Rianto)	SCTV Music Awards 2023	Nominated	
2023	Most Popular Collaboration (Sang Dewi with Andi Rianto)	SCTV Music Awards 2023	Won	
2023	Favourite Content Creator	TikTok Awards Indonesia	Won	
2023	The Serenade Siren	Buddy Talk Award	Won	
2024	Selebriti Wanita Terobsesi	Obsesi Award 2024	Won	
2024	Most Popular Female Solo Singer	SCTV Music Award 2024	Won	
2024	Most Popular Pop Songs (Tak Dianggap)	SCTV Music Award 2024	Won	
2024	Most Popular Video Clip (Ada with Afgan)	SCTV Music Award 2024	Won	
2024	Most Popular Collaboration (Ada with Afgan)	SCTV Music Award 2024	Won	
2024	Karya Produksi Original Soundtrack Terbaik (Tak Selalu Memiliki - Ipar Adalah Maut Original Soundtrack)	Anugerah Musik Indonesia 2024	Won	
2024	Top Female Artist of the Year	Spotify Wrapped Live Indonesia 2024	#4	
2024	Top Song of the Year (Tak Dianggap)	Spotify Wrapped Live Indonesia 2024	#5	
2024	Top Song of the Year (Pesan Terakhir)	Spotify Wrapped Live Indonesia 2024	#3	

1. There are several awards with several recipients, including Indonesia's Beautiful Women 2021. For the simplicity and to avoid error/mistakes, the other awards are listed in the "Special Awards" menu.

=== Special awards ===
- Lyodra received the award for one of Indonesia's Beautiful Women 2021 by HighEnd Magazine.
- Lyodra received "Best Dresser" with Krisdayanti at "Embracing Womanhood" IBW 2021 by HighEnd Magazine.
- Lyodra received Spotify Wrapped ID 2021 Awards.
