= Indonesian Idol season 10 =

Indonesian Idol
- Season 10
- Hosted by: Daniel Mananta
- Judges: Anang Hermansyah; Ari Lasso; Judika; Bunga Citra Lestari; Maia Estianty
- Winner: Lyodra Ginting
- Runner-up: Tiara Anugrah

Release
- Original network: RCTI
- Original release: October 7, 2019 – March 2, 2020

Season chronology
- ← Previous; Season 9

The tenth season of Indonesian Idol premiered on RCTI on October 7, 2019, after a year hiatus and ended on March 2, 2020, coinciding with the early rise of COVID-19 pandemic in Indonesia. The main audition process was held in five major cities in Indonesia: Bandung, Yogyakarta, Surabaya, Medan and Jakarta. This season marks as the first season to have an all-female Top 3 in Indonesian Idol history, and the second season to have an all-female finale since season 7. The winner of the season was 16-year-old Lyodra Ginting, who became the fourth female Indonesian Idol winner in a row since season 7.

== Hosts and judges ==
=== Host & Co-host ===
- Daniel Mananta
- Sere Kalina

=== Judges ===
The judges were :

- Ari Lasso
- Anang Hermansyah
- Bunga Citra Lestari
- Judika
- Maia Estianty

== Schedule auditions ==
=== Regional auditions ===
Cities audition	Date	Location	Golden tickets
Yogyakarta	26-27 Juni 2019	Jogja Expo Center	
Medan	6-7 Juli 2019	Medan International Convention Center	
Surabaya	20-21 Juli 2019	BK3S Convention Center	
Bandung	24-25 Juli 2019	Sasana Budaya Ganesha	
Jakarta	27 & 29 Juli 2019	MNC Studios	
Total number of golden tickets for elimination round			104

Terms contestants: Contestants must be 16–27 years old and lived in Indonesia

== Elimination round ==
The first day of the elimination round featured the 113 contestants from the auditions round singing solo a cappella. 51 contestants advanced. The next round required the contestants to split up into 10 groups and perform the same song. 31 of them advanced to the finals of the elimination round requiring a solo performance with a full band. 23 of them made it to the Top 23 show where the judges take contestants one by one and tell them if they made the final 23.

== Semi-finals ==
=== Showcase Round ===
The top 22 Show was divided into two nights and aired live on 4 and 5 November 2019 at 9:00 p.m. The contestants performed songs of their choice (there was no particular theme) with thirteen contestants performed on the first night, and the other performed on the second night along with the result. Ten contestants with most vote advanced automatically to the Spectacular Show, and then each judges would pick one contestant left to compete along the Top 10. There were 22 semi-finalists, thirteen females and nine males.

==== Showcase Round 1 (4 November 2019) ====
Order	Contestant	Song (Original Artist)	Result
1	Raja Giannuca	"Lost In Japan" (Shawn Mendes)	BCL's choice
2	Mahalini Raharja	"Bukan Cinta Biasa" (Afgan)	Ari's choice
3	Novia Bachmid	"Breathin" (Ariana Grande)	Maia's choice
4	Keisya Levronka	"Fly Me To The Moon" (Kaye Ballard)	Advanced
5	Ziva Magnolya	"Unaware" (Allen Stone)	Advanced
6	Lyodra Ginting	"Sebuah Rasa" (Agnez Mo)	Anang's choice
7	Daniel Simanjuntak	"Wonderwall" (Oasis)	Eliminated
8	Richard Jeremy	"Jealous" (Labrinth)	Advanced
9	Dery Ariska	"Aku Disini Untukmu" (Ari Lasso)	Eliminated
10	Alda Wiyekedella	"Terlalu Cinta" (Rossa)	Advanced
11	Tiara Anugrah	"New York, New York" (Frank Sinatra)	Advanced
12	Samuel Cipta	"Heaven" (Afgan, Isyana Sarasvati, Rendy Pandugo)	Anang's choice
13	Sonny Saragih	"Creep" (Radiohead)	Eliminated

==== Showcase Round 2 (5 November 2019) ====
Order	Contestant	Song (Original Artist)	Result
1	Shafira Putri	"Something's Got a Hold on Me" (Etta James)	Eliminated
2	Zwingly Tanauma	"Jump" (Van Halen)	Advanced
3	Esther Geraldine	"Irreplaceable" (Beyoncé)	Judika's Choice
4	Mirabeth Sonia	"Say Something" (A Great Big World & Christina Aguilera)	BCL's Choice
5	Ola Elannor	"Friends" (Marshmello & Anne-Marie)	Ari's Choice
6	Agseisa Galuh	"Andai Aku Bisa" (Chrisye)	Maia's Choice
7	Olivia Pardede	"God Bless the Child" (Billie Holiday)	Advanced
8	Dian Amanda	"I Don't Want to Miss a Thing" (Aerosmith)	Judika's Choice
9	Ainun Irsani	"Without You" (Badfinger)	Advanced

== Elimination chart ==
Females	Males	Top 23	Top 15	Wild Card	Winner

Did Not Participate	Top Vote	Safe First	Safe Last	Eliminated	Judges' Save

Place	Contestant	Top 23	Top 18	Top 15	Top 14	Top 13	Top 12	Top 11	Top 10	Top 9	Top 8	Top 7	Top 6	Top 5	Top 4	Top 3	Finale
Place	Contestant	4 - 5/11	11 - 12/11	18/11	25/11	2/12	9/12	16/12	23/12	6/1	13/1	20/1	27/1	3/2	10/2	17/2	2/3
1	Lyodra Ginting	Safe	Safe	Safe	Safe	Safe	Safe	Safe	Safe	Safe	Safe	Safe	Safe	Safe	Safe	Safe	Winner
2	Tiara Anugrah	Safe	Safe	Safe	Safe	Safe	Safe	Safe	Safe	Safe	Safe	Safe	Safe	Safe	Safe	Safe	Runner-up
3	Ziva Magnolya	Safe	Safe	Safe	Safe	Safe	Safe	Safe	Safe	Safe	Safe	Safe	Safe	Safe	Safe	Elim	
4	Raja Giannuca	Safe	Safe	Safe	Safe	Safe	Safe	Safe	Safe	Safe	Safe	Safe	Safe	Safe	Elim		
5	Mahalini Raharja	Safe	Safe	Safe	Safe	Safe	Safe	Safe	Safe	Safe	Safe	Safe	Safe	Elim			
6	Mirabeth Sonia	Safe	Safe	Safe	Safe	Safe	Safe	Safe	Safe	Safe	Safe	Safe	Elim				
7	Ainun Irsani	Safe	Safe	Safe	Safe	Safe	Safe	Safe	Safe	Safe	Safe	Elim					
8	Novia Bachmid	Safe	Safe	Safe	Safe	Safe	Safe	Safe	Safe	Safe	Elim						
9	Agseisa Putri	Safe	Safe	Safe	Safe	Safe	Safe	Safe	Safe	Elim							
10	Samuel Cipta	Safe	Safe	Safe	Safe	Safe	Safe	Safe	Elim								
11	Richard Jeremy	Safe	Safe	Safe	Safe	Safe	Safe	Elim									
12	Keisya Levronka	Safe	Safe	Safe	Safe	Safe	Elim										
13	Ola Elannor	Safe	Safe	Safe	Safe	Elim											
14	Olivia Pardede	Safe	Safe	Safe	Elim												
15	Alda Wiyekedella	Safe	Safe	Elim													
16-18	Dian Amanda	Safe	Elim														
16-18	Esther Geraldine	Safe	Elim														
16-18	Zwingly Rinaldy	Safe	Elim														
19-23	Daniel Jonathan	Elim															
19-23	Dery Ariska	Elim															
19-23	Shafira Putri	Elim															
19-23	Sonny Saragih	Elim															
19-23	Prinsa Shafira	Elim															
