= Stacey Ryan =

Canadian singer (born 2000)

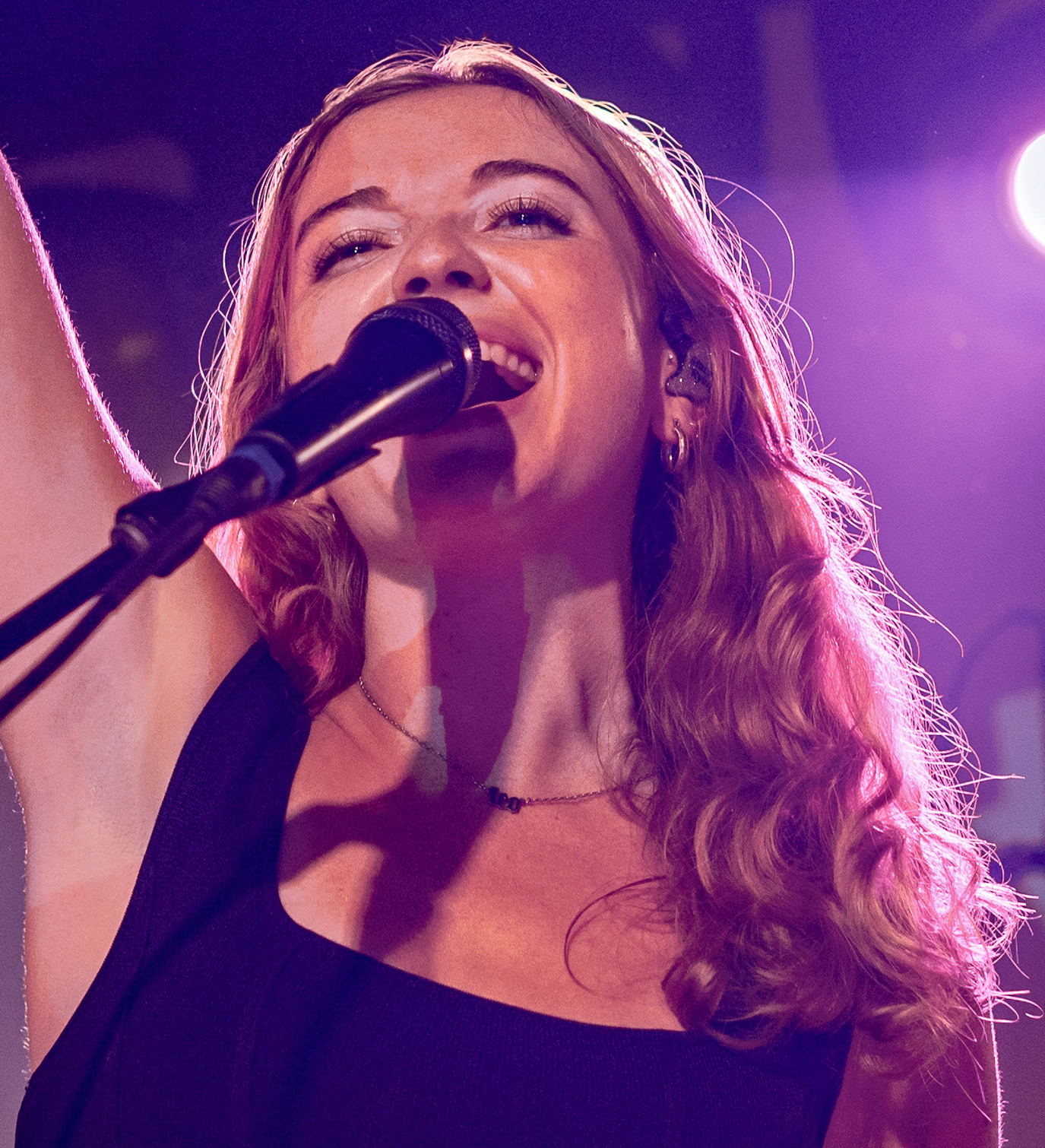
- At the Moroccan Lounge in 2022

Background information
- Born: August 18, 2000 (age 26); Montreal, Canada
- Origin: Montreal, Canada
- Genre: Jazz-pop
- Occupations: Singer; songwriter
- Instruments: Vocals; guitar; keyboard
- Years active: 2021–present
- Label: Island
- Website: www.staceyryanmusic.com

Stacey Ryan (born August 18, 2000) is a Canadian singer and songwriter. She initially received public attention in January 2022 after posting a snippet of her single, "Don't Text Me When You're Drunk", and asking users to finish the lyrics. Her subsequent single, "Fall in Love Alone", topped the Billboard's Indonesia Songs chart in 2022. She was signed to Island Records. She released her debut EP, I Don't Know What Love Is on April 7, 2023.

== Early life and education ==
Stacey Ryan was born and raised in Montreal, Quebec, Canada, in the suburban town of Vaudreuil-Dorion. Ryan was a trumpeter in École secondaire de la Cité-des-Jeunes' wind orchestra and jazz band. She graduated high school at the age of sixteen after which she enrolled in a three-year college program for jazz interpretation. Ryan studied voice and guitar while she was in college.

== Career ==
In December 2021, Ryan posted a clip of her then unfinished single, "Don't Text Me When You're Drunk", and offered an "open verse challenge", asking users to finish the song with their own lyrics. Around 40,000 users created duets, contributing to hundreds of millions of views on the app. In an episode of The Tonight Show, host Jimmy Fallon sang his own verse to the song. Ryan was signed to Island Records, and, in January 2022, she released a studio version of the song with Zai1k, a musical artist and TikTok user who had collaborated with her open verse challenge.

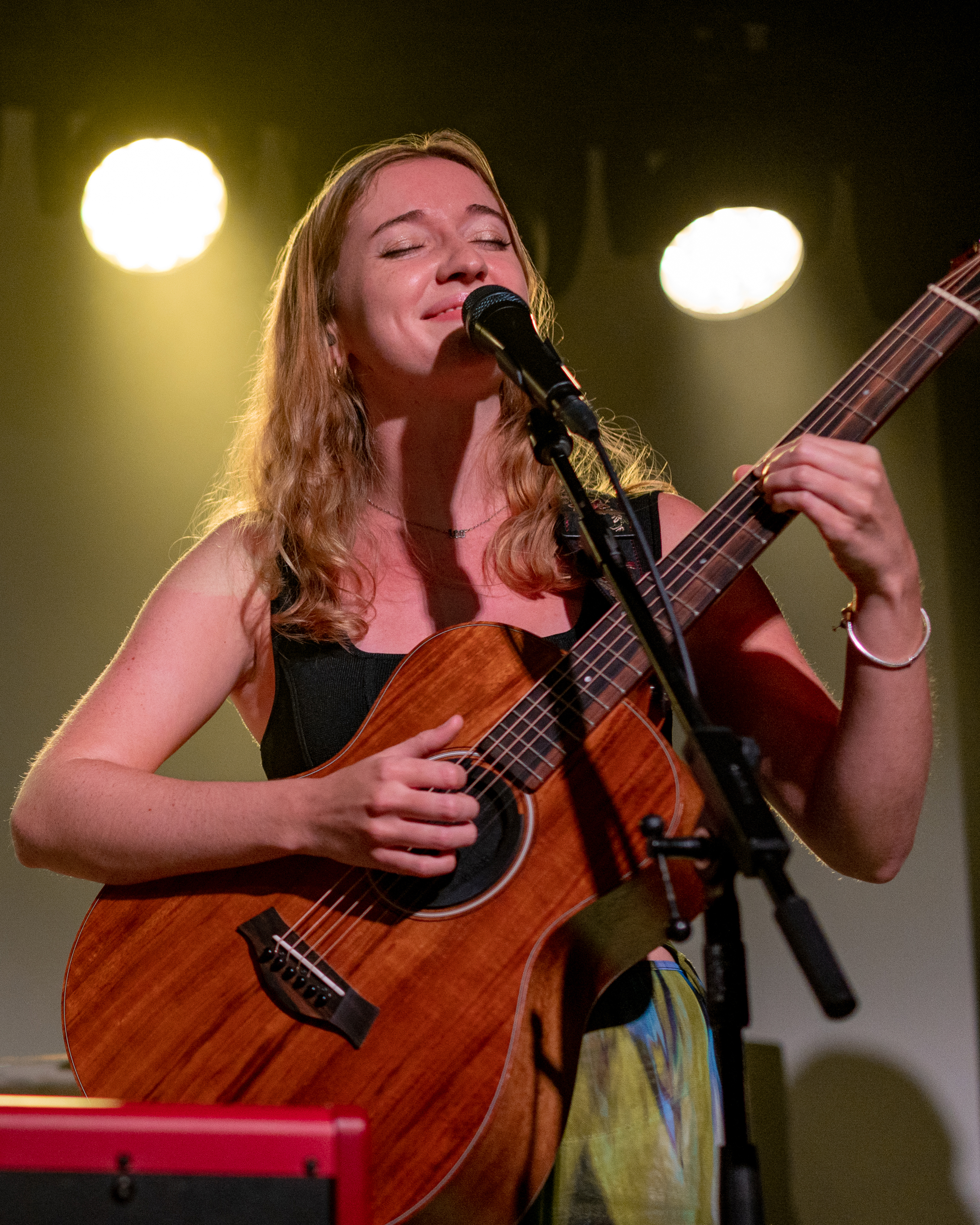
Ryan in 2022

In spring 2022, Ryan toured with the band Lawrence. It was also announced that she would be an opener on Joshua Bassett's Fall 2022 world tour, which was later postponed to Spring 2023. In May of the same year, she released the single, "Fall in Love Alone", which would eventually ranked first at the Billboard Indonesia Songs chart later in the year. In July 2022, Ryan performed at the Montreal International Jazz Festival. The following month, she released her third single, entitled "Deep End". In November 2022, Ryan embarked on a mall tour of Southeast Asia, including the Philippines and Indonesia. A remix of "Fall in Love Alone" featuring Indonesian artist Ziva Magnolya was released that month. She also opened for Duran Duran in 2022.

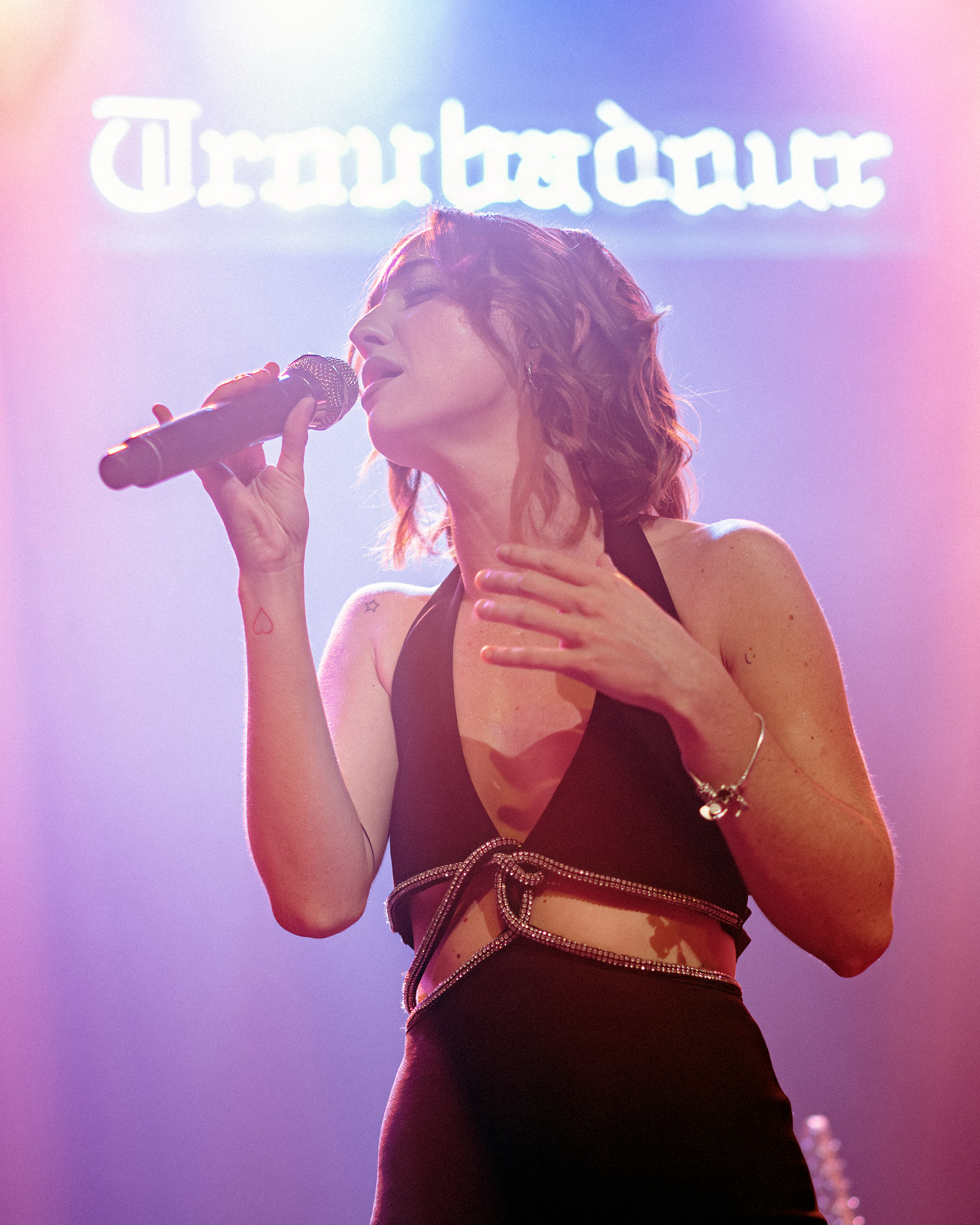
Ryan in 2025, performing at Troubadour

In 2024, Ryan revealed that she was dropped by her label. She then signed with TikTok's SoundOn Distribution to distribute her music to streaming platforms. On February 3, 2025, Ryan announced on Instagram her first single released as an independent artist, "Everything Everything", would be coming March 7 of that same year. She announced on June 30, 2025 that her debut album would be released on August 15, 2025, titled Blessing in Disguise.

Prior to the album's release, Ryan released five singles: "Everything Everything", "Homewrecker", "Good to Be Alone", "Sweet Talker", and "Bad Omen". The day before its release, Ryan premiered the music video for the opening track of her album, "Montréal", through YouTube. On August 15, she released her debut studio album, Blessing in Disguise. She would subsequently begin her first headline tour in September 2025 in support of the album; Haven Madison and the Collarbones were announced as openers for the tour.

== Discography ==
=== Studio albums ===
List of studio albums
Title	Details
Blessing in Disguise	Released: August 15, 2025; Label: Independent; Formats: Digital download, streaming

=== Extended plays ===
List of extended plays
Title	Details
I Don't Know What Love Is	Released: April 7, 2023; Label: Island; Formats: Digital download, streaming

=== Singles ===
List of singles as lead artist, showing year released, peak chart positions and album name
Title	Year	Peak chart positions			Album(s)
Title	Year	IND	KOR	SUR	Album(s)
"Bust Your Windows" (with Jay Webb)	2020	—	—	—	Non-album single
"Dancing Queen"	2021	—	—	—	Non-album single
"Just the Two of Us"	2021	—	—	—	Non-album single
"Don't Text Me When You're Drunk" (with Zai1k)	2022	—	—	—	Non-album single
"Fall in Love Alone"	2022	1	156	21	I Don't Know What Love Is
"Deep End"	2022	—	—	—	I Don't Know What Love Is
"Over Tonight"	2023	—	—	—	I Don't Know What Love Is
"Bad for Me"	2023	—	—	—	I Don't Know What Love Is
"Dream Boy"	2023	—	—	—	Non-album single
"Baby It's Not Christmas without You"	2023	—	—	—	Non-album single
"River"	2024	—	—	—	Non-album single
"Everything Everything"	2025	—	—	—	Blessing in Disguise
"Like Someone in Love"	2025	—	—	—	Non-album single
"Homewrecker"	2025	—	—	—	Blessing in Disguise
"Good to Be Alone"	2025	—	—	—	Blessing in Disguise
"Sweet Talker"	2025	—	—	—	Blessing in Disguise
"Bad Omen"	2025	—	—	—	Blessing in Disguise
"It's Christmas" (with Eric Benét)	2025	—	—	—	Non-album single
"Wish Song"	2026	—	—	—	Non-album single
"—" denotes items which were not released in that country or failed to chart.
