= Amanah Wali =

Indonesian television series

- Genre: Drama; Religion; Comedy
- Created by: MNC Pictures
- Starring: Wali Band
- Theme music composer: Wali Band
- Opening theme: Wali Band - Various Songs
- Ending theme: Wali Band - Various Songs
- Composer: Joseph S. Djafar
- Country of origin: Indonesia
- Original language: Indonesian
- No. of seasons: 8
- No. of episodes: 1271

Production
- Editor: MNC Media
- Camera setup: Multi camera
- Running time: 60± Minutes
- Production company: MNC Pictures

Original release
- Network: RCTI
- Release: 27 May 2017 – 29 March 2026

Amanah Wali is an Indonesian soap opera produced by MNC Pictures which premiered on 27 May 2017, at 02.45 WIB on RCTI. The soap opera which directed by Azhar Kinoi Lubis, Reka Wijaya, Viva Westy Datuk, Kiky Zkr, Dedi Setiadi, Bobby Herlambang, Ronggur Sihombing, Yogi Yose, Indrawan, Haekal Rizky Pratama, Asep Kusdinar and Yorris Rumsayor this also starring Wali Band.

On May 3, 2020, this series underwent a story overhaul and changes in cast composition due to the appearance COVID-19 pandemic. The shooting location was also forced to be moved because conditions made it impossible to do it outdoors.

== Plot ==
=== Season 1 ===
Four young men who are still searching for their identity. Apoy the market thug, Tomy the illegal racer, Ovie the pickpocket, and Faank the punk busker. Their lives are far from normal, where each of them has their own unique side. Apoy which is a market champion, is very loud about extorting market traders for security reasons. However, behind that, he was always afraid and obedient after his mother's command voice was heard.

=== Season 2 ===
Apoy, Faank, Tomy, and Ovie, after leaving the Annur Islamic Boarding School were not free from various problems. Apoy was heartbroken because someone else proposed to Wiyanti. Tomy is also heartbroken because April left him for Paris to continue fashion school. Faank's father had a heart attack and die, because he misunderstood and thought that Faank was still involved in a brawl with gang of punk kids. Ovie business is hampered by his former student, now he works as an employee at Tomy's minimarket. However, he secretly stole money from the minimarket cashier to pay for his mother's medical expenses.

=== Season 3 ===
Bilal be told as an members of Yanto Kober Gang, just like Apoy. While carrying out his action, Bilal was caught by Ustaz Beling. Ustaz Beling immediately handed Bilal over to Faank. To be educated and nurtured of by Faank, until Bilal becomes a teenager who understands religious knowledge. But on the other hand, Faank has to face his own problems.

=== Season 4 ===
==== Early version during Ramadan ====
Apoy, Faank, Tomy, and Ovie who were carrying out their mandate on Ustaz Beling's orders, Ustaz Beling gave the mandate to the four of them to immediately go to Cisayong Village and meet Ustaz Dullah who is an Alumnus of the Annur Islamic Boarding School. Then, Ustaz Dullah asked the four of them for help, to help him in carry out the mandate given by Kyai Imron, namely increasing the faith of the Cisayong Village Community.

==== New version during Covid-19 Pandemic ====
Bondan asks Apoy for help, to help him in teach about religious knowledge the Traders and Thugs of Makmur Market who want to repent. In this market that sells used goods, Apoy, Faank, Tomy, and Ovie, take turns teaching five daily prayers and reading the Al-Qur'an to the Traders and Thugs of Makmur Market who are far from religious knowledge. However, not all Traders and Thugs repented, many also refused and felt threatened by Apoy's presence at Makmur Market. Besides that Apoy also had problems at Genjing Market, because there a new basic food trader named Mr. Yusuf. The way to trade is to mention capital and paying sincerely. This is the main reason some traders at Genjing Market to hate Mr. Yusuf, while other basic food traders think that Mr. Yusuf's way of trading can cause big losses. In the end, they asked Apoy for help in dealing with a new basic food trader named Mr. Yusuf at Genjing Market, Apart from telling about Thugs Repent and the Genjing Market problem, The fourth season episodes are also peppered with love story between Faank and Fatin, which is a continuation of their love story in the previous season.

=== Season 5 ===
Apoy, Faank, Tomy, and Ovie, set out together to spreading da'wah. However, when Tomy was about to return for Genjing Market, he saw someone he thought was being robbed. She is Lela, a resident of Ujung Village. When Lela was confronted by a group of thugs, one of whom is Digo. Digo forced Lela to hand over her motorbike whose credit had not yet been paid off, while Tomy who saw the incident immediately helped Lela.

=== Season 6 ===
It started with the arrest of a grandfather named Munadi because he was accused of stealing, However it turned out that he had been framed. Next, Faank and his friends immediately helped in solving the problem. After that, they went to Ranca Kalong Village to return its society to the right path, because their faith that was almost lost and were helped by people-people at the Annur Islamic Boarding School.

=== Season 7 ===
Apoy is heading to Panyingkiran Village to help solve the problems faced by Saskia. However it turns out that Apoy and his friends have to stay longer to create an effective strategy, to overcome the various problems in Panyingkiran Village most of whom are dissatisfied with their current fate.

=== FTV (Amanah Wali: Kakus Kasus) ===
Nurdin returns to his hometown accompanied by Ovie. Nurdin intends to improve the image himself of former togel enthusiast which now repented.

== Cast ==
=== Main ===
- Wali Band
  - Faank as Himself
  - Apoy as Himself
  - Tomy as Himself
  - Ovie as Himself

=== Season 2 ===
- Yati Surachman as Yati
- Diar Hendryan as Mama Tomy
- Tasman Taher as Papa Tomy
- Renny Novita as Mama April
- Egi Fedly as Wali Sinar
- Zacky Zimah as Faruq
- Bombom as Gabuk
- Mono Cocok as Irman
- Neneng Wulandari as Neneng
- Valeria Stahl Kaliey as Fatin
- Tania Inggita Hardjosubroto as Lulu
- Soraya Rasyid as April
- Nahza Soebijakto as Wiyanti
- Wawan Wanisar as Kyai Imron
- Denaya Bintang Azmi as Ummi Aida
- Ali Zainal as Ustadz Zainal
- Cinta Brian as Rimba
- Panji Saputra as Dr. Dimas
- Akbar Kurniawan as Ricky
- Cupink Topan as Cupink
- Ricky Malau as Bang Naga
- Simon Diaz Mahendra as Simon
- Andrie Wacky as Acil
- Rowie Tiong Sien as Rowie
- Kang Uci as Mang Kadar
- Masayu Clara as Sofia
- Heriyanto as Jimmy
- Ade Jigo as Jigo
- Ray Shareza as Ustad Beling
- Dorman Borisman as Ustad Fadlan
- Ochy Thenu as Kampleng
- Indra Brewok as Katro
- Yurike Prastika as Linda

=== Season 3 ===
- Rano Karno as Ustadz Dullah
- Mandra as Aden
- Shanty Denny as Santi
- Dewi Octaviany as Amel
- Isel Fricella as Nining
- Mat Rozi as Samin
- Maya Yuniar as Miss Cici/Noura
- Ibnu Jamil as Lambemu
- Zacky Zimah as Faruq
- Bombom as Gabuk
- Mono Cocok as Irman
- Ochy Thenu as Kampleng
- Indra Brewok as Katro
- Donny Damara as Yusuf
- Sintya Marisca as Habibah
- Chand Kelvin as Bima
- Rizky Inggar as Wiwiek Soendari
- Della Puspita as Ibu Ani
- Tarzan as Pak Duryo
- Tonah as Mak Tonah
- Neneng Wulandari as Neneng
- Mayang Yudittia as Halimah
- Dharty Manullang as Rosmaya
- Nova Soraya as Ayang
- Ray Shareza as Ustadz Beling
- Joes Terpase as Haji Boim
- Nahza Soebijakto as Wiyanti
- Valeria Stahl Kaliey as Fatin
- Safinah as Nuansa
- Tiara Andini as Tiara
- Teddy Oktora as Bondan
- Roby Tremonti as Rohmat
- Aditya Rino as Dicky
- Ali Mensan as Kohreng
- Dedi Ilyas as Gondrong
- Eksanti as Imas
- Jui Purwoto as Iyus
- Anyun Cadel as Oteng
- Endah Pitasari as Ceu Lis
- Aiman Ricky as Heri
- Salim Bungsu as Salim
- Maryati Tohir as Mak Romlah
- Herry Ujang as Ismet
- Aldo Aminudin as Mang Darma
- Reinold Lawalata as Sukirman
- Ady Jabrix as Plongo
- Hami Diah as Meity
- Yulianto Hermawan as Jenggot
- Bang Badra as Botsky
- Buyung Malelo as Ustad Al Untung
- Anna Zivana as Tuti
- Valendza Wijaya as Sari
- Weni Panca as Nina
- Sanjid Azero as Roby
- Simon Diaz Mahendra as Simon
- Andrie Wacky as Acil
- Rowie Tiong Sien as Rowie
- Rendy Tezter as Ronald
- Rian Reza as Guntur
- Ardhi Purna as Alam
- Syarifadiya as Mitha
- Beby Trianitza as Beby

=== Season 4 ===
- Rano Karno as Ustadz Dullah
- Mandra as Aden
- Shanty Denny as Santi
- Dewi Octaviany as Amel
- Isel Fricella as Nining
- Mat Rozi as Samin
- Maya Yuniar as Miss Cici/Noura
- Ibnu Jamil as Lambemu
- Zacky Zimah as Faruq
- Bombom as Gabuk
- Mono Cocok as Irman
- Ochy Thenu as Kampleng
- Indra Brewok as Katro
- Donny Damara as Yusuf
- Sintya Marisca as Habibah
- Chand Kelvin as Bima
- Rizky Inggar as Wiwiek Soendari
- Della Puspita as Ibu Ani
- Tarzan as Pak Duryo
- Tonah as Mak Tonah
- Neneng Wulandari as Neneng
- Mayang Yudittia as Halimah
- Dharty Manullang as Rosmaya
- Nova Soraya as Ayang
- Ray Shareza as Ustadz Beling
- Joes Terpase as Haji Boim
- Nahza Soebijakto as Wiyanti
- Valeria Stahl Kaliey as Fatin
- Safinah as Nuansa
- Tiara Andini as Tiara
- Teddy Oktora as Bondan
- Roby Tremonti as Rohmat
- Aditya Rino as Dicky
- Ali Mensan as Kohreng
- Dedi Ilyas as Gondrong
- Eksanti as Imas
- Jui Purwoto as Iyus
- Anyun Cadel as Oteng
- Endah Pitasari as Ceu Lis
- Aiman Ricky as Heri
- Salim Bungsu as Salim
- Maryati Tohir as Mak Romlah
- Herry Ujang as Ismet
- Aldo Aminudin as Mang Darma
- Reinold Lawalata as Sukirman
- Ady Jabrix as Plongo
- Hami Diah as Meity
- Yulianto Hermawan as Jenggot
- Bang Badra as Botsky
- Buyung Malelo as Ustad Al Untung
- Anna Zivana as Tuti
- Valendza Wijaya as Sari
- Weni Panca as Nina
- Sanjid Azero as Roby
- Simon Diaz Mahendra as Simon
- Andrie Wacky as Acil
- Rowie Tiong Sien as Rowie
- Rendy Tezter as Ronald
- Rian Reza as Guntur
- Ardhi Purna as Alam
- Syarifadiya as Mitha
- Beby Trianitza as Beby

=== Season 5 ===
- Rano Karno as Ustadz Dullah
- Alfie Alfandy as Digo
- Teddy Syach as Mirza
- Salshabilla Adriani as Lela
- Elizabeth Christine as Ibu Lela
- Zacky Zimah as Faruq
- Bombom as Gabuk
- Mono Cocok as Irman
- Nahza Soebijakto as Wiyanti
- Valeria Stahl Kaliey as Fatin
- Tarzan as Pak Duryo
- Tonah as Mak Tonah
- Rizky Inggar as Wiwiek Soendari
- Aldo Aminudin as Mang Darma
- Joes Terpase as Haji Boim
- Ochy Thenu as Kampleng
- Indra Brewok as Katro
- Della Puspita as Ibu Ani
- Sintya Marisca as Habibah
- Roby Tremonti as Rohmat
- Teddy Oktora as Bondan
- Buyung Malelo as Ustad Al Untung
- Maryati Tohir as Mak Romlah
- Herry Ujang as Ismet
- Niniek Arum as Royani
- Malida Dinda] as Nora
- Evelina Witanama as Siera
- Ence Bagus as Atma
- Erick Estrada as Ozi
- Mariana Putri as Mila
- Ucha Limau as Arifin
- Yachyal Zas as Kong Mingan
- Supriyadi as Mang Manta
- Ahmad Zulhoir Mardia as Ace
- Jovana as Indi
- Marsha Risdasari as Hanna
- Fabyan Lesmana as Langlang
- Wina Zulfiana as Ibu Iin
- Fuad Idris as Hamdan
- Diva Almira as Rere
- Eka Wahyu ss Acung
- Muhammad Haniefan as Dombe
- Simon Diaz Mahendra as Simon
- Andrie Wacky as Acil
- Rowie Tiong Sien as Rowie
- Ali Mensan as Kohreng
- Rian Reza as Guntur
- Rendy Tezter as Ronald
- Ardhi Purna as Alam
- Daisy S. Brata as Nely
- Surya Manly as Ekky
- Weni Panca as Nina
- Syarifadiya as Mitha
- Beby Trianitza as Beby
- Aditya Rino as Dicky
- Ady Jabrix as Plongo
- Valendza Wijaya as Sari
- Yulianto Hermawan as Jenggot
- Bang Badra as Botsky
- Dedi Ilyas as Gondrong
- Reinold Lawalata as Sukirman
- Adit Sayuti as Sukri
- Heather Variava as Heather
- La Nyalla Mattalitti as La

=== Season 6 ===
- Zacky Zimah as Faruq
- Rizky Inggar as Wiwiek Soendari
- Aldo Aminudin as Mang Darma
- Herry Ujang as Ismet
- Della Puspita as Ibu Ani
- Tonah as Mak Tonah
- Buyung Malelo as Ustadz Al Untung
- Diva Almira as Rere
- Ratu Jelita as Rossa
- Mono Cocok as Irman
- Bombom aa Gabuk
- Supriyadi as Mang Manta
- Joes Terpase as Haji Boim
- Yachyal Zas as Kong Mingan
- Salim Bungsu as Mang Endang
- Betari Ayu as Shifa
- Davina Karamoy as Maya
- Wingky Harun as Kong Munadi
- Tenno Ali as Kong Encup
- Man Koko as Kong Wawan
- Bagong Pangat as Kong Kusna
- Sandy Pradana as Solihin
- Ki Daus as Said
- Diego Robbanna as Ame
- Rano Karno as Ustadz Dullah
- Sintya Marisca as Habibah
- Nahza Soebijakto as Wiyanti
- Valeria Stahl Kaliey as Fatin
- Maryati Tohir as Mak Romlah
- Endah Pitasari as Ceu Lis
- Tarzan as Pak Duryo
- Wan Afox as Jidun
- Yudhi Hafiz as Agus
- Boah Sartika as Yuni
- Shezy Idris as Ibu Endang
- Aga Dirgantara as Sonny
- Rizky Tama as Yono
- Varissa Camelia as Mak Eca
- Denaya Bintang Azmi as Ummi Aida
- Marsha Risdasari as Hanna
- Fachri Muhammad as Alex
- Indra Brewok as Katro
- Ochy Thenu as Kampleng
- Weni Panca as Nina
- Novilia Annisa as Mae
- Teddy Oktora as Bondan
- Roby Tremonti as Rohmat
- Alfie Alfandy as Digo
- Surya Manly as Ekky
- Reinold Lawalata as Sukirman
- Yulianto Hermawan as Jenggot
- Ali Mensan as Kohreng
- Rian Reza as Guntur
- Rendy Tezter as Ronald
- Ardhi Purna as Alam
- Eka Wahyu as Acung
- Muhammad Haniefan as Dombe
- Iwan Bowo Suwondo as Ikal
- Budi Bima as Boni
- Tono J AFC as Madut
- Nkiss Segunda as Yuli
- Raifana Shazwani as Mondy
- Nadiyah Hasanah Arrasyid as Inoy
- M. Dicky Wiratama Negara as Nala
- Marshall Abi Rafdi Zharfan as Pony
- Ismi Melinda as Angel
- Monica Selvia as Laura
- Risti Pouran as Yeyen
- Adinda Vega as Keke
- Akmal Fadhillah as Michael
- Cansirano as Kibot
- Citra Pratimi as Karin
- Agus Mahesa as Jodi
- Regina Alyanas Nuraini
- Piet Pagau as Mr. Lee/Sarmili
- Jihan Alyssa as Susi
- Franki Darmawan as Coki
- Dian Dipa Chandrabas Bos Tuktuk
- Simon Diaz Mahendra as Simon
- Andrie Wacky as Acil
- Rowie Tiong Sien as Rowie
- Boomber Arie as Bagong
- S. Opy Antiflag as Candil

=== Season 7 ===
- Epy Kusnandar as Pak Eep
- Valeria Stahl Kaliey as Fatin
- Denaya Bintang Azmi as Ummi Aida
- Sintya Marisca as Habibah
- Rizky Inggarnas Wiwiek Soendari
- Anjani Dina as Saskia
- Husnie Ramdan as Bang Husni
- Lionil Hendrik as Budi Seblak
- Herdin Hidayat as Pak Anang
- Dicky Andryanto as Pak Mukhtar
- Ning Ayu Suwenda as Tania
- Cita Frida Maharani as Sarah
- Diva Almira as Rere
- Asep Suhendar as Pak Burhan
- Andi Bersama as Pak Sulhan
- Diaz Ardiawan as Andro
- Azzah Gumanti as Icis
- Jihan Lifa as Iroh
- Fariz Iskandar as Romli
- Asep Garuk as Yamin

=== Season 8 ===
- Bhisma Mulia as Sultan
- Faisal Wash as Herman
- Bebby Hatami as Rani
- Galuh Indrajita as Leha
- Syarla Marz as Mira
- Armando Jordy as Sunar
- Buyung Malelo as Untung
- Herry Ujang as Ismet
- Andi Bersama as Ma'ruf
- Fachri Muhammad as James
- Jerry Libing as Jerry
- Adhi Pawitra as Teddy
- Imelda Laurentsia as Fitri
- Avan Sanjaya as Ikim
- Adam Kopplak as Tukang Bubur Ayam
- Dedi Ilyas as Gondrong
- Andrie Wacky as Acil
- Ochy Thenu as Kampleng
