= Ziva Magnolya =

Indonesian singer (born 2001)

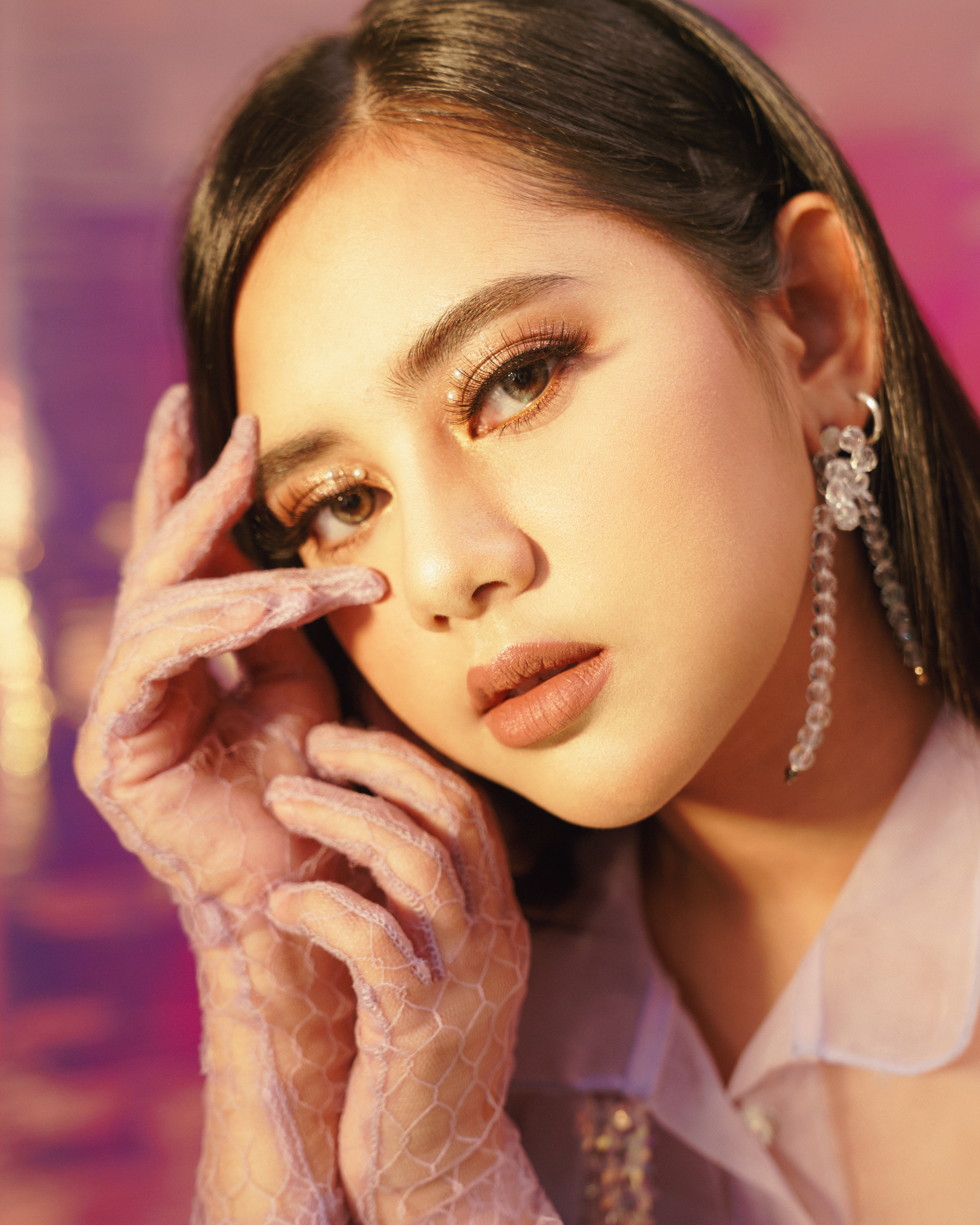
- Magnolya in 2022

Background information
- Born: Ziva Magnolya Muskitta; 14 March 2001 (age 25); Jakarta, Indonesia
- Genres: Pop; R&B
- Occupations: Singer; actress
- Years active: 2019–present
- Label: Universal Music Indonesia

Ziva Magnolya Muskitta (born 14 March 2001) is an Indonesian singer. She is best known for the third place finalist on the tenth season of Indonesian Idol, broadcast by the national television channels RCTI in 2019–2020.

== Life and career ==
Ziva Magnolya was born with the name Ziva Magnolya Muskitta on 14 March 2001 in Jakarta, Indonesia. She is the second child of two siblings, from the couple Stevanus Muskitta and Cindy Asie Busel.

In 2019, Magnolya perform a duet with Jeremy Passion at 2019 Ramadhan Jazz Festival.

Furthermore, in 2019, at the age of 18, Magnolya participated in the Indonesian Idol. And on 17 February 2020, she was eliminated and finished third.

A remix of Stacey Ryan single "Fall in Love Alone" featuring Magnolya was released in November 2022.

== Performances on Indonesian Idol X ==
Theme	Song	Original Singer	result
Audition	"Kesempurnaan Cinta"	Rizky Febian	Special Invitation by Rizky Febian
Audition	"Dear No One"	Tori Kelly	Golden Ticket
Elimination 1 : Acapella	"Love on Top"	Beyonce	Safe
Elimination 2 : Grup : Best of the Best	"Best Part"	Daniel Caesar & H.E.R	Safe
Elimination 3 : Solo	"Versace on the Floor"	Bruno Mars	Safe
Showcase 1	"Unaware"	Allen Stone	Safe
Final Showcase 1	"7 Rings"	Ariana Grande	Safe
Spectra 1	"Berharap Tak Berpisah"	Reza Artamevia	Safe
Spectra 2	"Tanya Hati"	Pasto	Safe
Spectra 3	"Runaway Baby"	Bruno Mars	Safe
Spectra 4	"Human"	Christina Perri	Safe
Spectra 5	"Tegar"	Rossa	Safe
Spectra 6	"Peri Cintaku"	Marcell	Safe
Spectra 7	"Penantian Berharga"	Rizky Febian	Safe
Spectra 8	"Lagi Syantik"	Siti Badriah	Safe
Spectra 9	"Don't You Worry 'Bout A Thing"	Stevie Wonder	Bottom 3
Spectra 10	"Yummy"	Justin Bieber	Safe
Spectra 11	"In My Place"	Coldplay	Bottom 2
Spectra 11	"Dear Diary"	Ratu	Bottom 2
Spectra 12	"Asal Kau Bahagia"	Armada	Bottom 2
Spectra 12	"Listen"	Beyonce	Bottom 2
Road to Grand Final	"Aku, Dirimu, Dirinya"	Kahitna	Third Place
Road to Grand Final	"Matahariku"	Agnez Mo	Third Place

== Discography ==
=== Single ===
Song	Year	Chart	Album
Song	Year	IDN	Album
"Tak Sanggup Melupa (Terlanjur Mencinta)"	2020	–	Non-album single
"Mata-Mata Harimu"	2020	–	Non-album single
"Sampai Kapan"	2020	–	Non-album single
"Terlukis Indah" (feat Rizky Febian)	2021	–	Non-album single
"Peri Cintaku"	2022	–	Non-album single
