= Mount Maru (Kamishihoro-Shintoku) =

Lava dome in the Ishikari mountains on the island of Hokkaido, Japan

- 丸山
- Location within Japan Location within Hokkaido

Highest point
- Elevation: 1,692.1 m (5,552 ft)
- Prominence: 421 m (1,381 ft)
- Parent peak: Mount Nipesotsu
- Listing: List of mountains and hills of Japan by height List of volcanoes by elevation
- Coordinates: 43°25′3″N 143°1′51″E

Naming
- English translation: round mountain
- Language of name: Japanese

Geography
- Location: Hokkaido, Japan
- Parent range: Nipesotsu-Maruyama Volcanic Group
- Topo map(s): Geospatial Information Authority 25000:1 ニペソツ山; 25000:1 ウペペサンケ山; 50000:1 糠平

Geology
- Rock age: Quaternary
- Mountain type: lava dome
- Volcanic arc: Kurile arc
- Last eruption: 1898

Mount Maru (丸山, Maru-yama) is a lava dome located in the Nipesotsu-Maruyama Volcanic Group of the Ishikari Mountains, Hokkaidō, Japan. Mount Maru is also known as Higashi-Tokachi-Maruyama (東十勝丸山) or Higashi-Taisetsu-Maruyama (東大雪丸山) to distinguish it from other mountains with the same name. Only in 1989 did scientists discover that Mount Maru is a quaternary volcano. The mountain sits on the border between the towns of Kamishihoro and Shintoku.

== Geology ==
The western flank of the mountain shows accretionary complex from the late Eocene to the early Miocene. The eastern flank shows non-alkaline mafic volcanic rock from the early to middle Miocene. The mountain is topped with non-alkaline mafic rock from the middle Pleistocene.

== Eruptive history ==
Other than fumaroles, the last eruption of Mount Maru, according to historical records, was from approximately December 3, 1898 to December 6. Before that the last eruption was approximately 1700 BC.

== See also ==
- List of volcanoes in Japan
- List of mountains in Japan
