= Hanako Tokachi =

Japanese actress (1946 - 2016)

- 十勝 花子
- Born: Keiko Sato; 25 April 1946; Kamishihoro, Katō District, Hokkaido
- Died: 21 August 2016 (aged 70); Tokyo
- Other names: Keiko Kato (real name)
- Occupations: Actress; tarento
- Years active: 1966–2016
- Agent: Office Hanako
- Style: Film; television drama
- Television: Nantatte 18 sai!; Daichi no Ko

Hanako Tokachi (十勝 花子, Tokachi Hanako; 25 April 1946 – 21 August 2016) was a Japanese actress and tarento born in Kamishihoro, Katō District, Hokkaido. Her real name was Keiko Kato (加藤 恵子, Katō Keiko). Her maiden name was Sato (佐藤, Satō). She was nicknamed Tokachin (トカチン). She has one daughter named Reiko.

== Filmography ==
=== Films ===
Year	Title	Role
	Ore to aitsu no Monogatari	
	Nipponrettō Shindo 0	
1970	Alleycat Rock: Female Boss	Hanako
	The Bullet Train	
	Eden no Umi	
	Jingi to Kōsō	
1984	Space Sheriff Shaider: Pursuit! The Strange Kidnappers!	

=== Stage ===
Title
Enoken Rappa Monogatari
Kumo no Ue Dan Gorō ichiza
Dōkeshi no Uta
Daidokoro Taihei-ki

=== Direct-to-video ===
Title
Dotou no Sasaguchi-gumi

=== TV series ===
==== Dramas ====
Year	Title	Role	Network	Notes
1971	Playgirl		TV Tokyo	Episode 126
1971	Nantatte 18 sai!	Hanae Shimada	TBS	
1972	Mama wa Rival		TBS	
1973	Eyeful Dai Sakusen		TBS	Episode 1
1978	Ōoka Echizen	Okozu	TBS	Episode 24
1979	Ōedo Sōsamō		TV Tokyo	Episodes 411 and 429
1979	Netchū Jidai: Keiji-hen	Yasuko Kurai	NTV	Episode 9
	Edo no Kiba		TV Asahi	
	G-Men '75		TBS	Episodes 240 and 266
1980	Tabigarasu Jiken Jō	Owaka	KTV	From Episode 14
1980	Netchū Jidai: Kyōshi-hen	Masako	NTV	2nd Series Episode 21
1980	Uwasa no Keiji Tommy to Matsu	Snack Mama	TBS	Episode 45
1980	Mito Kōmon Part 11	Hiyokomaru	TBS	Episode 16
1982	Bungo To-mono-chō		TV Asahi	Episode 14
1982	Ijiwaru bāsan	Hanako Busujima	Fuji TV	Episode 21
1982	G-Men '82		TBS	Episode 6
1983	Tsuma no Teinen		TBS	
1984	Space Sheriff Shaider		TV Asahi	Episode 10
1986	Seicho Matsumoto Suspense Inka no Kazari / Otedama		KTV	
1987	Chocchan		NHK	
	Chūgakusei Nikki		NHK	
	Daichi no Ko	Sakiko Osawa	NHK	
	Fūfu		NHK	
1990	Abarenbō Shōgun III	Otomi	TV Asahi	Episode 114
	Doyō Wide Gekijō		TV Asahi	

==== Informal programmes ====
Title	Network
Hiroshi Ogawa Show	Fuji TV
Afternoon Show	TV Asahi
2-Ji no Wide Show	NTV
Look Look konnichiwa	NTV
Sasowarete Futaritabi	TV Asahi
Ningen Tanken motto Shiritai	TV Asahi
Saraba Natsu no Hikari yo	TBS
Doyō Special	TV Tokyo

==== Variety ====
Title	Network	Notes
Dokusen! Onna no 60-bu	TV Asahi	
Shingo no Omachido osama	TBS	
Tunnels no minasan no okagedesu	Fuji TV	
Ichi-mai no Shashin	Fuji TV	
Quiz Omoshiro Seminar	NHK-G	
Yume de Aetara	Fuji TV	Appeared in "Hagure Kyōshi Nekketsu-ha: Bōsai Kunren no Expert"
Higashino-Ariyoshi no	TBS	

==== Advertisements ====
Title
Broadcast Programming Center of Japan Campaign Spot "Tashikamemashou, hakkiri to!!"
Marumiya Kamameshi no Moto
Kaigen Pharma
Discount Super Rogers

=== Radio ===
Title
Kayōkyokuda yo okkasan
Doyō no Sora ni
Nighter Jockey

=== Video games ===
Title	Role	Notes
Machi	Kayoko Tsugawa	"Nanayōkai"

== Discography ==
Title
"Anogoro-kono Koro-kore Kara"
"Jinsei Ippon"
"Sōran Musume"
"Kinpai no Uta"
"Meotomoyō"
"Otōchan"
"Tsugaru Junjō-bushi"
