= Tokachi-Mitsumata Caldera =

Caldera on the island of Hokkaido, Japan

Coordinates: 43.516667°N 143.15°E

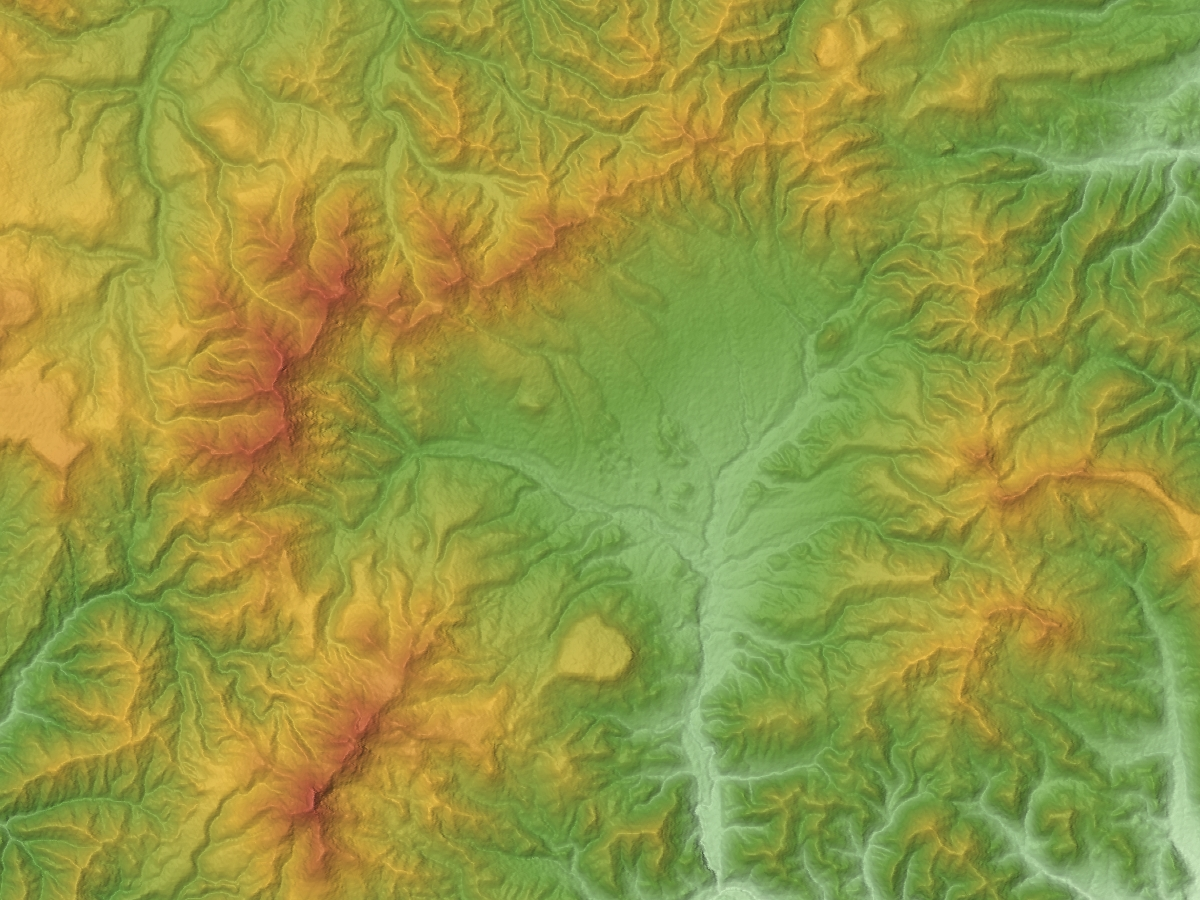
Tokachi-Mitsumata Caldera

Tokachi-Mitsumata Caldera is an 8-km wide volcanic caldera in the Ishikari Mountains of Daisetsuzan National Park in Hokkaidō, Japan.

The caldera is bounded to the north by the Ishikari Mountains and to the southwest by the Nipesotsu-Maruyama Volcanic Group.

== See also ==
- List of volcanoes in Japan
