= Mount Upepesanke =

Lava dome on the island of Hokkaido, Japan

- ウペペサンケ山
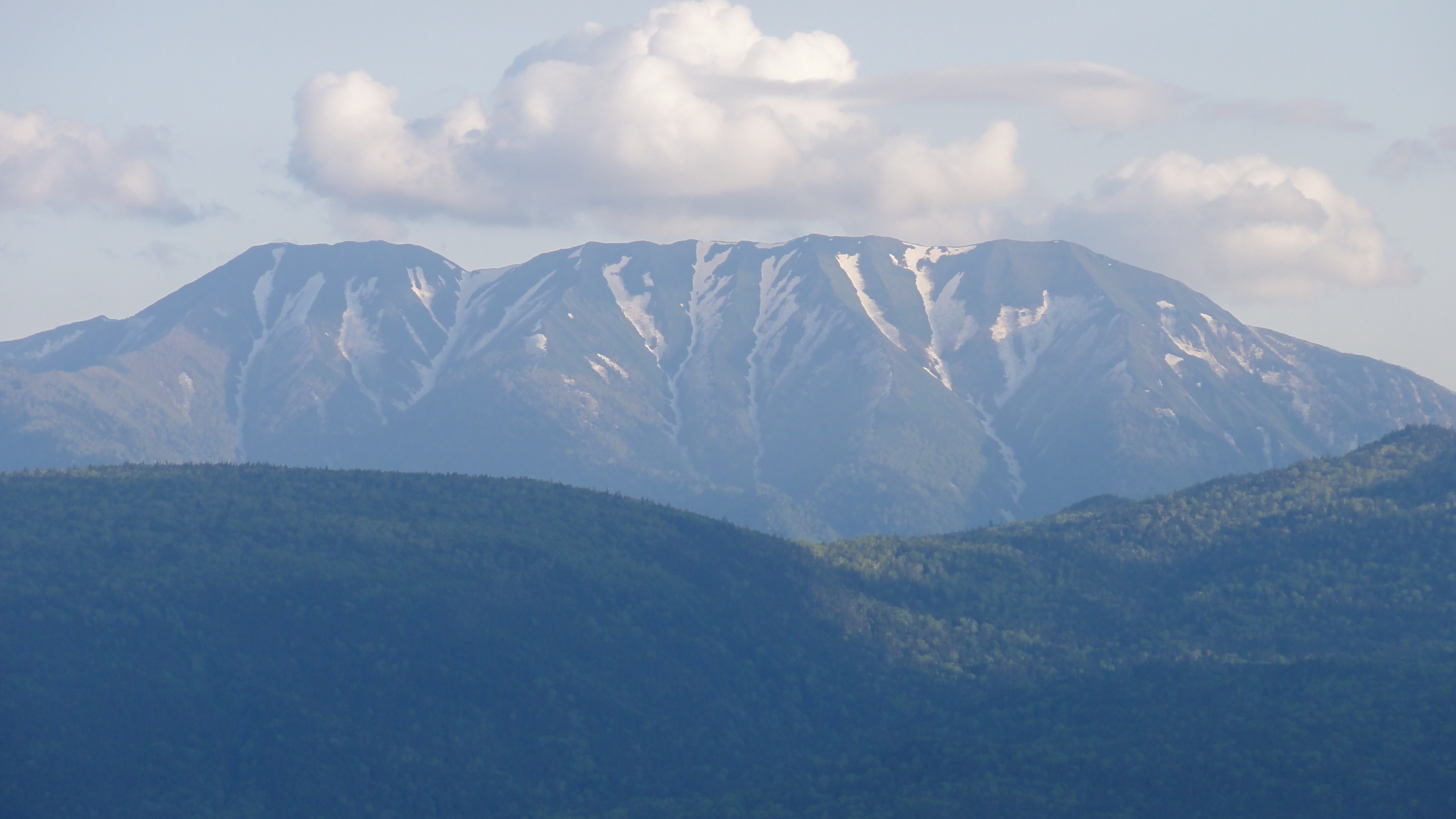

Highest point
- Elevation: 1,848 m (6,063 ft)
- Prominence: 648 m (2,126 ft)
- Parent peak: Mount Nipesotsu
- Listing: List of mountains and hills of Japan by height
- Coordinates: 43°23′22″N 143°04′55″E

Geography
- Location within Japan Location within Hokkaido
- Location: Hokkaido, Japan
- Parent range: Nipesotsu-Maruyama Volcanic Group
- Topo map(s): Geographical Survey Institute 25000:1 ウペペサンケ山; 50000:1 糠平

Geology
- Mountain type: lava dome
- Volcanic arc: Kurile arc

Mount Upepesanke (ウペペサンケ山, Upepesanke-yama) is a lava dome located in the Nipesotsu-Maruyama Volcanic Group of the Ishikari Mountains, Hokkaido, Japan.
