= Central Ishikari Mountains =

Mountain group in the country of Japan

Ishikari Mountains
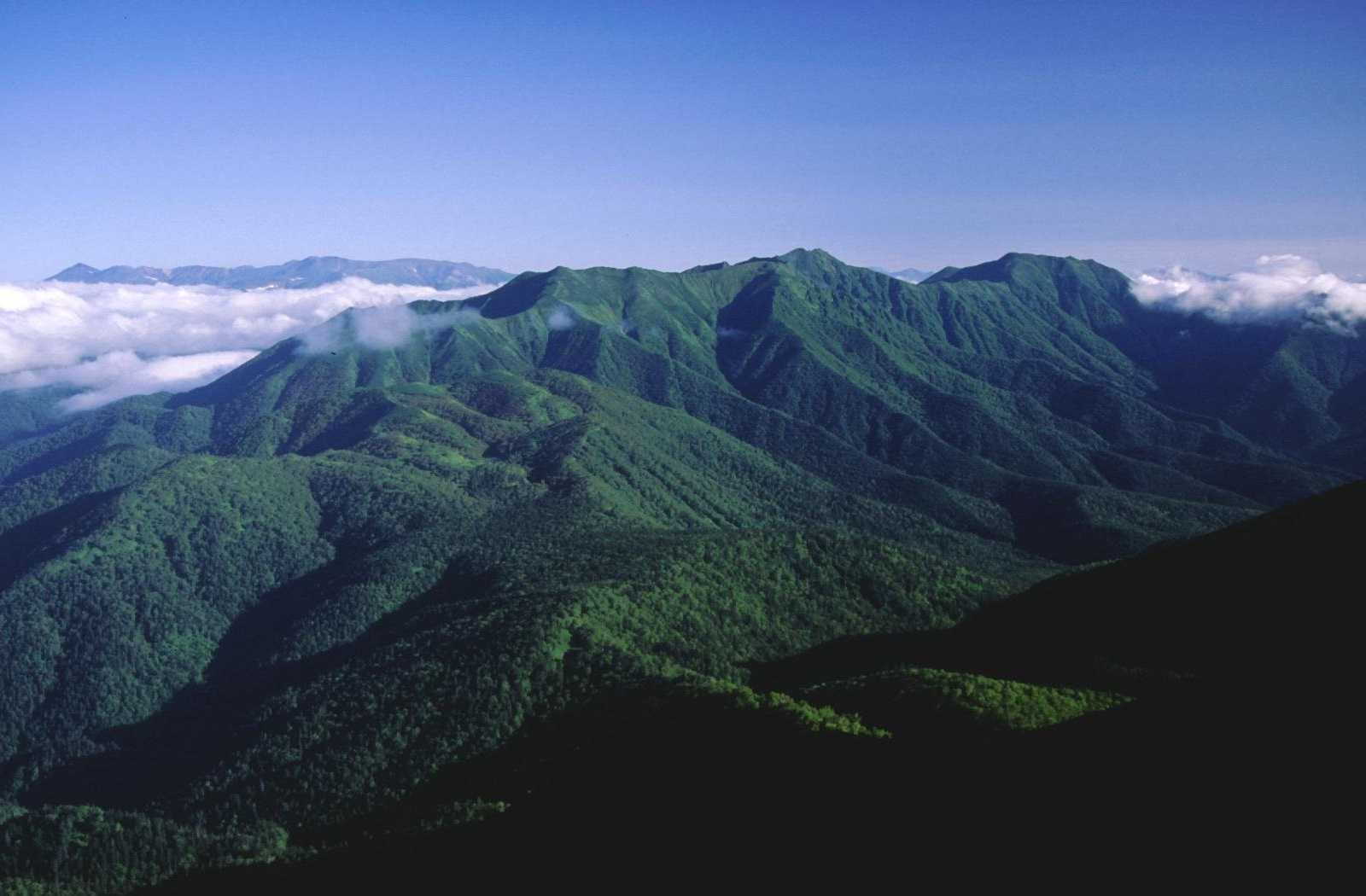
- From Nipesotsu-Maruyama Volcanic Group

Highest point
- Peak: Mount Ishikari
- Elevation: 1,967 m (6,453 ft)
- Coordinates: 43°32′48″N 143°1′20″E

Naming
- Native name: 石狩山地 (Ishikari Sanchi) or; ishokarappet

Geography
- Location within Japan
- Country: Japan
- State: Hokkaidō
- Parent range: Ishikari Mountains
- Borders on: Nipesotsu-Maruyama Volcanic Group
- Biome: Alpine climate

Geology
- Orogeny: Island arc
- Rock age: Quaternary

The Central Ishikari Mountains (石狩中央山地, Ishikari Chūō Sanchi), or more commonly referred to simply as the Ishikari Mountains (石狩山地, Ishikari Sanchi), are a group of mountains in central Hokkaidō, Japan.

== List of peaks ==
- Mount Ishikari
- Mount Otofuke
- Mount Mikuni
- Mount Yuniishikari
- Mount Numanohara

== Geography ==
These mountains border Tokachi-Mitsumata Caldera to the south and Nipesotsu-Maruyama Volcanic Group to the southwest.
