= 1 Litre of Tears =

1 Litre of Tears may refer to:

- 1 Litre no Namida, a 1986 book by Aya Kitō
- 1 Litre no Namida (TV series), a 2005 Japanese television drama based on the book
- A Litre of Tears (film), 2004, based on the book
