= Makomanai Park =

City park in Hokkaido, Japan

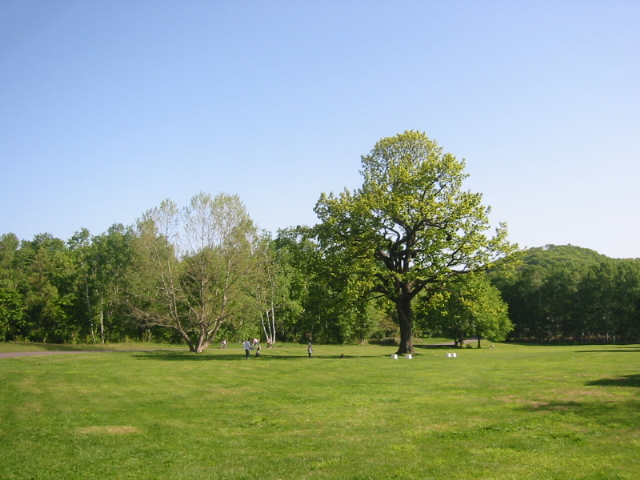

- Location within Japan Location within Hokkaido Location within Sapporo
- Interactive map of Makomanai Park
- Location: Minami-ku, Sapporo, Hokkaido, Japan
- Coordinates: 43.001101°N 141.346385°E
- Area: 85 hectares (210 acres)
- Created: 1975

Makomanai Park (真駒内公園) is a city park in Minami-ku, Sapporo, Hokkaido, Japan. It is home to attractions such as Makomanai Open Stadium, Makomanai Ice Arena and the Sapporo Salmon Museum. It also contains a small gymnasium, restaurant and a shop.

The area where the park is now located was the main site of the Sapporo 1972 Winter Olympic Games.

== History ==
The current Makomanai Park was originally the site of a former dairy factory and farm. For the 1972 Winter Olympics it was designated as the main area for the Games, where most facilities, including the main stadium, were to be built. After the Olympics, construction of the Park began and in 1975 it was officially opened to the public.

== Overview ==
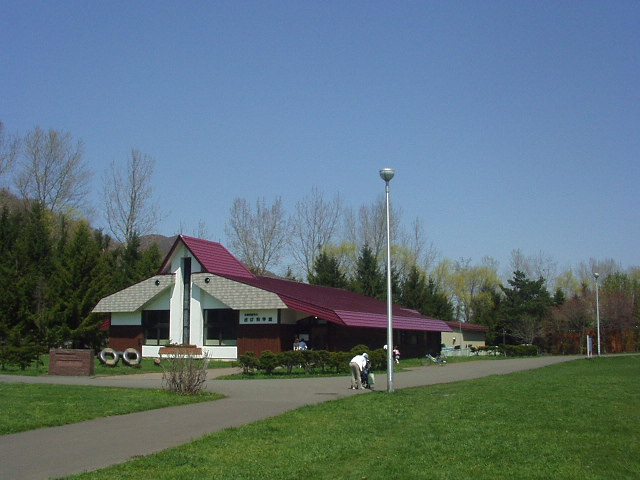
Salmon Museum inside the park

Located in the southern part of the city, along the Toyohira riverside, in the confluence with the Makomanai River, the park contains coniferous and broad-leaved trees.

The park includes over 10 km of walking paths. It is used from spring to autumn as a walk or jogging course and in winter as a cross-country skiing path.

The Makomanai Open Stadium, sited at the center of the park, opened on 1971. The stadium hosted the Olympics Opening ceremony and the speed skating events. It is used today for speed skating competitions in the winter, and as a tennis court in the summer.

The park also contains the Makomanai Ice Arena, which opened also in 1972. The arena was inside the new venues plan and hosted during the Winter Olympics figure skating competitions, some ice hockey games and the closing ceremonies. Today, it is utilized as a concert venue and ice skating facility.

The Sapporo Salmon Museum, opened in 1984. It is located at the northwestern end of the park, and explains the fish, including its life history and its importance for the region. In the outdoor observation channel, visitors can watch salmon spawning in autumn, and newly spawned salmon alevins in the spring. The indoor aquarium exhibits rainbow trout, landlocked salmon and Sakhalin taimen species.

== Access ==
- Namboku Line: 20 minutes walking distance from Makomanai Station.
