= Mount Yuniishikari =

Mountain in Hokkaidō, Japan

- ユニ石狩岳
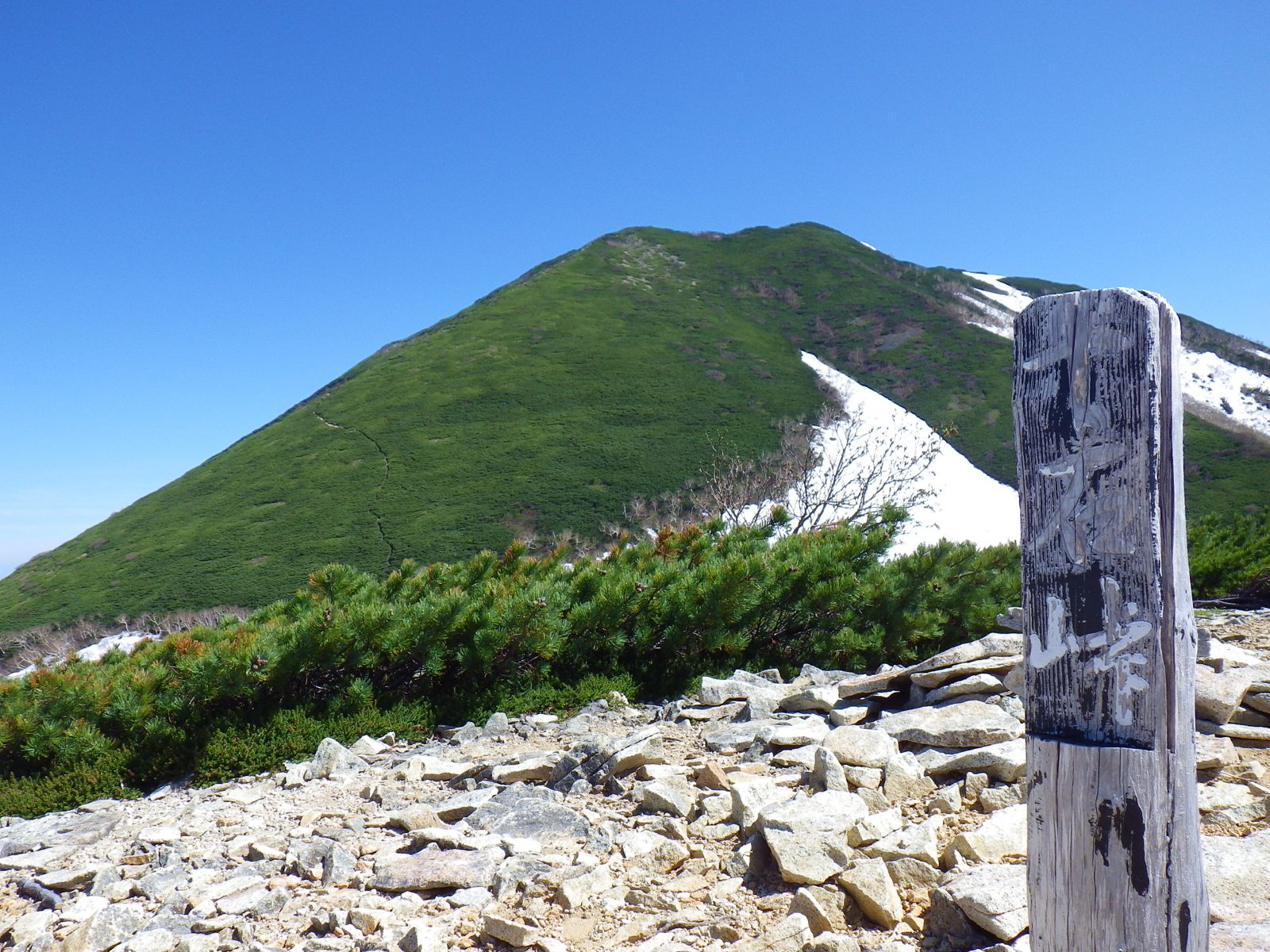
- Mount Yuniishikari seen from the south

Highest point
- Elevation: 1,756 m (5,761 ft)
- Prominence: 226 m (741 ft)
- Parent peak: Mount Otofuke
- Listing: List of mountains and hills of Japan by height
- Coordinates: 43°33′52″N 143°4′13″E

Geography
- Location within Japan Location within Hokkaido
- Location: Hokkaidō, Japan
- Parent range: Central Ishikari Mountains
- Topo map(s): Geographical Survey Institute 25000:1 石狩岳; 50000:1 石狩岳

Geology
- Rock age: Early-Middle Eocene
- Mountain type: Pluton
- Volcanic arc: Kurile Arc

Mount Yuniishikari (ユニ石狩岳, Yuni-ishikari-dake) is part of the Ishikari Mountains, Hokkaidō, Japan.

== See also ==
- List of mountains and hills of Japan by height
