= Mikuni =

Mikuni may refer to:

== People ==
Given name

- Mikuni Shimokawa (下川 みくに; born 1980), Japanese pop singer
- Mikuni Takahashi Japanese idol and captain of the group Hinatazaka46

Surname

- Rentarō Mikuni (三國 連太郎; 1923 – 2013), Japanese actor
- SteviaEgbus Mikuni (三國 スティビアエブス; born 1998), Japanese professional footballer
- KennedyEgbus Mikuni (三國 ケネディエブス; born 2000), Japanese footballer

== Places ==
- Mount Mikuni (disambiguation)
- Mikuni (company), a Japanese corporation
- Mikuni, Fukui, a town located in Sakai District, Fukui, Japan
- Mikuni Kaidō, an ancient highway in Japan
- Mikuni World Stadium Kitakyushu, an association football and rugby union stadium

Station

- Mikuni Awara Line, a railway line operated by Echizen Railway in Fukui Prefecture
- Mikuni-Minato Station, is an Echizen Railway Mikuni Awara Line railway station
- Mikuni-Jinjya Station, is an Echizen Railway Mikuni Awara Line railway station
- Mikuni Station
