= Enkiri Village: Dead End Survival =

- Directed by: Kōichi Tsubaki
- Screenplay by: Kōichi Tsubaki
- Starring: Reina Fujie; Ren Yagami; Mayuka Okada; Saori Yamamoto; Mitsuo Hamada; Midori Isomura; Shigeru Saiki
- Release date: October 15, 2011
- Running time: 90 minutes
- Country: Japan
- Language: Japanese

Enkiri Village: Dead End Survival (縁切り村〜デッド・エンド・サバイバル〜) is a 2011 Japanese horror film written and directed by Kōichi Tsubaki and starring Reina Fujie and Ren Yagami.

== Cast ==
- Reina Fujie
- Ren Yagami
- Mayuka Okada
- Saori Yamamoto
- Mitsuo Hamada
- Midori Isomura
- Shigeru Saiki
