= Ishikari River =

Longest river in Hokkaido, Japan

Coordinates: 43°28′49″N 141°52′10″E

Ishikari River 石狩川
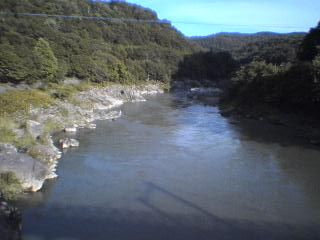
- The Ishikari River at Kamui Kotan near Asahikawa

- Location within Japan
- Etymology: "Winding (River)" in Ainu
- Native name: Ishikari-gawa (Japanese)

Location
- Country: Japan
- State: Hokkaido

Physical characteristics
- Source: Mount Ishikari
- Mouth: Sea of Japan
  - elevation: 0 m (0 ft)
- Length: 268 km (167 mi)
- Basin size: 14,330 km^{2} (5,530 sq mi)
- Discharge
  - average: 468 m^{3}/s (16,500 cu ft/s)

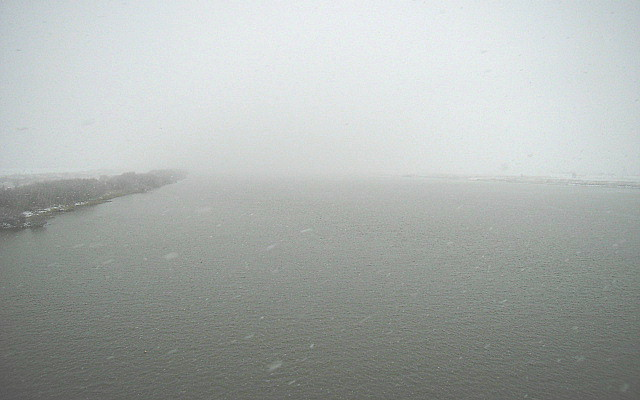
The Ishikari River at the north of Sapporo

The Ishikari River (石狩川, Ishikari-gawa), at 268 kilometres (167 mi) long, is the third longest in Japan and the longest in Hokkaido. The Class A river drains an area of 14,330 square kilometres (5,530 mi^{2}), making it the second largest in Japan, with a total discharge of around 14.8 cubic kilometres (3.6 mi^{3}) per year.

It originates from Mount Ishikari in the Daisetsuzan Volcanic Group and flows through Asahikawa and Sapporo. Major tributaries of the river include the Chūbetsu, Uryū, Sorachi and Toyohira rivers. Until 40,000 years ago, it flowed into the Pacific Ocean near Tomakomai. Lava from the volcanic Shikotsu mountains dammed the river and moved its mouth to the Ishikari Bay.

The name of the river is derived from the Ainu for "make(s) itself go round about something" (i-si-kari < kari meaning "(to be a) circle, round, loop; spin, turn, go around, go back and forth," si- "reflexive prefix, itself, oneself," and i- "it, something, an impersonal third person object marking prefix, middle voice inflection prefix), i.e. "winding (river)." As it suggests, the river once meandered in the Ishikari Plain and was as long as the Shinano River, the longest river in Japan. Extensive construction and cultivation projects over the centuries have shortened the Ishikari by approximately 100 kilometres, and have also led to the formation of numerous oxbow lakes (三日月湖, mikatsuki ko; lit. crescent moon lake) in the plain as a result of the river changing its course.

The landscape and human activities along the Ishikari River, especially the hard life of tenant farmers, are described in the novel The Absentee Landlord published in 1929 by the Japanese writer Takiji Kobayashi.
