= Mount Ishikari =

- 石狩岳
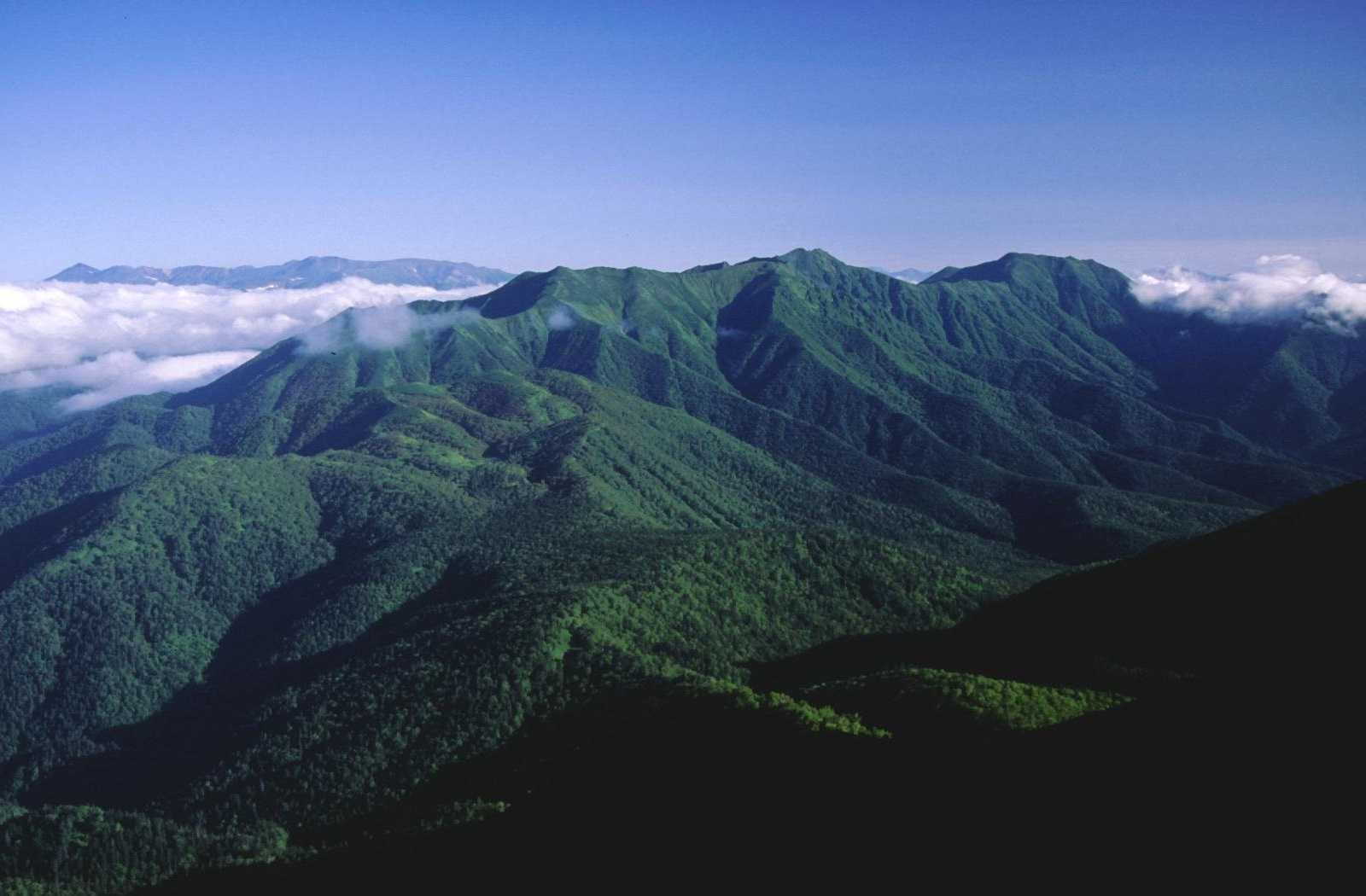
- seen from Nipesotsu-Maruyama Volcanic Group

Highest point
- Elevation: 1,967 m (6,453 ft)
- Listing: List of mountains and hills of Japan by height
- Coordinates: 43°32′48″N 143°1′20″E

Geography
- Location within Japan Location within Hokkaido
- Location: Hokkaidō, Japan
- Parent range: Central Ishikari Mountains
- Topo map(s): Geographical Survey Institute 25000:1 石狩岳; 50000:1 石狩岳

Geology
- Rock age: Early Cretaceous-Middle Eocene
- Volcanic arc: Kurile Arc

Mount Ishikari (石狩岳, Ishikari-dake) is part of the Ishikari Mountains, Hokkaidō, Japan. On its slopes are the head waters of the Ishikari River.

== See also ==
- Central Ishikari Mountains
- Daisetsuzan National Park
