= Ishikari Plain =

Coastal plain in Western Hokkaido, Japan

Coordinates: 43°N 141.6666°E

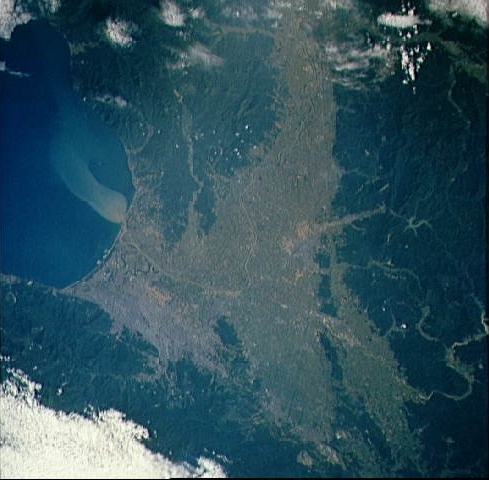
Ishikari Plain

Ishikari Plain (Japanese: 石狩平野, Hepburn: Ishikari-heiya) is a plain in western Hokkaido.

The area of the plain is approximately 3800km^{2}. The central city is Sapporo. Rice cultivation is very popular in the Ishikari Plain. Groundwater of Ishikari Plain is contaminated with arsenic due to leaching from geological formations.

Name of the Ishikari Plain comes from the Ainu word Ishikaribetsu, which is interpreted as “a river that winds and flows” or “a river that (God) made beautifully”. It refers to the Ishikari River.

== Popular Culture ==
A fictionalized version of Ishikari Plain is extensively featured in the 2025 action-adventure video game Ghost of Yōtei. In the game, it serves as the primary setting for hunting the Oni, a member of the Yōtei Six, the main antagonists of the game.
