= Aya Kitō =

Japanese diarist

- 木藤 亜也
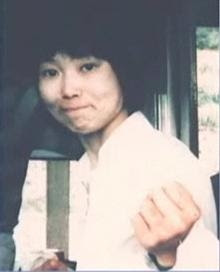
- Aya Kitō
- Born: 19 July 1962; Toyohashi, Aichi, Japan
- Died: 23 May 1988 (aged 25); Japan
- Cause of death: Spinocerebellar ataxia

Aya Kitō (木藤 亜也, Kitō Aya; 19 July 1962 – 23 May 1988) was a Japanese diarist. She wrote about her personal experiences living with spinocerebellar ataxia which was later published in the book 1 Litre no Namida. The book has been translated into many languages and millions of copies are said to have been read around the world, and has also been made into a 2004 film and a 2005 television drama series from Fuji TV in which Asae Ônishi (movie) and Erika Sawajiri (TV series) portrayed Kitō.

== Early life ==
Aya Kitō was born to Shioka, a nurse, and her husband Mizuno, an office worker. She was the oldest of five siblings, the other four being Ako, Hiroki, Kentarō and Rika.

At the age of 14, Kitō started writing a diary. From the age of 15, after her diagnosis, she used it to record her experiences, including her symptoms.

At the age of 15, in her third year of junior high school, she complained of frequent falls and other physical problems, and was examined at Koseikai Hospital. Later, doctors diagnosed her with spinocerebellar ataxia, an intractable disease that gradually deprives a person of freedom of limbs and speech and eventually causes the loss of all motor functions of the body. Her friends helped her with climbing the stairs or walking, but it became harder for them and especially Kitō, so she went to a school for disabled people. Until the age of 25, Kitō's health continually worsened, and she was eventually unable to complete daily tasks (ADLs). She eventually became confined to her bed, and was unable to walk or speak.

Kitō had the incurable disease for 10 years and experienced both emotional and physical pain, which was subsequently stressful to her family as well. Her family, however, continued to support her for the remainder of her life.

== Death and legacy ==
On 23 May 1988, at 0:55 a.m., Kitō passed away only two months before her 26th birthday due to the debilitating effects of progressive spinocerebellar ataxia and the ensuing uremia due to organ failure. Her body was donated for medical research. Her mother, Shioka, later published a book titled Hurdles of Life in which she wrote about her memories of her daughter.

Kitō's diary, entitled 1 Litre of Tears, which she kept until she lost the use of her hands during her battle with the disease, was first published in her native Japan on 25 February 1986 by a publisher in Nagoya, two years before her death at the age of 25. Shioka convinced her to publicize her diary in order to give hope to others since Aya had always wanted to be able to help people. The book received a great response, especially in Aichi Prefecture and other parts of the Tōkai region, and was published in bunkobon form by Gentosha in February 2005. As of 2006, the book has sold more than 2.1 million copies, making it a longtime best seller. At the end of the book, Professor Hiroko Yamamoto of Fujita Health University, who was Aya's doctor, contributed a retrospective, and the bunkobon edition includes a postscript by Shioka describing Aya's final days.

In October 2011, Professor Hirokazu Hirai and his research group at Gunma University announced that they had elucidated part of the mechanism by which spinocerebellar ataxia develops in mouse experiments.
