= Mitsuo Hamada =

Japanese actor (born 1943)

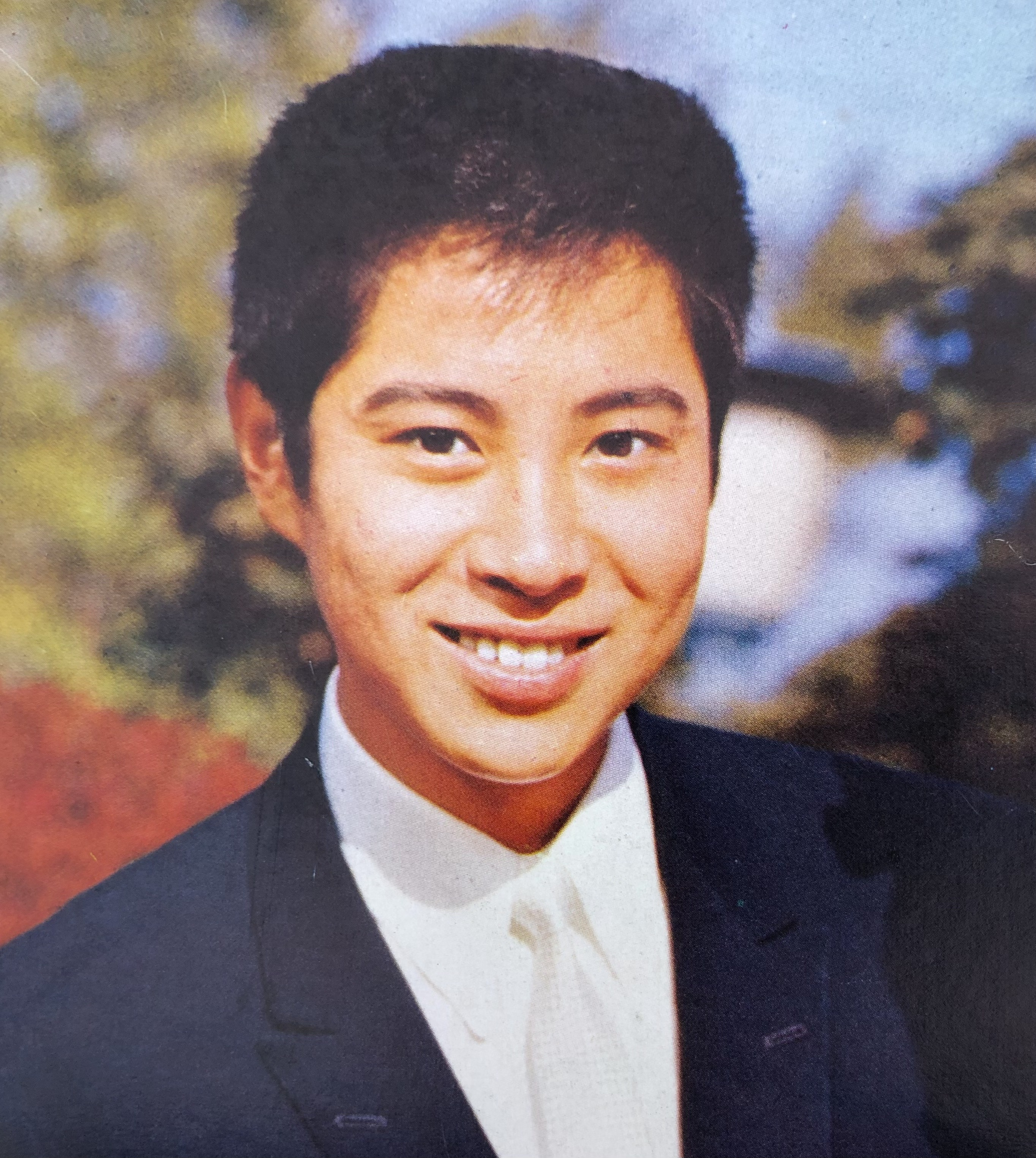
- Born: October 1, 1943 (age 82); Tokyo, Japan
- Occupation: Actor
- Years active: 1955–present
- Website: http://www.art-promotion.jp/prof_male16_hamada.html

Mitsuo Hamada (Japanese: 浜田 光夫, Hepburn: Hamada Mitsuo; born October 1, 1943 in Tokyo) is a Japanese actor. He co-starred with Sayuri Yoshinaga in many Nikkatsu films. In 1960, Hamada joined Nikkatsu Company. He won his first major award at the Elan d'or Awards in 1961. In 1966, Hamada was involved in a quarrel at a bar in Nagoya and came close to losing an eye. The incident hindered his acting career.

Hamada appeared in the Tokusatsu superhero series Ultraman Gaia in 1999.

== Selected filmography ==
=== Film ===
- Foundry Town (1962) : Tsukamoto Katsumi
- Bad Girl (1963)
- Dorodarake no Junjō (1963)
- Utsukushi Jyudai (1964)
- Gazing at Love and Death (1964)
- Izu no Odoriko (1963)
- Outlaw: Gangster VIP (1968) : Tsujikawa Takeo
- Daikanbu Nagurikomi (1969)
- Fuji sanchō (1970) : Sokkō
- Sandakan No. 8 (1974) : Satō
- Karafuto 1945 Summer Hyosetsu no Mon (1974) : Kiyoharu Nakanishi
- KochiKame: Tokyo Beat Cops (1977) as Goro Totsuka
- Inubue (1978)
- Tempyō no Iraka (1980) : Genrō
- A Litre of Tears (2005)
- Enkiri Village: Dead End Survival (2011) : Hongō

=== Television ===
- Taiga drama
  - Ten to Chi to (1969) : Hashiba Hideyoshi
  - Tokugawa Ieyasu (1983) : Ukita Hideie
- Nantatte 18 sai! (1972–73) : Ryūji Minagawa
- Iron King (1972–73) : Goro Kirishima
- Ultraman Gaia (1999) : Kōsuke Ranbashi
