= Anano River =

River in Hokkaidō, Japan

Anano River 穴の川
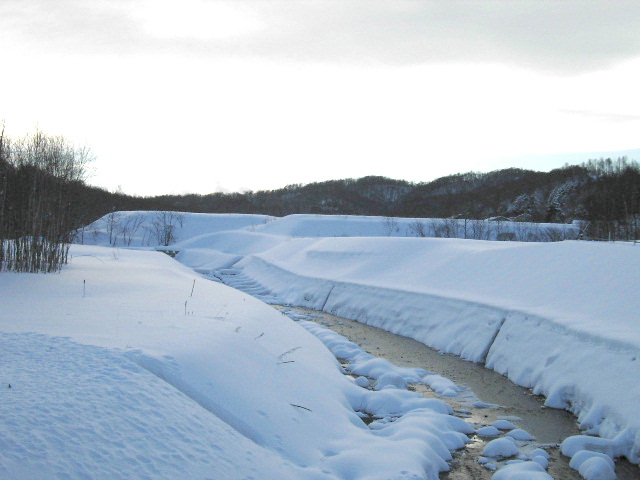
- View to the south from the Ananokawa Bridge (December 2004)

- Location within Japan
- Native name: Ana-no-kawa (Japanese)

Location
- Country: Japan
- State: Hokkaidō
- Region: Isikari
- District: Sapporo
- Municipality: Sapporo

Physical characteristics
- Source: Ishiyama area, Minami-ku
  - location: Sapporo, Hokkaidō, Japan
  - coordinates: 42°56′1″N 141°19′44″E
- Mouth: Toyohira River
  - location: Sapporo, Hokkaidō, Japan
  - coordinates: 42°58′1″N 141°19′55″E
- Length: 9.4 km (5.8 mi)
- Basin size: 8.9 km^{2} (3.4 sq mi)

Anano River (穴の川, Ana-no-kawa) is a river located in the Minami-ku Ishiyama area of southern Sapporo in Hokkaidō, Japan. It is a tributary of the Toyohira River and classified as class A river. It is 9.4 km long and has a catchment area of 8.9 km2.

== Engineering ==
The Sapporo River Work Office built a sand control dam on the Anano River with a sand-retarding basin.
