= Makomanai River =

River in Hokkaidō, Japan

Makomanai River 真駒内川
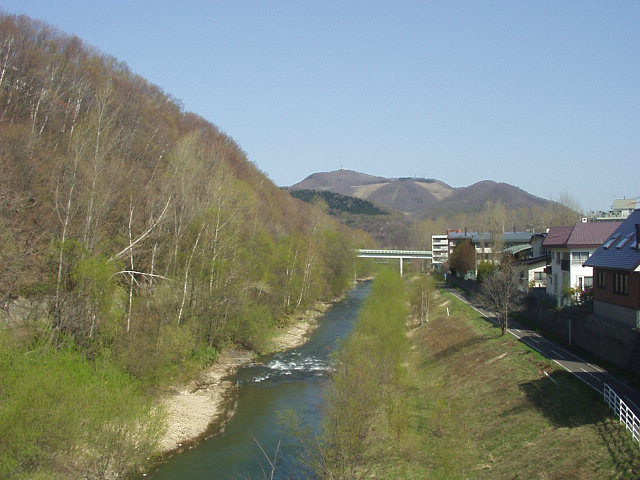
- View northward from the Makomanai Green Heights Bridge in Minami ward, Sapporo. (May 2004)

- Location within Japan
- Etymology: rear river
- Native name: Makomanai-gawa (Japanese)

Location
- Country: Japan
- State: Hokkaidō
- Region: Ishikari
- District: Sapporo
- Municipality: Sapporo

Physical characteristics
- Source: Bankei Pond
  - location: Sapporo, Hokkaidō, Japan
  - coordinates: 42°52′50″N 141°15′36″E
  - elevation: 913 m (2,995 ft)
- Mouth: Toyohira River
  - location: Sapporo, Hokkaidō, Japan
  - coordinates: 43°0′14″N 141°20′41″E
- Length: 21 km (13 mi)
- Basin size: 37 km^{2} (14 sq mi)

Makomanai River (真駒内川, Makomanai-gawa) is a tributary of the Toyohira River in Sapporo, Hokkaidō, Japan. It has a length of 21 kilometres (13 mi) and has a watershed of 37 square kilometres (14 mi^{2}).

Flowing from Bankei Pond (万計沼, Bankei Numa) in the mountains, the Makomanai River's upper course is called Bankei River (万計沢川, Bankeisawa-gawa), too. Its middle course flows through a narrow valley about 200 metres (660 ft) wide in the Tokiwa (常盤) area. Running north, it merges with the Toyohira River at Makomanai area. The Toyohira River flows through the Sapporo city's center. Makomanai means rear river in the Ainu language.

Edwin Dun, an Oyatoi gaikokujin, began development of Makomanai in the 1870s with a pioneer stock farm. The valley of Tokiwa remained undeveloped for a long time. Flood control projects were begun in the later half of 20th century; straightening the river course in the 1960s. Now a residential zone exists along the northern half of Tokiwa along National Route 453. Houses cover the surrounding hilltops around Makomanai. At the confluence with the Toyohira River is Makomanai Park. Cherry salmon migrate to and spawn in the park every year.

== Bibliography ==
- Sapporo-shi Kyōiku Iinkai (Educational Committee of Sapporo City) edited Oyatoi Gaikokujin, Hokkaidō Shinbunsha, Sapporo, 1981. 札幌市教育委員会編『お雇い外国人』、さっぽろ文庫第19巻、北海道新聞社、1981年。
- Sapporo-shi Kyōiku Iinkai (Educational Committee of Sapporo City) edited Kawa no Fuukei (Landscapes of rivers), Hokkaidō Shinbunsha, Sapporo, 1988. 札幌市教育委員会編『川の風景』、さっぽろ文庫第44巻、北海道新聞社、1988年。
- OKADA Asuka, 'Makomanai-Gawa ni okeru Chisui Jigyō' (Flood Control Projects in Makomanai River), 1999 or 2000. 岡田明日香「真駒内川における治水事業」、1999年か2000年。
