= Mount Otofuke =

- 音更山
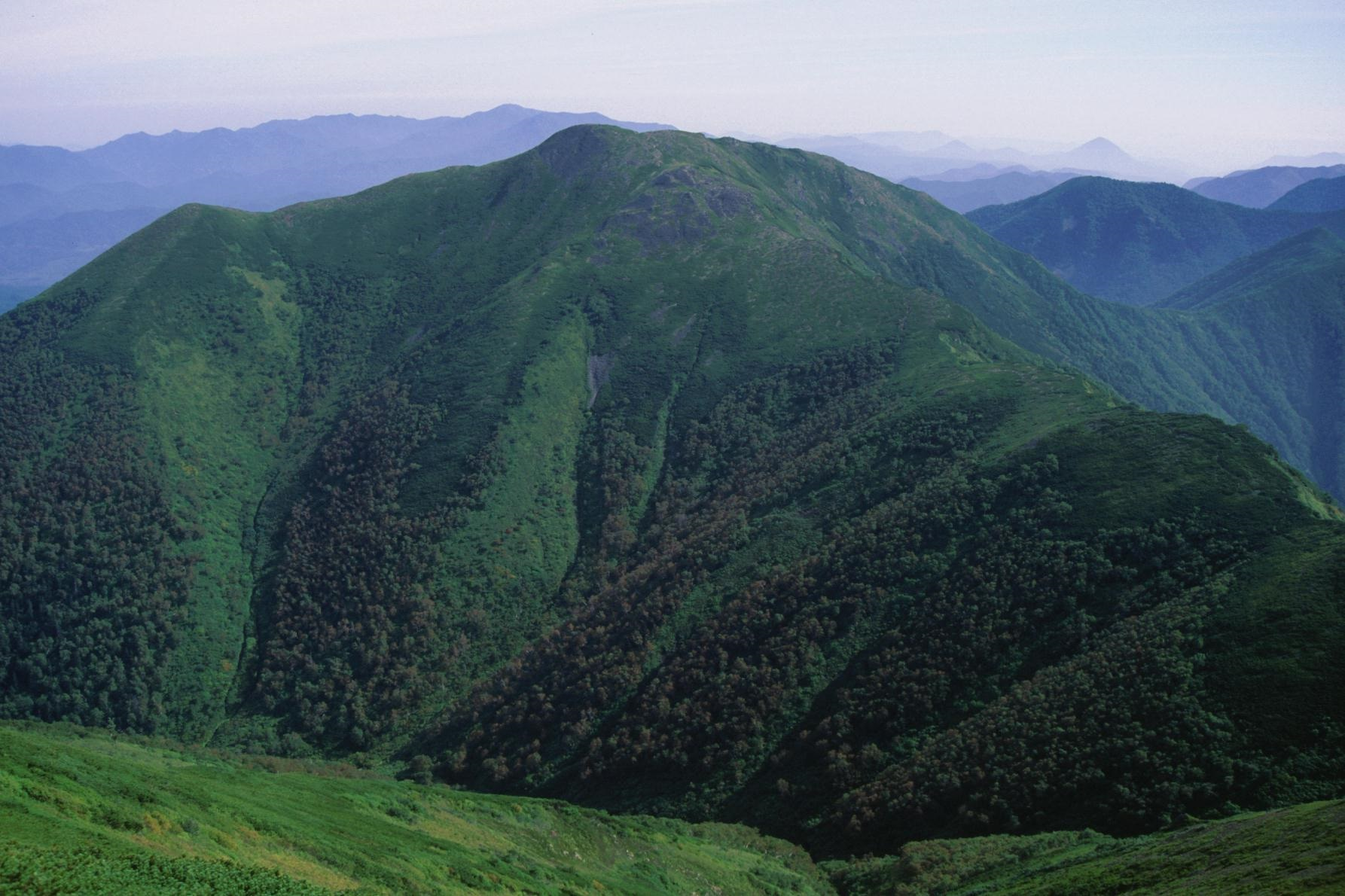
- Mount Otofuke seen from Mount Ishikari

Highest point
- Elevation: 1,932.0 m (6,338.6 ft)
- Prominence: 192 m (630 ft)
- Parent peak: Mount Ishikari
- Listing: List of mountains and hills of Japan by height
- Coordinates: 43°33′42″N 143°2′7″E

Geography
- Location within Japan Location within Hokkaido
- Location: Hokkaidō, Japan
- Parent range: Central Ishikari Mountains
- Topo map(s): Geographical Survey Institute 25000:1 石狩岳; 50000:1 石狩岳

Geology
- Rock age: Early-Middle Eocene
- Mountain type: Pluton
- Volcanic arc: Kurile Arc

Mount Otofuke (音更山, Otofuke-yama) is part of the Ishikari Mountains, Hokkaidō, Japan.
