= Mount Numanohara =

Mountain in Hokkaido, Japan

- 沼ノ原山
- Location within Japan Location within Hokkaido

Highest point
- Elevation: 1,505.6 m (4,940 ft)
- Listing: List of mountains and hills of Japan by height
- Coordinates: 43°31′9″N 142°57′31″E

Geography
- Location: Hokkaidō, Japan
- Parent range: Central Ishikari Mountains
- Topo map(s): Geographical Survey Institute 25000:1 五色ヶ原; 50000:1 旭岳

Geology
- Rock age: Early Pleistocene
- Mountain type: Volcanic
- Volcanic arc: Kurile Arc

Mount Numanohara (沼ノ原山, Numa-no-hara-yama) is part of the Ishikari Mountains, Hokkaidō, Japan.
