= Rio Natsume =

Japanese model (born 1985)

- Born: February 20, 1985 (age 40); Chiba Prefecture, Japan
- Height: 1.56 m (5 ft 1 in)

Rio Natsume (夏目理緒, Rio Natsume; born February 20, 1985) is a Japanese gravure idol. She has released several DVDs and photobooks and has appeared in several TV shows in Japan.

== Career ==
In 2005, Natsume was featured in a video game called "Gal of the Sparrow 2", which also features other popular J-idols such as Chikako Sakuragi, Saori Yamamoto, Yuka Watanabe, Akari, Kaede Shimizu, Hitomi Okada and Hatsune Matsushima. This DVD/video game is sold only in Japan.

In 2009, she came in number seven in the online magazine AskMen.com's list of "Top 10: Japanese Models."

== DVDs ==
- Pure Smile (2003)
- Miss Magazine 2003—Rio Natsume (2003)
- Peach2 no Shizuku (2004)
- Cosplay (2004)
- Go to Beach! (2004)
- Idol One (2004)
- Beach Angels: Rio Natsume in Maldives (2005)
- G-Girl Private+ (2005)
- Idol One: Rio Natsume Special DVD Box (2005)
- Missionary (2005)
- Cow Girl (2005)
- Diary (2005)
- Waterdrop (2005)
- rio no carnival (2005)
- natsume no kajitsu (2005)
- Idol Colosseum 2005-Road to Break! (2006)
- Erotica (2006)
- Milk-T (2006)
- Lemon-T (2006)
- Freedom (2007)
- Love Affair (2007)
- Naked (2008)
- Muse (2008)
- Mature (2008)
- Rio Bravo (2008)
- Moumou (2009)
- Young Sister Style (2009)
- Old Sister Style (2009)
- Lingeriena J (2009)
- My Girl (2010)

== Picture books ==
- R - September 20, 2003 J Cup (2003)
- Rio-chan (2004)
- Rio no kisetsu (2004)
- Yurari (2004)
- Mitsuhime (2005)
- 98 Gram Adventure (2005)
- J&J (2006)

== Sources ==
- "Busty pachinko plugger, 'Queen of the Beautiful Butt' dominate entertainment rankings". Mainichi Shimbun. August 18, 2007. Alt URL
- "夏目 理緒 - Natsume Rio". i-dic.dorachan.com (in Japanese). Archived from the original on 2007-08-21.
- "Natsume Rio (profile)". www.gijo.org. Archived from the original on 2017-11-20.
