= Mount Mikuni =

Mount Mikuni (三国山, Mikuni-san or Mikuni-yama) is the name of several mountains in Japan including:

- Mount Mikuni (Hokkaidō), in the Ishikari Mountains in Hokkaidō
- Mount Mikuni (Gifu), any one of three mountains in Gifu Prefecture
