= Saori Yamamoto =

Japanese gravure idol (born 1985)

- Born: November 16, 1985 (age 40); Tokyo, Japan
- Years active: 2002–2011
- Height: 1.65 m (5 ft 5 in)
- Website: http://www.yamamotosaori.net/

Saori Yamamoto (山本早織, Yamamoto Saori; born November 16, 1985) is a Japanese businesswoman and former gravure idol from Tokyo, Japan.

Although not well known outside Japan, she's one of the most famous Japanese idols in Japan. She is well known for her prodigious breasts although their reported size is greatly disputed, particularly for a woman her size.

== Biography ==
Saori Yamamoto was born and raised in Tokyo. She began modeling at the age of 15. After a few months, her career took off. She released her first DVD a year later called Pure Smile.

Saori has appeared in many stage productions and television shows in Japan. Her first non-solo DVD appearances were in the high action movie Bra Shooter. In addition to modeling and acting, she currently plays for a Japanese soccer team called Team Spazio

Like many J-idols, Saori Yamamoto was also featured in a video game/DVD called Gal of the Sparrow 2, which she announced at 2005's Tokyo Game Show. This DVD features other popular J-idols such as Chikako Sakuragi, Rio Natsume, Yuka Watanabe, Akari, Kaede Shimizu, Hitomi Okada and Hatsune Matsushima. This DVD/video game is only for sale in Japan.

In 2011, she dated soccer player Kazuhisa Kawahara (then a member of Ehime FC), but the president of her agency at the time forced her to break up with him. Cornered, she lost her mental balance, and decided to retire from the entertainment industry at the age of 26. After that, she started working part-time as a hostess in Ginza. She later married Kawahara in 2012, but the couple divorced on January 3, 2013. She later remarried to a businessman in May 2018.

After her retirement, she worked as a flower designer. Currently, she runs a marriage counseling business and a matchmaker bar.

== CD releases ==
- Toki (3/20/2004)

== DVD releases ==
- Protea (05/2002)
- Pure Smile (05/2003)
- ぴちぴちピーチ! Pichi Pichi Peach! (08/21/2003)
- Saory (11/28/2003)
- ぷりぷりプリン! Idol One: Puripuri Purin! (03/20/2004)
- Saori no Tenshi in Seoul Q (06/25/2004)
- 山本早織:Letter (07/25/2004)
- 妹・早織 (10/22/2004)
- VIVA!そら。真っさお。Viva! Sora Massao (11/25/2004)
- 起きて。ワタシ Okite. Watashi (2/25/2005)
- AMUSE (04/25/2005)
- ぷりんアラモードBOX Purin Alamode Box (05/20/05)
- APPLE (6/25/2005)
- Idol One - Dai 3 Dan Saori Yamamoro / Saorita Thank You 19 (10/20/2005)
- Idol One Dai 4 Dan - Saori Yamamoto / Yamamoro Welcome 20 (11/20/2005)
- Orihime (02/24/2006)
- Asatte-Dance (03/23/2006)
- Kawaru Watashi (06/28/2006)
- Destiny (08/01/2006)

== Photograph set ==
- 3年5組38番 3 year 5 set 38th page 96 digital B COM (Photograph Set) (1/23/2004)
- Sun‐Chu! (Photograph Collection) (3/27/2004)
- Delusion (02/2006)

== V-Cinema ==
- Taima Angel Bizarre Shooter Bishojo Senshi Sara Kenzan (退魔天使 ビザール・シューター 美少女戦士沙良見参!), June 12, 2005
- Hazard Saga, April 28, 2006
- Hazard Angel Crimson, May 12, 2006
- Hazard Angel Darkness, May 26, 2006
- Kyodai Heroine MARIYA -Korin- (巨大ヒロインMARIYA -降臨-), June 9, 2006
- Kyodai Heroine MARIYA -Sairin- (巨大ヒロインMARIYA -最臨-), July 14, 2006
- Homeless Shojo ～Bombie Girl no Koi～(ホームレス少女 ～貧乏少女の恋～), June 25, 2008

== Theatrical films ==
- Enkiri Village: Dead End Survival (2011)
