= Hōheikyō Dam =

Coordinates: 42°54′57″N 141°09′13″E

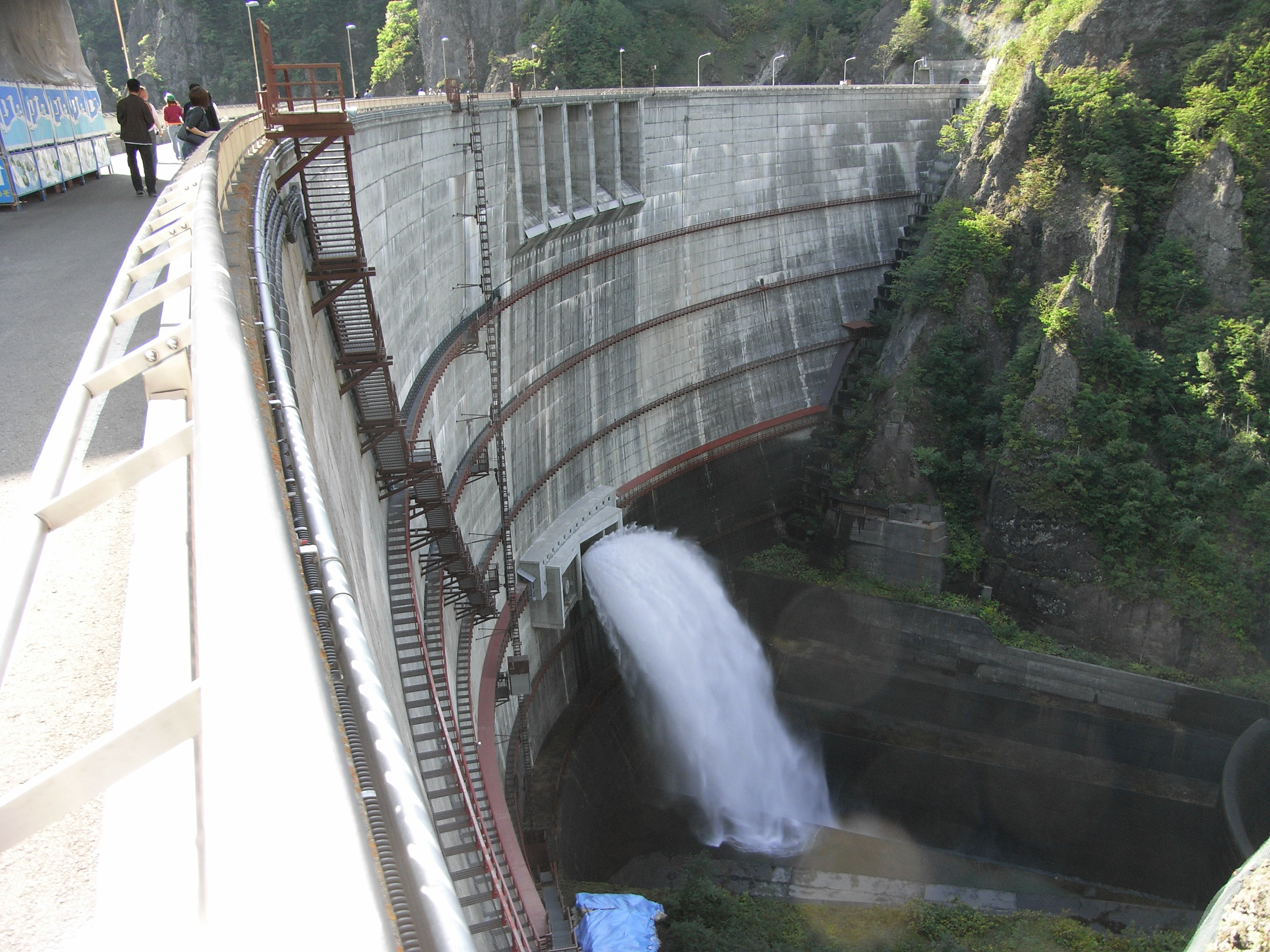

- Location within Japan Location within Hokkaido Location within Sapporo
- Interactive map of Hōheikyō Dam
- Location: Hokkaidō, Japan
- Construction began: 1965
- Opening date: 1972

Dam and spillways
- Impounds: Toyohira River
- Height: 102.5 m
- Length: 305 m

Reservoir
- Creates: Lake Jōzan
- Total capacity: 47,100,000 m^{3}
- Catchment area: 184 km^{2}
- Surface area: 150 hectares

Hōheikyō Dam (Japanese: 豊平峡ダム, Hepburn: Hōhei-kyō Damu) is a concrete Arch dam in Sapporo, Hokkaidō; Japan. It dams the Toyohira River. It is situated in Toya National Park. The dam was created for Irrigation as well as Flood control. The road leading to the dam has been closed off for regular car use, instead Hybrid electric buses are operated so the natural environment is protected. The dam's lake is known as Jozan Lake (定山湖),

== Development ==
The construction of the dam began in 1965 and in 1972 the multipurpose dam was completed.
