= A Litre of Tears (film) =

- Japanese DVD cover of this film
- Directed by: Riki Okamura
- Screenplay by: Takao Tanaka; Bunta Yamamoto
- Based on: 1 Litre no Namida by Aya Kito
- Starring: Yoshimi Ashikawa; Mitsuo Hamada; Yoneko Matsukane; Asae Oonishi
- Release date: 10 February 2005 (Japan)
- Running time: 98 minutes
- Country: Japan
- Language: Japanese

A Litre of Tears (1リットルの涙, 1 Rittoru no Namida; literally "1 Litre of Tears") is a film based on Aya Kito (木藤亜也, Kitō Aya; July 19, 1962 – May 23, 1988)'s memoir, 1 Litre no Namida.

Asae Ōnishi is the lead actress, starring as Aya Kito. 9th grader (third year of junior high school) Aya Kito collapses on the way to school. Dr. Yamamoto discovers that Aya has spinocerebellar ataxia, a fatal and incurable disease that handicaps the body. Aya's mother, Shioka Kito (木藤 潮香, Kitō Shioka) and Dr. Yamamoto let Aya record in a diary to tell her story and to live her life to the fullest.
