= Mount Mikuni (Hokkaido) =

Mountain in the country of Japan

- 三国山
- Location within Japan Location within Hokkaido

Highest point
- Elevation: 1,541.4 m (5,057 ft)
- Listing: List of mountains and hills of Japan by height
- Coordinates: 43°35′43″N 143°8′47″E

Geography
- Location: Hokkaidō, Japan
- Parent range: Central Ishikari Mountains
- Topo map(s): Geographical Survey Institute 25000:1 石北峠; 50000:1 石狩岳

Geology
- Rock age: Middle-Late Miocene
- Mountain type: Volcanic
- Volcanic arc: Kurile Arc

Mount Mikuni (三国山, Mikuni-san) is part of the Ishikari Mountains, Hokkaidō, Japan.
