= Nantatte 18 sai! =

- Genre: Drama
- Starring: Yuki Okazaki; Sei Hiraizumi; Jun Tazaki; Haruko Kato; Mitsuo Hamada
- Country of origin: Japan
- Original language: Japanese
- No. of episodes: 52

Original release
- Network: TBS
- Release: October 5, 1971 – September 26, 1972

Nantatte 18 sai! (なんたって18歳!) is a Japanese television drama series that first aired on TBS in 1971.

== Cast ==
- Yuki Okazaki
- Sei Hiraizumi
- Jun Tazaki
- Haruko Kato
- Mitsuo Hamada
