= Toyohira River =

River in Hokkaido, Japan

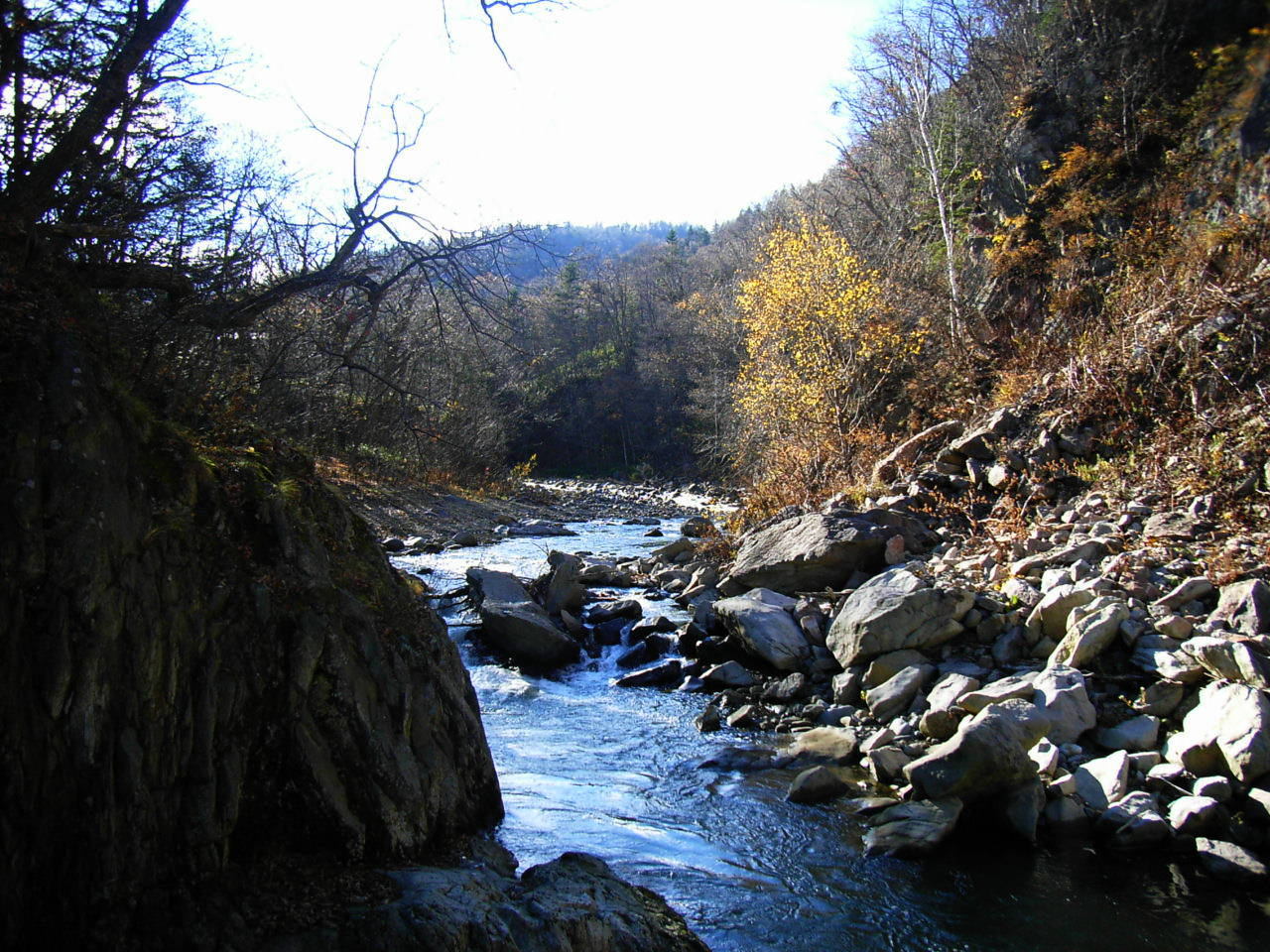
- The Toyohira River at Jōzankei

- Location within Japan
- Native name: 豊平川 (Japanese)

Location
- Country: Japan
- State: Hokkaido

Physical characteristics
- Source: Oizaridake (小漁岳)
  - location: Sapporo, Hokkaido, Japan
  - coordinates: 42°47′31″N 141°13′0″E
  - elevation: 850 m (2,790 ft)
- Mouth: Ishikari River
  - location: Sapporo and Ebetsu, Hokkaido, Japan
  - coordinates: 43°9′4″N 141°26′58″E
  - elevation: 2 m (6 ft 7 in)
- Length: 72.5 km (45.0 mi)
- Basin size: 894.7 km^{2} (345.4 sq mi)

The Toyohira River (豊平川, Toyohira-gawa) is a river in Hokkaido, Japan. It is 72.5 km in length and has drainage area of 894.7 km². It is a tributary of the Ishikari River.

It supplies water to Sapporo city, the capital of Hokkaido built on the alluvial fan formed by the river. Jōzankei is a popular attraction with onsen (hot springs) along the upper Toyohira.

== Course ==
From the mountain Oizaridake, the Toyohira River flows northwards into Lake Jōzan (定山湖, Jōzan-ko). The Hōheikyō Dam (豊平峡ダム, Hōhei-kyō Damu) created the lake. The river runs through the gorge. After exiting the gorge it is joined by several more rivers before turning East. Two smaller dams block the course of the Toyohira as it moves into the suburbs of Sapporo. The river flows north and east through the middle of the Toyohira Ward of Sapporo. As it leaves the urban area it forms the border between Sapporo and Ebetsu before emptying into the Ishikari River.

Toyohira River running through Jōzankei, Sapporo

== History ==
The Ainu knew this river as Sapporo / Sat Poro Pet (サッ・ポロ・ペッ; literally ‘dry, great river’). Toyopira was originally the name of a crossing point of the Sapporo River. Until the 19th century, the lower course of the Sapporo River had been the same as the Fushiko River of today, emptying into the Ishikari River directly to the north. After a flood, the river made a new course to the east. The Ainu call the remains of this old lower course of the Sapporo River Fushiko Sapporo or Old Sapporo.

When the Japanese colonized the area, they used Ainu place names. They named the new capital city after the river Sapporo and named the Sapporo River (Sapporo Pet) after the crossing point Toyohira. The old lower course of the Fushiko Sapporo was named Fushiko River (伏籠川, Fushiko Kawa). The Toyohira Bridge was built at the crossing point named Toyopira by the Ainu.

== Tributaries ==
- Anano River
- Makomanai River
