= Nipesotsu-Maruyama Volcanic Group =

Japanese volcanoes

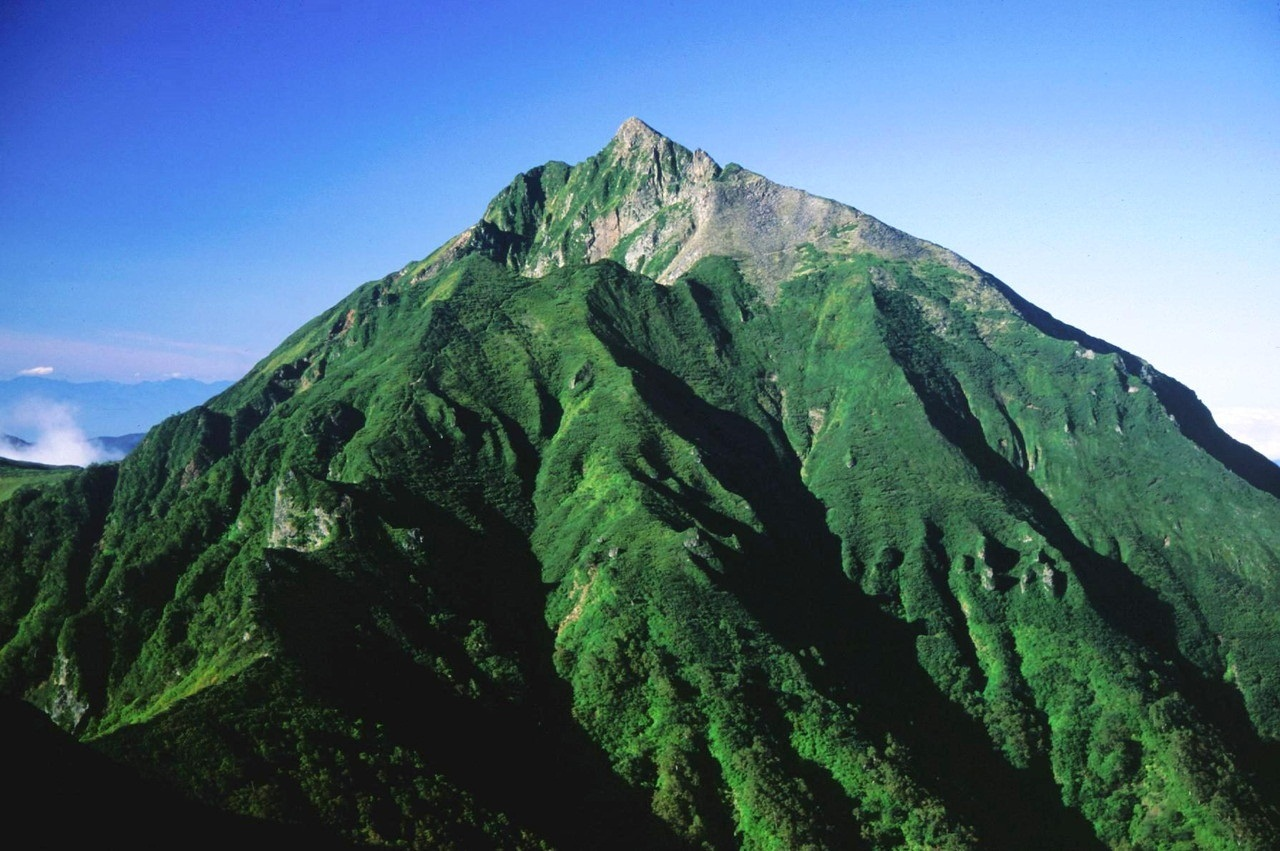
- Mount Nipesotsu from Mount Tengu

Highest point
- Peak: Mount Nipesotsu
- Elevation: 2,012.9 m (6,604 ft)
- Coordinates: 43°27′22″N 143°1′56″E

Naming
- Native name: ニペソツ・丸山火山群; Nipesotsu-Maruyama-kazangun

Geography
- Location within Japan Location within Hokkaido
- Country: Japan
- State: Hokkaidō
- Subprefecture: Tokachi
- Districts: Katō; Kamikawa
- Municipalities: Kamishihoro; Shintoku
- Parent range: Ishikari Mountains
- Biome: alpine climate

Geology
- Orogeny: island arc
- Rock age: Quaternary
- Rock type: volcanic

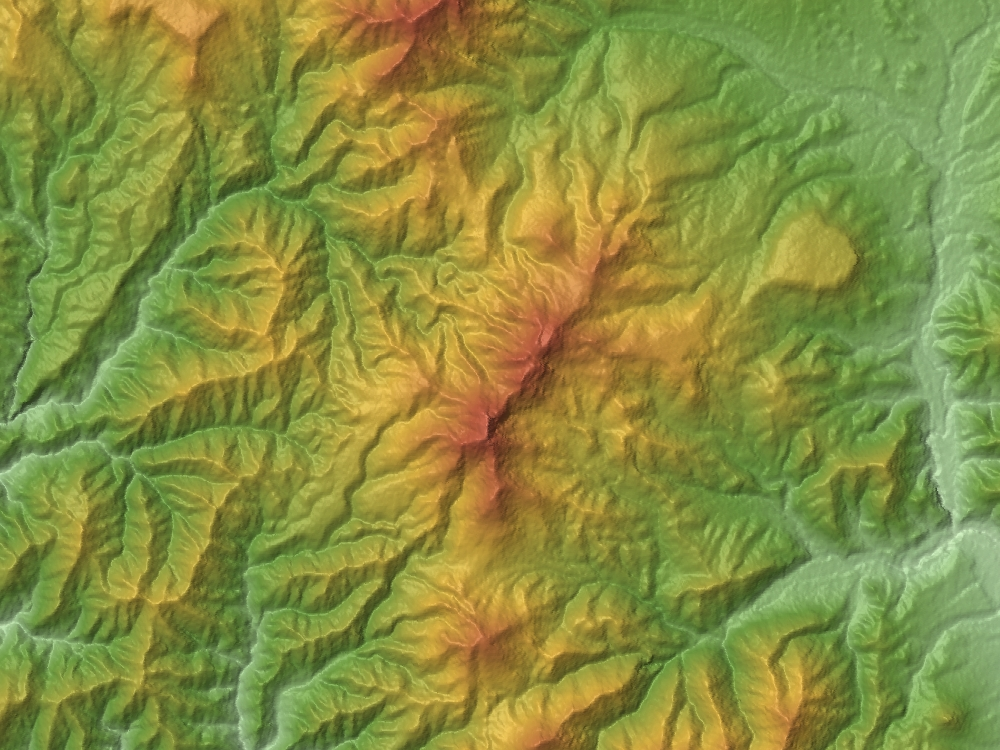
Relief Map Mount Nipesotsu (center) Mount Maru (bottom)

Nipesotsu-Maruyama is a volcanic group situated in Hokkaidō, Japan.

It is composed of several stratovolcanoes and lava domes, including:

- Mount Nipesotsu
- Mount Maru (Kamishihoro-Shintoku)
- Mount Tengu
- Mount Kotengu
- Mount Gunkan
- 1332 Meter Peak
- Mount Upepesanke

== See also ==
- List of volcanoes in Japan
