= Mount Nipesotsu =

Lava dome on the island of Hokkaido, Japan

- ニペソツ山
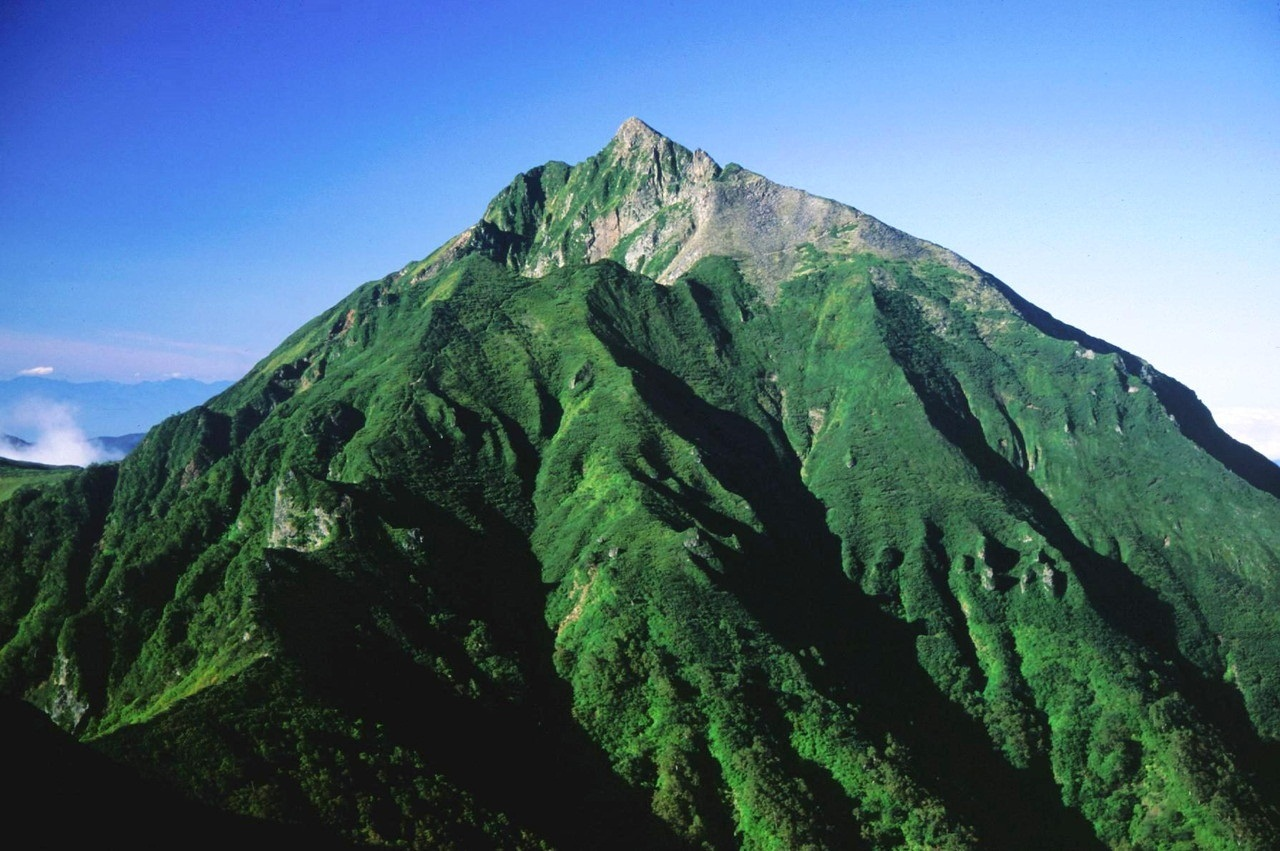

Highest point
- Elevation: 2,012.9 m (6,604 ft)
- Listing: List of mountains and hills of Japan by height List of volcanoes by elevation
- Coordinates: 43°27′21″N 143°1′56″E

Geography
- Location within Japan Location within Hokkaido
- Location: Hokkaido, Japan
- Parent range: Nipesotsu-Maruyama Volcanic Group
- Topo map(s): Geographical Survey Institute 25000:1 ニペソツ山; 50000:1 糠平

Geology
- Mountain type: lava dome
- Volcanic arc: Kurile Arc

Mount Nipesotsu (ニペソツ山, Nipesotsu-yama) is a lava dome located in the Nipesotsu-Maruyama Volcanic Group of the Ishikari Mountains, Hokkaido, Japan.

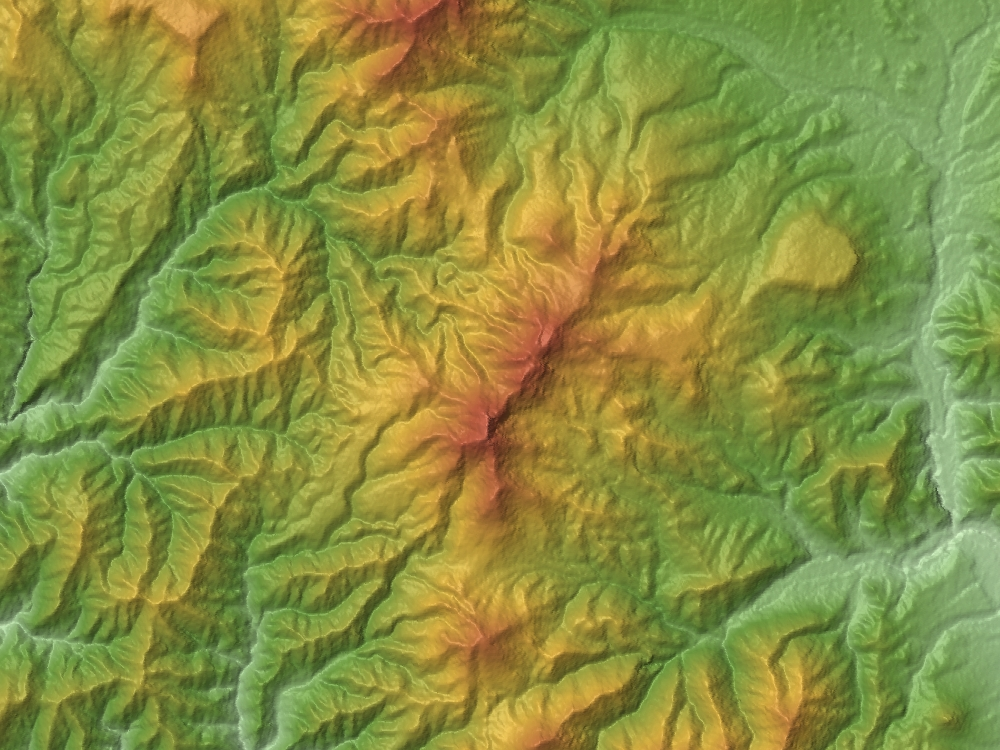
Nipesotsu-Maruyama Volcanic Group Mount Nipesotsu (center) Mount Maru (bottom)

== See also ==
- List of volcanoes in Japan
- List of mountains in Japan
