= Kamishihoro, Hokkaido =

Town in Japan

Kamishihoro 上士幌町 Kamishihoro-chō
- Town
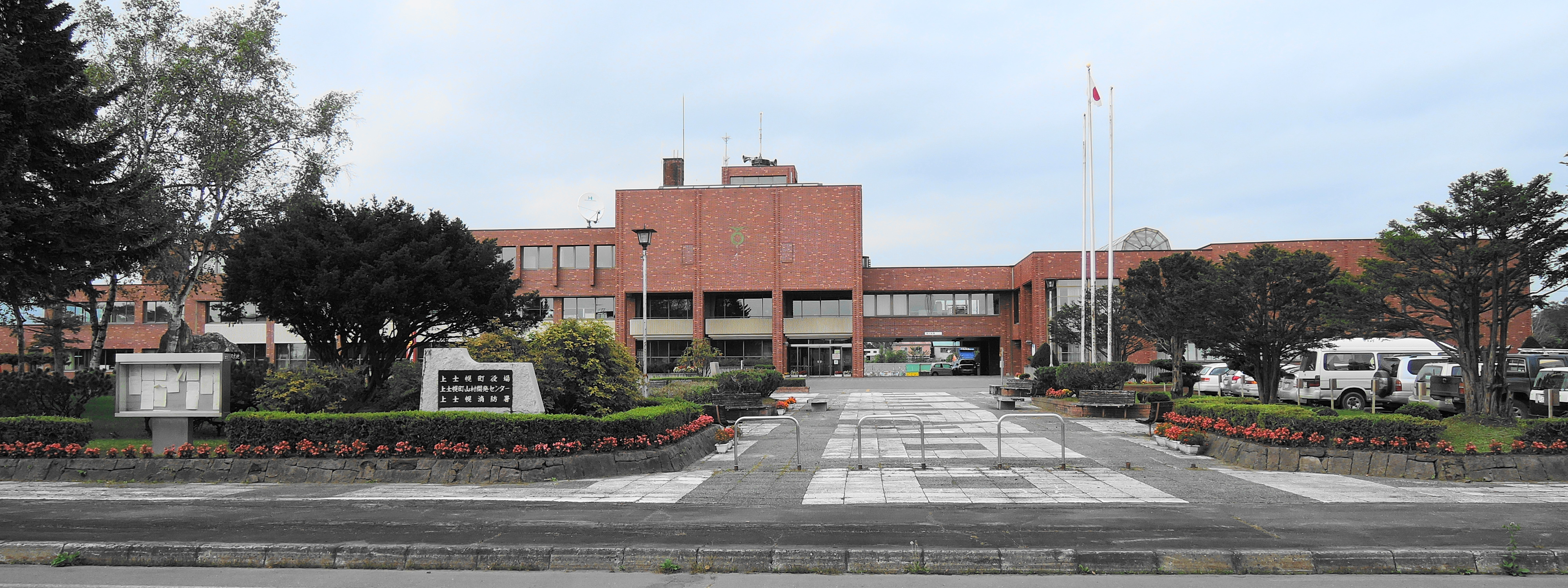
- Kamishihoro Town Hall

- Flag Emblem

- Location of Kamishihoro in Hokkaido (Tokachi Subprefecture)
- Interactive map of Kamishihoro
- Coordinates: 43°13′58″N 143°17′45″E
- Country: Japan
- Region: Hokkaido
- Prefecture: Hokkaido (Tokachi Subprefecture)
- District: Katō

Area
  - Total: 694.23 km^{2} (268.04 sq mi)

Population (December 31, 2025)
  - Total: 4,677
  - Density: 6.737/km^{2} (17.45/sq mi)
- Time zone: UTC+09:00 (JST)
- City hall address: 238 Kamishihoro Higashi 3-sen, Kamishihoro-cho, Kato-gun, Hokkaido 080-1492
- Climate: Dfb
- Website: www.kamishihoro.jp
- Symbols
- Bird: Common cuckoo
- Flower: Lily-of-the-valley
- Tree: Japanese white birch

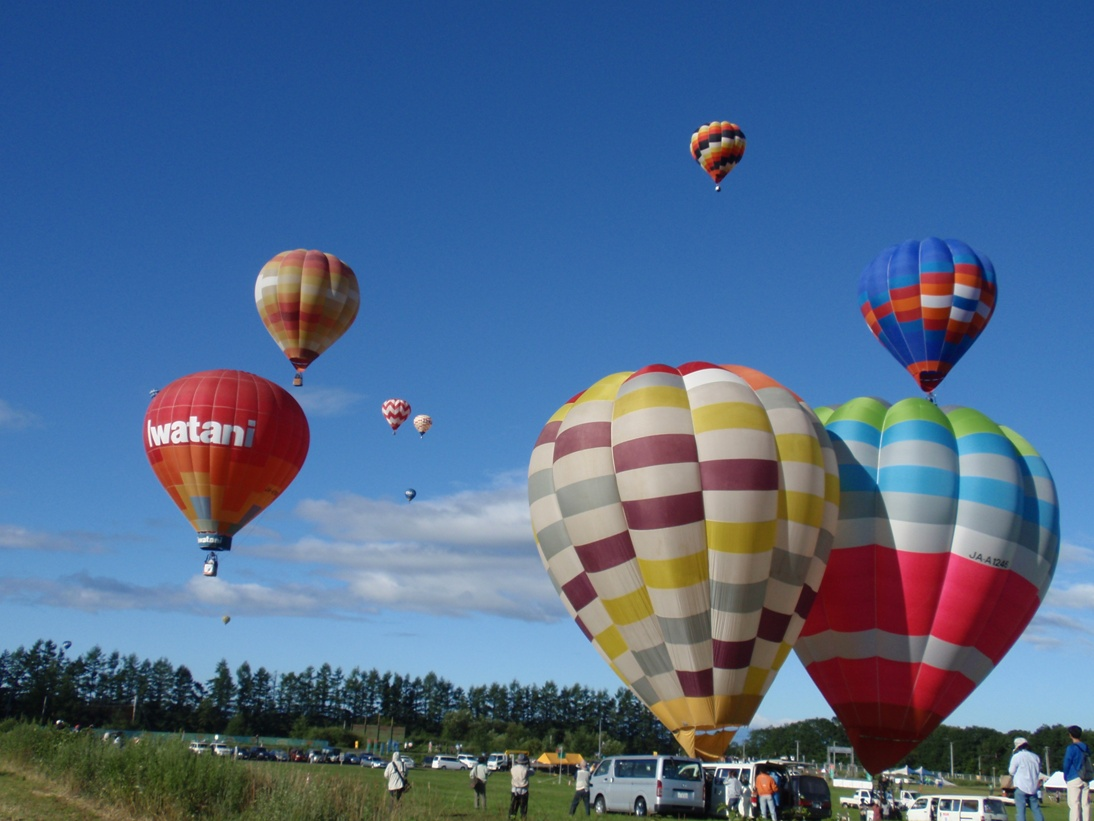
Hokkaido Balloon festival

Kamishihoro (上士幌町, Kamishihoro-chō) is a town located in Tokachi Subprefecture, Hokkaidō, Japan. As of 31 December 2025, the town had an estimated population of 4,677 in 2578 households, and a population density of 5 people per km^{2}. The total area of the town is 694.23 km^{2} (268.04 sq mi).

== Geography ==
Kamishoro is located in southeastern Hokkaido in the north-central part of the Tokachi Subprefecture. Approximately 80% of the town's area is mountainous and wilderness. The northern part of the town is mountainous, located at the eastern foot of Daisetsuzan National Park. Furthermore, except for the Tokachi-Mitamata mountain basin, there is little flat land. On the other hand, the southern part of the town is generally flat and hilly with gentle slopes.

=== Neighboring municipalities ===
Kitami

Shintoku

Shikaoi

Shihoro

Honbetsu

Ashoro

Kamikawa

Oketo

=== Climate ===
According to the Köppen climate classification, Kamishihoro has a humid continental climate to subarctic climate (Dfb). It receives heavy snowfall and is designated as a heavy snow area.

Climate data for Kamishihoro（1991 - 2020）
Month	Jan	Feb	Mar	Apr	May	Jun	Jul	Aug	Sep	Oct	Nov	Dec	Year
Record high °C (°F)	6.4 (43.5)	12.8 (55.0)	16.1 (61.0)	28.2 (82.8)	36.4 (97.5)	36.6 (97.9)	37.2 (99.0)	35.2 (95.4)	31.5 (88.7)	27.8 (82.0)	20.0 (68.0)	11.9 (53.4)	37.2 (99.0)
Mean daily maximum °C (°F)	−2.9 (26.8)	−2.0 (28.4)	2.6 (36.7)	10.1 (50.2)	16.5 (61.7)	19.9 (67.8)	22.9 (73.2)	23.9 (75.0)	20.4 (68.7)	14.2 (57.6)	6.6 (43.9)	−0.5 (31.1)	11.0 (51.8)
Daily mean °C (°F)	−7.7 (18.1)	−7.1 (19.2)	−2.3 (27.9)	4.3 (39.7)	10.4 (50.7)	14.2 (57.6)	17.8 (64.0)	18.9 (66.0)	15.2 (59.4)	8.8 (47.8)	2.0 (35.6)	−4.8 (23.4)	5.8 (42.4)
Mean daily minimum °C (°F)	−13.4 (7.9)	−13.2 (8.2)	−7.7 (18.1)	−1.0 (30.2)	4.6 (40.3)	9.5 (49.1)	13.8 (56.8)	15.0 (59.0)	10.7 (51.3)	3.7 (38.7)	−2.7 (27.1)	−10.0 (14.0)	0.8 (33.4)
Record low °C (°F)	−24.9 (−12.8)	−25.9 (−14.6)	−21.3 (−6.3)	−13.7 (7.3)	−5.4 (22.3)	−0.4 (31.3)	4.7 (40.5)	5.1 (41.2)	−0.4 (31.3)	−6.5 (20.3)	−14.2 (6.4)	−20.8 (−5.4)	−25.9 (−14.6)
Average precipitation mm (inches)	30.9 (1.22)	21.5 (0.85)	39.9 (1.57)	62.0 (2.44)	98.5 (3.88)	91.6 (3.61)	134.4 (5.29)	175.4 (6.91)	149.1 (5.87)	88.2 (3.47)	51.4 (2.02)	40.0 (1.57)	981.7 (38.65)
Average snowfall cm (inches)	87 (34)	76 (30)	77 (30)	19 (7.5)	4 (1.6)	0 (0)	0 (0)	0 (0)	0 (0)	0 (0)	19 (7.5)	74 (29)	363 (143)
Average precipitation days (≥ 1.0 mm)	5.8	4.8	7.8	9.5	10.9	10.6	12.8	13.2	11.9	8.9	7.7	6.5	110.3
Mean monthly sunshine hours	155.0	151.9	190.3	178.5	169.4	134.9	111.1	115.4	138.9	168.1	147.4	141.3	1,804.1
Source 1: Japan Meteorological Agency
Source 2: JMA

Climate data for Nukabira Hot Springs（1991 - 2020）
Month	Jan	Feb	Mar	Apr	May	Jun	Jul	Aug	Sep	Oct	Nov	Dec	Year
Record high °C (°F)	6.9 (44.4)	12.8 (55.0)	15.5 (59.9)	26.7 (80.1)	34.5 (94.1)	33.7 (92.7)	34.2 (93.6)	33.4 (92.1)	32.3 (90.1)	26.5 (79.7)	19.8 (67.6)	11.1 (52.0)	34.5 (94.1)
Mean daily maximum °C (°F)	−4.1 (24.6)	−3.1 (26.4)	1.3 (34.3)	8.4 (47.1)	15.6 (60.1)	19.2 (66.6)	22.3 (72.1)	22.7 (72.9)	19.0 (66.2)	12.8 (55.0)	5.0 (41.0)	−1.9 (28.6)	9.8 (49.6)
Daily mean °C (°F)	−10.5 (13.1)	−9.4 (15.1)	−4.3 (24.3)	2.4 (36.3)	8.9 (48.0)	13.3 (55.9)	17.1 (62.8)	17.5 (63.5)	13.1 (55.6)	6.6 (43.9)	0.0 (32.0)	−7.1 (19.2)	4.0 (39.2)
Mean daily minimum °C (°F)	−16.9 (1.6)	−16.4 (2.5)	−10.7 (12.7)	−3.2 (26.2)	2.5 (36.5)	8.1 (46.6)	12.8 (55.0)	13.3 (55.9)	8.1 (46.6)	1.1 (34.0)	−4.7 (23.5)	−12.5 (9.5)	−1.5 (29.3)
Record low °C (°F)	−30.3 (−22.5)	−30.8 (−23.4)	−26.7 (−16.1)	−19.0 (−2.2)	−7.6 (18.3)	−1.9 (28.6)	2.0 (35.6)	2.7 (36.9)	−2.0 (28.4)	−7.1 (19.2)	−17.4 (0.7)	−26.6 (−15.9)	−30.8 (−23.4)
Average precipitation mm (inches)	48.5 (1.91)	39.1 (1.54)	64.8 (2.55)	84.5 (3.33)	129.7 (5.11)	110.9 (4.37)	147.6 (5.81)	213.6 (8.41)	208.1 (8.19)	153.6 (6.05)	108.2 (4.26)	74.1 (2.92)	1,382.6 (54.43)
Average snowfall cm (inches)	103 (41)	83 (33)	100 (39)	57 (22)	3 (1.2)	0 (0)	0 (0)	0 (0)	0 (0)	2 (0.8)	45 (18)	104 (41)	494 (194)
Average precipitation days (≥ 1.0 mm)	8.2	8.4	10.6	11.3	11.6	10.2	10.9	11.6	11.8	11.7	12.4	10.2	128.8
Mean monthly sunshine hours	120.5	125.3	164.0	181.0	195.7	163.9	155.7	141.2	139.0	161.7	119.1	109.0	1,776

=== Demographics ===
Per Japanese census data, the population of Kamishihoro has declined in recent decades.

Historical population
Year	Pop.	±%
1970	9,135	—
1980	7,571	−17.1%
1990	6,380	−15.7%
2000	5,634	−11.7%
2010	5,078	−9.9%
2020	4,778	−5.9%

== History ==
Tokachi's development began in 1896, with settlers arriving from outside Hokkaido. However, the Kamishihoro area was initially undeveloped due to its location in the interior of Tokachi, inconvenient transportation, and poor climate and soil fertility. As development in Tokachi progressed, some people moved to the Kamishihoro area in 1907 in search of larger tracts of land. With the opening of the Shihoro Line from Obihiro Station to Kamishihoro Station in 1926, the number of settlers in the Kamishihoro area increased. In 1929, there was growing interest in separating the village from Shihoro Village (now Shihoro Town), and Kamishihoro Village was established on April 1, 1931. It was raised to town status in 1954.

== Government ==
Kamishihoro has a mayor-council form of government with a directly elected mayor and a unicameral town council of 11 members. Kamishihoro, as part of Tokachi Subprefecture, contributes four members to the Hokkaidō Prefectural Assembly. In terms of national politics, the town is part of the Hokkaidō 11th district of the lower house of the Diet of Japan.

== Economy ==
The main economic activities in Kamishihoro are primary industries such as agriculture (field crops, dairy farming) and forestry, as well as the tertiary industry of tourism.

== Education ==
Kamishihoro has one public elementary school and one public middle school operated by the town. The town has one public high school operated by the Hokkaido Board of Education.

== Transportation ==
=== Railways ===
Kamishihoro has not had any passenger railway service since the discontinuation of the JR Hokkaido Shihoro Line in 1983. The nearest train station is Obihiro Station on the Nemuro Main Line.

=== Highways ===
- National Route 241
- National Route 273

== Local attractions ==
- Kamishihoro- Railway Museum
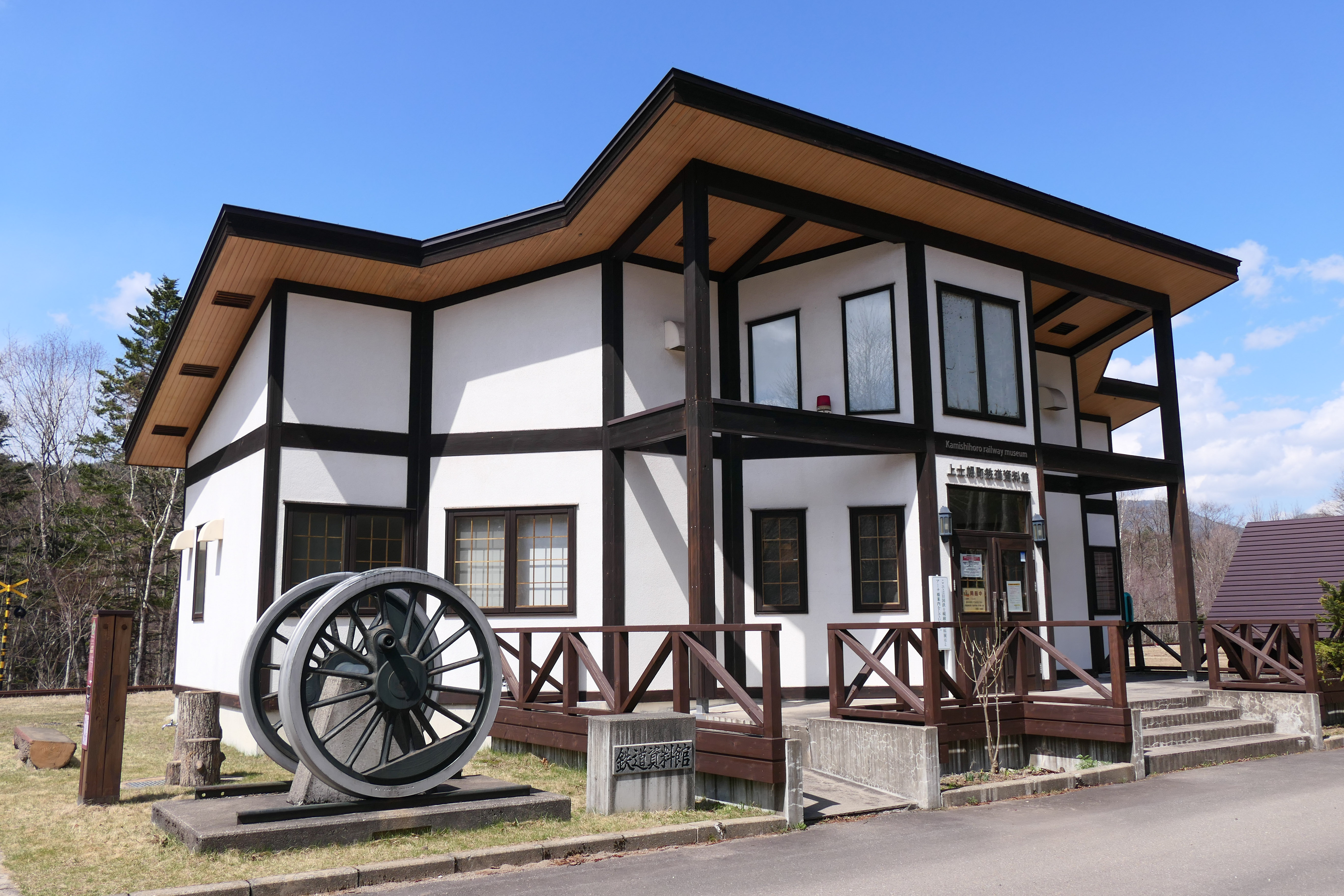
Kamishihoro- Railway Museum

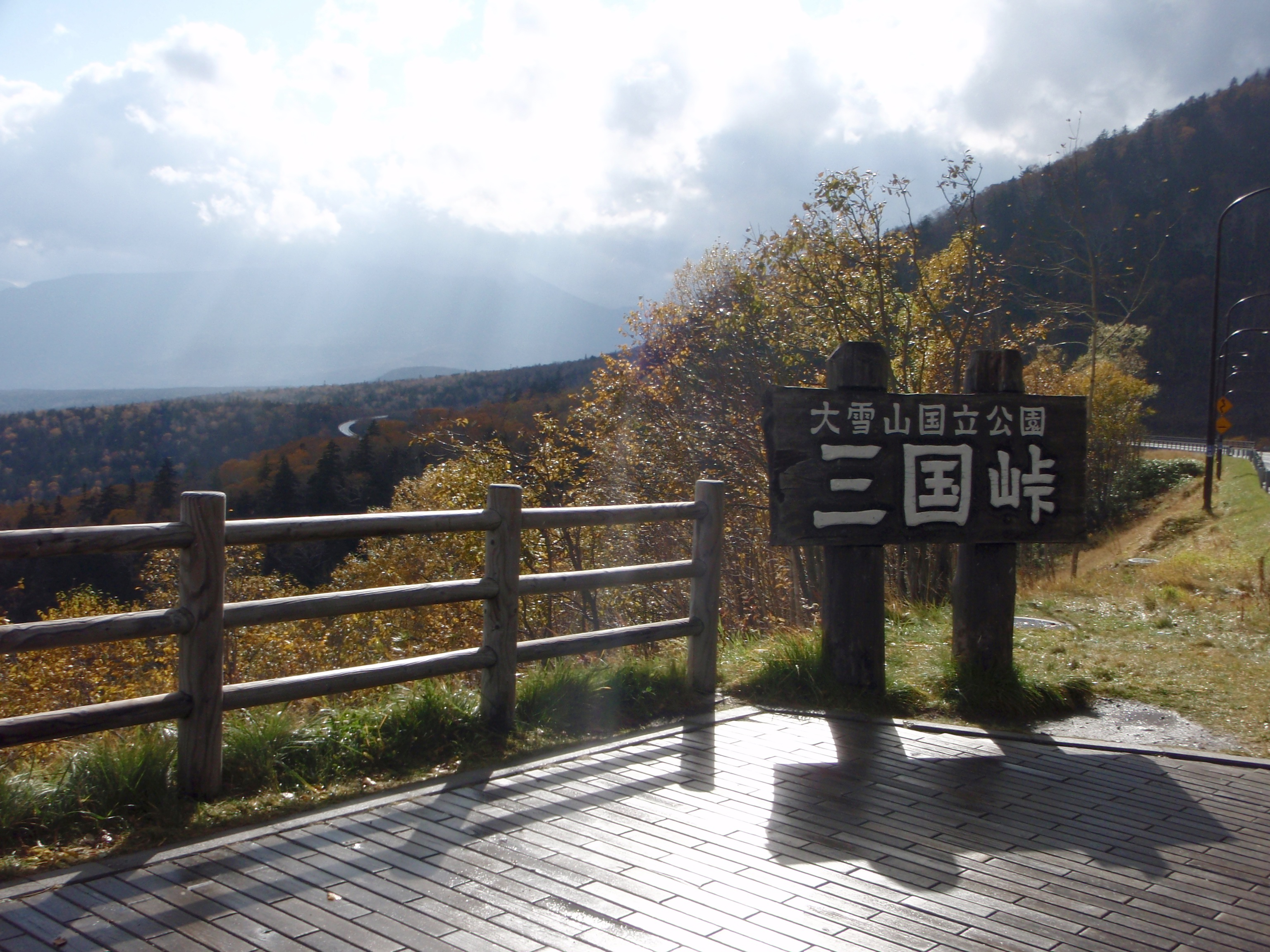
Mikuni Pass

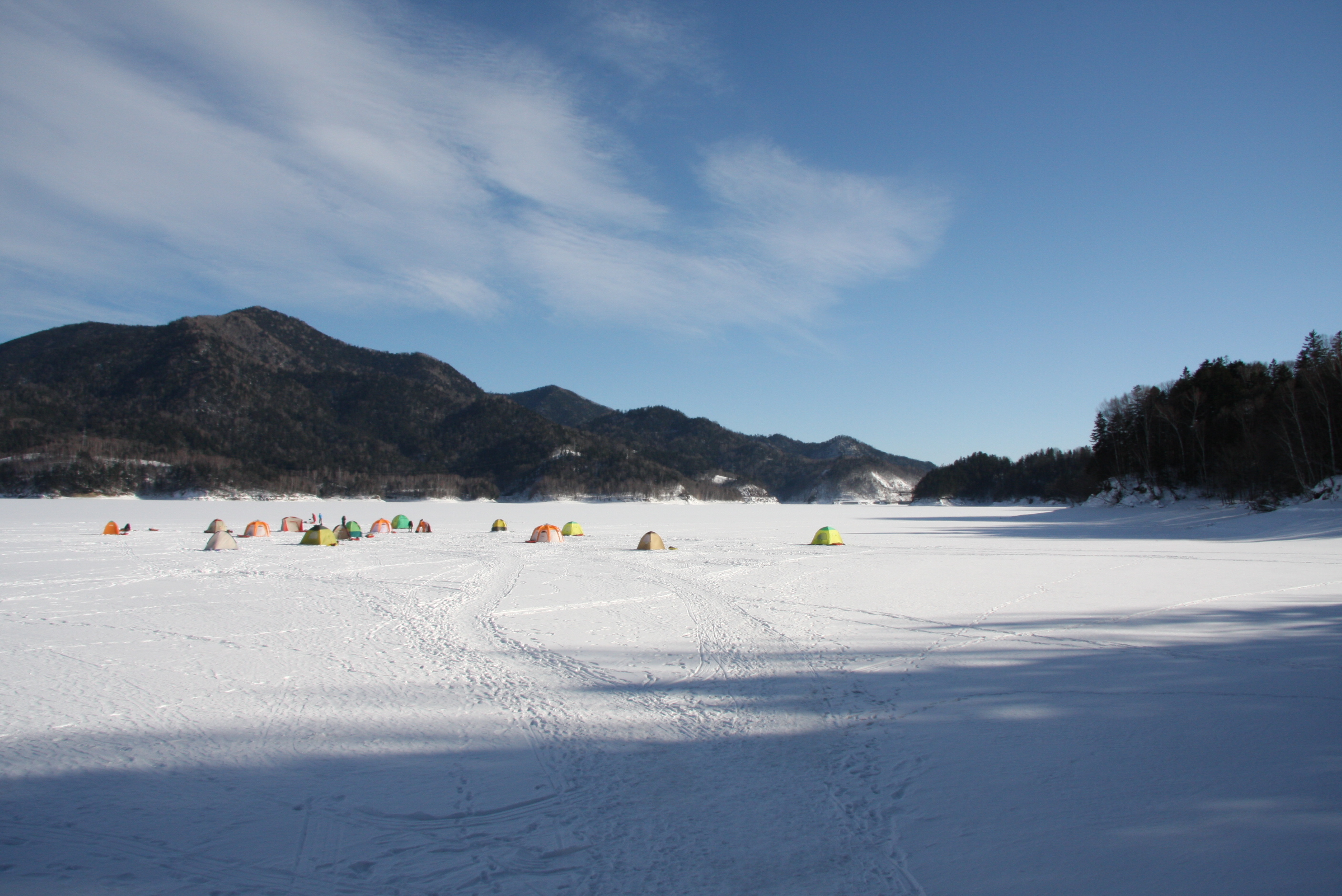
LakeNukabira in January

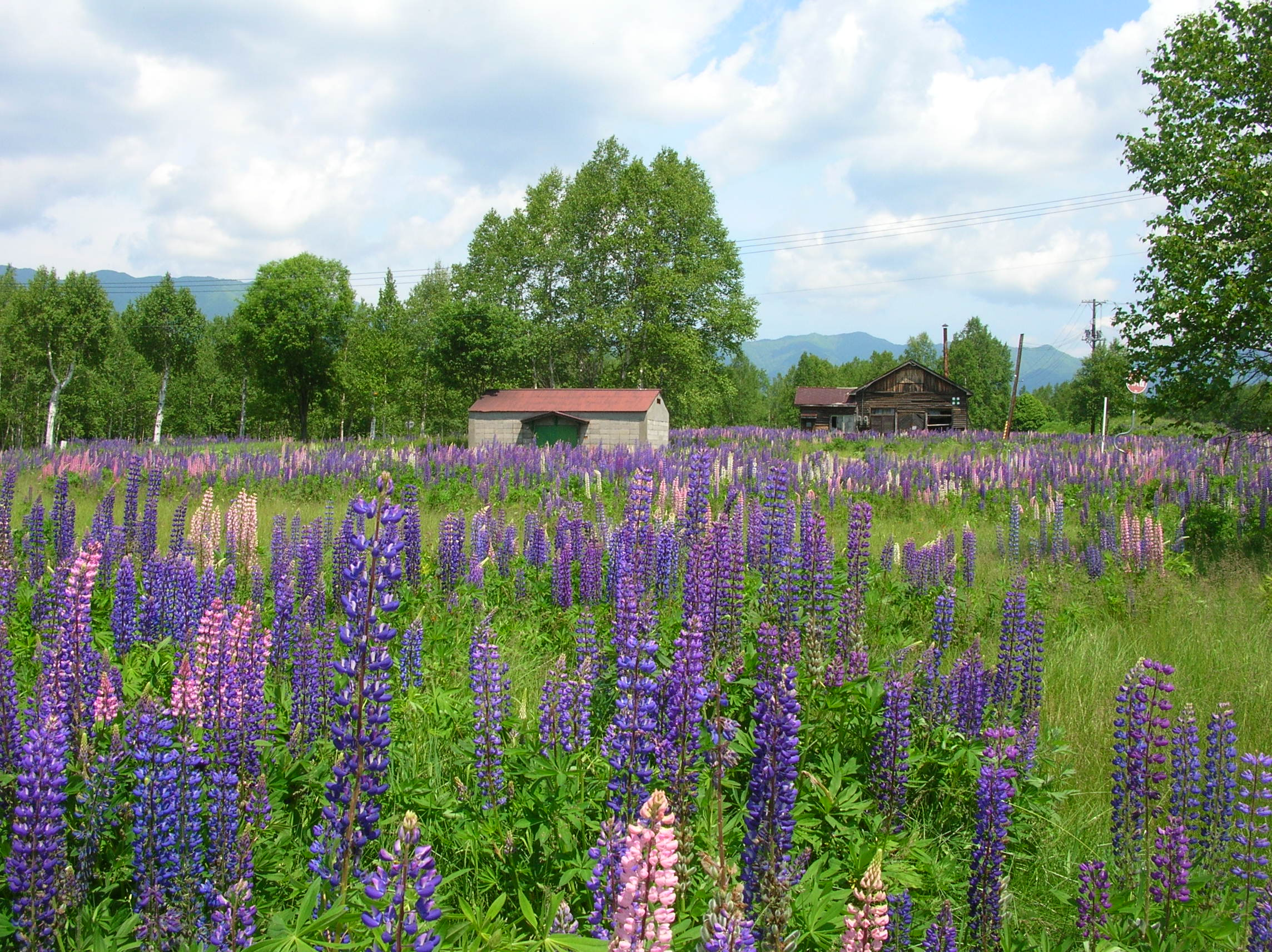
Kamishihoro Panorama

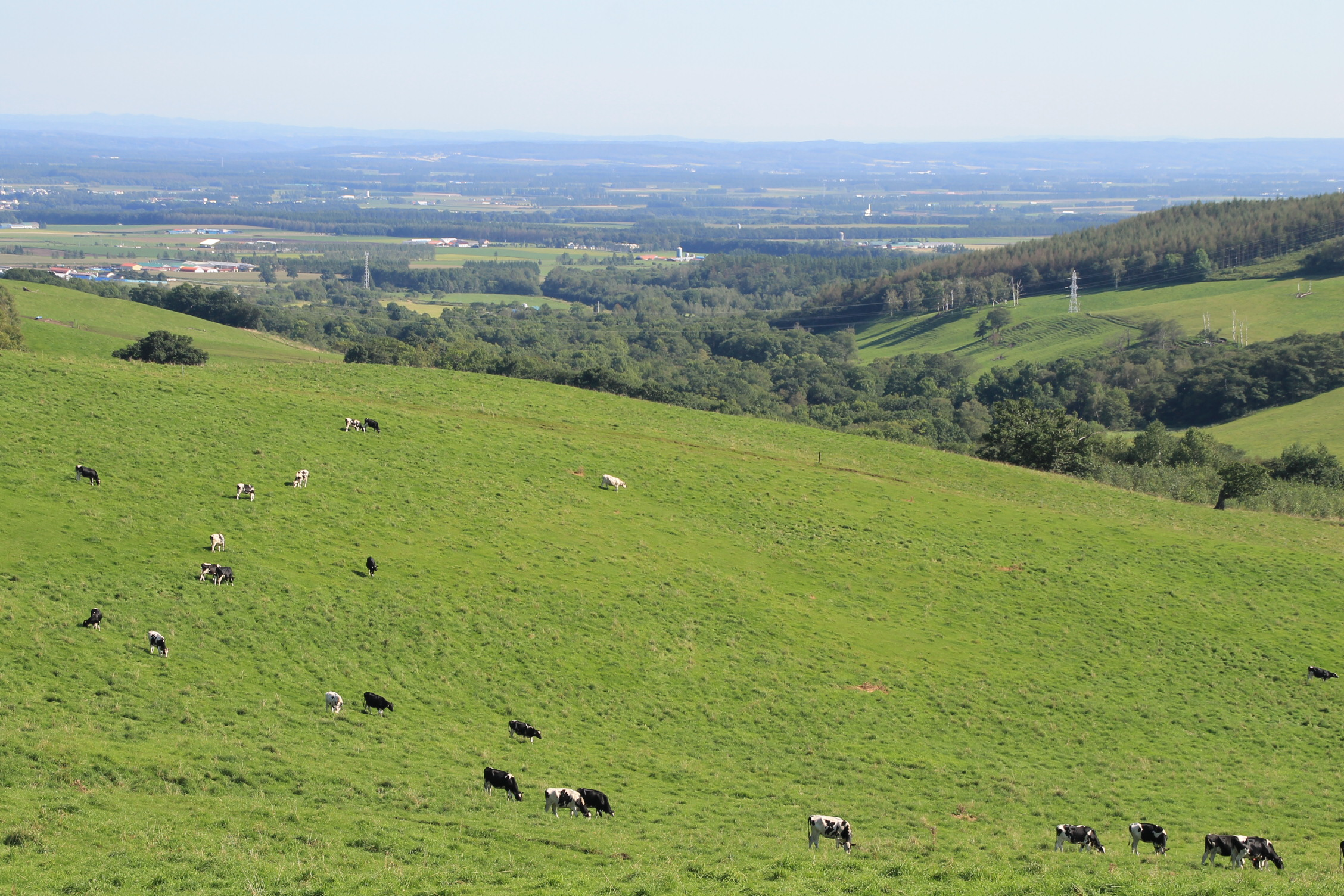
Kamishihoro Panorama

== Notable people from Kamishihoro ==
- Hanako Tokachi, actress

== Mascot ==
Horon-chan, the town's mascot

Kamishihoro's mascot is Horon-chan (ほろんちゃん). She is a shy hot-air balloon who can both walk on earth and fly in the sky. Because she is a fairy, she had to eat food (especially agricultural and livestock products from the town) that is washed by the waters from the Nukabira Gensenkyo onsen to grow into the size of a human. She was unveiled on 1 December 2008.
