= List of songs recorded by Chrisye =

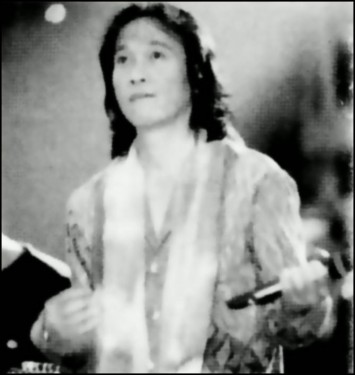
Chrisye performing live

During his 40-year career, the Indonesian pop singer Chrisye (1949–2007) recorded more than 200 songs as a vocalist, writing many of them by himself or in collaboration with others. In 2009 Rolling Stone Indonesia selected four of these ("Lilin-Lilin Kecil" at number 13, "Merpati Putih" at number 43, "Anak Jalanan" at number 72, and "Merepih Alam" at number 90) as among the best Indonesian songs of all time.

After starting his professional music career as a bass guitarist with the band Sabda Nada (later renamed Gipsy) in the late 1960s, Chrisye recorded his first vocals in 1976 on the album Guruh Gipsy, a collaboration between Gipsy and Guruh Sukarnoputra. The following year, he recorded "Lilin-Lilin Kecil" for the Prambors Radio Teenage Songwriting Competition (Lomba Cipta Lagu Remaja, or LCLR); the song, written by James F. Sundah, became his signature song. Beginning with Badai Pasti Berlalu (1977), Chrisye wrote some of his own songs; his first songwriting credit was "Merepih Alam".

After changing collaborators several times over his early solo albums, starting with Sabda Alam (1978), in 1983 Chrisye recorded a trilogy of albums for which Jockie Soerjoprajogo and Eros Djarot – with whom he had worked on Badai Pasti Berlalu – wrote or co-wrote most of the songs. After the trio disbanded in 1984, Chrisye produced another three albums with young songwriter Adjie Soetama. This collaboration was followed by two albums arranged by Younky Suwarno, in 1988 and 1989 and an EP in 1990. During the final twelve years of his career, Chrisye worked with several young artists, with arrangement generally handled by Erwin Gutawa.

Most of Chrisye's songs were original, and several, written by different persons, have the same title; the title with the most iterations is "Cinta Kita", which has three different tracks attached to it. Most were in Indonesian, although he recorded four songs in English and two in Balinese. Chrisye also covered several works by other writers, most prominently on his 2002 cover album – the only such album he made – Dekade, in which he covered eight Indonesian songs dating from the 1940s to 1990s. In other cases, his older hits were given new arrangements; Erwin Gutawa, who collaborated with Chrisye for a decade in the 1990s, did so to several of Chrisye's songs on AkustiChrisye (1996) and a new version of Badai Pasti Berlalu (1999). Chrisye was accused of plagiarism on two occasions: first in 1985 with "Hip Hip Hura" (said to plagiarise Kenny Loggins's 1984 song "Footloose"), then in 1988 with "Jumpa Pertama" (said to plagiarise Sheena Easton's 1980 song "9 to 5").

This list includes song titles and their literal English translations, if applicable; song titles that do not need translation but have a possibly unclear meaning have noted after the title. Unless otherwise noted, all songs are in Indonesian. Songs performed but not recorded are not listed.

== Released songs ==
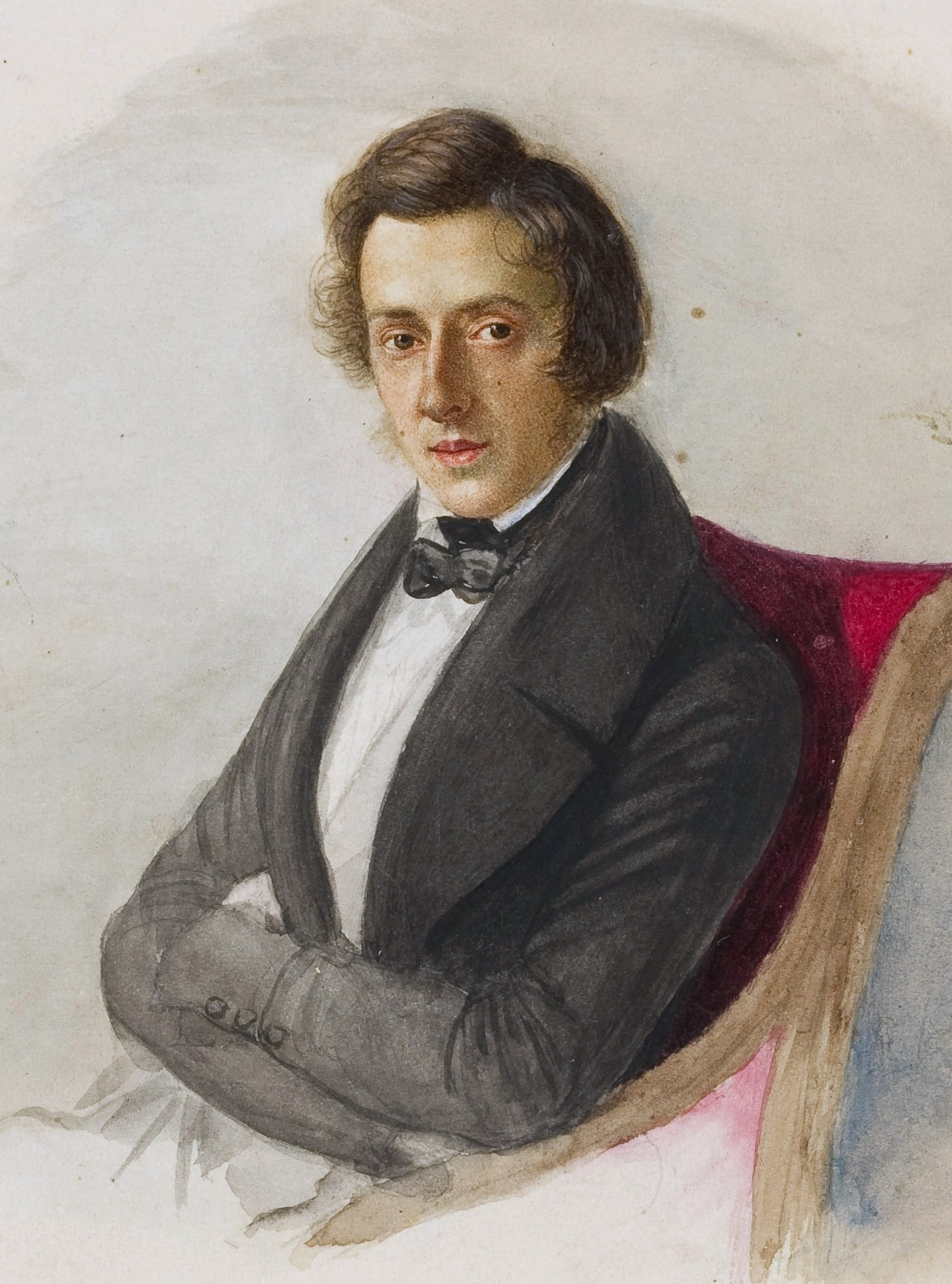
One of Chrisye's earliest recorded songs as a vocalist was "Chopin Larung", based on Frédéric Chopin's Fantaisie-Impromptu, in 1976.

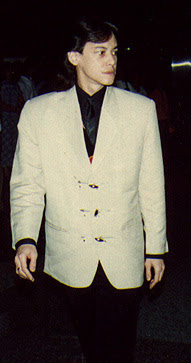
Fariz RM wrote several of Chrisye's earlier songs.

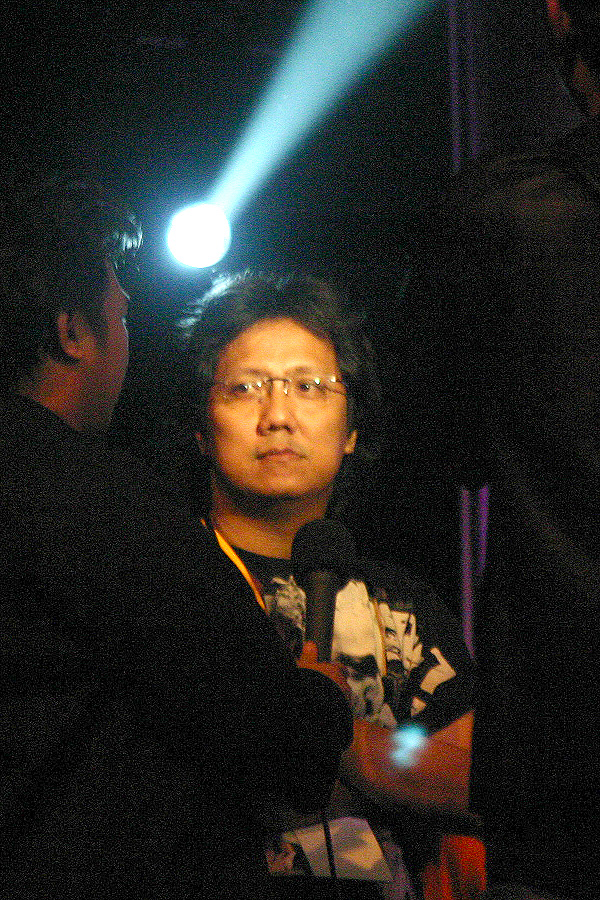
Erwin Gutawa spent more than a decade arranging songs for Chrisye, including a completely new arrangement of Badai Pasti Berlalu and several earlier songs.

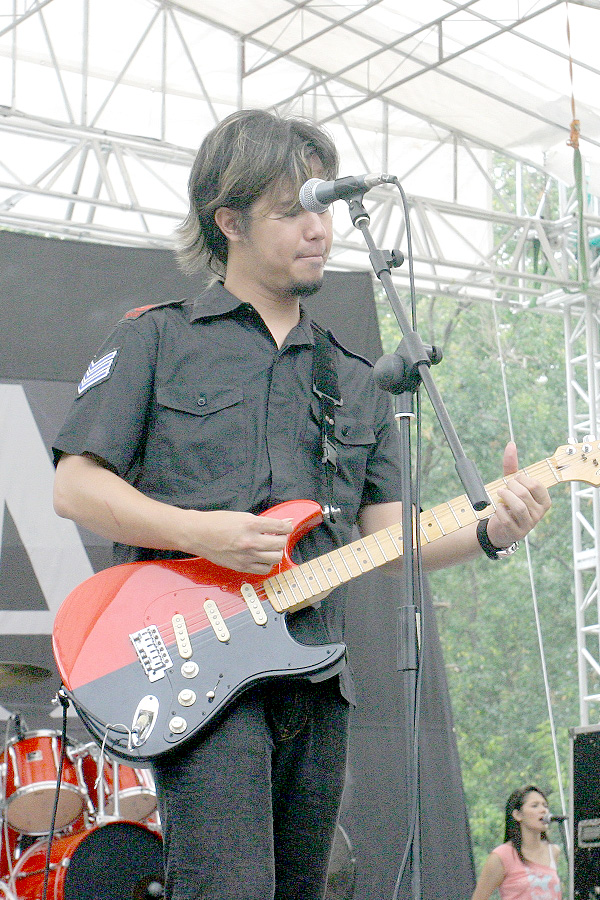
Ahmad Dhani wrote several of the songs that Chrisye sang; the two also sang a duet together.

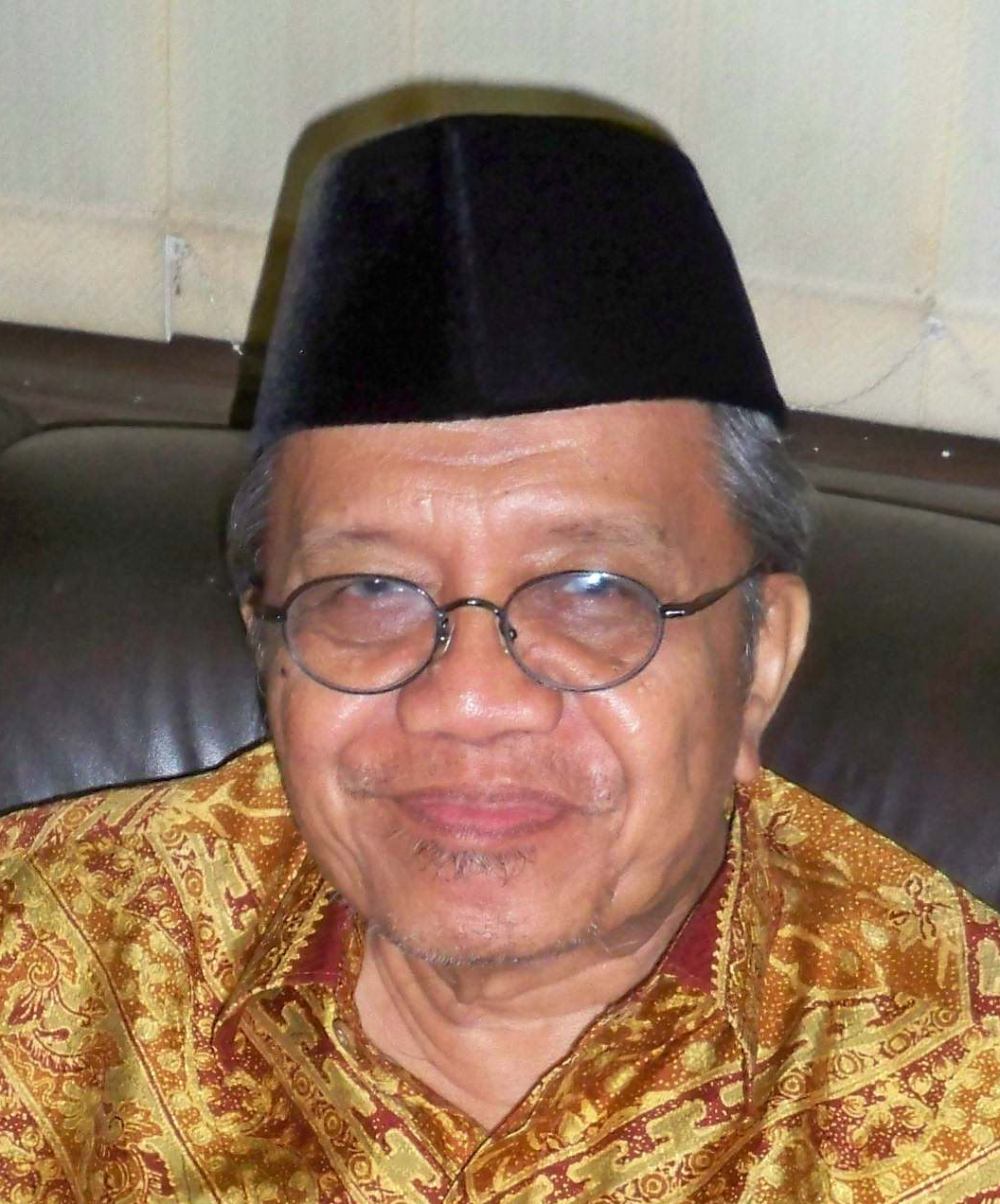
Taufiq Ismail helped Chrisye in writing "Ketika Tangan dan Kaki Berkata".

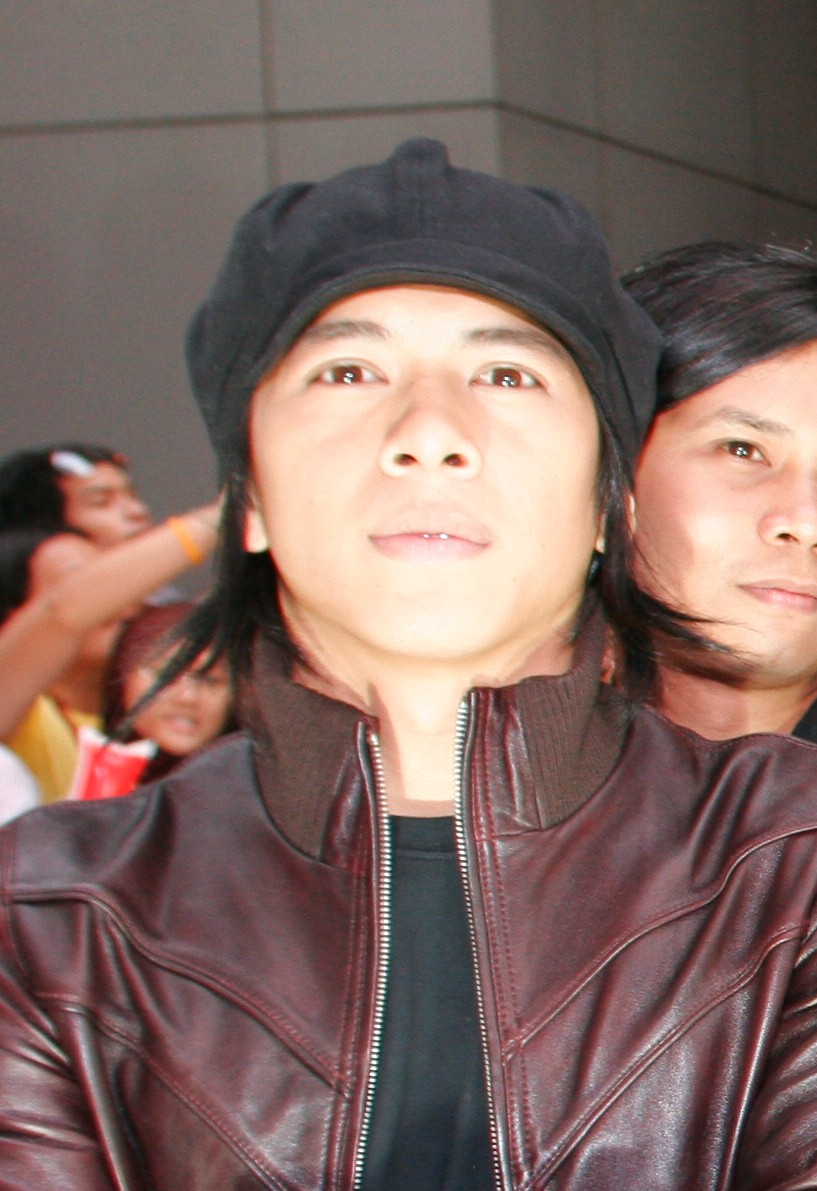
For Senyawa, Chrisye performed a duet with Ariel of Peterpan, titled "Menunggumu"

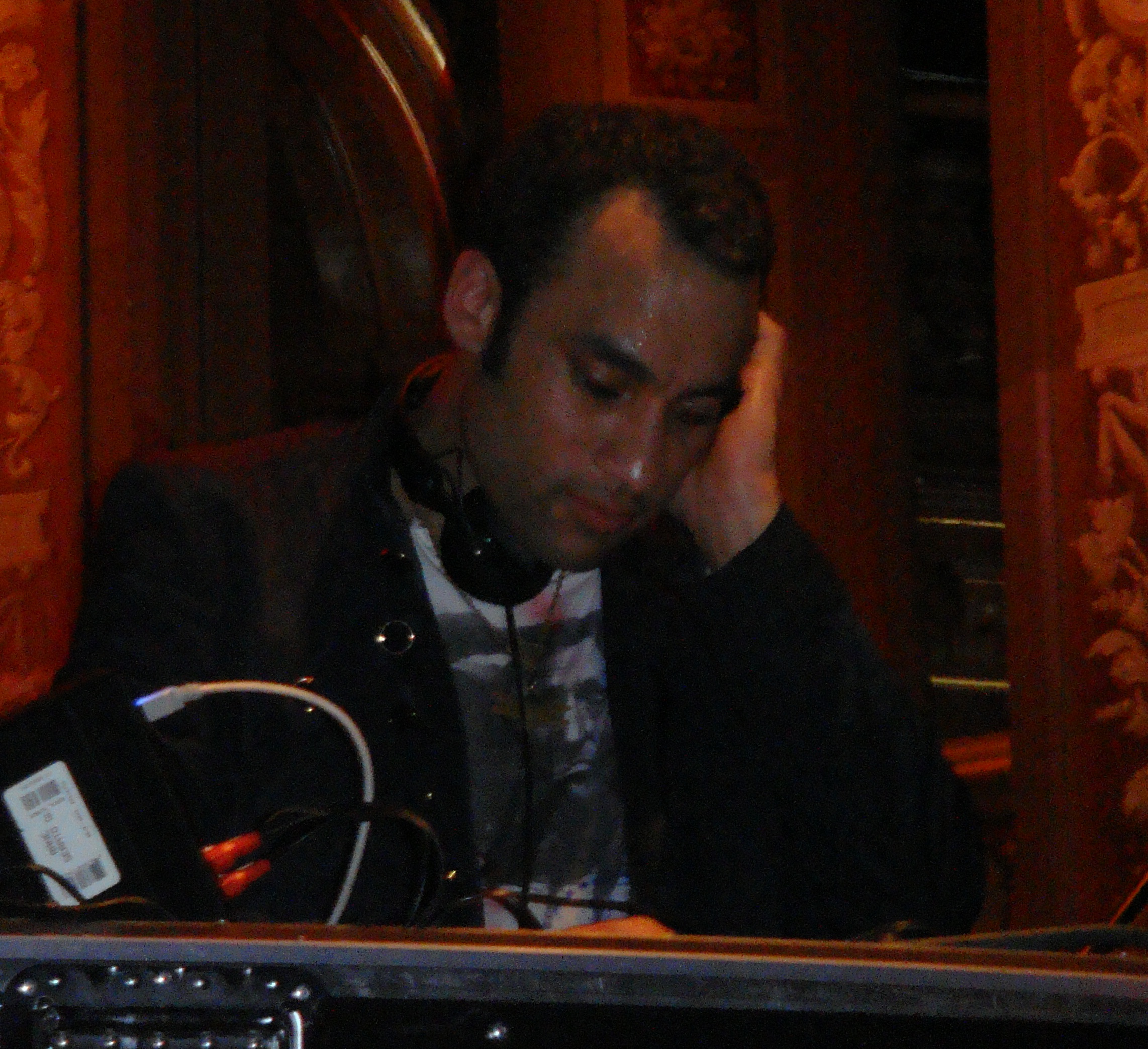
"Tears Never Dry" by Stephen Simmonds was adapted for "Jika Surga dan Neraka Tak Pernah Ada"; Simmonds received a songwriting credit.

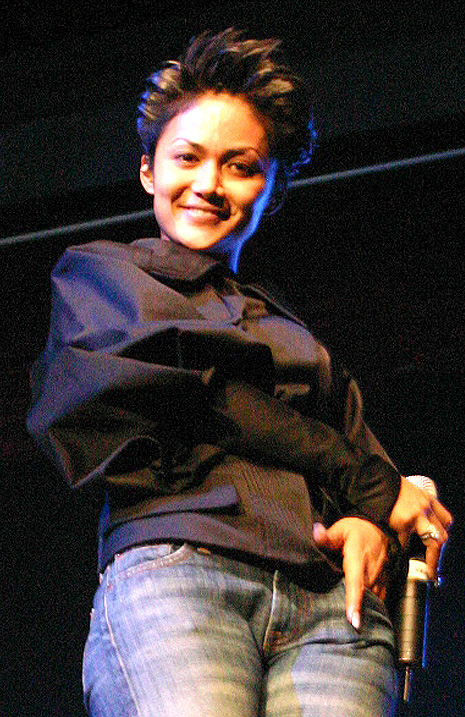
Krisdayanti was one of several artists who recorded "Asalkan Pilih Jalan Damai" with Chrisye for the 2004 presidential election.

Key
†	Indicates single release

Song	Other performer(s)	Writer(s)	Album	Year	Ref(s).
"Ada Cinta" ("There is Love")	–	Chrisye; Deddy Dhukun	Jumpa Pertama	1988	
"Adakah" ("Is There?")	–	Christ; Tommy	Sabda Alam	1978	
"Aku Cinta Dia"† ("I Love Her")	–	Adjie Soetama	Aku Cinta Dia	1985	
"Aku Cinta Golkar" ("I Love Golkar")	–	Adjie Soetama	Golkar Pilihanku!	1987	
"Aku Cinta Padamu" ("I Love You")	–	Chrisye; Adjie Soetama	Nona Lisa	1986	
"Aku dan Dia" ("She and I")	–	Eros Djarot; Chrisye	Sendiri	1984	
"Aku Suka" ("I Like It")	–	Cecep AS; Sam Bobo	AkustiChrisye	1996	
"Anak Jalanan" ("Street Children")	–	Guruh Sukarnoputra	Sabda Alam	1978	
"Anak Jalanan" (Note: New arrangement by Erwin Gutawa) ("Street Children")	–	Guruh Sukarnoputra	AkustiChrisye	1996	
"Anak Manusia" ("Child of Mankind")	–	Chrisye; Eros Djarot	Resesi	1983	
"Anak Sekolah"† ("Schoolgirl")	–	Oddie Agam	Nona Lisa	1986	
"Andai Aku Bisa"† ("If I Could")	–	Bebi Romeo; Ahmad Dhani	Konser Tur 2001	2001	
"Anggrek Bulan" ("Moon Orchid")	Sophia Latjuba	A. Riyanto	Dekade	2002	
"Angin Malam" ("Evening Breeze")	–	Keenan Nasution; Debby Nasution	Badai Pasti Berlalu (1977)	1977	
"Angin Malam" ("Evening Breeze")	–	Keenan Nasution; Debby Nasution	Badai Pasti Berlalu (1999)	1999	
"Angkuh"† ("Arrogant")	–	Jockie Soerjoprajogo; Tamy Lesapura	Percik Pesona	1979	
"Asalkan Pilih Jalan Damai"† ("As Long As You Choose the Road of Peace")	Krisdayanti, Aning Katamsi, Sherina Munaf, Oppie Andaresta, Cindy Claudia, and Acie Harahap	Aryono Huboyo Djati	Single only	2004	
"Badai Pasti Berlalu"† ("The Storm will Surely Pass")	–	Eros Djarot; Jockie Soerjoprajogo	Badai Pasti Berlalu (1999)	1999	
"Baju Pengantin" ("Wedding Dress")	–	Eros Djarot; Jockie Soerjoprajogo	Badai Pasti Berlalu (1977)	1977	
"Baju Pengantin" ("Wedding Dress")	–	Eros Djarot; Jockie Soerjoprajogo	Badai Pasti Berlalu (1999)	1999	
"Beku" ("Frozen")	Ricky FM	Ricky FM; Lusman	Senyawa	2004	
"Berita Ironi"† ("Ironic News")	–	Eros Djarot; Jockie Soerjoprajogo	Nona	1984	
"Biarkan Ku Sejenak" ("Let Me Be for a While")	–	Eros Djarot; Jockie Soerjoprajogo	Nona	1984	
"Bulan Namanya" ("Its Name is the Moon")	–	Adjie Soetama	Hip Hip Hura	1985	
"Bunda Tercinta" ("Beloved Mother")	–	Chrisye; Adjie Soetama	Aku Cinta Dia	1985	
"Bur-Kat"† ("Say It Quickly")	Project Pop	Yosi	Senyawa	2004	
"Cakrawala" ("Horizons")	–	Agus B.	Percik Pesona	1979	
"Cemburu" ("Jealous")	–	Eros Djarot; Chrisye	Sendiri	1984	
"Chopin Larung" (Note: Based on Fantaisie-Impromptu by Frédéric Chopin; in Balinese)† ("Floating Chopin")	–	Guruh Sukarnoputra; Frédéric Chopin	Guruh Gipsy	1976	
"Chopin Larung"† ("Floating Chopin")	–	Guruh Sukarnoputra; Frédéric Chopin	Guruh Gipsy	2003	
"Cinta Kita" ("Our Love")	–	Chrisye; Adjie Soetama	Aku Cinta Dia	1985	
"Cinta Kita" ("Our Love")	–	Doty; Dame	Pergilah Kasih	1989	
"Cinta Kita" ("Our Love")	–	Chrisye; Rina RD	Sendiri Lagi	1993	
"Cinta Yang Lain"† ("Another Love")	Pasha	Enda; Ungu	Senyawa	2004	
"Cintaku" ("My Love")	–	Eros Djarot; Jockie Soerjoprajogo	Badai Pasti Berlalu (1977)	1977	
"Cintaku"† ("My Love")	–	Eros Djarot; Jockie Soerjoprajogo	Badai Pasti Berlalu (1999)	1999	
"Cintamu T'lah Berlalu"† ("Your Love Has Passed")	–	Tonny Koeswoyo	Single only	1992	
"Cita Secinta" ("Longing for a Love")	–	Junaedi Salat; Jockie Soerjoprajogo; Chrisye	Sabda Alam	1978	
"Cita-Cita" ("Dreams")	–	Chrisye; Adjie Soetama	Aku Cinta Dia	1985	
"Citra Hitam" ("Black Image")	–	Junaedi Salat; Jockie Soerjoprajogo; Chrisye	Sabda Alam	1978	
"Damai Bersamamu"† ("Peace with You")	–	Johny Sahilatua	AkustiChrisye	1996	
"Damba di Dada" ("Yearning in My Chest")	–	Chrisye; Junaedi Salat	Percik Pesona	1979	
"Dara Manisku"† ("My Sweet Maiden")	–	Tonny Koeswoyo	Dekade	2002	
"Datanglah" ("Come")	–	Adjie Soetama	Aku Cinta Dia	1985	
"Dekadensi" ("Decadence")	–	Eros Djarot; Chrisye	Sendiri	1984	
"Dendam" ("Vengeance")	–	Jockie Soerjoprajogo	Jurang Pemisah	1977	
"Desah Kalbu" ("Soul's Sigh")	–	Jockie Soerjoprajogo	Pantulan Cita	1981	
"Dewi Khayal"† ("Goddess of Fantasy")	–	Jockie Soerjoprajogo; Fariz RM	Percik Pesona	1979	
"Dewi Mayang" ("The Goddess Mayang")	–	Chrisye	Seindah Rembulan	1980	
"Di Batas Akhir Senja" ("At the Boundary of Dusk")	–	Jockie Soerjoprajogo; Eros Djarot	Resesi	1983	
"Di Bawah Sinar Bulan Purnama" ("Under the Light of the Full Moon")	–	Maladi	Dekade	2002	
"Di Mana" ("Where")	–	Chrisye; Lulu Gutawa	AkustiChrisye	1996	
"Dia" ("Her")	–	Jockie Soerjoprajogo; Theodore KS	Jurang Pemisah	1977	
"Dirimu dan Diriku" ("You and I")	–	Agus B.	Percik Pesona	1979	
"Doa Anak Negeri" ("Prayer of the Son of the Nation")	–	Donny Hardono; Prass	Lomba Cipta Lagu Pembangunan	1987	
"Duka Sang Bahaduri" ("The Nobleman's Sorrow")	–	Junaedi Salat; Jockie Soerjoprajogo	Sabda Alam	1978	
"Gadis Manja" ("Spoiled Girl")	Hetty Koes Endang	Eros Djarot	Nona	1984	
"Galih dan Ratna"† ("Galih and Ratna")	–	Guruh Sukarnoputra	Puspa Indah	1980	
"Gelap kan Sirna" ("The Darkness Will Disappear")	–	Tohpati; Elena Zachnas	Kala Cinta Menggoda	1997	
"Gita Cinta"† ("Love Song")	–	Eddy S. Iskandar; Guruh Sukarnoputra	Puspa Indah	1980	
"Goodbye My Love" (Note: Translated from "Selamat Tinggal Sayang" for English Program on TVRI)	–	Dadang S Manaf; Imam RN; Tya	Listen to Hits	1985	
"Hari Bahagia" ("Happy Day")	–	Chrisye; Dadang S. Munaf	Jumpa Pertama	1988	
"Hari-Hariku" ("My Days")	–	Chrisye; Pamungkas Narashima Murti	Pergilah Kasih	1989	
"Haruskah" ("Is It Necessary")	–	Dian Pramana Poetra	Sendiri Lagi	1993	
"Hatimu & Hatiku" ("Your Heart & My Heart")	–	Eros Djarot; Chrisye	Sendiri	1984	
"Hening" ("Tranquil")	–	Jockie Soerjoprajogo	Pantulan Cita	1981	
"Hening"† ("Tranquil")	–	Chrisye; Jockie Soerjoprajogo; Eros Djarot	Resesi	1983	
"Hening" ("Tranquil")	Rafika Duri and Trio Libels	Chrisye; Jockie Soerjoprajogo; Eros Djarot	Single only	1990	
"Hidupku Untuk Cinta" ("My Life For Love")	–	–	From Us to U	2005	
"Hilangnya Sebuah Pribadi" ("Loss of a Person")	–	Eros Djarot	Nona	1984	
"Hip Hip Hura"† ("Hip Hip Hurray")	–	Adjie Soetama	Hip Hip Hura	1985	
"Huru Hara" ("Riot")	–	Chrisye; Adjie Soetama	Nona Lisa	1986	
"Hura Hura" ("Rah Rah")	–	Chrisye; Adjie Soetama	Aku Cinta Dia	1985	
"Hura Hura II" ("Rah Rah II")	–	Chrisye; Adjie Soetama	Hip Hip Hura	1985	
"I Love Her" (Note: Translated from "Aku Cinta Dia" for English Program on TVRI)	–	Adjie Soetama; Tya	Listen to Hits	1985	
"Indahnya Alam" ("The Beauty of Nature")	–	Agus B.	Percik Pesona	1979	
"Interlude – Kenang-Kenangan" ("Interlude – Memories")	–	Jockie Soerjoprajogo; Guruh Sukarnoputra	Puspa Indah	1980	
"Januari Yang Indah" ("Beautiful January")	–	Ryan Kyoto	Sendiri Lagi	1993	
"Jeritan Seberang"† ("Shriek from the Other Side")	–	James F. Sundah	Jurang Pemisah	1977	
"Jika Surga dan Neraka Tak Pernah Ada"† ("If Heaven and Hell Never Existed")	Ahmad Dhani	Stephen Simmonds; Ahmad Dhani	Senyawa	2004	
"Juli" (Note: A girl's name in Indonesia)	–	Dian Pramana Poetra; Deddy Dhukun	Hip Hip Hura	1985	
"Jumpa Pertama" ("First Meeting")	–	Andi Mapajalos	Jumpa Pertama	1988	
"Jurang Pemisah"† ("Dividing Canyon")	–	Jockie Soerjoprajogo; James F. Sundah	Jurang Pemisah	1977	
"Juwita"† ("Beautiful")	–	Junaedi Salat; Jockie Soerjoprajogo; Chrisye	Sabda Alam	1978	
"Juwita" ("Beautiful")	–	Jockie Soerjoprajogo; Eros Djarot	Resesi	1983	
"Kala Cinta Menggoda"† ("When Love Tempts")	–	Guruh Sukarnoputra	Kala Cinta Menggoda	1997	
"Kala Mega Kian Mendung" ("When The Sky Became Cloudier")	–	Harry Sabar	Pantulan Cita	1981	
"Kala Sang Surya Tenggelam" ("When the Sun Set")	–	Guruh Sukarnoputra	Sabda Alam	1978	
"Kala Sang Surya Tenggelam" ("When the Sun Set")	–	Guruh Sukarnoputra	AkustiChrisye	1996	
"Kalimantan" (Note: The Indonesian portion of Borneo)	–	Guruh Sukarnoputra	Kala Cinta Menggoda	1997	
"Kan Berlalu" ("Will Pass")	–	Base Jam	Kala Cinta Menggoda	1997	
"Kangen"† ("Longing")	Sophia Latjuba	Ahmad Dhani	Dekade	2002	
"Kau dan Aku" ("You and I")	–	Chrisye	Hip Hip Hura	1985	
"Kau Ternyata" ("So You...")	–	Chrisye; Deddy Dhukun	Jumpa Pertama	1988	
"Kehadiran" ("Presence")	–	Eros Djarot	Metropolitan	1983	
"Kehidupanku" ("My Life")	–	Fariz RM; Junaedi Salat	Percik Pesona	1979	
"Kembalilah" ("Return")	–	Tito Soemarsono	Kala Cinta Menggoda	1997	
"Kembang Goyang" ("Bouncing Flowers")	–	Guruh Sukarnoputra	Nona Lisa	1986	
"Kemesraan"† ("Intimacy")	Iwan Fals, Rafika Duri, and Bertharia Sonata	Franky S. Johnny S.	Single only	1988	
"Kenang-Kenangan" ("Memories")	–	Guruh Sukarnoputra	Puspa Indah	1980	
"Kenangan Biru" ("Blue Memories")	–	Jockie Soerjoprajogo; Guruh Sukarnoputra	Percik Pesona	1979	
"Kenangan Remaja" ("Teenage Memories")	–	Eros Djarot	Metropolitan	1983	
"Kencana" ("Gold")	–	Jockie Soerjoprajogo	Pantulan Cita	1981	
"Kesan di Matamu" ("Impression in Your Eyes")	–	Chossy Pratama	AkustiChrisye	1996	
"Ketika Tangan dan Kaki Berkata"† ("When Hands and Feet Speak")	–	Taufiq Ismail; Chrisye	Kala Cinta Menggoda	1997	
"Khayalku" ("My Imagination")	Berlian Hutauruk	Keenan Nasution; Debby Nasution	Badai Pasti Berlalu (1977)	1977	
"Khayalku" ("My Imagination")	Nicky Astria	Keenan Nasution; Debby Nasution	Badai Pasti Berlalu (1999)	1999	
"Kidung"† ("Ballad")	Rafika Duri and Trio Libels	Chris Manusama	Single only	1990	
"Kisah Cintaku"† ("Story of My Love")	Atiek CB	Tito Soemarsono	Jumpa Pertama	1988	
"Kisah Insani"† ("Human Story")	–	Eros Djarot; Iman Rn. Chrisye	Sendiri	1984	
"Kisah Kasih di Sekolah"† ("A School Love Story")	–	Obbie Messakh	Dekade	2002	
"Kr. Pasar Gambir dan Stambul Anak Jampang" ("Kroncong of Gambir Market and Stambul of the Cowlicked Child")	–	Ismail Marzuki	Dekade	2002	
"Kutahu" ("I Know")	–	Tito Soemarsono	Jumpa Pertama	1988	
"Lagi Lagi" ("Again and Again")	–	Eros Djarot	Metropolitan	1983	
"Lagu Putih" ("White Song")	–	Guruh Sukarnoputra	Puspa Indah	1980	
"Lagu Untukmu" ("Song For You")	–	Eros Djarot	Nona	1984	
"Lakon Manusia" ("Human Story")	–	Guruh Sukarnoputra	Puspa Indah	1980	
"Lenny"†	–	Chrisye; Eros Djarot	Resesi	1983	
"Lenny"	–	Chrisye; Adjie Soetama	Nona Lisa	1986	
"Lestariku"† ("My Eternity")	–	Junaedi Salat	Percik Pesona	1979	
"Lestariku"† ("My Eternity")	Vina Panduwinata	Junaedi Salat; Chrisye	Sendiri	1984	
"Lilin-Lilin Kecil"† ("Small Candles")	–	James F. Sundah	Lomba Cipta Lagu Remaja 1977	1977	
"Lirih"† ("Gentle Voice")	–	Aryono Huboyo Djati	Single only	2008 (Note: Released posthumously)	
"Luna Kelam" ("Dark Moon")	–	Eross Chandra; Andi Rianto	Senyawa	2004	
"Maafkan" ("Forgive")	–	Wacha H.	Nona Lisa	1986	
"Maafkanlah" ("Forgive")	–	Chrisye; Adjie Soetama	Hip Hip Hura	1985	
"Maafkanlah" ("Forgive")	–	Tito Soemarsono; Yuke NS.	Pergilah Kasih	1989	
"Malam Pertama"† ("Wedding Night")	–	Jockie Soerjoprajogo; Eros Djarot	Resesi	1983	
"Malu" ("Embarrassed")	–	Eros Djarot; Chrisye	Sendiri	1984	
"Marilah Kemari" ("Hey Come Here")	Iwan Fals, Kahitna, Naif, Peterpan, Project Pop, Rossa, Seurieus Band, and Ungu	–	From Us to U	2005	
"Marlina"	–	Guruh Sukarnoputra	Puspa Indah	1980	
"Masa Kecil" ("Childhood")	–	Chrisye; Rina RD	Sendiri Lagi	1993	
"Masa Remaja" ("Teenage Years")	–	Chrisye; Adjie Soetama	Aku Cinta Dia	1985	
"Matahari" ("Sun")	–	Eros Djarot; Jockie Soerjoprajogo	Badai Pasti Berlalu (1999)	1999	
"Mawar Merah" ("Red Rose")	–	Budi Bidhun	Kala Cinta Menggoda	1997	
"Memori Kita" ("Our Memories")	–	Dadang S. Manaf	Sendiri Lagi	1993	
"Menunggumu"† ("Waiting For You")	Ariel	Ariel; Peterpan	Senyawa	2004	
"Merdeka Menari" ("Free and Dancing")	–	Guruh Sukarnoputra	Aku Cinta Dia	1985	
"Merepih Alam"† ("Fragile Nature")	–	Eros Djarot; Chrisye	Badai Pasti Berlalu (1977)	1977	
"Merepih Alam" ("Fragile Nature")	–	Eros Djarot; Chrisye	Badai Pasti Berlalu (1999)	1999	
"Merpati Putih"† ("White Dove")	–	Eros Djarot; Jockie Soerjoprajogo	Badai Pasti Berlalu (1977)	1977	
"Merpati Putih" ("White Dove")	–	Eros Djarot; Jockie Soerjoprajogo	Badai Pasti Berlalu (1999)	1999	
"Mesin Kota" ("Machines in the City")	–	Jockie Soerjoprajogo; James F. Sundah	Jurang Pemisah	1977	
"Metropolitan"	–	Eros Djarot	Metropolitan	1983	
"Money"	–	Jockie Soerjoprajogo; Eros Djarot	Resesi	1983	
"Mungkinkah" ("Is It Possible")	–	Chrisye; Tito Soemarsono	Jumpa Pertama	1988	
"Nada Asmara" ("Tones of Passion")	–	Jockie Soerjoprajogo; Junaedi Salat	Sabda Alam	1978	
"Natalie"	–	Eros Djarot	Metropolitan	1983	
"Negeriku" ("My Country")	–	Chrisye; Rina RD; Yanti Noer	Kala Cinta Menggoda	1997	
"Night Out" (Note: Translated from "Hura Hura" for English Program on TVRI)	–	Adjie Soetama; Tya	Listen to Hits	1985	
"Nona"† ("Miss")	–	Eros Djarot; Jockie Soerjoprajogo	Nona	1984	
"Nona Lisa"† ("Miss Lisa")	–	Tito Soemarsono; Deddy Dhukun; Chrisye	Nona Lisa	1986	
"Nostalgia Cinta" ("Love's Nostalgia")	–	Chrisye; Rina RD	Pergilah Kasih	1989	
"Nyanyian Rindu" ("Singing of Longing")	–	Chrisye	Aku Cinta Dia	1985	
"Oh Cintaku" ("O My Love")	–	Tito Soemarsono	Sendiri Lagi	1993	
"Pagi" ("Morning")	–	Chrisye; Adjie Soetama	AkustiChrisye	1996	
"Panah Asmarah" ("Love's Arrow")	–	Tohpati	Senyawa	2004	
"Pantulan Cita" ("Reflection of Dreams")	–	Harry Sabar; Chrisye	Pantulan Cita	1981	
"Pelangi" ("Rainbow")	–	Eros Djarot; Jockie Soerjoprajogo	Badai Pasti Berlalu (1977)	1977	
"Pelangi"† ("Rainbow")	–	Eros Djarot; Jockie Soerjoprajogo	Badai Pasti Berlalu (1999)	1999	
"Pemuda" ("Adolescent")	–	Chrisye	Hip Hip Hura	1985	
"Pengakuan" ("Confession")	–	Eros Djarot	Metropolitan	1983	
"Pengalaman Pertama"† ("First Experience")	–	A. Rafiq	Dekade	2002	
"Percik Pesona" ("Stain of Enchantment")	–	Jockie Soerjoprajogo; Fariz RM	Percik Pesona	1979	
"Pergilah Kasih"† ("Go Away Dear")	–	Tito Soemarsono	Pergilah Kasih	1989	
"Pergilah Kasih" (Note: Extended version, featuring an extra minute of instrumentals) ("Go Away Dear")	–	Tito Soemarsono	Pergilah Kasih	1989	
"Pergilah Kekasih" ("Go Away Dear")	–	Yudis; Ntl	Sendiri Lagi	1993	
"Perkasa Manusia" ("Mankind's Strength")	–	Jockie Soerjoprajogo	Pantulan Cita	1981	
"Polusi Udara" ("Air Pollution")	–	Jockie Soerjoprajogo	Resesi	1983	
"Puspa Indah" ("Beautiful Flower")	–	Guruh Sukarnoputra	Puspa Indah	1980	
"Putri" ("Princess")	–	Chrisye; B.J. Rianto	Pergilah Kasih	1989	
"Putri Ayu" ("Beautiful Girl")	–	Jockie Soerjoprajogo	Pantulan Cita	1981	
"Problema" ("Problem")	–	Chrisye; Rina RD	Pergilah Kasih	1989	
"Putri Malam" ("Daughters of the Night")	–	Jockie Soerjoprajogo; Temmy Lesanpura	Jurang Pemisah	1977	
"Resesi"† ("Recession")	–	Chrisye; Eros Djarot; Jockie Soerjoprajogo	Resesi	1983	
"Rindu" ("Longing")	–	Chrisye; Adjie Soetama	Hip Hip Hura	1985	
"Rindu Ini" ('Longing")	–	Tito Soemarsono and Chrisye	non-album single recorded in 1995 and released in September 2020	1995	
"Romeo & Julia 83"	–	Eros Djarot	Metropolitan	1983	
"Saat Yang Indah" ("A Beautiful Moment")	–	Dadang S. Manaf	Nona Lisa	1986	
"Sabda Alam"† ("Nature's Order")	–	Junaedi Salat; Chrisye	Sabda Alam	1978	
"Sahabat" ("Friend")	–	Chrisye; Rina RD	Kala Cinta Menggoda	1997	
"Sakura Dalam Pelukan" ("Sakura Held Tight")	–	Fariz RM	Dekade	2002	
"Salam Hangat" ("Warm Greetings")	–	Eros Djarot; Jockie Soerjoprajogo	Nona	1984	
"Sana Sini" ("Here and There")	–	Chrisye; Adjie Soetama	Hip Hip Hura	1985	
"Sarjana Kaki Lima"† ("Street Vender with a Degree")	–	Eros Djarot	Nona	1984	
"Satu Cinta" ("One Love")	–	Oddie Agam	Nona Lisa	1986	
"Sayang"† ("Dear")	Hetty Koes Endang	Eros Djarot; Jockie Soerjoprajogo	Nona	1984	
"Seindah Rembulan" ("As Beautiful as the Moon")	Iis Sugianto	Rinto Harahap	Seindah Rembulan	1980	
"Selamat Bahagia Kasih" ("Have Fun Dear")	–	Dadang S. Munaf	Jumpa Pertama	1988	
"Selamat Datang Anakku" ("Welcome My Child")	–	Eros Djarot	Nona	1984	
"Selamat Jalan Kekasih"† ("Farewell Dear")	–	Eros Djarot	Metropolitan	1983	
"Selamat Tinggal Sayang" ("Goodbye Dear")	–	Dadang S Manaf; Imam RN	Aku Cinta Dia	1985	
"Semua Sudah Lain" ("Everything's Different")	–	Billy B. Acha Haiz	Sendiri Lagi	1993	
"Semusim" ("One Season")	Berlian Hutauruk	Keenan Nasution; Debby Nasution	Badai Pasti Berlalu (1977)	1977	
"Semusim" ("One Season")	Waljinah	Keenan Nasution; Debby Nasution	Badai Pasti Berlalu (1999)	1999	
"Sendiri"† ("Alone")	–	Guruh Sukarnoputra	Sendiri	1984	
"Sendiri Lagi"† ("Alone Again")	–	Ryan Kyoto	Sendiri Lagi	1993	
"Seni"† ("Art")	–	Chrisye; Guruh Soekarno Putra	Pagelaran Guruh Soekarno Putra : Cinta Indonesia	1983	
"Sentuhan Cinta" ("Love's Touch")	–	Jockie Soerjoprajogo; Eros Djarot	Resesi	1983	
"Sentuhanmu" ("Your Touch")	–	Jerry; Jockie Soerjoprajogo; Harry Sabar	Pantulan Cita	1981	
"Seperti Dulu" ("Like Before")	–	Mira Lesmana	Sendiri Lagi	1993	
"Seperti Yang Kau Minta"† ("As You Wish")	–	Pongky	Dekade	2002	
"Serasa" ("Feels Like")	–	Eros Djarot; Chrisye	Badai Pasti Berlalu (1977)	1977	
"Serasa" ("Feels Like")	–	Eros Djarot; Chrisye	Badai Pasti Berlalu (1999)	1999	
"Setia"† ("Faithful")	–	Guruh Sukarnoputra	Konser Tur 2001	2001	
"Sirna" ("Disappear")	–	Jockie Soerjoprajogo	Jurang Pemisah	1977	
"Sirna" ("Disappear")	–	Guruh Sukarnoputra	Puspa Indah	1980	
"Smaradhana" ("Passion")	–	Guruh Sukarnoputra	Guruh Gipsy	1976	
"Smaradhana" ("Passion")	–	Guruh Sukarnoputra	Sabda Alam	1978	
"Smaradhana" ("Passion")	–	Guruh Sukarnoputra	AkustiChrisye	1996	
"Suatu Persembahan Cinta" ("A Tribute to Love")	Ferdy T and Lucky	Ferdy T El Em Ent	Senyawa	2004	
"Suratmu" ("Your Letter")	–	Eros Djarot	Metropolitan	1983	
"Swara Hati" ("Heart's Voice")	–	Chrisye; Tommy Mario	Pergilah Kasih	1989	
"Terima Kasih" ("Thank You")	–	Adjie Soetama	Hip Hip Hura	1985	
"Terpendam" ("Pent Up")	–	Bagoes Aa	Nona Lisa	1986	
"Terus Berlari" ("Always Running")	–	Dadang S. Munaf	Jumpa Pertama	1988	
"Tiada Lagi Duka" ("No Longer Any Grief")	–	Chrisye; Adjie Soetama	Aku Cinta Dia	1985	
"Tjah Ayoe" ("Beautiful Face")	David	Pepeng; David; Jarwo; Emil; Naif	Senyawa	2004	
"To My Friends on Legian Beach" (Note: In English)	–	Sitor Situmorang; Guruh Sukarnoputra	Puspa Indah	1980	
"Tobat" ("Repentance")	–	Dodo Zakaria	Hip Hip Hura	1985	
"Tragedi" ("Tragedy")	–	Jerry; Jockie Soerjoprajogo	Pantulan Cita	1981	
"Tragedi Badai" ("Tragedy of the Storm")	–	Jerry; Jockie Soerjoprajogo	Pantulan Cita	1981	
"Untukku"† ("For Me")	–	Yovie Widianto	Kala Cinta Menggoda	1997	
"Wanita" ("Women")	–	Eros Djarot; Chrisye	Sendiri	1984	
"Windy"	–	Eros Djarot; Razi Noor	Sendiri	1984	
"Zamrud Khatulistiwa" ("Emerald on the Equator")	–	Guruh Sukarnoputra	AkustiChrisye	1996	
