= Konser Tur 2001 =

Studio album by Chrisye
- Released: 2 June 2001
- Recorded: 1978–2001
- Genre: Pop
- Length: 71:36
- Label: Musica Studios
- Producer: Erwin Gutawa

Chrisye chronology
Badai Pasti Berlalu (1999)	Konser Tur 2001 (2001)	Dekade (2002)

Konser Tur 2001 ([ˈkɔnsɛr ˈtʊr ˈdua ˈribu ˈsatu]; English: 2001 Concert Tour) is an eighteenth studio album by the Indonesian singer, Chrisye, released on 2 June 2001 by Musica Studios. Although the album is titled Konser Tur 2001, it was not recorded live; the title "Konser Tur" was chosen to coincide with Chrisye's tour in 2001. It included two new songs and reissues of some of his popular songs. The music video for one of the two new songs, "Setia" (English: Faithful) became controversial for its depiction of a woman dancing in tight clothing.

== Background and recording ==
Konser Tur 2001 was recorded to coincide with Chrisye's 2001 concert tour from 28 April to 22 May. Although it was named Konser Tur 2001, it is not a live recording of a concert; it is a studio album with two original songs and thirteen of his earlier hits, from Sabda Alam to Kala Cinta Menggoda. Chrisye stated that it was meant for his fans, in order for them to revisit his old songs.

== Track listing ==
No.	Title	Writer(s)	Original album	Length
1.	"Setia" ("Faithful")	Guruh Sukarnoputra	N/A	5:32
2.	"Andai Aku Bisa" ("If I Could")	Bebi Romeo and Ahmad Dhani	N/A	4:39
3.	"Serasa" ("It Feels Like")	Eros Djarot and Chrisye	Badai Pasti Berlalu	6:25
4.	"Kala Sang Surya Tenggelam" ("When the Sun Set")	Guruh Sukarnoputra	Sabda Alam	4:48
5.	"Kala Cinta Menggoda" ("When Love Tempts")	Guruh Sukarnoputra	Kala Cinta Menggoda	5:28
6.	"Pergilah Kasih" ("Go, My Dear")	Tito Soemarsono	Pergilah Kasih	4:46
7.	"Hura-Hura" ("Not Serious")	Chrisye and Adji Soetama	Aku Cinta Dia	4:08
8.	"Kisah Cintaku" ("My Love Story")	Tito Soemarsono	Jumpa Pertama	4:20
9.	"Anak Sekolah" ("Schoolgirl")	Odie Agam and Chrisye	Nona Lisa	4:01
10.	"Malam Pertama" ("Wedding Night")	Jockie Soerjoprajogo and Eros Djarot	Resesi	4:53
11.	"Sabda Alam" ("Nature's Order")	Junaedi Salat and Chrisye	Sabda Alam	4:51
12.	"Nona Lisa" ("Miss Lisa")	Tito Soemarsono, Deddy Dhukun, and Chrisye	Nona Lisa	3:55
13.	"Smaradhana" ("Passion")	Guruh Sukarnoputra	Sabda Alam	6:04
14.	"Aku Cinta Dia" ("I Love Her")	Adjie Soetama	Aku Cinta Dia	3:43
15.	"Untukku" ("For Me")	Yovie Widianto	Kala Cinta Menggoda	4:19
Total length:				71:36

== Release ==
Costumes such as this were considered "against cultural norms" and caused controversy when "Setia" was released as a music video

The album was released in 2001. At the same time, music videos for "Andai Aku Bisa" and "Setia" were released.

The music video for "Setia" raised controversy when it was released. Critics thought that some of the imagery, including a girl in a revealing outfit and feathers, went "against Eastern culture". Chrisye, the video's director Rizal Mantovani, and the producer Indrawati Wijaya stated that it could be changed if necessary and logical reasons were given, but they considered it suitable for broadcast. It was released unchanged.

Konser Tur 2001 has been reissued twice, once as a CD in 2004 and once as part of the Chrisye Masterpiece Trilogy Limited Edition in 2007.
