= Cintamu Telah Berlalu =

EP by Chrisye
- Released: November 1992
- Genre: Pop
- Length: 18:50
- Label: Musica Studios
- Producers: Younky Suwarno; Chrisye

Chrisye chronology
Pergilah Kasih (1991)	Cintamu Telah Berlalu (1992)	Sendiri Lagi (1993)

Cintamu Telah Berlalu (Your Love Has Passed; sometimes written as Cintamu T'lah Berlalu) is the debut and only extended play (EP) by Indonesian singer, Chrisye, released in 1992 by Musica Studios.

== Production ==
Chrisye and producer Younky Suwarno began working on Cintamu Telah Berlalu in early 1992. He decided to re-recorded these older songs in an EP format.

The EP contains one cover song by Koes Plus, two songs that each appeared on Chrisye's previous recordings, and one song written by Chrisye and Adjie Soetama that had previously been sung by Vina Panduwinata. On the EP, Chrisye provided both lead and backing vocals, with Suwarno plays drums and keyboards as well as bass programming, Mus Mujiono on electric guitars and Doddy Sukaman on keyboards. B.U. 90 and Bina Vokalia provided backing vocals.

== Release and reception ==
Cintamu Telah Berlalu was released in December 1992 to critical success and won a BASF Award for Best Arrangement. The music video for the title track was directed by Jay Subyakto and first broadcast on MTV Southeast Asia and became the first Indonesian music video to be broadcast on the American version of MTV. In 2007, the EP was released as part of the Chrisye Masterpiece Trilogy Limited Edition box set.

== Track listing ==
No.	Title	Lyrics	Music	Arrangement	Length
1.	"Cintamu Telah Berlalu" ("Your Love Has Passed")	Tonny Koeswoyo	Tonny Koeswoyo	Younky Suwarno	3:24
2.	"Lagu Putih" ("The White Song")	Guruh Sukarnoputra	Guruh Sukarnoputra	Chrisye; Doddy Sukaman	5:22
3.	"Lilin-Lilin Kecil" ("Small Candles")	James F. Sundah	James F. Sundah	Younky Suwarno	5:04
4.	"Cinta" ("Love")	Adjie Soetama	Chrisye	Younky Suwarno	4:00
Total length:					18:50

== Works cited ==
- "Chrisye Rilis Album Trilogi" [Chrisye Releases a Trilogy Album]. IndonesiaSelebriti.com (in Indonesian). Media Entertainment Online. 9 October 2007. Archived from the original on 27 March 2012.
- "Chrisye, Mini Album 4 Lagu" [Chrisye releases extended play with four tracks]. Neraca. 2 March 1992. p. 5.
- "Chrisye: Sakit Setiap Berkarya" [Chrisye: Ill Every Time He Records]. Kompas (in Indonesian). 16 August 1992. p. 7.
- Cintamu Telah Berlalu (Media notes). Chrisye. Musica Studios. 1992.
- Sakri, Denny (2007). Chrisye Masterpiece Trilogi 02 (Media notes). Chrisye. Musica Studios.
- Chrisye: In Memoriam (VCD). Chrisye. Musica Studios. 2007.
- Subyakto, Jay (2007). "Kalau sudah lihat bukti, Chrisye akan fanatik...!" [If he saw proof, Chrisye would be fanatical...!]. In Endah, Alberthiene (ed.). Chrisye: Sebuah Memoar Musikal [Chrisye: A Musical Memoir] (in Indonesian). Jakarta: Gramedia Pustaka Utama. p. 348. ISBN 978-979-22-2606-5.
- Hariyadi, Mathias; Redana, Bre; Mulyadi, Efix (20 September 1998). "Lebih Jauh dengan Chrisye" [Further with Chrisye]. Kompas (in Indonesian). p. 2.
- "Chrisye: Menjadi Penyanyi Bukan Pilihan" [Chrisye: Becoming a Singer was Not a Choice]. Kompas (in Indonesian). 17 October 1993. p. 7.
- KS, Theodore (30 April 2007). "Mengenang Chrisye: Musisi Kaya Diskografi" [Remembering Chrisye: A Musician with a Rich Discography]. Kompas (in Indonesian). p. 40.
