= Chrisye Masterpiece Trilogy Limited Edition =

Box set by Chrisye
- Released: 2007
- Recorded: 1978–2004
- Genre: Pop, folk, dance, 1980s
- Length: 15:55:05; 6:03:17 (Trilogi 01); 4:36:48 (Trilogi 02); 5:54:18 (Trilogi 03)
- Label: Musica Studios
- Producer: Musica Studios

Chrisye chronology
Chrisye Duet by Request (2006)	Chrisye Masterpiece Trilogy Limited Edition (2007)

Masterpiece Trilogy Limited Edition is a series of three box sets from Indonesian singer Chrisye which is a collection of all of his albums released between 1978 and 2004. Each box set contains 7 CDs and a booklet.

In the 26-year span, Chrisye released 21 albums, beginning with Sabda Alam (1978) and ending with Senyawa (2004). He also released his first and only EP, Cintamu Telah Berlalu (1990). However, the box set does not contain Jurang Pemisah which is produced by an independent label, Pramaqua Records.

== Discography ==
Trilogi 1 (First Trilogy)

1. Sabda Alam (1978)
2. Percik Pesona (1979)
3. Puspa Indah (1980)
4. Pantulan Cita (1981)
5. Resesi (1983)
6. Metropolitan (1984)
7. Nona (1984)

Trilogi 2 (Second Trilogy)

1. Sendiri (1984)
2. Aku Cinta Dia (1985)
3. Hip Hip Hura (1985)
4. Nona Lisa (1986)
5. Jumpa Pertama (1988)
6. Pergilah Kasih (1989)
7. Cintamu Telah Berlalu (1990)

Trilogi 3 (Third Trilogy)

1. Sendiri Lagi (1993)
2. AkustiChrisye (1996)
3. Kala Cinta Menggoda (1997)
4. Badai Pasti Berlalu
5. Konser Tur 2001 (2001)
6. Dekade (2002)
7. Senyawa (2004)
