= AkustiChrisye =

Studio album by Chrisye
- Released: 1996
- Studio: Studios 301 (Sydney)
- Genre: Acoustic
- Length: 62:28
- Label: Musica Studios
- Producer: Erwin Gutawa

Chrisye chronology
Sendiri Lagi (1993)	AkustiChrisye (1996)	Kala Cinta Menggoda (1997)

AkustiChrisye is a sixteenth studio album by the Indonesian singer, Chrisye, released in 1996 by Musica Studios. Produced by Erwin Gutawa, it includes acoustic versions of several of his earlier songs, as well as new material.

== Production ==
Chrisye and Erwin Gutawa, a conductor who had coordinated Chrisye's first solo concert in 1994, began working on what was to become AkustiChrisye in 1995. Realising that Western artists such as Frank Sinatra had found success in rearranging their older songs, the two decided to do the same with Chrisye's older work. They chose the songs "Kala Sang Surya Tenggelam" ("When the Sun Set"), "Anak Jalanan" ("Street Child"), and "Smaradhana" ("Passion") from the 1978 album Sabda Alam, as well as "Gita Cinta – Puspa Indah" ("Love Song – Beautiful Flower"), a remix of two songs from the 1980 album Puspa Indah. The album also saw several new songs, written by other artists.

The album focused on using acoustic music, which Chrisye described as simple but still requiring serious work. At the time the genre had seen a resurgence in Indonesia, with the state broadcaster TVRI carrying several shows which featured acoustic music. The audio was recorded at Studios 301 in Sydney, Australia, with a full orchestra providing backing in a period of three hours. Gutawa had chosen to record in Australia as better equipment was available there, and, although expensive, Aciu Widjaja of Musica Studios agreed immediately.

== Release and reception ==
The album was released as a cassette by Musica Studios in 1996 to popular success. "Damai Bersamamu" was the album's only single, while both it and "Kala Sang Surya Tenggelam" received music videos. Chrisye would later emphasise acoustic music on his 1997 album Kala Cinta Menggoda (When Love Tempts), and continue his collaboration with Gutawa until 2002's Dekade (Decade).

AkustiChrisye has been reissued twice, once as a CD in 2004 and once as part of the Chrisye Masterpiece Trilogy Limited Edition in 2007.

== Track listing ==
No.	Title	Writer(s)	Length
1.	"Damai Bersamamu" ("Peace with You")	Johny Sahilatua	5:10
2.	"Kala Sang Surya Tenggelam" ("When the Sun Set")	Guruh Soekarnoputra	4:47
3.	"Zamrud Katulistiwa" ("The Equator")	Guruh Soekarnoputra	5:22
4.	"Pagi" ("Morning")	Chrisye & Adjie Soetama	5:44
5.	"Gita Cinta – Puspa Indah" ("Love Song – Beautiful Flower")	Guruh Soekarnoputra & Eddy D. Iskandar	5:21
6.	"Smaradhana" ("Passion")	Guruh Soekarnoputra	6:03
7.	"Kesan di Matamu" ("Impression in Your Eyes")	Chossy Pratama	4:00
8.	"Aku Suka" ("I Like It")	Cecep AS & Sam Bobo	5:12
9.	"Di Mana" ("Where")	Chrisye & Lulu Gutawa	4:44
10.	"Anak Jalanan" ("Street Child")	Guruh Soekarnoputra	5:20
Total length:			62:28
