= Pantulan Cita =

Studio album by Chrisye
- Released: 1 January 1981
- Genres: Pop, rock
- Length: 45:43
- Label: Musica Studios
- Producers: Jockie Soerjoprajogo; Chrisye

Chrisye chronology
| Puspa Indah (1980) | Pantulan Cita (1981) | Resesi (1983) |

Pantulan Cita (English: Reflection of Dreams) is the fifth studio album by the Indonesian singer Chrisye, released on 1 January 1981 by Musica Studios. Recorded with much input from Jockie Soerjoprajogo, the album had rock influences and a cover design showing Chrisye's face as a puzzle. It was a critical and commercial failure, leading Chrisye to take a two-year sabbatical.

== Production ==
Although Chrisye's previous albums had been pure pop, continuing the success of Badai Pasti Berlalu (The Storm Shall Surely Pass; 1977), with Pantulan Cita Chrisye and his collaborator Jockie Soerjoprajogo began experimenting, mixing rock sounds. Chrisye was uncertain that this would work. The album was recorded with Chrisye on vocals and bass guitar, Jockie on keyboard, Jerry on electric and acoustic guitar, and Yaya M. on drums. Indah Sukotjo provided backing vocals for "Tragedi Badai" ("Tragedy of the Storm"). The arrangement was handled by Jockie, who also wrote most of the lyrics; Harry Sabar wrote the lyrics for three songs, while Jockie did seven.

Ayik Soegeng, who had previously designed the cover for Guruh Gipsy – a collaboration between Guruh Sukarnoputra and Sabda Nada, a band featuring Chrisye – in 1976, was selected to design the cover for Pantulan Cita. The photographers Firman Ichsan and Tara Sastrowardoyo initially intended to have a portrait of Chrisye holding a headshot of himself over his face. However, the photographer later decided that portraying Chrisye's face on a puzzle would be more effective. Soegeng was asked to create the puzzle, taking the photograph initially meant to be held by Chrisye, gluing it to plywood, then cutting out the puzzle with a jigsaw. Chrisye was pleased with the result.

== Release and reception ==
Pantulan Cita was released on New Year's Day 1981 by Musica Studios, with no singles. It was a critical and commercial failure, although the cover was well received. Along with Percik Pesona (Stain of Enchantment; 1979), it was Chrisye's only solo album to not receive any awards. Disappointed with the album's failure, Chrisye decided to go on a sabbatical. He would not record another album until Resesi (Recession), a collaboration with Jockie and Eros Djarot, in 1983. The later album was more successful, but followed then-popular trends in music.

Pantulan Cita has been reissued twice, once as a CD in 2004 and once as part of the Chrisye Masterpiece Trilogy Limited Edition in 2007.

== Track listing ==
| No. | Title | Lyrics | Music | Length |
|---|---|---|---|---|
| 1. | "Kencana" ("Gold") | Jockie Soerjoprajogo | Jockie Soerjoprajogo | 4:43 |
| 2. | "Sentuhanmu" ("Your Touch") | Harry Sabar | Jerry and Jockie Soerjoprajogo | 5:23 |
| 3. | "Desah Kalbum" ("Soul's Sigh") | Jockie Soerjoprajogo | Jockie Soerjoprajogo | 4:38 |
| 4. | "Kala Mega Kian Mendung" ("When The Sky Became Cloudier") | Harry Sabar | Harry Sabar | 4:14 |
| 5. | "Tragedi" ("Tragedy") | Jockie Soerjoprajogo | Jerry and Jockie Soerjoprajogo | 3:02 |
| 6. | "Tragedi Badai" ("Tragedy of the Storm") | Jockie Soerjoprajogo | Jerry and Jockie Soerjoprajogo | 4:53 |
| 7. | "Putri Ayu" ("Beautiful Girl") | Jockie Soerjoprajogo | Jockie Soerjoprajogo | 4:55 |
| 8. | "Perkasa Manusia" ("Mankind's Strength") | Jockie Soerjoprajogo | Jockie Soerjoprajogo | 3:46 |
| 9. | "Hening" ("Silent") | Jockie Soerjoprajogo | Jockie Soerjoprajogo | 5:24 |
| 10. | "Pantulan Cita" ("Reflection of Dreams") | Harry Sabar | Chrisye | 4:12 |
| Total length: | | | | 45:43 |
