= Sendiri =

Studio album by Chrisye
- Released: March 1985
- Genre: Pop
- Length: 41:43
- Label: Musica Studios
- Producers: Addie MS; Chrisye

Chrisye chronology
| Nona (1984) | Sendiri (1985) | Aku Cinta Dia (1986) |

Sendiri (Alone) is a ninth studio album by Indonesian singer Chrisye, released in March 1985 by Musica Studios.

== Production ==
After the release of Nona (Miss; 1984), Chrisye broke off his three album collaboration with Eros Djarot and Jockie Soerjoprajogo as he was tired of art rock. Looking for a change, he approached Addie MS to be the music director. Addie, who considered Chrisye his idol, was initially uncertain if he was of the same caliber as Chrisye's previous partners. Chrisye, who had been observing Addie's work with his friend Keenan Nasution as well as Vina Panduwinata's debut album Citra Biru (Blue Image; 1981) and enjoyed what he heard, insisted.

Once Addie was convinced to work on the album, he approached the issue aggressively. Chrisye's recent trilogy had been heavily inspired by art rock, which was a departure from the original romantic pop sound that Chrisye had had with the successful albums Badai Pasti Berlalu (The Storm will Surely Pass; 1977) and Sabda Alam (Nature's Order; 1978); Addie insisted that the new album should harken back to those earlier albums. Together Chrisye and Addie planned the album in Addie's home in Tebet, South Jakarta; Addie later recalled that they both overthought the issues, as both were perfectionists. Addie also served as sound engineer with Irsan. Eros wrote the lyrics to nine of the songs on the album.

Addie arranged for the musicians. Heidi Awuy played the harp, Yudhianto played the cor anglais and oboe, while Chrisye's brother-in-law Raidy Noor (who also composed the song "Windy") played the bass. Uce Haryono played the guitar, while Ian Antono played guitar. A string section, consisting of Suryati Supilin, Su Yin, Edo, Kwang Tju, and Zulkifli, was hired to provide further backing. Vina Panduwinata was booked to perform "Lestariku" ("My Eternity") in a duet with Chrisye; Addie later told her that the song had been written with a duet with her in mind.

== Style ==
The titular song, "Sendiri", is accompanied only by piano and cor anglais music. According to Addie, when he proposed such an arrangement Chrisye initially had difficulty believing that it could be successful; at the time, no such arrangement had been used on an Indonesian song.

== Release ==
Sendiri was released in March 1985 with a cover was designed by Chrisye's childhood friend Gauri Nasution and photography by Tara and Firman. It was well received and spawned three singles: "Kisah Insani", "Sendiri", and "Lestariku" ("My Eternity"). Sendiri won that year's BASF Award for best selling album, selling over 100,000 copies.

== Reissues ==
Sendiri has been reissued twice, once as a CD in 2004 and once as part of the Chrisye Masterpiece Trilogy Limited Edition in 2007.

== Track listing ==
| No. | Title | Lyrics | Music | Length |
|---|---|---|---|---|
| 1. | "Kisah Insani" ("Human Story") | Eros Djarot & Iman RN. | Chrisye | 4:14 |
| 2. | "Hatimu & Hatiku" ("Your Heart & My Heart") | Eros Djarot | Chrisye | 4:09 |
| 3. | "Sendiri" ("Alone") | Guruh Sukarnoputra | Guruh Sukarnoputra | 4:00 |
| 4. | "Windy" | Eros Djarot | Razi Noor | 5:44 |
| 5. | "Lestariku" ("My Eternity") | Junaedi Salat | Chrisye | 4:28 |
| 6. | "Dekadensi" ("Decadence") | Eros Djarot | Chrisye | 3:22 |
| 7. | "Malu" ("Embarrassed") | Eros Djarot | Chrisye | 5:14 |
| 8. | "Wanita" ("Women") | Eros Djarot | Chrisye | 4:15 |
| 9. | "Cemburu" ("Jealous") | Eros Djarot | Chrisye | 3:22 |
| 10. | "Aku dan Dia" ("She and I") | Eros Djarot | Chrisye | 3:47 |
| Total length: | | | | 41:43 |
