= Sendiri Lagi =

Studio album by Chrisye
- Released: July 1993
- Recorded: 1992–1993
- Genre: Pop
- Length: 46:15
- Label: Musica Studios
- Producer: Younky Suwarno

Chrisye chronology
Cintamu Telah Berlalu (1992)	Sendiri Lagi (1993)	AkustiChrisye (1996)

Sendiri Lagi (Alone Again) is the fifteenth studio album by Indonesian singer, Chrisye, released in July 1993 by Musica Studios. Produced by Younky Suwarno, who serves as the arranger, the album was well received.

== Recording ==
Sendiri Lagi was Chrisye's fifteenth album and serves as the follow-up to his 1984 album, Sendiri. Chrisye and producer Younky Suwarno began recorded Sendiri Lagi in early 1993. Both required four months of planning and another four months of recording to get the best result.

"Lirih" was originally intended to be part of the album, but didn't make the final cut. Aryono Huboyo Djati, the song's composer, said the song was not included in Sendiri Lagi as "it didn't meet standards, unless it needed minor revisions". (Note: Original: "..."karena tidak memenuhi standar, melainkan harus melalui sedikit revisi".) Aryono revealed due to the deadline, the song was ultimately dropped from the album. "Lirih" was released posthumously in August 2008, one year after Chrisye's death.

== Track listing ==
No.	Title	Writer(s)	Length
1.	"Sendiri Lagi" ("Alone Again")	Ryan Kyoto	4:39
2.	"Oh Cintaku" ("Oh My Love")	Tito Sumarsono	4:12
3.	"Masa Kecil" ("Childhood")	Chrisye, Rina R.D.	4:33
4.	"Memori Kita" ("Our Memories")	Dadang S. Manaf	4:17
5.	"Januari Yang Indah" ("The Beautiful January")	Chrisye, Deddy Dhukun	5:00
6.	"Pergilah Kekasih" ("Go Away Lover")	Yudis, Ntl	4:14
7.	"Seperti Dulu" ("Like Before")	Mira Lesmana	5:46
8.	"Cinta Kita" ("Our Love")	Chrisye, Rina R.D.	4:25
9.	"Semua Sudah Lain" ("Everything's Different")	Billy B., Acha Haiz	4:19
10.	"Haruskah" ("Should It Be")	Dian Pramana Poetra, Dani Mamesah	4:55
Total length:			46:15

== Release and reception ==
The album was released in July 1993 and was well received, with the title song was released as the only single. Its music video, directed by Jay Subyakto, was also premiered on MTV Southeast Asia. Although Sendiri Lagi did fairly well, in the beginning of the 1990s Chrisye began to feel pressure from the increasingly visual-oriented music industry and growing amount of young talent. He again began considering leaving the music industry, feeling as if he had already "reached the finish line". (Note: Original: "Saya merasa sudah sampai garis finish.")

Sendiri Lagi has been reissued twice, once as a CD in 2004 and once as part of the Chrisye Masterpiece Trilogy Limited Edition in 2007.

== Works cited ==
- "Chrisye Rilis Album Trilogi" [Chrisye Releases a Trilogy Album]. IndonesiaSelebriti.com (in Indonesian). Media Entertainment Online. 9 October 2007. Archived from the original on 27 March 2012.
- "Chrisye Rilis Ulang 22 Album Lawas" [Chrisye Rereleases 22 Old Albums]. KotaBNI News (in Indonesian). 28 October 2004. Archived from the original on 5 April 2012.
- Endah, Alberthiene (2007). Chrisye: Sebuah Memoar Musikal [Chrisye: A Musical Memoir] (in Indonesian). Jakarta: Gramedia. ISBN 978-979-22-2606-5.
- Sendiri Lagi (Media notes). Chrisye. Musica Studios. 1993.
- Sakri, Denny (2007). Chrisye Masterpiece Trilogi 02 (Media notes). Chrisye. Musica Studios.
- Chrisye: In Memoriam (VCD). Chrisye. Musica Studios. 2007.
- Sartono, Frans (1 April 2007). "Chrisye: Dari Lilin Kecil ke Badai" [Chrisye: From a Small Candle to a Storm]. Kompas (in Indonesian). p. 1.
- "Chrisye: Sakit Setiap Berkarya" [Chrisye: Ill Every Time He Records]. Kompas (in Indonesian). 16 August 1992. p. 7.
- "Chrisye: Menjadi Penyanyi Bukan Pilihan" [Chrisye: Becoming a Singer was Not a Choice]. Kompas (in Indonesian). 17 October 1993. p. 7.
- Erlin (2 August 2008). "'Lirih', Lagu Tertunda Chrisye Dirilis" ['Lirih', Chrisye's Unreleased Song Was Released] (in Indonesian). KapanLagi.com.
