= Resesi =

Studio album by Chrisye
- Released: February 1983
- Recorded: 1982–1983
- Genre: Pop
- Length: 50:40
- Label: Musica Studios
- Producers: Eros Djarot; Chrisye; Jockie Soerjoprajogo

Chrisye chronology
Pantulan Cita (1981)	Resesi (1983)	Metropolitan (1984)

Resesi (literally Recession) is the sixth studio album by the Indonesian singer Chrisye, released in February 1983 by Musica Studios. Recorded in collaboration with Jockie Soerjoprajogo and Eros Djarot after the latter's return from Germany, Resesi was inspired by the sound of The Police and featured songs influenced by CB radio and social criticism. It was a commercial hit upon release, selling 350,000 copies and being certified silver. In 2007 Rolling Stone Indonesia listed it as the 82nd best Indonesian album of all time.

== Production ==
After the failure of the Pantulan Cita album due to the emergence of Jamal Mirdad on the Indonesian music scene, several new singers who were younger and had adequate musical abilities and had a more homogeneous taste 'connection' with young music enthusiasts, Chrisye became confused about this. Apart from his disappointment with the film Seindah Rembulan (As Beautiful as the Moon), Chrisye had taken a long sabbatical. In early 1983 Eros Djarot, who had collaborated with the singer on the highly successful soundtrack album Badai Pasti Berlalu in 1977, returned to Indonesia after studying cinematography in Germany. This inspired Chrisye to ask him to record a new album in collaboration with Jockie Soerjoprajogo. Although Djarot had not been involved in music for several years, he agreed.

On the album Chrisye provided vocals and played the bass, while Soerjoprajogo played several instruments – including the mandolin. They were joined by Ian Antono on the electric and acoustic guitars and Uce Hudioro on drums. Djarot served primarily as a songwriter. Recording was completed at Musica Studios' recording rooms number I and II, with H. Rusmin as operator. Soerjoprajogo arranged the music. The owner of Musica, Aciu Wijaya, suggested that they adopt a currently trending genre to ensure marketability; ultimately the result was similar to songs by The Police. Chrisye felt that Sting's bass performances for the band had made their songs more powerful; as such, he modeled his playing style after the British performer.

During his hiatus Chrisye had become involved in CB radio, listening but not broadcasting; this influenced the song "Polusi Udara" ("Air Pollution"). For the song "Sentuhan Cinta" Chrisye was joined by Hetty Koes Endang, who served as a backing vocalist. With Djarot's influence two of the songs – "Money" and "Resesi" ("Recession") – began taking a critical view of society. Meanwhile, Chrisye refused to sing "Malam Pertama" ("Wedding Night"), not speaking with Soerjoprajogo, until he was convinced to do so by Djarot. "Resesi" was chosen to be the album's title track after a vote.

== Track listing ==
No.	Title	Writer(s)	Length
1.	"Lenny"	Chrisye and Eros Djarot	4:38
2.	"Malam Pertama" ("Wedding Night")	Jockie Soerjoprajogo and Eros Djarot	4:52
3.	"Resesi" ("Recession")	Chrisye, Eros Djarot, and Jockie Soerjoprajogo	4:50
4.	"Sentuhan Cinta" ("Love's Touch")	Jockie Soerjoprajogo and Eros Djarot	5:00
5.	"Di Batas Akhir Senja" ("At the Boundary of Dusk")	Jockie Soerjoprajogo and Eros Djarot	5:31
6.	"Money"	Jockie Soerjoprajogo and Eros Djarot	5:51
7.	"Anak Manusia" ("Child of Mankind")	Chrisye and Eros Djarot	5:18
8.	"Polusi Udara" ("Air Pollution")	Jockie Soerjoprajogo	4:49
9.	"Hening" ("Silent")	Chrisye, Eros Djarot, and Jockie Soerjoprajogo	4:30
10.	"Juwita" ("Beautiful")	Jockie Soerjoprajogo and Eros Djarot	5:28
Total length:			50:40

== Release and reception ==
The album was released in February 1983. To promote the album three songs, "Lenny", "Hening" ("Silent"), and "Malam Pertama", were released as singles; Chrisye also performed "Lenny" live on Aneka Ria Safari, a variety show on the state-owned broadcaster TVRI. Resesi was a commercial success, selling 350,000 copies and being certified silver. Chrisye saved his returns, saving towards a home for him and his wife. After this success, Chrisye would record another two collaborations with Soerjoprajogo and Djarot, Metropolitan and Nona (both 1984). He would continue to perform several of the tracks, including "Hening" and "Malam Pertama", in concerts until his death.

Frans Sartono, writing for Kompas after Chrisye's death in 2007, found the album to "cleverly" (cerdik) include white reggae influences from The Police. He suggests that the introduction of the title track "Resesi" is similar to the Police's "Walking on the Moon". Indonesian music critic Denny Sakri considered it a refreshing comeback for Chrisye.

Resesi has been reissued twice, once as a CD in 2004 and once as part of the Chrisye Masterpiece Trilogy Limited Edition in 2007. In 2007 Rolling Stone Indonesia selected it as the 82nd best Indonesian album of all time, the lowest ranked of Chrisye's three solo albums on the list.

== Works cited ==
- "150 Album Indonesia Terbaik Sepanjang Masa" [150 Best Indonesian Albums of All Time]. Rolling Stone Indonesia (in Indonesian) (32). Jakarta: a&e Media: 77. December 2007.
- "Chrisye Rilis Album Trilogi" [Chrisye Releases a Trilogy Album]. IndonesiaSelebriti.com (in Indonesian). Media Entertainment Online. 9 October 2007. Archived from the original on 27 March 2012.
- "Chrisye Rilis Ulang 22 Album Lawas" [Chrisye Rereleases 22 Old Albums]. KotaBNI News (in Indonesian). 28 October 2004. Archived from the original on 5 April 2012.
- Endah, Alberthiene (2007). Chrisye: Sebuah Memoar Musikal [Chrisye: A Musical Memoir] (in Indonesian). Jakarta: Gramedia. ISBN 978-979-22-2606-5.
- KS, Theodore (30 April 2007). "Mengenang Chrisye: Musisi Kaya Diskografi" [Remembering Chrisye: A Musician with a Rich Discography]. Kompas (in Indonesian). p. 40.
- Resesi (Media notes). Chrisye. Musica Studios. 1983.
- Sakri, Denny (2007). Chrisye Masterpiece Trilogi 01 (Media notes). Chrisye. Musica Studios.
- Sartono, Frans (1 April 2007). "Chrisye: Dari Lilin Kecil ke Badai" [Chrisye: From a Small Candle to a Storm]. Kompas (in Indonesian). p. 1.
