= Puspa Indah =

Studio album by Chrisye
- Released: June 1980
- Genres: Pop, easy listening
- Length: 48:00
- Label: Musica Studios
- Producers: Guruh Sukarnoputra; Chrisye; Jockie Soerjoprajogo

Chrisye chronology
Percik Pesona (1979)	Puspa Indah (1980)	Pantulan Cita (1981)

Puspa Indah (Beautiful Flower) is the fourth studio album by Indonesian singer Chrisye, released in June 1980 by Musica Studios. Recorded in collaboration with Guruh Soekarnoputra, the album, which had an easy listening influences, was well-received.

== Recording ==
After the failure of Percik Pesona (Stain of Enchantment; 1979), Chrisye decided to distance himself from the pure pop sound that had made the earlier albums Badai Pasti Berlalu (The Storm Will Surely Pass; 1977) and Sabda Alam (Nature's Order; 1978) successful. After a period of introspection and contemplation, he decided to stick with pop, but gave it a romantic theme with easy listening influences.

Guruh Soekarnoputra, songwriter son of former president Sukarno, contributed significantly to the project; he wrote the lyrics for all the songs except "To My Friends on Legian Beach" and "Gita Cinta" ("Serenade"), as well as all the melodies except "Interlude - Kenang-Kenangan" ("Interlude - Memories"). For "To My Friends on Legian Beach", Indonesian poet Sitor Situmorang wrote the lyrics, while Eddy Iskandar handled the lyrics for "Gita Cinta". The melody for "Interlude - Kenang-Kenangan" was written by long-term collaborator Jockie Soerjoprajogo.

Musically, Yockie played the keyboard and harmonica, while Chrisye played the bass and guitar, both electric and acoustic. Roesma of Musica Studios served as recording engineer during the recording sessions in Jakarta.

== Release and reception ==
Prior to the album's release, two of its singles, "Galih dan Ratna" ("Galih and Ratna") and "Gita Cinta" ("Serenade") were selected for inclusion in the 1979 film Gita Cinta dari SMA (High School Serenade). For marketing, Chrisye took a cameo role in the film as the singer of "Galih dan Ratna". Puspa Indah was released by Musica Studios in mid-1980, with high sales.

The success of Puspa Indah convinced Chrisye that some albums needed to be synergized with other media in order to succeed. Puspa Indah has been reissued twice, once as a CD in 2004 and once as part of the Chrisye Masterpiece Trilogy Limited Edition in 2007. In December 2007, Rolling Stone Indonesia selected Puspa Indah as the 57th best Indonesian album of all time.

== Track listing ==
No.	Title	Lyrics	Music	Length
1.	"Marlina"	Guruh Soekarnoputra	Guruh Soekarnoputra	3:41
2.	"Lagu Putih" ("White Song")	Guruh Soekarnoputra	Guruh Soekarnoputra	5:30
3.	"Kenang-Kenangan" ("Memories")	Guruh Soekarnoputra	Guruh Soekarnoputra	4:40
4.	"Puspa Indah" ("Beautiful Flower")	Guruh Soekarnoputra	Guruh Soekarnoputra	6:17
5.	"Lakon Manusia" ("Human Story")	Guruh Soekarnoputra	Guruh Soekarnoputra	3:20
6.	"Interlude - Kenang-Kenangan" ("Interlude - Memories")	Guruh Soekarnoputra	Yockie Suryoprayogo	5:00
7.	"Sirna" ("Disappear")	Guruh Soekarnoputra	Guruh Soekarnoputra	3:44
8.	"To My Friends on Legian Beach"	Sitor Situmorang	Guruh Soekarnoputra	4:57
9.	"Gita Cinta" ("Serenade")	Eddy S. Iskandar	Guruh Soekarnoputra	5:11
10.	"Galih dan Ratna" ("Galih and Ratna")	Guruh Soekarnoputra	Guruh Soekarnoputra	5:11
Total length:				48:00
