= Senyawa =

Studio album by Chrisye
- Released: 22 October 2004
- Recorded: 2003–2004
- Genre: Pop
- Length: 37:55
- Label: Musica Studios
- Producer: Chrismansyah Rahadi

Chrisye chronology
Dekade (2002)	Senyawa (2004)

Senyawa ([səˈɲawa]; English: One Soul) is a twentieth and final studio album by Indonesian singer, Chrisye, released on 22 October 2004 by Musica Studios. The album features a collaboration with numerous Indonesian singers and bands, including Project Pop, Peterpan, Ahmad Dhani, and Ungu.

== Creation ==
Senyawa was heavily influenced by Chrisye. He became the album's producer, replacing Erwin Gutawa, who had produced his last few albums. He decided on a collaboration album with younger Indonesian artists, eventually working with Musica artists Ahmad Dhani of Dewa, Ungu, Peterpan, Naif, and Project Pop as well as Sony Music Entertainment artists Erros Chandra of Sheila on 7 and Tohpati.

Due to the different styles of each artists, the songs fit into numerous genres. For example, the song "Bur-Kat (Buruan Katakan)" (English: Say It Quickly) with Project Pop, featured rap. Chrisye found this difficult, and took six takes to record "Bur-Kat".

== Track listing ==
No.	Title	With	Length
1.	"Jika Surga dan Neraka Tak Pernah Ada" ("If Heaven and Hell Never Existed")	Ahmad Dhani	4:15
2.	"Bur-Kat" ("Say It Quickly")	Project Pop	3:49
3.	"Menunggumu" ("Waiting for You")	Peterpan	3:46
4.	"Luna Kelam" ("Dark Moon")	Erros Chandra, of Sheila on 7	4:59
5.	"Panah Asmara" ("Passion's Arrow")	Tohpati	4:07
6.	"Beku" ("Frozen")	Ricky Tjahyadi (Five Minutes), Lusman	4:05
7.	"Cinta Yang Lain" ("Another Love")	Ungu	4:18
8.	"Suatu Persembahan Cinta" ("A Tribute to Love")	Ferdy Tahier, of El Em Ent (Element)	4:30
9.	"Tjah Ajoe" ("Pretty Face")	Naif	4:02
Total length:			37:55

== Reception ==
Senyawa was released in 22 October 2004. However, not long after its release, Sony Music Entertainment Indonesia (SMI) filed a complaint about the cover of the album, which featured the names of Erros Chandra and Tohpati on the cover, who were under contract to SMI; Erros and Tohpati were also featured on pictures in the liner notes. As a result, Musica Studios withdrew the album from circulation and later reissued it with a new, redesigned cover without Erros and Tohpati. Chrisye later expressed regret that legal issues prevented him from recognizing Eross and Tohpati's contributions. Despite the controversy, the album sold well.

Four songs from Senyawa, "Cinta Yang Lain", "Menunggumu", "Bur-Kat", and "Jika Surga dan Neraka Tak Pernah Ada", were made into music videos. The music video for "Menunggumu" was filmed just before Chrisye was diagnosed with lung cancer; it was one of his last music videos.

In 2007, the album was reissued as part of the Chrisye Masterpiece Trilogy Limited Edition box set.
