= Naif (band) =

Indonesian Rock Band

- Origin: Jakarta, Indonesia
- Genres: Pop, rock n' roll, indie pop, pop rock, indie rock
- Years active: 1995–2021
- Labels: Bulletin Records; Electrified Records; Catz Records; Demajors
- Past members: David Bayu Danangjaya; Fajar Endra Taruna Mangkudisastro; Shendy; Chandra Sukardi; Franki Indrasmoro Sumbodo; Mohammad Amil Hussein
- Website: www.naifband.com

Naif was an Indonesian rock band from Jakarta, formed in 1995. The band consisted of David Bayu Danangjaya (vocals), Fajar Endra Taruna Mangkudisastro (guitar & backing vocals), Franki Indrasmoro Sumbodo (drums), and Mohammad Amil Hussein (bass & backing vocals). They were known for their retro sound and style. Two of their albums, Naif (1998) and Titik Cerah (2002), and two of their songs, "Mobil Balap" ("Racecar") and "Posesif" ("Possessive"), were listed by Rolling Stone Indonesia in its lists of the best Indonesian albums and songs of all time. The band disbanded in 2021 after exactly 25 years.

== History ==
Naif was formed by Franki Indrasmoro Sumbodo (Pepeng; drums), David Bayu Danangjaya (David; vocals), Fajar Endra Taruna Mangkudisastro (Jarwo; guitar), and Shendy (keyboard) – all students of the Jakarta Art Institute (Institut Kesenian Jakarta) – in 1995, when the young men gathered at Shendy's house to work on an assignment. Inspired by a televised Nirvana concert, they wrote their first song, "Jauh" ("Far"). Shendy was soon replaced by Chandra Sukardi (Chandra), while Mohammad Amil Hussein (Emil; bass) joined some time later. They began to play on campus and visit several recording studios. After a friend suggested that their music was simple yet harmonic, the group took up the name Naif; it had the added benefit of being easy to remember.

After hearing that Indo Semar Sakti, a label of Bulletin Records, was preparing a compilation album, Naif sent a demo cassette to the company. This demo, consisting of "Picnic '72'", "Benci Libur" ("Hate the Holidays"), and "Just B", was at first refused. However, with the inclusion of the more upbeat "Mobil Balap" ("Racecar"), the group was accepted and booked for a self-titled album; their sound was deemed unsuitable to the compilation album. This debut album, released in 1998, spawned several singles, including "Mobil Balap" ("Racecar"). However, it was a commercial failure, selling only 20,000 copies; it had been released in the middle of a recession.

Two years later, Naif released the album Jangan Terlalu Naif (Don't Be Too Naive); it sold 500,000 copies. In 2002, they released Titik Cerah (A Point of Clarity).

Chandra left the band few days before Naif band held their 8th anniversary "Sewindu Naif" in 2003 to pursue a career in graphic design, which he had majored in. The following year, the band collaborated with senior singer Chrisye on the song "Tjah Ayoe" ("Beautiful Face"), for the latter's 2004 album Senyawa (One Soul). The members wrote the song together, while David sang a duet with Chrisye.

Naif released a comic and children's music album in 2008 as the animated band BonBinBen (short for Kebon Binatang Band; or Zoo Band). This featured the band members as anthropomorphic animals, based on their nicknames for each other: David became a gorilla named Si Gori, Emil became a wolf named Si Gala, Jarwo became a pony named Si Kupon and Pepeng became a monkey named Si Dungde. The band described BonBinBen as a separate band than Naif. The debut album for BonBinBen, entitled Di Rimba Hijau Kemilau (In the Shining Green Jungle) included eight songs.

In 2009 Naif covered several songs for the soundtrack to Ruma Maida (Maida's House), including songs from the 1940s such as "Juwita Malam" ("Beauty of the Night", by Ismail Marzuki), "Di Bawah Sinar Bulan Purnama" ("Under the Light of the Full Moon"; by R. Maladi) and "Ibu Pertiwi" ("Motherland"). The covers were recorded over a period of five days.

Naif established their own indie label, Electrified Records, in 2009; they found work with major labels to be overly restrictive. Around that time the members began working on their own side-projects. Jarwo released a solo instrumental album entitled Mr. J. - 1st Journey, then David created a sneaker design for Cosmic clothing; the vocalist later released a solo album entitled DVD Boy. The following year, Pepeng released a series of five comics detailing a fictionalised version of the band's formation and development.

Naif released their eighth and last album 7 Bidadari (7 Angels) on October 22, 2017, to coincide with the band's 22nd anniversary, this was released under Demajors. The band's bassist, Emil announced his departure from Naif in September 2020 then followed by drummer, Pepeng. Lead singer David announced on 10 May 2021 that the latter two's departure marking the end of the band's successful musical journey, and the band was officially disbanded after exactly 25 years. Prior to their disbandment, Naif has never once performed on stage since the onset of the COVID-19 pandemic.

== Style ==
Hera Diani, writing in The Jakarta Post, describes the band as having a sound reminiscent of music from the 1960s and 1970s. She describes them as having a tacky style of fashion, and David as having a "hilarious stage act" involving off-key dancing and jumping.

== Legacy ==
In 2009, Rolling Stone Indonesia listed two of Naif's songs in their list of the best Indonesian songs of all time. "Mobil Balap" placed at 55 and was described as Naif's most popular song at concerts. The song "Posesif" ("Possessive"), which placed at number 96, was described as one of their most recognisable songs.

== Discography ==
=== Studio albums ===
- Naif (Naive; 1998)
- Jangan Terlalu Naif (Don't Be Too Naive; 2000)
- Titik Cerah (A Point of Clarity; 2002)
- Retropolis (2005)
- Televisi (Television: 2007)
- Let's Go! (2008)
- Planet Cinta (Planet of Love; 2011)
- 7 Bidadari (7 Angels; 2017)

=== Other albums ===
- The Best of Naif (2005)
- Di Rimba Hijau Kemilau (In the Shining Green Jungle; 2008) - children's album under the name BonBinBen
- A Night at Schowburg (2011)
