= Lilin-Lilin Kecil =

Popular song by James F. Sundah

- Remastered cover

Single by Chrisye

from the album LCLR Prambors I
- Released: 1977
- Genre: Pop; contemporary gospel
- Length: 5:05 (album version); 4:23 (edit)
- Label: Prambors
- Songwriter: James F. Sundah

Chrisye singles chronology
"Merpati Putih" (1977)	"Lilin-Lilin Kecil" (1977)	"Sabda Alam" (1978)

Audio sample
- Chrisye - "Lilin-Lilin Kecil" (1977 version): file; help

"Lilin-Lilin Kecil" ([ˈlilinlilin ˈkɛt͡ʃil], English: "Little Candles") is an Indonesian pop song written by James F. Sundah for the Prambors' 1977 Youth Songwriting Competition (Indonesian: Lomba Cipta Lagu Remaja) and performed by Chrisye.

Considered as Chrisye's signature song, "Lilin-Lilin Kecil" has been covered by over fifty artists. Rolling Stone Indonesia listed the song as the thirteenth best Indonesian song of all time.

== Composition ==
James F. Sundah, then only 21 years old, wrote "Lilin-Lilin Kecil" for Prambors' Youth Songwriting Competition of 1977. The song was composed in the keys of D major and F major.

Chrisye was chosen to be the singer for his smooth vocals. The song was arranged by Jockie Soerjoprajogo.

== Themes ==
According to Sundah, "Lilin-Lilin Kecil" is about his friends who had difficulties in life when older generations had successful careers. It has also been described as a memorial song.

== Reception ==
"Lilin-Lilin Kecil" placed fifth in the competition and was the most popular of the finalists on the Lomba Cipta Lagu Remaja album. The song boosted Chrisye's career and has been called his signature song. He considered its success to be due to its immersing melody and romantic lyrics with his smooth vocals. Rolling Stone Indonesia listed it as the thirteenth best Indonesian song of all time.

"Lilin-Lilin Kecil" has been used as a memorial song, such as at the sixth anniversary of the 2002 Bali bombing. Indonesian director Richard Buntario considered that the song as one of the examples of the contemporary gospel songs.

== 1992 version ==
"Lilin-Lilin Kecil"

Song by Chrisye

from the EP Cintamu Telah Berlalu
- Released: February 1992
- Length: 5:03
- Label: Musica
- Songwriter: James F. Sundah
- Producer: Younky Soewarno

In 1992, Chrisye re-recorded "Lilin-Lilin Kecil" for his first and only extended play Cintamu Telah Berlalu. This version featured Bina Vokalia, who provided children's backing vocals, and was arranged and produced by Younky Soewarno.

=== Personnel ===
Personnels adapted from album's liner notes.

- Younky Soewarno – drums, keyboards, arrangement
- B.U.90 – backing vocals
- Bina Vokalia – children's choir
  - Aria - children's voices
  - Asti - children's voices
  - Donny - children's voices
  - Gina - children's voices
  - Rily - children's voices
  - Tina - children's voices

== Other cover versions ==
"Lilin-Lilin Kecil" has been covered by over fifty singers and groups, including the Blue Diamonds, Victor Wood, and Arie Kosmiran. Instrumental versions were released by Alex Faraknimella and Yockie Soerjoprajogo.
