= Jumpa Pertama =

Studio album by Chrisye
- Released: November 1988
- Genre: Pop
- Length: 43:56
- Label: Musica Studios
- Producer: Younky Suwarno

Chrisye chronology
Nona Lisa (1987)	Jumpa Pertama (1988)	Pergilah Kasih (1991)

Jumpa Pertama (First Meeting) is a thirteenth studio album by Indonesian singer, Chrisye, released in November 1988 by Musica Studios. Recorded in collaboration with Younky Suwarno, the album, which had a more pop and funk influences, was well received. However, Chrisye was accused of plagiarism over the title song owing to similarities between it and Sheena Easton's song, "9 to 5".

== Production ==
After the release of Nona Lisa (1987), Chrisye ended his album collaboration with Adjie Soetama and approached Younky Suwarno to be the producer and arranger for his next album. He began working on the material for Jumpa Pertama and started recording the album in late 1988. Suwarno handles the arrangement and plays many instruments including keyboards. Other musicians involved in the album were Mus Mujiono on guitars, Uce Haryono on drums and Embong Rahardjo on saxophone.

They were also joined by singers Ferina Widodo, Lita Zen and Atiek CB, which they provided backing vocals. Songwriting was handled by Chrisye, Tito Sumarsono and Dadang S. Manaf (older brother of Ahmad Dhani). The cover art photography was taken by Indonesian photographer, Ferry Ardianto and designed by Budi Susatio. The main album cover is said to be influenced by the work of American pop art artist, Andy Warhol, featuring brightly coloured hues and stylised portrait of Chrisye. He was satisfied with the result.

== Release and reception ==
The album was released in November 1988. To promote the album, "Kisah Cintaku" ("My Love Story") and "Ada Cinta" ("There is Love"), were released as singles. Jumpa Pertama was a commercial success, selling over 100,000 copies and certified silver.

Jumpa Pertama has been reissued twice, once as a CD in 2004 and once as part of the Chrisye Masterpiece Trilogy Limited Edition in 2007.

The title song, "Jumpa Pertama", faced criticism due to its similarity to Sheena Easton's 1980 single "9 to 5" with the public accusing Chrisye of plagiarism. He later admitted his mistake over the issue and stated that he wasn't composed the song, but Andy Mapajalos.

== Track listing ==
No.	Title	Writer(s)	Length
1.	"Jumpa Pertama" ("First Meeting")	Andy Mapajalos	5:00
2.	"Kisah Cintaku" ("My Love Story"; feat. Atiek CB)	Tito Soemarsono	4:53
3.	"Ada Cinta" ("There is Love")	Chrisye, Deddy Dhukun	4:45
4.	"Hari Bahagia" ("Happy Day")	Chrisye, Dadang S. Manaf	5:13
5.	"Kau Ternyata" ("Obviously You")	Chrisye, Deddy Dhukun	3:50
6.	"Mungkinkah" ("Maybe")	Chrisye, Tito Sumarsono	5:06
7.	"Terus Berlari" ("Keep On Running")	Dadang S. Manaf	4:54
8.	"Ku Tahu" ("I Know")	Tito Sumarsono	4:18
9.	"Selamat Bahagia Kasih" (Have Fun, Dear)	Dadang S. Manaf	5:34
Total length:			43:56

== Works cited ==
- "Chrisye Rilis Album Trilogi" [Chrisye Releases a Trilogy Album]. IndonesiaSelebriti.com (in Indonesian). Media Entertainment Online. 9 October 2007. Archived from the original on 27 March 2012.
- "Chrisye Rilis Ulang 22 Album Lawas" [Chrisye Rereleases 22 Old Albums]. KotaBNI News (in Indonesian). 28 October 2004. Archived from the original on 5 April 2012.
- Endah, Alberthiene (2007). Chrisye: Sebuah Memoar Musikal [Chrisye: A Musical Memoir] (in Indonesian). Jakarta: Gramedia. ISBN 978-979-22-2606-5.
- Jumpa Pertama (Media notes). Chrisye. Musica Studios. 1988.
- Sakri, Denny (2007). Chrisye Masterpiece Trilogi 02 (Media notes). Chrisye. Musica Studios.
- Sartono, Frans (1 April 2007). "Chrisye: Dari Lilin Kecil ke Badai" [Chrisye: From a Small Candle to a Storm]. Kompas (in Indonesian). p. 1.
- "Chrisye: Sakit Setiap Berkarya" [Chrisye: Ill Every Time He Records]. Kompas (in Indonesian). 16 August 1992. p. 7.
- "Chrisye". Tempo (in Indonesian). 34 (7–12). Jajasan Jaya Raya: 84–86. 2005.
- "Lagu jiplakan" [Copied song]. Tempo (in Indonesian). 28 January 1989. Archived from the original on 4 March 2016.
