= Percik Pesona =

Studio album by Chrisye
- Released: August 1979
- Genres: Pop, progressive rock
- Length: 44:42
- Label: Musica Studios
- Producers: Jockie Soerjoprajogo; Chrisye

Chrisye chronology
| Sabda Alam (1978) | Percik Pesona (1979) | Puspa Indah (1980) |

Percik Pesona (Stain of Enchantment) is the third studio album by Indonesian singer, Chrisye, released in August 1979 by Musica Studios. The album was poorly received, with Chrisye later reflecting that he had undergone second album syndrome.

== Production ==
Percik Pesona was Chrisye's third solo album and his second with Musica Studios. It was produced after the massive success of Chrisye's debut solo album Sabda Alam (Nature's Order) and soon after the death of Amin Widjaja, one of the founders of Musica Studios. Songwriting was handled by Chrisye, Jockie Soerjoprajogo, and Guruh Soekarnoputra. Backing vocals were provided by rising star Rafika Duri. Chrisye, although shocked by Amin's passing and feeling little passion for the music, provided the vocals, mixing pop and jazz; he also hit high notes on "Kehidupanku" ("My Life').

Three drummers played on the album. Chrisye's childhood friend Keenan Nasution played drums on "Kehidupanku", while Jimmy Manopo played drums on "Angkuh" ("Arrogance"); Fariz RM played drums for the rest of the album. The title of the song was decided by a vote.

== Release and reception ==
Percik Pesona was released in 1979, with Chrisye's favourite "Lestariku" ("My Eternity") as its first single. "Dewi Khayal" ("Goddess of Fantasy") and "Angkuh" were later released as further singles. The album was poorly received.

After the failure of the album, Chrisye asked several other artists why Percik Pesona could have bombed so badly. In reply, they said that the failure was doubled. Firstly, new singers with successful first albums often emulate only the positive aspects of the first release, assuming that those are the reason it was successful; they were also under pressure to succeed. In his biography, Chrisye retrospectively suggested that he should have known that the album would do poorly when he felt no passion for it.

Percik Pesona has been reissued twice, once as a CD in 2004 and once as part of the Chrisye Masterpiece Trilogy Limited Edition in 2007.

== Track listing ==
| No. | Title | Writer(s) | Length |
|---|---|---|---|
| 1. | "Kehidupanku" ("My Life") | Fariz RM and Junaedi Salat | 4:49 |
| 2. | "Lestariku" ("My Eternity") | Junaidi Salat | 4:27 |
| 3. | "Percik Pesona" ("Stain of Enchantment") | Yockie Suryoprayogo and Fariz RM | 4:39 |
| 4. | "Dewi Khayal" ("Goddess of Fantasy") | Yockie Suryoprayogo and Fariz RM | 4:47 |
| 5. | "Cakrawala" ("Horizons") | Agus B. | 4:00 |
| 6. | "Dirimu dan Diriku" ("You and I") | Agus B. | 3:54 |
| 7. | "Indahnya Alam" ("The Beauty of Nature") | Agus B. | 3:59 |
| 8. | "Angkuh" ("Arrogance") | Yockie Suryoprayogo and Tamy Lesapura | 4:29 |
| 9. | "Kenang Biru" ("Blue Memories") | Yockie Suryoprayogo and Guruh Soekarnoputra | 4:29 |
| 10. | "Damba di Dada" ("Yearning in My Chest") | Chrisye and Junaedi Salat | 4:31 |
| Total length: | | | 44:42 |
