= Aku Cinta Dia =

Studio album by Chrisye
- Released: February 1986
- Genre: Pop
- Length: 45:20
- Label: Musica Studios
- Producers: Adjie Soetama; Chrisye

Chrisye chronology
Sendiri (1985)	Aku Cinta Dia (1986)	Hip Hip Hura (1986)

Aku Cinta Dia (I Love Her) is a tenth studio album by the Indonesian singer Chrisye, released in February 1986 by Musica Studios. Recorded after the romantic pop album Sendiri (Alone; 1985), the album was Chrisye's first of three collaborations with Adjie Soetama. The titular song was written by Soetama during a jam session at the time of recording. Although Chrisye and the other musicians disliked it, Aciu Widjaja – the head of Musica – insisted that it would be a hit; after recording the song, Chrisye warmed to it. After its release Aku Cinta Dia went on to be Chrisye's most successful solo album to that point, selling a million copies and being certified gold after a period of promotion in which Chrisye was forced to dance. It has been reissued twice, in 2004 and in 2007.

== Production ==
In 1985, Chrisye had recorded the successful album Sendiri (Alone) in collaboration with Addie MS. After the album won a BASF Award, sponsored by the BASF cassette production company in Germany, he decided to record a new album as soon as possible. As music with light beats was then popular, Chrisye decided to replace Sendiri's romantic pop sound with a more upbeat one.

Chrisye approached Adjie Soetama, a composer whom he often met at his brother-in-law Raidy Noor's house, and offered the younger man a chance to arrange this new album. At first thinking that Chrisye was not serious, Soetomo agreed quickly when convinced otherwise. Soetomo wrote or co-wrote six songs for the album, while Guruh Sukarnoputra – who had often collaborated with Chrisye before – wrote one. Dadang S. Munaf, the elder brother of musician Ahmad Dhani, contributed another.

Recording began in late 1985. Soetomo brought in several musicians, including Candra Darusman, and Herman Gelly (acoustic piano), while Noor (guitar) and Addie (keyboard) provided further music. During a jam session, Soetomo played a string of upbeat tones, to which he wrote lyrics immediately. The group played some music for it, but disliked it; Chrisye said that it "sounded like a monkey singing." (Note: Original: "... kayak suara monyet lagi nyanyi ...") Aciu Widjaja, the head of Musica Records, who had caught some of the music, insisted that they play it again. When Widjaja heard the entire song, he insisted that it would be the main single for the album. When the group recorded the song, now entitled "Aku Cinta Dia", the following day, they agreed.

"Aku Cinta Dia" was chosen to become the title of the new album. For the cover, Widjaja insisted that Chrisye evoke a fun atmosphere, to reflect the album's light sound. As such, Chrisye was posed with a model, wearing a white jacket, red pants, and a red bow tie.

== Release and reception ==
Aku Cinta Dia was released in early-1986. For promotion, Alex Hasyim and Guruh helped Chrisye practice choreography – the singer was known to be very stiff – while Chrisye's wife Yanti and her cousin Rini provided a costume; Chrisye reportedly said he looked like "a key chain" during fitting. (Note: Original: "Saya kayak gantungan kunci!") He then was put on numerous television shows, such as Ria Safari. The titular song was released as a single. Three songs from the album, "Aku Cinta Dia", "Hura-Hura", and "Selamat Tinggal Sayang" were translated by Tya as "I Love Her", "Night Out", and "Goodbye My Love". Chrisye performed these on English Program, broadcast on the state television channel TVRI.

Aku Cinta Dia sold a million copies, receiving both a BASF Award and being certified gold. It was his best selling solo album to that point. Chrisye would go on to record two more albums with Soetama: Hip Hip Hura (Hip Hip Hurray; 1986) and Nona Lisa (Miss Lisa; 1987).

Aku Cinta Dia has been reissued twice, once as a CD in 2004 and once as part of the Chrisye Masterpiece Trilogy Limited Edition in 2007. Gita Gutawa, daughter of Chrisye's later collaborator Erwin, covered "Aku Cinta Dia" for her 2009 album Harmoni Cinta (Love's Harmony).

== Track listing ==
No.	Title	Writer(s)	Length
1.	"Aku Cinta Dia" ("I Love Her")	Adjie Soetama	3:43
2.	"Selamat Tinggal Sayang" ("Goodbye My Love")	Chrisye and Adjie Soetama	5:00
3.	"Hura-Hura" ("Night Out")	Chrisye-Adjie Soetomo	4:08
4.	"Nyanyian Rindu" ("Song of Longing")	Chrisye	4:27
5.	"Datanglah" ("Come")	Adjie Soetama	4:15
6.	"Cita-Cita" ("Dreams")	Chrisye and Adjie Soetama	4:05
7.	"Cinta Kita" ("Our Love")	Chrisye and Adjie Soetama	3:25
8.	"Masa Remaja" ("Teenage Years")	Chrisye and Adjie Soetama	4:25
9.	"Tiada Lagi Duka" ("No Longer Any Grief")	Chrisye and Adjie Soetama	3:09
10.	"Bunda Tercinta" ("Beloved Mother")	Chrisye and Adjie Soetama	4:12
11.	"Merdeka Menari" ("Free and Dancing")	Guruh Sukarnoputra	4:46
Total length:			45:20
