= Tohpati =

Indonesian jazz guitarist and songwriter (born 1971)

- Born: Tohpati Ario Hutomo; 25 July 1971 (age 55); Jakarta, Indonesia
- Genres: Jazz rock, pop rock
- Occupation: Musician
- Instrument: Guitar
- Years active: (1993 –present)
- Labels: Simak Dialog, Solo, Moonjune
- Website: www.tohpati.com

Tohpati Ario Hutomo (born 25 July 1971) is an Indonesian guitarist, songwriter, and composer. He is known as one of the most notable jazz guitarists in Indonesia. He has collaborated with many Indonesian musicians such as Glenn Fredly, Indro, Arie Ayunir and Shakila. Many of his work has traditional culture elements as he always try to combine both modern and traditional Indonesian music on his albums. The influence came from many different international jazz guitarists, but the most significant influence came from Pat Metheny.

== Music career ==
=== Earlier experiences ===
In his early age, Tohpati was already interested in becoming a musician and often played on many shows around Jakarta, although it was not as a professional career. As a result of his effort, he had won the title "Best Guitarist" at a band festival in Jakarta when he was 14 years old. Four years after that, in 1989, he won another notable award of the best guitarist in Java, also was given at a band festival. This award then contributed a major part in Tohpati's music experience as his name began to be noticed because in the same year, he won another best guitarist title at a "Yamaha Band Explosion" show, which was a national show.

=== Professional career ===
After winning a series of awards, Tohpati decided to begin his professional career. His professional career began in 1993 when he joined a band called simakDialog with Riza Arshad, Arie Ayunir and Indro. Indro is a bassist who played the "Bass Heroes" show in Jakarta. Later, Indro often played with Tohpati in many different shows. With Simak Dialog, Tohpati had released 3 albums, which were Lukisan, Baur and Trance/Mission.

In the late 1990s, Tohpati decided to start a solo career and released his first solo album in 1998. The album also includes a collaboration with Shakila and Glenn Fredly, both pop singers.

His second album, Serampang Samba offered more instrumental hits. Quite different with the last album, Tohpati only included one song with vocals on the album, titled Jejak Langkah Yang Kau Tinggal. This was also the only song with a video clip. Serampang Samba also consists of more traditional Indonesian music with more acoustic guitars and Balinese elements. It can be said that this album is more idealist and progressive compared to his last album.

Since 2007, simakDialog signed to the New York-based progressive/fusion label Moonjune Records and released internationally three albums so far, namely Patahan (live), Demi Masa and The 6th Story. Tohpati also released two albums on Moonjune as a bandleader. Tohpati Ethnomission's Save The Planet is his yet further exploration of the experimental jazz fusion, while his power trio Tohpati Bertiga mixes that with a touch of progressive metal.

== Equipment ==
Tohpati mainly uses his Fender Stratocaster for recording and live performances. However, he has changed the pickups of the guitar, which are Seymour Duncan and DiMarzio X2N. Other guitars that he uses are Sadowsky and Takamine. The guitars are connected to Rocktron effects then to a Mesa Boogie amplifier.

== Discography ==
As a leader

- Tohpati (1998)
- Serampang Samba (2002)
- It's Time
- Song For You
- Tribal Dance (2014)
- Guitar Fantasy

With Tohpati Ethnomission

- Save The Planet (2010)
- Mata Hati (2017)

With simakDialog (sD)

- Lukisan
- Baur
- Trance/Mission (2002)
- Patahan (2007)
- Demi Masa (2009)
- The 6th Story (2013)

With Tohpati Bertiga

- Riot (2012)
- Faces (2017)
