= James F. Sundah =

Indonesian songwriter and composer (1955–2026)

- Born: James Freddy Sundah; 1 December 1955; Semarang, Central Java, Indonesia
- Origin: Manado, North Celebes, Indonesia
- Died: 7 May 2026 (aged 70) New York City, U.S.
- Genres: Pop; rock; contemporary
- Occupations: Songwriter; composer; arranger; record producer
- Instruments: Guitar; keyboards; synthesizers
- Years active: 1977–2026

Ir. James Freddy Sundah (1 December 1955 – 7 May 2026) was an Indonesian songwriter of Minahasa descent. A prominent figure in the Indonesian music industry, Sundah is best known for his evergreen song "Lilin Lilin Kecil" (Little Candles), sung by Chrisye (released in 1977), which won the "Listeners' Favorite Choice" Award from the prominent Prambors Rasisonia Radio in Jakarta.

== Career ==
Sundah's musical career began at a very young age. His father, Alfred Sundah, is known as one of the most important cultural figures in North Sulawesi especially for his efforts to preserving Kolintang and bamboo music. He began playing for his father's recordings at the age of 8.

In 1977, Sundah got his breakthrough for winning the "Listeners' Favorite Choice" Award in the Youth Songwriting Competition (Lomba Cipta Lagu Remaja – LCLR) hosted by Prambors Radio. The competition and the song are often credited as the turning point of the pop era in the Indonesian music industry. "Lilin-lilin Kecil" was on top of the Indonesian charts for more than one year and sent Chrisye to prominence. In the late 1970s, Sundah collaborated with Yockie Soerjoprajogo on Jurang Pemisah (The Severing Abyss). The album is considered a collectible and a high value item for Indonesian collectors.

He is credited with discovering the talents of Vina Panduwinata, Ruth Sahanaya, Krisdayanti, all of whom are considered Indonesian divas. He has worked with a wide range of musicians throughout his career including Vina Panduwinata, January Christy, Sheila Majid (Malaysian), Ismi Azis, Fairuz Hussein (Malaysian), Blue Diamond (Dutch), Victor Wood (Philippines), Ruth Sahanaya, Krisdayanti, Chrisye, Yockie Soerjoprajogo, Erwin Gutawa, and many others. Sundah was instrumental in the formation of the group Suara Persaudaraan (Voices of Brotherhood) in 1986, which, according to a Rolling Stones article, is considered as the largest "jamboree" of musicians of all times. Sundah participated in Pacific Harmony in 1995, and collaborated with artists from the US and Europe including Lois Walden and Cathy Dennis. With Titiek Puspa, Ahmad Albar, Bimbim Slank, Nicky Astria, Iwan Fals, Doel Sumbang, Franky Sahilatua and the Scorpions, he wrote "When You Came Into My Life", on their 1996 album Pure Instinct. The song was later re-released as a Single and was produced by the award-winning producer David Foster.

== Activism ==
"No Song, No Music Industry," is one of Sundah's most popular quotes that have been published by numerous media. A staunch advocate against piracy, Sundah was Chair of Information Technology Department at the Indonesian Association of Singers, Songwriters and Arrangers (PAPPRI), Indonesia's musician union. He is also known as an expert on cultural issues, often wrote, and represented Indonesia in various forums abroad.

In Solo International Ethnic Music 2007, he introduced the concept of "Generasi Edan" (Madness Era), marked by the speedy development of technology. E-d-a-n, in Indonesian literally means madness, is a term coined by Rangga Warsita, a famous Javanese poet, predicting the coming of the madness era. Creatively, Sundah broke down "edan" as an abbreviation of Electronic – Digital – Angka-angka (numbers) – New norm, explaining that to remain in tune with the world development today, one must adapt to the "new" things which were considered many years back.

=== Copyright advocacy and final work ===
Sundah was an advocate for copyright protection and royalty systems for songwriters. In 2025, he released “Seribu Tahun Cahaya” (“Thousand Light Years”), a song he had written nearly two decades earlier and dedicated to his wife. According to Sundah, the release was intended to demonstrate how a royalty system could be properly implemented.

The final stages of the song’s production were completed while Sundah was undergoing cancer treatment, after the work had been registered for copyright protection in the United States. “Seribu Tahun Cahaya” was released simultaneously in Indonesian, English, and Japanese and received recognition from the Indonesian World Records Museum.

== Personal life and death ==
Sundah was married to Lia Sundah Suntoso and had one child. He made international headlines in 2009 when he had to re-take his driver's license exam three times because he refused to pay bribes to the officials to get his lost copy replaced. He lived in New York City with his family until his death on 7 May 2026, at the age of 70 and was buried at St. John’s Cemetery in Queens, New York.

== Legacy ==
Following Sundah’s death, the James F. Sundah Foundation was established in New York, United States, to preserve his works, ideas, and the values he advocated. In collaboration with the Indonesian Institute of the Arts Yogyakarta, the foundation supports education and research in music, copyright, royalty systems, and creators’ economic rights.

== Awards and honors ==
In addition to the "Listeners' Favorite Choice" Award in the Youth Songwriting Competition, Sundah won several BASF Awards, which is the highest award in Indonesian music, most notably for his work with Voices of Brotherhood, Ruth Sahanaya, and Krisdayanti. In 1996, Sundah's signature song "Little Candles" was chosen as the theme song of the International AIDS Memorial celebration in Indonesia. In 2002, Minoru Endo Music Foundation in Japan selected "Little Candles" as one of South East Asian evergreen songs.

In 2025, Sundah received the Lifetime Achievement Award at the Anugerah Musik Indonesia Awards in recognition of his contributions to Indonesian music. The same year, he released “Seribu Tahun Cahaya” (“Thousand Light Years”), a song dedicated to his wife and, according to Sundah, intended to demonstrate the implementation of copyright and royalty systems. The song received recognition from the Indonesian World Records Museum for its simultaneous release in Indonesian, English, and Japanese across three continents.

== Discography ==
- Lilin-lilin Kecil (1977)
- Jurang Pemisah (1979)
- Citra Biru (1980)
- Citra Pesona (1982)
- Melayang (1986)
- Suara Persaudaraan (1986) - a collaborative project featuring 75 artists
- Ozon (1989)
- Basa-Basi (1990)
- OST Catatan Si Emon (1991)
- Tak Kuduga (1989)
- Legenda (1990, re-released 2009)
- The Slow Collections (1990)
- Indonesian Top Ten (1990)
- Kisah Cinta Kita (1991)
- Pure Instinct (1996)
- Bubbles of Love (2012)
- STOP! (2017) - a collaborative project featuring 52 artists
- Seribu Tahun Cahaya (2025).

And many others.
