= Pergilah Kasih =

Studio album by Chrisye
- Released: March 1991
- Genre: Pop
- Length: 37:31
- Label: Musica Studios
- Producer: Younky Suwarno

Chrisye chronology
Jumpa Pertama (1988)	Pergilah Kasih (1991)	Cintamu Telah Berlalu (1992)

Pergilah Kasih (Go Away Dear) is a fourteenth studio album by Indonesian singer, Chrisye, released in 1991 by Musica Studios. Recorded with much input from Younky Suwarno, the album, which have a similar romantic and melancholic beats as his previous albums, was well received and certified silver. Two singles were released from the album.

== Recording ==
Following the success of Jumpa Pertama (1988), Chrisye continued his collaboration with Younky Suwarno and began working on the material for Pergilah Kasih, with Suwarno serves as the producer and handles the arrangement. Chrisye composed four songs in the album, while Tito Sumarsono composed another two and each one composed by Rina R.D. and Doty & Dame respectively. In his biography, he recalled that the album, had a "beautiful touch". (Note: Original: "... sentuhan rasa yang indah.")

== Release and reception ==
The album was released in 1989. Two songs in the album, "Pergilah Kasih" and "Maafkanlah" were released as singles. The album's title track and first single, "Pergilah Kasih", was to be made as Chrisye's first music video. Directed by Jay Subyakto, the video was the first Indonesian song to be shown on MTV Southeast Asia, which was based in Hong Kong at that time. Its second single, "Maafkanlah" were also received music videos. Both videos have been aired between 1991 and 1992 on RCTI's musical programme Rocket.

Pergilah Kasih has been reissued twice, once as a CD in 2004 and once as part of the Chrisye Masterpiece Trilogy Limited Edition in 2007.

== Track listing ==
No.	Title	Writer(s)	Length
1.	"Pergilah Kasih" ("Go Away Dear")	Tito Sumarsono	4:01
2.	"Nostalgia Cinta" ("Love Nostalgia")	Chrisye, Rina R.D.	4:41
3.	"Putri" ("Princess")	Chrisye, B.J. Rianto	4:50
4.	"Hari-Hariku" ("My Days")	Chrisye, Pamungkas N.M.	4:58
5.	"Problema" ("Problems")	Rina R.D.	4:52
6.	"Cinta Kita" ("Our Love")	Doty, Dame	3:23
7.	"Swara Hati" ("Voices of the Heart")	Chrisye, Tommy, Marie	4:42
8.	"Maafkanlah" ("Forgive Me")	Tito Sumarsono, Yuke N.S.	5:35
Total length:			37:31
