= Kala Cinta Menggoda =

Studio album by Chrisye
- Released: November 1997
- Recorded: 1996–1997
- Genre: Pop
- Length: 52:57
- Label: Musica Studios
- Producer: Erwin Gutawa

Chrisye chronology
AkustiChrisye (1996)	Kala Cinta Menggoda (1997)	Badai Pasti Berlalu (1999)

Kala Cinta Menggoda (English: When Love Tempts) is a seventeenth studio album by the Indonesian singer Chrisye, released in November 1997 by Musica Studios. Produced by Erwin Gutawa, who handling the arrangement, it received numerous awards, including two Anugerah Musik Indonesia Awards, in 1998; the music video for the title track won the Asia Viewer's Choice Award that same year. The album was also recorded and released by Chrisye prior to his death, 10 years later.

== Production ==
Kala Cinta Menggoda was recorded by Chrisye, with Erwin Gutawa handling the arrangement. Like his 1996 album AkustiChrisye, the album also utilising acoustic music and uses Australian orchestra.

"Ketika Tangan dan Kaki Berkata", one of the album's 10 tracks, was based on the Islamic view of the Last Judgment and verse 65 of Surah Ya Sin, which reads:

"Today we shall seal the mouths of the infidels, and their hands will speak to us, and their feet will bear witness to what (evils) they used to earn."

The lyrics were written by Taufik Ismail after Chrisye asked him to write lyrics to go with a melody he had written. The recording of "Ketika Tangan dan Kaki Berkata", the last song recorded for the album, required numerous takes because Chrisye would break down in tears after singing a couple of lines. Eventually, Chrisye was able to finish one take the day before he left for Australia. He later wrote that it was one of the most important songs he had ever sung, but he could not sing or listen to it again; he called his emotions in the song the most "sincere" he had ever had while singing.

== Track listing ==
No.	Title	Writer(s)	Length
1.	"Untukku" ("For Me")	Yovie Widianto	4:19
2.	"Kala Cinta Menggoda" ("When Love Tempts")	Guruh Sukarnoputra	5:28
3.	"Kembalilah" ("Return")	Tito Soemarsono	6:37
4.	"Kalimantan"	Guruh Sukarnoputra	5:42
5.	"Mawar Merah" ("Red Rose")	Budi Bidhun	4:26
6.	"Ketika Tangan dan Kaki Berkata" ("When Hands and Feet Speak")	Taufik Ismail and Chrisye	4:21
7.	"Sahabat" ("Friend")	Chrisye and Rina RD	5:14
8.	"Kan Berlalu" ("Will Pass")	Base Jam	6:27
9.	"Gelap Kan Sirna" ("The Darkness Will Disappear")	Tohpati and Elena Zachnas	4:53
10.	"Negeriku" ("My Country")	Chrisye, Rina RD and Yanti Noer	5:33
Total length:			52:57

== Release and reception ==
Kala Cinta Menggoda was released in November 1997. Three music videos were produced for the album, for the songs "Ketika Tangan dan Kaki Berkata", "Untukku", and the title track. Both explicitly referenced Javanese culture, with young, rich urbanites wearing Javanese-style masks in "Kala Cinta Menggoda" and Javanese wayang kulit and court dancers in "Untukku".

The album was well-received, leading to Chrisye being voted Indonesia's "Most Wanted Male Singer" of 1998. Chrisye said that he was glad that people still liked his song. The music video for "Kala Cinta Menggoda" won the Asia Viewer's Choice Award in the 1998 MTV Video Music Awards. It also won two prizes at the 1998 Anugerah Musik Indonesia Awards, for Best Album and Best Producer.

Kala Cinta Menggoda has been reissued twice, once as a CD in 2004 and once as part of the Chrisye Masterpiece Trilogy Limited Edition in 2007. Kala Cinta Menggoda was also the album that Chrisye recorded and released before his death from lung cancer, ten years later. Gita Gutawa, daughter of Chrisye's collaborator Erwin, covered "Ketika Tangan dan Kaki Berkata" for her 2010 album Balada Shalawat.
