= Dekade =

Studio album by Chrisye
- Released: 8 August 2002
- Genre: Pop
- Length: 41:13
- Label: Musica Studios
- Producers: Erwin Gutawa; Indrawati Widjaja

Chrisye chronology
Konser Tur 2001 (2001)	Dekade (2002)	Senyawa (2004)

Dekade ([dəˈkadə]; Decade) is the nineteenth studio album by Indonesian singer, Chrisye, released on 8 August 2002 by Musica Studios. The album, which is also his only cover album, contains rearrangements of older Indonesian songs that spanned six decades, from 1940 to 2002.

== Creation ==
The idea for Dekade came when Chrisye thought about previously popular songs that were later forgotten. Believing that all genres of modern music draw inspiration from the past, he spoke with Erwin Gutawa, who agreed that they should make a tribute to the history of Indonesian pop music. They worked together to find songs that they could obtain the rights to use and that matched Chrisye's timbre.

Eventually, they decided on "Kr. Pasar Gambir dan Stambul Anak Jampang" to represent the 1940s, "Di Bawah Sinar Bulan Purnama" to represent the 1950s, "Dara Manisku" to represent the 1960s, "Anggrek Bulan" and "Pengalaman Pertama" to represent the 1970s, "Kisah Kasih di Sekolah" and "Sakura dalam Pelukan" to represent the 1980s, "Kangen" to represent the 1990s, and "Seperti Yang Kau Minta" to represent the 2000s. The songs that were chosen originated from a variety of genres, including kroncong, rock and roll, pop, and dangdut.

Upon Chrisye's request, Musica Studios approached Sophia Latjuba to be his duet partner. According to Chrisye, he chose her for her "unique" voice. Although Sophia Latjuba was surprised to be asked and was under contract to a different label, she accepted.

Chrisye and Sophia Latjuba recorded their vocals in Musica Studios' studio in Jakarta, while the Allan Eaton Orchestra recorded the music in their studio in Melbourne, Australia. Arrangement was done by Erwin Gutawa. Work also took place at Sing-Sing Studio in Melbourne and 301 Studio in Sydney. All told, over fifty people worked on the album.

== Track listing ==
No.	Title	Writer(s)	Original artist(s)	Length
1.	"Kangen" ("Longing", ft. Sophia Latjuba)	Ahmad Dhani	Dewa 19	5:08
2.	"Sakura Dalam Pelukan" ("Sakura Held Tight")	Fariz RM	Fariz RM	5:09
3.	"Kisah Kasih di Sekolah" ("A School Love Story")	Obbie Messakh	Obbie Messakh	4:44
4.	"Pengalaman Pertama" ("First Experience")	A. Rafiq	A. Rafiq	4:14
5.	"Kr. Pasar Gambir dan Stambul Anak Jampang" ("Kroncong of Gambir Market and Stambul of the Cowlicked Child ")	Ismail Marzuki	Ismail Marzuki	4:42
6.	"Anggrek Bulan" ("Moon Orchid", ft. Sophia Latjuba)	A. Riyanto	A. Riyanto	4:03
7.	"Dara Manisku" ("My Sweet Maiden")	Tonny Koeswoyo	Koes Bersaudara	3:37
8.	"Di Bawah Sinar Bulan Purnama" ("Under the Light of the Full Moon")	R. Maladi	R. Maladi	4:36
9.	"Seperti Yang Kau Minta" ("As You Wish")	Pongky	Jikustik	4:46
Total length:				41:13

== Reception ==
Dekade was well received, selling over 300,000 copies and being certified double platinum on Chrisye's 54th birthday. By October 2003 it had sold 350,000 copies.

Music videos were released for four songs, including both songs featuring Sophia Latjuba: "Seperti Yang Kau Minta", "Kisah Kasih di Sekolah", "Kangen", and "Anggrek Bulan".

Chrisye followed the release of Dekade with a concert at Plenary Hall in Jakarta in 2003. Tickets sold out and the audience numbered several thousand. The sound was handled by Danesh Item, Pardi, Doni Lamuri, Rudra, Edy Jacobus, Lucas Harnadi, and Niki Hirio.

Dekade has been reissued twice, once as a CD in 2004 and once as part of the Chrisye Masterpiece Trilogy Limited Edition in 2007.
