= Sabda Alam =

Studio album by Chrisye
- Released: January 1978
- Recorded: April–August 1977
- Genre: Pop
- Length: 44:55
- Label: Musica Studios
- Producers: Jockie Soerjoprajogo; Chrisye

Chrisye chronology
Jurang Pemisah (1977)	Sabda Alam (1978)	Percik Pesona (1979)

Sabda Alam (Nature's Order) is the second studio album by Indonesian singer, Chrisye, released in January 1978 by Musica Studios. It was his first studio album with Musica after having previously been signed to Pramaqua Records. The album was written in collaboration with Guruh Sukarnoputra. It was well-received, and in 2007, was listed by Rolling Stone Indonesia as one of the 150 best Indonesian albums of all time. The album also received its first official vinyl release in 2022, to mark the 15th anniversary of Chrisye's death.

== Production ==
After the success of Badai Pasti Berlalu, Chrisye was approached by Amin Wijaya of Musica Studios and offered a chance to record an album. Chrisye agreed upon the condition that he would be given creative freedom. Musica agreed to those conditions. Chrisye later recalled receiving much support from Amin during the recording of Sabda Alam.

Sabda Alam was recorded in Musica's studios in Jakarta, Indonesia using double tracking. It featured Chrisye on vocals, guitar, and bass, Jockie Soerjoprajogo on acoustic piano and keyboard, and Keenan Nasution on drums and percussion, with arrangement by Chrisye and Yockie. Guruh Sukarnoputra, who previously collaborated with Chrisye on Guruh Gipsy, contributed three songs.

The songs were written and produced in a similar style as Badai Pasti Berlalu, with romantic and melancholic songs. Recording took place from morning until night; Chrisye eventually fell ill from the effort. During the recording, executives from Musica were not allowed to enter, even though they requested it often.

'Kala Sang Surya Tenggelam', a song written by Guruh Sukarnoputra, was quite popular among many people because of its beautiful lyrics and melody.

== Track listing ==
No.	Title	Lyrics	Music	Length
1.	"Juwita" ("Beautiful")	Junaedi Salat	Yockie Suryoprayogo and Chrisye	5:20
2.	"Sabda Alam" ("Nature's Order")	Junaedi Salat	Chrisye	4:51
3.	"Smaradhana" ("Passion")	Guruh Sukarnoputra	Guruh Sukarnoputra	3:39
4.	"Duka Sang Bahaduri" ("The Noble's Sorrow")	Junaedi Salat	Yockie Suryoprayogo	4:30
5.	"Cita Secinta" ("Longing for a Love")	Junaedi Salat	Yockie Suryoprayogo and Chrisye	4:17
6.	"Kala Sang Surya Tenggelam" ("When the Sun Set")	Guruh Sukarnoputra	Guruh Sukarnoputra	3:32
7.	"Nada Asmara" ("Tones of Passion")	Yockie Suryoprayogo and Junaedi Salat	Yockie Suryoprayogo	5:48
8.	"Citra Hitam" ("Black Image")	Junaedi Salat	Yockie Suryoprayogo and Chrisye	5:31
9.	"Adakah" ("Is There?")	Christ and Tommy	Christ and Tommy	3:59
10.	"Anak Jalanan" ("Street Children")	Guruh Sukarnoputra	Guruh Sukarnoputra	4:03
Total length:				44:55

== Reception ==
Originally scheduled to be released in August 1977, Sabda Alam was officially released in January 1978. It was well-received upon release and sold well. Two songs were released as singles, namely the title track and "Juwita". In 2007, Rolling Stone Indonesia listed Sabda Alam as the 51st best Indonesian album of all time, and in 2009 they selected "Anak Jalanan" as the 72nd best Indonesian song of all time.

== Reissues ==
Sabda Alam has been reissued twice, once as a CD in 2004 and once as part of the Chrisye Masterpiece Trilogy Limited Edition in 2007. It also have been released in a vinyl to mark 15th anniversary of Chrisye's death on 30 March 2022.
