= Jurang Pemisah =

Studio album by Yockie Suryoprayogo and Chrisye
- Released: 17 April 1977
- Recorded: 1977
- Studio: Irama Mas
- Genres: Pop rock, progressive rock
- Length: 39:17
- Label: Pramaqua Records
- Producer: Yockie Suryoprayogo

Jurang Pemisah ([ˈdʒuraŋ pəˈmisah]; Dividing Canyon) is a studio album by Indonesian musician Yockie Suryoprayogo and debut studio album by Indonesian singer Chrisye. It was released on 17 April 1977 by Pramaqua Records.

== Background ==
After the success of Guruh Gipsy and "Lilin-Lilin Kecil", Chrisye was approached by Pramaqua records in 1977. They offered him a chance to record his first studio album. Working with Yockie Suryoprayogo, he recorded Jurang Pemisah. Chrisye performed the vocals on seven songs and played the bass, Jockie played the keyboard, guitar, and drums, and provided vocals on three. Ian Antono and Teddy Sujaya played the guitar and drums respectively for the songs "Mesin Kota" ("Machines in the City") and "Dia" ("Her").

According to Yockie, Jurang Pemisah was "a portrait of social reality", dealing with themes such as the environment and politics. The eponymous song, for example, was about class discrimination causing a divide between the different social strata. Another, "Jeritan Sebrang" ("Shriek from the Other Side") was considered a portrait of supporters of the Republic of South Maluku. Yockie took inspiration from and blended elements of Rick Wakeman and Jon Lord to create and arrange the album.

The album was released that same year with "high hopes", with the songs "Jurang Pemisah" ("Dividing Canyon") and "Jeritan Seberang" planned to become singles. However, sales were lackluster. In his biography, Chrisye commented that Jurang Pemisah sold "like chicken shit"; warm at the beginning, but cooling off quickly. It did not receive any critical praise upon release.

== Track listing ==
No.	Title	Length
1.	"Jeritan Seberang" ("Shriek from the Other Side")	3:46
2.	"Jurang Pemisah" ("Dividing Canyon")	9:06
3.	"Sirna" ("Disappeared")	4:31
4.	"Mesin Kota" ("Machines in the City")	3:58
5.	"Putri Malam" ("Night Princess")	5:00
6.	"Dendam" ("Revenge")	2:32
7.	"Gerutu Menggerutu" ("Grumbling Roughly")	2:54
8.	"Harapan" ("Hope")	3:16
9.	"Dia" ("Her")	4:13
Total length:		39:17

== Notes ==
1. Original: "... Jurang Pemisah, yang masih hangat-hangat tahi ayam."
