= Junaedi Salat =

Indonesian actor and songwriter (1950–2021)

- Born: 2 September 1950; Lampung
- Died: 18 January 2021 (aged 70); Jakarta, Indonesia
- Occupations: Actor, songwriter, christian minister
- Years active: 1972–1994
- Spouse: Mauli Sondang S.

Junaedi Salat (2 September 1950 – 18 January 2021) was an Indonesian film actor and songwriter who gained popularity in the 1970s and 1980s. He is most known for acting as Ali Topan in Ali Topan Anak Jalanan.

== Personal life ==
Junaedi Salat was born in Lampung on 2 September 1950. After graduating from junior high school, Salat moved to Jakarta to continue his high school education. He worked as a warehouse guard near Ismail Marzuki Park while attending school.

Salat, then a Muslim, married Mauli Sondang S., a Christian of Batak ethnicity. Their marriage was marked by frequent quarrels due to his drug addiction. Salat eventually overcame his addiction, converted to Christianity in 1984, and became a minister until his death.

== Career ==
On 1972, Salat was offered by Rahayu Effendi as a lead role in Aku Tak Berdosa, where Dewi Puspa also starred in. He later received an offer to star in a film titled Susana on 1974 with co-star Yenny Rachman. However, one of the most successful films Salat ever starred in was Ali Topan Anak Jalanan, a movie based on a novel by Teguh Esha. In that film, he acted alongside Yati Octavia; he portrayed Ali Topan, a teenager from a broken family who still strives to do the right thing.

In addition to his acting career, Salat also wrote and composed a number of songs. He wrote Kemelut, a song placed first on the Lomba Cipta Lagu Remaja 1978 competition; the compilation album of the same name was considered as the third best Indonesian album of all time by a Rolling Stone Indonesia 2007 list. Together with Jockie S and Chrisye, he created a number of songs for albums such as Sabda Alam and Percik Pesona.

== Death ==
Junaedi Salat died on 18 January 2021 at Cikini Hospital in Jakarta due to diabetes. He had been receiving treatment for the illness since December 2020. Although his condition had briefly improved, it worsened again a few days before his death.

== Filmography ==
=== Film ===
Acting roles
Year	Title	Role	Notes
1972	Aku Tak Berdosa	Dirman	
1974	Susana	Nurdin	
1975	Pacar Pilihan	Hartono	
1977	Ali Topan Anak Jalanan	Ali Topan	
1978	Modal Dengkul Kaya Raya	Indra	
1978	Puber	Ronald	
1979	Colak-colek		
1979	Gadis Kampus	Agus	
1979	Remaja di Lampu Merah		
1979	Mencari Cinta		
1979	Gita Cinta dari SMA		
1979	Di Ujung Malam		
1980	Hallo Sayang		
1980	Jangan Sakiti Hatinya	Benny	
1980	Masih Adakah Cinta	Deni	
1981	Fajar yang Kelabu	Andi	
1981	Bukan Impian Semusim		
1981	Hidup Tanpa Kehormatan		
1981	Bunga Cinta Kasih	Idrus	

Non-acting roles
Year	Title	Role	Notes
1978	Puber	As music composer	
1979	Gadis Kampus	As music composer	
1980	Masih Adakah Cinta	As music composer	
1981	Betapa Damai Hati Kami	As music composer	
1981	Simphony yang Indah	As music composer	

== Discography ==
=== Album ===
- Burung Camar – produced by Lolypop Record. Songs written by Salat: "Hanya untuk Dikau", "Asmara", "Pagi yang Sendu", "Aku", "Mimpi", "Titik-titik Terang", "Si Ochi"
- Joni Teler – produced Records. Songs written by Salat: "Tato", "Sepi", "Maimunah", "Dia yang Mempesona", "Apalagi", "Cinta Abadi", "Nostalgia Alfons", "Apa Adanya", "Kasih", "Masa Remaja".
- Gilang Indonesia Gemilang (from Guruh Soekarnoputra) as arranger.

=== Songs ===
- "Masa-masaku Dahulu" on Vonny Sumlang's album.
- "Lestariku", "Dewi Khayal" and "Damba di Dada" on Percik Pesona, Chrisye's album
- "Ngeceng" and "Mesra" on Cemas, Emerald's album
- "Surat Cinta" on the compilation album Kumpulan Artis Beken
- "Aku Menunggu" on JRS, Ratna Juwita's album (Harpa Records)
- "Dambaanku Lukisan Dewata" – duet with Guruh Soekarno Putra
- "Berdoa dan Berkerja" on the 12 lagu terbaik dalam Lomba Lagu Pembangunan 1987 album, sung by Trisakti University Choir
- "Seperti Bejana"
- "Kau dan Aku"
- "Doa"
- "Gema Nada Cinta"
- "Juwita", co-written with Jockie S., and Chrisye
- "Sabda Alam" on the Sabda Alam album, co-written with Chrisye
- "Duka Sang Bahaduri", co-written with Jockie S.
- "Cita Secinta", co-written with Jockie S. dan Chrisye
- "Nada Asmara", co-written with Jockie S.
- "Lestariku", co-written with Chrisye
- "Citra Hitam", co-written with Jockie S. dan Chrisye
- "Gara-gara", sung by Lydia Kandou
- "Kasih", sung by Malyda
- "Kupu-kupu Malam", sung by Gito Rollies

=== Concerts ===
- Easter Concert 2004, Junaedi Salat with Cendi Luntungan Band.
- 31 Oktober 2007, Junaedi Salat with Jericho in Prisma Sports Club, Kedoya Permai Park, West Jakarta.
