= Alberthiene Endah =

Indonesian writer

- Born: 16 September (Note: She has not revealed her age, but Titik Kurniasari in "Alberthiene Endah: Life, She wrote" (The Jakarta Post) estimates she is in her 30s (as of November 2009).); Bandung, West Java, Indonesia
- Occupations: Novelist; biographer; journalist
- Writing career
- Period: 1993–present

Rr. Alberthiene Endah Kusumawardhani Hilaul-Sutoyo (16 September), better known as Alberthiene Endah, is an Indonesian biographer, novelist, and journalist. She is known for her in-depth biographies of Indonesian celebrities, such as Chrisye and Krisdayanti. She has been called "the most sought after biographer in [Indonesia]."

== Biography ==
Endah was born in Bandung, West Java, but grew up in Depok. She was interested in writing from a young age, and decided to become a journalist while in junior high school. Upon graduating senior high school she majored in Dutch literature at Universitas Indonesia.

Endah received her first job working for the magazine Hidup in 1993. In 1996, she started at the women's magazine Femina. While working at Femina, Endah interviewed many people, among them Jennifer Lopez, Xanana Gusmão, and Krisdayanti, who asked her to write her biography. That biography was released in 2003 under the title Seribu Satu KD.

In 2004, Endah resigned from her position at Femina to focus on her career as a freelance writer and lead the editorial board at Prodo magazine. During this time, she was approached by several public figures and asked to write their biography.

She also released her first novel, Don't Give Me Drugs (Indonesian: Jangan Beri Aku Narkoba), in 2004. Don't Give Me Drugs received an award from the Indonesian National Narcotics Agency for her "effort in combating drugs" and first place at the 2005 Adikarya Awards. In 2005, Don't Give Me Drugs was adapted into the film The Last Second (Indonesian: Detik Terakhir).

Between May and November 2006, Endah worked on writing musician Chrisye's biography while he was battling lung cancer. She has called it her "most special" work and Chrisye's willingness to be interviewed "like a miracle."

In 2010 she announced that she was working on a biography of actress Luna Maya. Endah has stated that she plans on writing a full biography, not just about the star's recent sex tape scandal.

== Personal life ==
Endah is married to Indonesian photographer Dio Hilaul.

When writing biographies, Endah participates in the subjects day-to-day activities. She has called writing biographies "like dating [the subject]", because of the need to be involved in their activities. She has accompanied subjects on tour, in video editing sessions, and during their fight against cancer.

== Bibliography ==
Her works include:

Biographies
Year	Title	Title in English	Notes
2003	Seribu Satu KD	One Thousand and One KDs	First biography
2004	Panggung Hidup Raam Punjabi	Raam Punjabi's Life on the Stage	
2004	Dwi Ria Latifa: Berpolitik dengan Nurani	Politics with a Conscience	
2006	Venna Melinda Guide to Good Living: Bugar dan Cantik ala Venna Melinda	Fit and Beautiful the Venna Melinda Way	
2007	Anne Avantie: Aku, Anugerah dan Kebaya	Me, The Gift and Kebaya	
2007	Chrisye: Sebuah Memoar Musikal	A Musical Memoir	
2008	Titiek Puspa: A Legendary Diva	Titiek Puspa: A Legendary Diva	On Titiek Puspa
2009	Catatan Hati Krisdayanti — My Life, My Secret	Krisdayanti's Memoirs — My Life, My Secret	
2010	Memoar Romantika Probosutedjo : Saya dan Mas Harto	Probosutedjo's Romantic Memoir : Me and My Brother, Harto	
2011	Merry Riana — Mimpi Sejuta Dolar	Merry Riana — A Million Dollar Dream	
2012	Joko Widodo - Menyentuh Jakarta	Joko Widodo - Touching Jakarta	

Novels
Year	Title	Title in English	Notes
2004	Jangan Beri Aku Narkoba	Don't Give Me Drugs	First novel
2004	Cewek Matre	The Material Girl	
2004	Jodoh Monika	Monika's Partner	
2005	Dicintai Jo	Loved by Jo	
2008	Selebriti	Celebrity	
2009	Ojek Cantik	The Beautiful Motorbike Taxi Driver	
2009	Nyonya Jetset	Miss Jetset	
