= Badai Pasti Berlalu (album) =

Soundtrack album by Chrisye and Berlian Hutauruk
- Released: 1977
- Genre: Pop
- Length: 47:01
- Label: Irama Mas

Badai Pasti Berlalu (Indonesian pronunciation: [ˌbadai̯ ˌpast̪i bərˈlalu]; English: The Storm Will Surely Pass) is the soundtrack to the 1977 Indonesian film of the same name. Rolling Stone Indonesia listed it as the best Indonesian album of all time. Three of its songs, the title song, "Merpati Putih", and "Merepih Alam", were listed by Rolling Stone as among the best Indonesian songs ever released.

== Recording ==
After the success of Badai Pasti Berlalu, Eros Djarot and Chrisye were approached by Irama Mas with a request to release the soundtrack as an album, offering to buy it for a flat fee. Although they considered their work on Badai Pasti Berlalu over and were already considering their next project, they agreed.

Badai Pasti Berlalu was recorded in Pluit, Jakarta in a period of 21 days, led by composer Eros Djarot. The vocals were covered by Chrisye (who also played the bass) and Berlian Hutauruk, with Fariz Rustam Munaf and Keenan Nasution on the drums, Debby Nasution on the keyboard, and Yockie Suryoprajogo on both the keyboard and drums.

== Track listing ==
Side 1
No.	Title	Writer(s)	Singer	Length
1.	"Pelangi" ("Rainbow")	Eros Djarot & Debby Nasution	Chrisye	2:30
2.	"Merpati Putih" ("White Dove")	Eros Djarot & Yockie Soerjoprajogo	Chrisye	2:57
3.	"Matahari" ("Sun")	Eros Djarot & Yockie Soerjoprajogo	Berlian Hutauruk	3:25
4.	"Serasa" ("Feels Like")	Eros Djarot & Chrisye	Chrisye	4:41
5.	"Khayalku" ("My Imagination")	Eros Djarot & Debby Nasution	Chrisye & Berlian Hutauruk	3:59
6.	"Angin Malam" ("The Night Wind")	Eros Djarot & Debby Nasution	Chrisye	3:53

Side 2
No.	Title	Writer(s)	Singer	Length
1.	"Merepih Alam" ("Fragile Nature")	Eros Djarot & Chrisye	Chrisye	4:33
2.	"Semusim" ("One Season")	Eros Djarot & Debby Nasution	Chrisye & Berlian Hutauruk	3:20
3.	"Baju Pengantin" ("Wedding Dress")	Eros Djarot & Yockie Soerjoprajogo	Chrisye	3:16
4.	"E & C & Y" ("E & C & Y")	Eros Djarot, Chrisye, & Yockie Soerjoprajogo	Instrumental	3:26
5.	"Cintaku" ("My Love")	Eros Djarot & Debby Nasution	Chrisye	3:56
6.	"Badai Pasti Berlalu" ("The Storm Will Surely Pass")	Eros Djarot & Yockie Soerjoprajogo	Berlian Hutauruk	3:34
7.	"Merpati Putih" ("White Dove")	Eros Djarot & Yockie Soerjoprajogo	Instrumental	2:42

== Release and reception ==
It was released in 1977 with a picture of Badai Pasti Berlalu actress Christine Hakim on the cover. After stagnating for a week, numerous radio stations began playing the singles and sales increased exponentially.

Although it was originally feared that only die-hard fans would buy a film soundtrack album, Badai Pasti Berlalu sold well and was critically acclaimed; it was called "monumental."

== Legacy ==
Badai Pasti Berlalu has been called "the start of Indonesian pop" and "the blueprint for Indonesian pop development". It also convinced Amin Widjaja of Musica Studios to sign Chrisye, launching Chrisye's music career.

Rolling Stone Indonesia listed Badai Pasti Berlalu as the best Indonesian album of all time. Three of the songs included on Badai Pasti Berlalu were listed by Rolling Stone Indonesia as some of the best Indonesian songs of all time. "Badai Pasti Berlalu" was ranked third, "Merpati Putih" was ranked forty-third, and "Merepih Alam" was ranked ninetieth.

=== 1999 remake ===
Badai Pasti Berlalu

Studio album by Chrisye
- Released: 1999
- Genre: Pop
- Length: 53:53
- Label: Musica Studios
- Producer: Erwin Gutawa

Chrisye chronology
Kala Cinta Menggoda (1997)	Badai Pasti Berlalu (1999)	Konser Tur 2001 (2001)

Badai Pasti Berlalu was remade in 1999 by Chrisye, with the songs rearranged by Erwin Gutawa. It cost 800 million Rupiah (US$95,000) to produce and promote, which it made within three months.

No.	Title	Singer	Length
1.	"Cintaku" ("My Love")	Chrisye	4:41
2.	"Merepih Alam" ("Fragile Nature")	Chrisye	4:21
3.	"Semusim" ("One Season")	Chrisye ft. Waldjinah	4:47
4.	"Merpati Putih" ("White Dove")	Chrisye	4:47
5.	"Khayalku" ("My Imagination")	Chrisye ft. Nicky Astria	4:14
6.	"Baju Pengantin" ("Wedding Dress")	Chrisye	4:14
7.	"Serasa" ("It Feels Like")	Chrisye	6:25
8.	"Angin Malam" ("The Night Wind")	Chrisye	4:41
9.	"Pelangi" ("Rainbow")	Chrisye	5:25
10.	"Matahari" ("Sun")	Chrisye ft. Aning Katamsi	4:32
11.	"Badai Pasti Berlalu" ("The Storm Will Surely Pass")	Chrisye	5:28
Total length:			53:53

== Reissues ==
In 2024, Badai Pasti Berlalu was reissued in a vinyl edition, which was released on 25 August.
