= Marten (surname) =

Marten or Märten or Martén is a surname, and may refer to:

- Alfred Marten (1829–1910), English politician and barrister
- Amberson Barrington Marten (1870–1962), British judge in India
- Anna Maria Marten (born 1964), Indonesian model, wife of Roy Marten
- Anthony Marten (c. 1542–1597), English courtier and writer
- Benjamin Marten (c.1690–1752), English physician
- Barbara Marten (born 1947), British actress
- Billie Marten (born 1999), British singer-songwriter and musician
- Cindy Marten, American educator and government official
- Edmund Marten (1688–1751), Dean of Worcester
- Félix Marten (1919–1992), French film actor
- Francis Arthur Marten (1879–1950), Royal Navy officer
- Gading Marten (born 1982), Indonesian actor, presenter and footballer
- George Marten (cricketer, born 1801) (1801–1876), English cricketer
- George Marten (cricketer, born 1840) (1840–1905), English cricketer
- George Marten (priest) (1876–1966), English Anglican priest
- Gibran Marten (born 1987), Indonesian actor and singer
- Grisha Heyliger-Marten (born 1976), Sint Maarten politician
- Günter Marten (1939–2013), German politician
- Helen Marten (born 1985), English artist
- Helen Marten (silent film actor) (born c.1894), American film actor
- Henry Marten (politician) (c. 1562 – 1641), Tudor politician
- Henry Marten (regicide) (1602–1680), his son
- Sir Henry Martin, 2nd Baronet (1768–1842), cricketer
- Henry Marten (educator) (1872–1948), Provost of Eton
- James Marten (born 1984), American football player
- John Marten Cripps (1780–1853), English traveller and antiquarian
- John Thomas Marten (born 1951), American judge
- Kimberly Marten, American author on international security and foreign policy
- Lars Marten (born 1984), German footballer
- Lisa Marten (born 1967), American politician
- Lu Märten (1879–1970), German writer and activist
- Lutz Marten (born 1967), German linguist and Africanist
- Maritza Martén (born 1963), Cuban discus thrower
- Mary Anna Marten (1929–2010), British landowner and archaeologist
- Napier Marten (born 1959), British courtier
- Neil Marten (1916–1985), British politician
- Robert Humphrey Marten (1763–1839), British businessman and reformer
- Roy Marten (born 1952), Indonesian actor
- Steve Marten (born 1948), New Zealand competitive sailor
- Ulrich Marten (born 1956), German tennis player
- William Marten (1845–1907), English cricketer

== See also ==
- Martin (surname)
- Martyn (surname)
- Merten (name)
- Martens (surname)
