= List of Eastern Orthodox Christians =

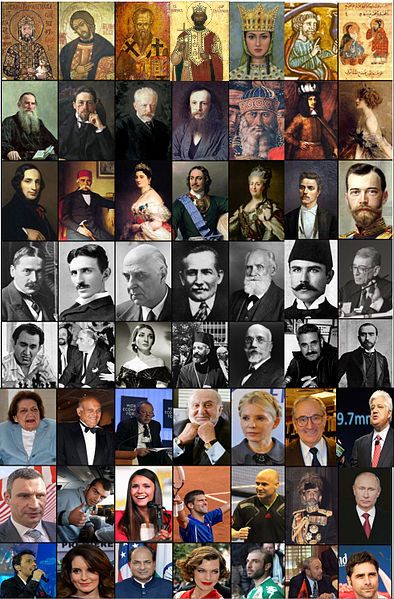
Set of pictures for a number of famous Eastern Orthodox Christians from various fields.

This is primarily a list of notable people who contributed to the history of Eastern Orthodox Christianity's theology or culture. However it is also for people whose Eastern Orthodox identity is an important part of their notability. As there are many nations that are predominantly Eastern Orthodox names from such nations should usually meet a stricter standard, but in the case of converts their conversion might be notable enough to make an exception.

== Artists ==
Attributed to Rublev

- Andrei Rublev – important in the history of Russian iconography
- El Greco – from Crete, noted for Christian art
- Feofan Grek – noted iconographer
- Boris Kustodiev – Russian artist known for depictions of Russian Orthodox people and culture
- Jerzy Nowosielski – famous Polish painter, noted for his numerous works of Byzantine-influenced religious art
- Karl Matzek – convert from Catholicism who did religious art for the faith
- Prokhor of Gorodets – icon painter
- Simon Ushakov – leading religious artist linked to the reforms of Patriarch Nikon
- Valentin Alexandrovich Serov – Russian painter, and one of the premier portrait artists of his era.
- Constantin Brâncuși – Romanian world-renowned sculptor
- Gala Dalí – (Birth name Elena Ivanovna Diakonova Russian: Елена Ивановна Дьяконов), model, wife and muse of Salvador Dalí.

== Entrepreneurs/industrialists ==
- Nikolay Alekseyev
- Igor Sikorsky

== Entertainers ==
- Jennifer Aniston
- Stana Katic
- John Belushi – member of the Albanian Orthodox Church in childhood; his funeral was in that faith
- James Belushi – member of the Albanian Orthodox Church, John's brother.
- Charles Bronson – Russian Orthodox, son of a Kryashen.
- Yul Brynner – actor. His remains were interred in France on the grounds of the Saint-Michel-de-Bois-Aubry Russian Orthodox monastery near Luzé between Tours and Poitiers.
- George Chakiris – contributor to a Greek Orthodox Cathedral
- Michael Chiklis – actor, second generation Greek-American.
- Anna Maria – Indonesian model
- Kira Kazantsev – Miss America 2015
- Vassiliki Betty Cantrell – Greek Orthodox Church Sunday school teacher, Miss America 2016
- Sandra Dee – (birth name: Alexandra Cymboliak Zuck). One time wife of Bobby Darin. Raised Russian Orthodox in New Jersey. Her mother was of Carpathian Russian ancestry.
- Nina Dobrev
- Olympia Dukakis – actress, Greek Orthodox.
- Tina Fey – Greek-American on her mother's side and married in a Greek Orthodox wedding.
- Zach Galifianakis – Baptized at St. Barbara's Greek Orthodox Church in Durham, NC
- Tom Hanks – Converted on marrying Rita Wilson, mention by Saint Sophia Cathedral, Los Angeles.
- Hank Hanegraaff – radio talk host and important figure of Christian countercult movement, Chrismated at St. Nektarios Greek Orthodox Church in Charlotte, NC.
- Jonathan Jackson – actor, convert from Protestant Church
- Andreas Katsulas – actor; Greek Orthodox. Before his passing, he requested that memorials be made to St. Nicholas Greek Orthodox Church, St. Louis, MO.
- Melina Kanakaredes – St. Nicholas's Greek Orthodox Church listed her as a possible speaker, credits the church as helpful to her in youth. Grew up at Annunciation Greek Orthodox Church in Akron, OH
- Angie Katsanevas - Real Housewife of Salt Lake City, mother, wife, businesswoman, pillar of the community
- Elia Kazan – Director, born to Greek parents who immigrated from the Ottoman Empire to the United States
- Emir Kusturica – Serbian Orthodox. Raised in a Bosnian Muslim Family. His conversion gained some media attention.
- Ana Layevska – Ukrainian-born Mexican actress and violinist (of Russian origin)
- Karl Malden (Mladen Sekulovich) – said to have been Serbian Orthodox.
- Constantine Maroulis – Greek Orthodox, brother of Athan Maroulis
- Debbie Matenopoulos
- Maria Menounos – actress, presenter
- Telly Savalas – contributed to Greek Orthodox Cathedrals and his bald image began after playing Pontius Pilate
- Amy Sedaris – American actress, author and comedian
- Shawnee Smith – American actress, Smith is a convert to the Russian Orthodox Church
- John Stamos – American actor
- Nia Vardalos – actress
- Rita Wilson – actress
- Lana Wood (birth name: Svetlana Gurdin, family surname had been changed from Zacharenko four years earlier in 1942) – Russian Orthodox actress; sister of Natalie.
- Natalie Wood (birth name: Natalie Zacharenko, later changed to Gurdin) – Russian Orthodox actress.
- Mahesa Gibran – Indonesian actor
- Cary-Hiroyuki Tagawa – On November 12, 2015, he was baptized as Panteleymon in the Russian Orthodox Joy of All Who Sorrow church in Moscow
- Alla Pugacheva – Russian singer and model

== Musicians and composers ==
- Djuro Zivkovic - a contemporary Serbian-Swedish composer, born 1975 in Belgrade, since 2000 based in Sweden.
- Maksym Berezovsky - Known for religious music
- Dmytro Bortniansky - Religious music.
- John Craton - American classical composer
- George Enescu - Romanian composer
- Bill Evans
- Enca (Ruensa Haxhiaj) - Albanian pop singer
- Alexander Frey - Conductor, pianist, organist and composer, was baptized in the Greek Orthodox church, but is also a practicing Episcopalian.
- Dave Gahan - English lead singer for Depeche Mode, converted to Greek Orthodox Christianity to marry his current wife Jennifer.
- Chris Hillman - original member of The Byrds
- Lena Katina - Member of Russian music group t.A.T.u.
- Boris Ledkovsky - Russian-American composer of Church music
- George Michael - celebrity pop singer, a Greek-Cypriote.
- Dimitris Mitropoulos - Conductor, pianist and composer. Music Director of the New York Philharmonic and the Minneapolis Symphony Orchestra.
- Stevan Stojanović Mokranjac - one of the most famous Serbian composers and music educators of the nineteenth century.
- Ivan Moody - British composer, conductor and Orthodox priest.
- Katie Melua - singer
- Inva Mula - Albanian Orthodox, famous opera singer.
- Arvo Pärt – Estonian composer, known for religious music, convert from Lutheranism
- Georgs Pelēcis – Latvian composer and musicologist.
- Ciprian Porumbescu - Romanian composer
- Tose Proeski - Macedonian pop singer
- Nikolai Rimsky-Korsakov - Possibly atheist after some point, but did Russian Orthodox church music.
- Sergei Rachmaninoff
- Mstislav Rostropovich - Conductor, National Symphony, cellist
- Kurt Sander - American composer who converted to Russian Orthodoxy in 1993. Composer of the first complete English-language setting of the Liturgy of St. John Chrysostom.
- Thomas Simaku - Albanian Orthodox, famous composer
- Trey Spruance - Leader of the multi-genre outfit Secret Chiefs 3
- Igor Stravinsky - Left the faith from 1900 to 1926, after rejoining he did Symphony of Psalms.
- John Tavener - Converted to Orthodoxy, and much of his music is influenced by that.
- Pyotr Ilyich Tchaikovsky - Russian composer of the Romantic era. His wide-ranging output includes symphonies, operas, ballets, instrumental and chamber music and songs
- Julia Volkova - Member of Russian music group t.A.T.u. Previously converted to Islam, but has since returned to Orthodox Christianity.
- Stephen M. Wolownik - Church music early on

== Historians ==
- Florin Curta - professor of medieval history and archaeology, University of Florida, Gainesville, Florida
- Fr. Demetrios Constantelos - professor of history and religious studies, Richard Stockton College, Pomona, New Jersey
- George Pachymeres - Byzantine chief advocate of the church
- Avraamy Palitsyn - Russian historian who died at the Solovetsky Monastery
- Jaroslav Pelikan - professor of ecclesiastical history, Yale University, and a convert from Lutheranism
- Nicephorus Callistus Xanthopoulos - Byzantine ecclesiastical historian
- John Xiphilinus - also a monk
- Joannes Zonaras - also a theologian
- Nikolay Yakovlevich Danilevsky
- Mircea Eliade - famous Romanian writer, philosopher and historian
- Evagrius Scholasticus - 6th century Byzantine historian.
- Sozomen - wrote a history that ended in the year 429 A.D.
- Socrates Scholasticus - wrote a church history that ended in the year 439 A.D, during Theodosius II (or Younger's) reign.
- Saint Theophanes the Confessor - Byzantine Saint, who championed the cause of the Iconodules, who venerate icons. He wrote a 9th-century Byzantine Chronicle.

== Journalists ==
- Saša Petricic - award-winning Serbian Canadian journalist. Since 2011, he has been Middle East correspondent and videojournalist for CBC Television's The National and other CBC News programs.
- Ernie Anastos - New York television anchor
- Thalia Assuras - CBS News anchor
- Alexis Christoforous - CBS News anchor / correspondent
- Chris Clark - retired news anchor, WTVF, Nashville, Tennessee
- Rod Dreher - Dallas Morning News columnist, "Crunchy Con" blog
- Mike Emanuel - Fox News White House Correspondent
- Terry Mattingly - syndicated columnist
- Natalie Jacobson - born Natalie Salatich, television news anchor, WCVB - Boston - Serbian Orthodox
- Serge Schmemann - International Herald Tribune writer/editor
- George Stephanopoulos - ABC News chief Washington correspondent; a former altar boy, and son of a priest.

== Linguists ==
- Nikita Yakovlevich Bichurin - Russian Orthodox Church monk and Sinologist
- Saint Innocent of Alaska - wrote books on Tlingit and worked on an alphabet for Aleut
- Pyotr Kafarov - student of Bichurin, also a Sinologist and ROC monk
- Mateja Matejić - priest in the Serbian Orthodox Church
- Alexander Nedoshivin - Russian Orthodox Church priest and Esperantist
- Epifany Slavinetsky - Polyglot, Russian Orthodox Church monk, and translator
- Roman Jakobson - Structuralist linguist and literary theorist; converted to Orthodoxy in 1975.

== Modern politicians ==
Note: Most political figures in the Byzantine Empire, or most other Medieval Eastern European Empires, would be at least nominally Eastern Orthodox. Therefore, this is limited to modern times, specifically after 1800. For United States entries Political Graveyard was used for this section, but additional sources are encouraged.

The list is not complete; the vast majority of politicians in countries such as Greece, Romania, Cyprus, Russia, Serbia and others are Eastern Orthodox.

=== United States / Canada ===
- Spencer Abraham - former Senator (R-MI) and Energy Secretary
- Justin Amash - former member of Congress (L-MI) (Antiochian Orthodox)
- Eleni Bakopanos - former Canadian Member of Parliament (Lib-PQ)
- Melissa Bean - former member of Congress (D-IL)
- Helen Delich Bentley - former US Congresswoman (R-MD) (Serbian Orthodox)
- Michael Bilirakis - former member of Congress (R-FL) (Greek Orthodox)
- Gus Bilirakis - member of Congress (R-FL) (Greek Orthodox)
- Rod Blagojevich - former Illinois Governor (D) (Serbian Orthodox)
- Tony Clement - former Ontario Minister of Health and federal MP (Cons-ON) (Greek Cypriot)
- Michael Dukakis - former Governor and Presidential candidate (D-MA)
- Nick Galifianakis - former Congressman (D-NC)
- George Gekas - former Congressman (R-PA)
- Ray Hnatyshyn - Governor-General of Canada (1990–1995)
- Michael Huffington - former Congressman and Senatorial candidate (R-CA)
- Johnny Joannou - member of Virginia House of Delegates (D-79)
- Nicole Malliotakis - member of Congress (R-NY), frm. New York State assemblywoman (Greek Orthodox)
- Eleni Kounalakis - lt. Governor of California (D-CA) (Greek Orthodox)
- Nicholas Mavroules - former Congressman (D-MA)
- John Sarbanes - member of Congress (D-MD) (Greek Orthodox)
- Paul Sarbanes - former U.S. Senator (D-MD) (Greek Orthodox)
- Chris Pappas - member of Congress (D-NH) (Greek Orthodox)
- Mary Peltola - member of Congress (D-AK) (Russian Orthodox)
- Andrew S. Shandro - Alberta MLA (Lib)
- Dean Skelos - New York State Senate Majority Leader (R)
- Olympia Snowe - U.S. Senator (R-ME); Attended St. Basil's Academy
- George Tenet - former CIA Director
- Paul Tsongas - late U.S. Senator and Presidential candidate (D-MA)
- John N. Wozniak - member of Pennsylvania Senate (D-35)

=== Europe / Middle East ===
- Michel Aflaq - founder of Baathism
- Miron Cristea - first patriarch of the Romanian Orthodox Church and Prime Minister for about a year
- Constantine Karamanlis - first Prime Minister of the Third Hellenic Republic, Former President of Greece (ND)
- Boris Tadić - former President of Serbia
- Tomislav Nikolić - former President of Serbia
- Aleksandar Vučić - President of Serbia
- Kostas Karamanlis - Prime Minister of Greece (ND)
- Vojislav Koštunica - former Prime Minister of Serbia.
- Leonid Kuchma - former President of Ukraine.
- Makarios III - President of Cyprus
- Dmitry Medvedev - former President of Russia
- Fan S. Noli - Albanian-Orthodox bishop and briefly prime-minister of Albania
- Tassos Papadopoulos - President of Cyprus
- Andreas Papandreou - former Prime Minister of Greece (PASOK)
- Vladimir Putin - President of Russia & Former Prime Minister of Russia
- Fyodor Rtishchev
- Mikhail Saakashvili - Former President of Georgia
- Eduard Shevardnadze - former President of Georgia
- Eleftherios Venizelos - former Prime Minister of Greece
- Viktor Yushchenko - former President of Ukraine
- Constantin Zureiq - early Arab nationalist leader
- Vlad Tepes - 15th-century Wallachian prince of the house of Dracul. He reluctantly converted to Roman Catholicism after months of torture by King Matthias Corvinus of Hungary and Croatia.

== Scientists ==
- Anthemius of Tralles - architect who designed the Hagia Sophia in Constantinople
- Abram Samoilovitch Besicovitch - mathematician
- Nikolay Bogolyubov (1909–1992) - theoretical physicist and mathematician
- Theodosius Dobzhansky - evolutionary biologist
- Pavel Florensky - worked on Dielectrics and theodicy
- Alexander Friedmann - discovered the expanding universe solution to the Einstein field equations
- John Kanzius - raised Russian Orthodox, created an experimental cancer treatment using radio waves and discovered how to use radio frequencies to ignite salt water.
- Sergei Korolev - designed the R-7 rocket which launched the Space Age on October 4, 1957
- Dmitri Mendeleev - chemist and inventor, formulated the Periodic Law
- Josif Pančić - noted botanist, physician, and Orthodox convert
- Georgios Papanikolaou (1883 - 1962) - doctor, gynaecologist, biologist, researcher. Discovered and established the "Pap test" against cancer of female genital organs.
- Ivan Pavlov - his father was a Russian Orthodox priest, and Ivan Pavlov was enrolled in the seminary before reading The Origin of Species
- John Philoponus - "Christian philosopher, scientist, and theologian"
- Alexander Popov - radio pioneer, son of a priest, planned to study in the seminary
- Michael I. Pupin - famous physicist
- Nikola Tesla - inventor, electrical engineer, mechanical engineer, and futurist
- Nicolae Paulescu - Romanian physiologist, professor of medicine, and politician, the discoverer of pancreine
- Victor Babeș - Romanian physician, biologist, and one of the earliest bacteriologists
- Ana Aslan - Romanian biologist and physician who discovered the anti-aging effects of procaine
- Petrache Poenaru - Romanian inventor of the fountain pen
- Henri Coanda - Romanian inventor, aerodynamics pioneer and builder of an experimental aircraft
- Aurel Vlaicu - Romanian engineer, inventor, airplane constructor and early pilot

== Writers/philosophers ==
- Ivo Andrić - Serbian writer, Nobel prize winner
- Nikolai Berdyaev - Russian Orthodox Christian existentialist philosopher
- Metropolitan Anthony (Bloom) of Sourozh - Russian bishop and writer
- Bruce Chatwin - English novelist and travel writer
- Michael Choniates - Byzantine Greek writer and ecclesiastic
- Fyodor Dostoevsky - many of his novels, like The Idiot and The Brothers Karamazov, have specific Russian Orthodox themes
- Jim Forest - American writer, peace activist and lay theologian
- Alexander Galich - Russian Jewish convert who wrote poems and screenplays. (Also joined the National Alliance of Russian Solidarists)
- Nikolai Vasilievich Gogol - considered a father of modern Russian realism.
- David Bentley Hart - American academic philosophical theologian and author
- Ivan Ilyin - Slavophile, wrote Axioms of Religious Experience
- Eugen Ionescu - Romanian writer
- Paul Kingsnorth - English writer who lives in the west of Ireland
- Ivan Kireevsky - often considered the father of Russian and Slavophile philosophy
- Thom Nickels - American author, journalist wrote Philadelphia Architecture and Literary Philadelphia: A History of Prose & Poetry in the City of Brotherly Love.
- Konstantin Pobedonostsev - Russian jurist, statesman, and adviser to three Tsars
- Alexander Sergeyevich Pushkin - Russian author of the Romantic era who is considered by many to be the greatest Russian poet and the founder of modern Russian literature.
- Seraphim Rose - American convert and monastic writer
- Frank Schaeffer - American author and liberal commentator, son of Evangelical apologist and "father of the Christian right" Francis Schaeffer. Frank Schaeffer rejected Reformed Protestant fundamentalism and converted to Orthodoxy in 1992, which he continues to self-identify as.
- Aleksandr Solzhenitsyn - Russian Orthodox author
- Richard Swinburne - British analytic philosopher and convert to Orthodoxy late in life from Anglicanism
- Eugene Vodolazkin - Russian author
- Timothy Ware - English metropolitan bishop and theologian
- Christos Yannaras - Greek philosopher and theologian

== Theologians and clergy ==
- Mother Thekla - Marina Scharfe - Kislovodsk 1918 - 2011
- Gregory the Wonderworker - early bishop of Neocaesarea
- Michael Apostolius
- Basil of Caesarea - one of the Three Holy Hierarchs and a Doctor of the Church in Catholicism
- Gregory of Nyssa - 4th century bishop and brother of the Saint Basil the Great
- Cyril of Alexandria - 5th century Patriarch of Alexandria and the most important defender of Virgin Mary's title as the *Theotokos
- Epiphanius of Salamis - 5th century Saint and Bishop. He wrote the Panarion and other theological works.
- Georges Florovsky
- Saint Maximus the Confessor - saint and monk who lived from 580 to 662 A.D. He defend Dyothelitism and Dyoenergism against Monoenergism, and Monothelitism later.
- Charles Sydney Gibbes - English tutor of the Romanov children.
- Michael Glycas - also a historian and poet
- Spyridon, Bishop of Cyprus - bishop and saint who attended the First Council of Nicea in 325 A.D.
- Saint Athanasius - Patriarch of Alexandria who lived from 296 to 373 A.D. He was once a deacon of *Saint Alexander of Alexandria, who was the former Patriarch of the Patriarchate. Athanasius defended the Homousion Faith and the Council of Nicea against Arianism.
- Thomas Hopko
- Archbishop Iakovos - former Leader of the Greek Orthodox Archdiocese of America
- John of Kronstadt - Archpriest
- Jeremias II - Patriarch of Constantinople
- John of Damascus - 7th-8th century saint and monk. He eventually moved to Mar Saba Monastery in Jerusalem. He wrote "On the Divine Images," to defend the practice of icon veneration against the Byzantine Emperor.
- Saint Theodore the Studite - 8th-9th century Saint and Monk. He wrote On the Holy Icons during the Second Period of Iconoclasm in the Byzantine Empire
- John Chrysostom - one of the Three Holy Hierarchs and a Doctor of the Church in Catholicism
- John of Climacus - Great Hegumen and ascetic who lived on Mount Sinai, in the 6th and 7th centuries, in Saint Catherine's Monastery. He wrote the Ladder of Divine Ascent.
- John of Shanghai and San Francisco
- John of Tobolsk
- Konstantin of Murom
- Father Emmanuel Lemelson - Greek Orthodox priest, hedge fund manager and social activist
- Cyril Lucaris - Crypto-Protestant Patriarch of Constantinople
- John Anthony McGuckin - priest and professor, originally a Latin Catholic, but he converted to the Romanian Orthodoxy.
- Alexander Men
- John Meyendorff
- Metropolitan Gerasimos - Metropolitan Bishop of San Francisco
- Peter Mohyla
- Gregory of Nazianzus - one of the Three Holy Hierarchs and a Doctor of the Church in Catholicism
- Nicholas of Japan
- Gregory Palamas
- Grigol Peradze - Patristics, also a historian
- Maximus Planudes
- Justin Popović
- Nikolaj Velimirović
- Sergius of Radonezh
- Alexander Schmemann
- Gennadius Scholarius
- Victor Sokolov - archpriest and Soviet dissident journalist
- Theophan the Recluse
- Patriarch Tikhon of Moscow - confessor
- Joseph Volotsky - theologian/saint
- Olaf II of Norway - Martyr-King of Norway, brought Christianity to Scandinavia

== See also ==
- List of children of Orthodox priests
- List of Orthodox dioceses and archdioceses
- List of current patriarchs

== Sources ==
On the politics section the main source is Political Graveyard: Eastern Orthodox Politicians.

For other sections Adherents.com Famous Adherents Eastern Orthodox Christians and NNDB.com were used. As these are unreliable additional searches on each individual were used for verification.
