= Kehidupan =

Single by God Bless

from the album Semut Hitam
- Released: 1988
- Genre: Glam metal, hard rock
- Length: 5:03
- Label: Logiss Records
- Songwriter: Jockie Soerjoprajogo

Audio sample
- The opening riff by Ian Antono and lyrics sung by Ahmad Albar. The hard-rock influence has been cited as a possible reason for the song's continuing popularity.: file; help

"Kehidupan" ("Life") is a 1988 single by God Bless from their third album, Semut Hitam (Black Ants).

== Production ==
"Kehidupan" was written by Jockie Soerjoprajogo. Ahmad Albar performed the vocals, while Ian Antono was on the guitar, Donny Fattah was on bass, Jockie was on keyboard, and Teddy Sujaya was on drums.

== Sound ==
Denny MR, writing in Rolling Stone Indonesia, notes that there is a spirit of collaboration between the band members, who had spent the previous seven years pursuing individual projects. Antono's guitar riffs are inspired by heavy metal and rougher than on previous albums, while Jockie's keyboarding is smoother than his last album with the band, Huma di Atas Bukit (House on the Hill; 1976). The bass complements the other instruments, instead of simply setting the beat.

The song's arrangement is not as complicated as "Anak Adam" ("Child of Adam"), from God Bless' second album Cermin (Mirror; 1981), which had been written while Jockie was on hiatus from the band. The lyrics are multi-interpretable.

== Release and reception ==
"Kehidupan" was released on God Bless' third album, Semut Hitam (Black Ants), in 1988 through Loggis Records. According to Jockie, it is one of their most successful and recognisable singles; Jodhi Yudono of Kompas writes that it was a smash hit.

The song was selected as the 8th-best Indonesian song of all time by Rolling Stone Indonesia in December 2009. In his review, Denny MR noted that while he was a judge in a traveling song festival in February 2009, in Makassar, South Sulawesi, high-school students who had not been born when the song was released had memorized it and performed it at the festival; when he asked them why they had chosen the song, they said that their parents had played it and they had enjoyed it. He suggested that the simple melody and hard rock chords had influenced its staying power.

== Controversy ==
After having a falling out with God Bless in 2003, Jockie refused to allow the band to play his compositions, including "Kehidupan"; this extended to including performances on video recordings of the band, such as at the 2010 Djakarta Artmosphere festival. In October 2011, along with information about why he left the band, he posted on his Facebook wall that the band owed him royalties for continuing to use his work.

The song also allegedly plagiarized The song by the Brazilian band Kid Abelha called Lágrimas e Chuva
