= Badai Pasti Berlalu (song) =

Single by Berlian Hutauruk

from the album Badai Pasti Berlalu
- Released: 1977
- Genre: Pop
- Length: 3:35
- Label: Irama Mas
- Songwriter(s): Eros Djarot
- Producer(s): Yockie Surjoprajogo

Audio sample
- file; help

"Badai Pasti Berlalu" (Indonesian pronunciation: [ˌbadai̯ ˌpast̪i bərˈlalu]; English: "The Storm Will Surely Pass") is an Indonesian song written by Eros Djarot and released in 1977 as part of the soundtrack of Badai Pasti Berlalu. It was originally sung by Berlian Hutauruk but has also been covered by Chrisye and Ari Lasso. Rolling Stone Indonesia ranked it as the third-best Indonesian song of all time.

== Conception ==
"Badai Pasti Berlalu" was written by Eros Djarot and arranged by Yockie Surjoprajogo. It was used in the soundtrack for Badai Pasti Berlalu.

Teguh Karya, the director of Badai Pasti Berlalu, disagreed with the choice of Berlian Hutauruk. He considered her voice screechy, saying "What is this voice...sounds like Kuntilanak." (Note: Original: "Suara apa ini... seperti suara Kuntilanak.") and insisted that Anna Mathovani, with her smoother vocals, should be the singer. However, when Eros Djarot threatened to cancel the entire soundtrack, Teguh Karya gave in.

== Themes ==
"Badai Pasti Berlalu" is seen as a dark and gloomy song about being optimistic when suffering, as shown by the refrain:

Indonesian

Kini, semua bukan milikku
Musim itu telah berlalu
Matahari segera berganti
Badai pasti berlalu, badai pasti berlalu

English

Now, nothing is mine
That time has passed
The sun will soon change
And the storm will surely pass, the storm will surely pass.

== Noah version ==
"Badai Pasti Berlalu"

Single by NOAH
- Language: Indonesian
- Released: June 11, 2021
- Recorded: 2021
- Studio: Musica Studio's, Jakarta
- Genre: Pop rock; Alternative rock
- Length: 3:54
- Label: Musica Studio's
- Songwriter(s): Eros Djarot

NOAH singles chronology
"Mencari Cinta" (2021)	"Badai Pasti Berlalu" (2021)	"Yang Terdalam" (2021)

Music video
- "Badai Pasti Berlalu" on YouTube

In 2021, Indonesian rock band Noah covered the song for the soundtrack to the 2021 TV series adaptation of the film. Noah's keyboardist David said they carefully studied the old "Badai Pasti Berlalu" (1977) album before working on their version. In the process, Noah said they had made three versions of the song before choosing the "cinematic one". Noah first performed their version at the launch of the soap opera Badai Pasti Pass on May 24, 2021.

=== Release and promotion ===
Noah's version of the song was released as a single on digital music services on June 11, 2021. The cover art for the single was created by Garis Edelweiss.

=== Accolades ===
For this song, Noah won the Best Pop Duo/Group at Anugerah Musik Indonesia 2021. At the same award ceremony, this song as the soundtrack of the soap opera Badai Pasti Berlalu was nominated for the category Best Original Soundtrack Production Work.

== Covers ==
"Badai Pasti Berlalu" was covered by Chrisye in 1999 as part of a rerelease of the original album and by Ari Lasso as part of the soundtrack to the 2007 remake of the original film.

== Legacy ==
Rolling Stone Indonesia selected the original "Badai Pasti Berlalu", as sung by Berlian Hutauruk, as the third-best Indonesian song in their 2009 list "The 150 Best Indonesian Songs of All Time." They called it Eros Djarot's masterpiece and noted that it had become Berlian Hutauruk's signature song. The subsequent cover versions were considered inferior because

"lyrically [Badai Pasti Berlalu] is about a woman who is constantly suffering. It feels awkward and weird when it was sung by a man, even though Chrisye and Ari Lasso tried to sing it as expressively as possible." (Note: Original: ". . . secara verbal lagu ini bertutur tentang seorang wanita yang didera derita. Jadi terasa janggal dan aneh jika lagu tadi dinyanyikan seorang lelaki, walaupun Chrisye maupun Ari Lasso telah berupaya menyanyikannya seekspresif mungkin")

"Badai Pasti Berlalu" has also become part of popular culture. During the 1997 Asian financial crisis, then-president Suharto quoted the title of the song to reassure the people.
