= Albar =

Albar may refer to:

- Albar (car), a Swiss car marque
- Ahmad Albar (born 1946), Indonesian rock musician
- Syed Hamid Albar (born 1944), Malaysian politician, member of UMNO and son of Syed Jaafar Albar
- Syed Jaafar Albar (1914–1977), Malaysian politician and member of UMNO
