= Badai Pasti Berlalu (novel) =

1974 novel by Marga T

- Author: Marga T
- Language: Indonesia
- Genre: Novel
- Publisher: Gramedia Pustaka Utama
- Publication date: 1974
- Publication place: Indonesia
- Media type: Print (Paperback)
- Pages: 480 (16th printing)
- ISBN: 979-686-001-5

Badai Pasti Berlalu (Indonesian pronunciation: [ˌbadai̯ ˌpast̪i bərˈlalu]; English: The Storm Will Surely Pass) is an Indonesian novel written by Marga T and published in 1974. It spawned award-winning film, music album, and a song of the same name.

== Plot ==
Siska, a young woman, was heartbroken after her fiancé broke off their engagement and married her friend. Unwilling to see his sister depressed, her brother Johnny introduced her to womanizing friend Leo. Leo manages to make Siska happy. However, unknown to Siska, Leo was only interested in her as part of a bet.

After overhearing Leo discussing the bet with his friends, Siska runs away from Leo and is found by night club pianist Helmi. Helmi blackmails Siska into marrying him, threatening to tell her mother that her father is having an affair with a younger woman. Eventually becoming unable to stand Helmi's actions, Siska returns to Leo.

== Release and reception ==
Badai Pasti Berlalu was originally released in installments in Kompas between 5 June and 2 September 1972. It was later rereleased as a novel by Gramedia Pustaka Utama in 1974. It sold well, selling 24,000 copies in a short period of time, a "fantastic amount" at the time, despite costing more than ten times the cost of a magazine.

== Legacy ==
Badai Pasti Berlalu was adapted into a film by Teguh Karya in 1977. The film was critically acclaimed, receiving four awards at the 1977 Indonesian Film Festival and later becoming the second-best-selling Indonesian film of 1977. The film's soundtrack album was critically acclaimed, being listed as the best Indonesian album of all time by Rolling Stone Indonesia. Rolling Stone Indonesia later listed the film's title song as the third best Indonesian song of all time.

The film was remade by Teddy Soeriaatmadja in 2007.
