= George Marten =

George Marten may refer to:

- George Marten (priest) (1876–1966), Anglican priest
- George Marten (cricketer, born 1801) (1801–1876), English cricketer
- George Marten (cricketer, born 1840) (1840–1905), English cricketer
