= Debby Nasution =

- Born: Debi Murti Nasution; March 12, 1956; Jakarta, Indonesia
- Died: September 15, 2018 (aged 62); Jakarta, Indonesia
- Resting place: Pasir Putih Public Cemetery, Depok
- Other name: Debbie Nasution
- Occupations: Musician; music director; arranger; songwriter; singer; Islamic preacher
- Years active: 1971–2018
- Spouse: Sitoresmi Prabuningrat (m. 1996; died 2018)
- Family: Keenan Nasution (brother)
- Musical career
- Genres: Pop; progressive rock
- Instruments: Vocals; keyboard; organ; piano

Debi Murti Nasution (12 March 1956 ‒ 15 September 2018), better known as Debby Nasution, was an Indonesian musician and singer of Batak descent from North Sumatra. He was a member of the musical Nasution family and one of the early members of several Indonesian music groups such as Barong's Band and Gank Pegangsaan.

== Career ==
Debby Nasution began his musical career by joining the band The Bumpee's, before later forming The Young Gipsy with Oding in 1971. In 1973, he briefly joined the rock band God Bless, with whom he remained until 1975.

In 1975, Nasution joined Barong's Band as the keyboardist. He contributed to the production of two albums by Barong's Band, playing a significant role in the second album; on that album, he collaborated with Eros Djarot in arranging the music and wrote a song titled "Negara Kita". His performance on the album drew influence from the classical composer Johann Sebastian Bach, particularly in his use of the organ and piano.

During the late 1970s, he was heavily involved as an instrumentalist and music arranger on various Indonesian albums, including the soundtrack album Badai Pasti Berlalu and the compilation album Lomba Cipta Lagu Remaja, released in 1977 and 1979 respectively. Badai Pasti Berlalu was later named the greatest Indonesian album of all time by the Indonesian edition of Rolling Stone magazine in issue No. 32, published in December 2007.

In 1989, he, along with Keenan, Harry Sabar, Harry Minggoes, Fariz RM, Molly Gagola, and Sitoresmi Prabuningrat, founded the band Gank Pegangsaan and released the album Palestina, with the song "Dirimu" becoming a hit. They later released two more albums, titled Palestina II and Kerusuhan. In 2017, Debby joined the band Giant Step and released the album Life's Not the Same.

== Death ==
Nasution died on 15 September 2018, reportedly due to a heart attack, after delivering a sermon at Al-Ikhlas Mosque in South Cipete, Cilandak.

== Discography ==
=== Solo ===
- Buah Hati (1982)
