= Metropolitan (album) =

Studio album by Chrisye
- Released: January 1984
- Recorded: June – December 1983
- Genre: Pop
- Length: 45:06
- Label: Musica Studios
- Producer: Eros Djarot; Chrisye; Jockie Soerjoprajogo

Chrisye chronology
Resesi (1983)	Metropolitan (1984)	Nona (1984)

Metropolitan is a seventh studio album by Indonesian singer, Chrisye, released in January 1984 by Musica Studios. The album, drawing on new wave influences and dealing mainly with issues facing youth, was well received. It is one of the three albums that Chrisye collaborated with Eros Djarot and Jockie Soerjoprajogo, the others being Resesi and Nona. It also one of his three albums that was released in 1984.

== Production ==
Following the success Resesi (1983), which was sold over 350,000 copies and certified silver, Chrisye continued his collaboration with Eros Djarot and Jockie Soerjoprajogo, and began working on Metropolitan in June 1983. Recording of the album took six months to completed. In his biography, Chrisye stated that the album would have a new wave beat, similar to that of The Police.

On the album, Chrisye provided lead vocals and played bass, while Soerjoprajogo played keyboards and provided backing vocals. They were joined by Ian Antono on guitars and Uce Hudioro on drums and percussions. Chrisye, Soerjoprajogo and Djarot handles songwriting. Lucy Leona provided backing vocals. For the first time in his music career, Chrisye include an instrumental song entitled "O... Da... Da...". It was the only instrumental song he ever recorded.

== Release and reception ==
The album was released in January 1984 with a cover was designed by Chrisye's childhood friend Gauri Nasution and photographed by Zoom. It was well received with "Selamat Jalan Kekasih" ("Goodbye Dear") was released as the album's only single.

Metropolitan has been reissued twice, once as a CD in 2004 and once as part of the Chrisye Masterpiece Trilogy Limited Edition in 2007.

== Track listing ==
No.	Title	Writer(s)	Length
1.	"Romeo & Julia '83" ("Romeo & Juliet '83")	Chrisye, Eros Djarot	4:04
2.	"Selamat Jalan Kekasih" ("Goodbye Dear")	Jockie Soerjoprajogo, Eros Djarot	4:00
3.	"Metropolitan"	Chrisye, Eros Djarot, Jockie Soerjoprajogo	4:58
4.	"Kehadiranmu" ("Your Presence")	Jockie Soerjorajogo, Eros Djarot	4:27
5.	"Kenangan Remaja" ("Teenager's Memories")	Eros Djarot	4:13
6.	"Lagi-Lagi" ("Again and Again")	Chrisye, Eros Djarot	4:15
7.	"Suratmu" ("Your Letter")	Jockie Soerjoprajogo, Eros Djarot	5:02
8.	"Natalie"	Chrisye, Eros Djarot	4:27
9.	"O... Da... Da..." (Instrumental)	Jockie Soerjoprajogo	4:40
10.	"Pengakuan" ("Confessions")	Jockie Soerjoprajogo, Eros Djarot	4:54
Total length:			45:06

== Works cited ==
- "Chrisye Rilis Album Trilogi" [Chrisye Releases a Trilogy Album]. IndonesiaSelebriti.com (in Indonesian). Media Entertainment Online. 9 October 2007. Archived from the original on 27 March 2012.
- "Chrisye Rilis Ulang 22 Album Lawas" [Chrisye Rereleases 22 Old Albums]. KotaBNI News (in Indonesian). 28 October 2004. Archived from the original on 5 April 2012.
- Endah, Alberthiene (2007). Chrisye: Sebuah Memoar Musikal [Chrisye: A Musical Memoir] (in Indonesian). Jakarta: Gramedia. ISBN 978-979-22-2606-5.
- Metropolitan (Media notes). Chrisye. Musica Studios. 1984.
- Sakri, Denny (2007). Chrisye Masterpiece Trilogi 01 (Media notes). Chrisye. Musica Studios.
- Sartono, Frans (1 April 2007). "Chrisye: Dari Lilin Kecil ke Badai" [Chrisye: From a Small Candle to a Storm]. Kompas (in Indonesian). p. 1.
