= Jockie Soerjoprajogo =

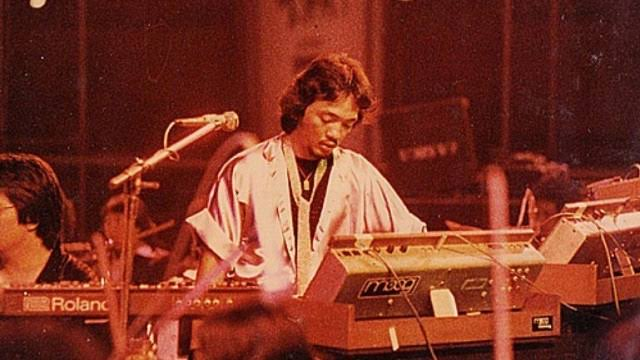

Background information
- Born: 14 September 1954; Demak, Central Java, Indonesia
- Died: 5 February 2018 (aged 63) Jakarta, Indonesia
- Instrument: Keyboard
- Years active: c. 1967–2018
- Formerly of: God Bless

Jockie Soerjoprajogo (Indonesian: [ˈjoki sʊrjopraˈjoɡo]; Perfected Spelling: Yockie Suryoprayogo; 14 September 1954 – 5 February 2018) was an Indonesian musician and songwriter. Jockie began his musical career while a junior high school student in Balikpapan, East Kalimantan. After working with bands in Jakarta and Surabaya, in 1973, he joined with Ahmad Albar, Donny Fattah and Ludwig Leeman to form God Bless; he would remain with this band intermittently until the 2000s. Jockie also worked with artists such as Chrisye and Iwan Fals, ultimately writing two songs—"Kehidupan" ("Life") and "Kesaksian" ("Witness")—that were listed by Rolling Stone Indonesia as among the best Indonesian songs of all time.

== Biography ==
Jockie was born in Demak, Central Java on 14 September 1954. After beginning his education in Demak, he went to Semarang near the end of his primary years to finish elementary school. His middle school education was in Balikpapan, East Kalimantan; while there he joined the local band Safira. Most of his musical skills were self-taught, although he did study composition under Muchtar Embut and musical notation under Idris Sardi.

After middle school, Jockie moved to Jakarta and joined with several acts there, before moving to Surabaya, East Java and joining Jaguar, led by Mickey Makelbach. He eventually finished high school in Malang and moved back to Jakarta. In 1973, he joined with Ahmad Albar, Donny Fattah and Ludwig Leeman to form God Bless; their first concert was in Taman Ismail Marzuki in May 1973. He split from the band for a brief time to found the bands Giant Step in Bandung and Double Zero in Malang, but returned in early 1975. During this period he was heavily into drugs, once stealing and selling a ring belonging to songwriter Harry Roesli to fuel his habit.

In 1976 Jockie joined the committee for Prambors FM's Teenage Song Writing Competition. Along with Prambors head Imran Amir, he unsuccessfully approached Chrisye to ask him to sing the song "Lilin-Lilin Kecil" ("Small Candles"); when Chrisye was convinced to record the single by Sys NS, Jockie handled the arrangement. The following year, Jockie collaborated with Chrisye for a new album, Jurang Pemisah (Dividing Canyon); Chrisye provided vocals for seven songs while Jockie provided the vocals for two and wrote several more.

In 1977 Jockie joined with Chrisye and Eros Djarot to record the soundtrack to Badai Pasti Berlalu, directed by Teguh Karya. After the film's success, the soundtrack was rerecorded in Pluit, North Jakarta over a period of 21 days and sold as a soundtrack album. The album, also titled Badai Pasti Berlalu, went on to sell 9 million copies over the next sixteen years. In 1978 he released his first solo album, Musik Saya adalah Saya (My Music is Me). This was followed by four more albums over the next 15 years, Yang Terhilang Lepas (Free and Missing), Pernyataan (Statement), Penantian (Waiting), and Selamat Jalan Kekasih (Goodbye Dear). Meanwhile, with God Bless he released Semut Hitam (Black Ants; 1988), Raksasa (Monster; 1989), and Apa Kabar? (What's Up?; 1997).

Jockie again worked with Chrisye for the 1979 album Percik Pesona, for which he wrote several songs. The album was a critical and commercial failure, with critics writing that it was too much like Badai Pasti Berlalu. Beginning in 1983, Jockie joined with Chrisye and Djarot to produce a trilogy of albums, Resesi (Recession; 1983), Metropolitan (1984), and Nona (Miss; 1984); the albums all went platinum. During the early 1990s, Jockie joined with Iwan Fals' band Swami to record Kantata Takwa (Cantata of Taqwa). He and the band would often clash over creative differences, but reportedly were willing to compromise.

In 1993 he released another solo album, Suket (Grass); he also arranged the music for the album. In it he tried to give social commentary from his observations, a technique previously used by Iwan Fals. In 2003 he left God Bless again after creative differences; in an October 2011 Facebook post, he wrote that he had been forced to leave the group and that he was outraged that the band continued to play his songs without his permission. In a later interview with Kompas, he stated that lead singer Ahmad Albar had pulled a gun on him when debating the latter's drug use. Guitarist Ian Antono confirmed that a pistol was involved, but he thought it could be a toy; he stated that the argument flared up when Jockie insulted Albar's family.

Jockie collaborated with numerous artists in October 2009 to put on a tribute concert to Chrisye. Together with Garin Nugroho, in 2010 Jockie helped produce the musical Diana for the Kompas's 45th anniversary. For the production, a tribute to Koes Plus, Jockie remastered 20 of their songs.

== Accolades ==
In December 2009, Rolling Stone Indonesia selected two of Jockie's songs as being among the 150 best Indonesian songs of all time. His composition "Kehidupan" ("Life"), from God Bless' album Semut Hitam was ranked 8th, while "Kesaksian" ("Witness"), from Iwan Fals' album Kantata Takwa was ranked 82nd.

== Personal life and death ==
Jockie was married first to Indah Soekotjo and had two children. Then they divorced and Jockie married Pratiwi Puspitasari and also had two children. He had four children in total. One of his sons, Nara Putra, plays guitar in the band Jibriel alongside the children of several other God Bless members.

After Jockie was hospitalised at Pondok Indah Hospital in South Jakarta for complications resulting from diabetes, cirrhosis, and a stroke, on 24 January 2018 a group of musicians (including Nicky Astria, Berlian Hutauruk, and Fariz RM) held a tribute/charity concert at Taman Ismail Marzuki. This concert, titled "Pagelaran Sang Bahaduri" (Hero's Performance), was reported to have raised Rp 514.04 million (US$38,600) to help pay for Jockie's treatment. On 5 February 2018, Jockie died in the hospital. He was buried at Karet Bivak Cemetery in Jakarta.
