= Nona (album) =

Studio album by Chrisye
- Released: November 1984
- Genre: Pop
- Length: 45:43
- Label: Musica Studios
- Producers: Eros Djarot; Chrisye; Jockie Soerjoprajogo

Chrisye chronology
Metropolitan (1984)	Nona (1984)	Sendiri (1985)

Nona (Miss) is the eighth studio album by Indonesian singer, Chrisye, released in November 1984 by Musica Studios. The album, which featured social criticism, spawned four singles and went on to be certified platinum. It is one of the three albums that Chrisye collaborated with Eros Djarot and Jockie Soerjoprajogo, the others being Resesi and Metropolitan. It also one of his three albums that was released in 1984.

== Production ==
Nona was Chrisye's third and final collaboration with Eros Djarot and Jockie Soerjoprajogo after they previously working together on Resesi and Metropolitan. Like his previous albums, Nona mainly highlights social criticism.

On the album, Chrisye provided lead vocals and played bass, while Soerjoprajogo played keyboards and percussions. They were joined by Ian Antono on guitars and Uce Hudioro on drums and percussions. Djarot composed seven songs in the album while Jockie composed the other three. Singer, Hetty Koes Endang provided guest vocals on two songs, namely "Sayang" ("Dear") and "Gadis Manja" ("Cute Girl"). Jockie provided backing vocals for "Gadis Manja" and serves as the arranger. There is a song called "Selamat Datang Anakku" ("Welcome, My Child"), which was specially dedicated by Chrisye to his eldest daughter, Rizkia Nurannisa, who was born a year before.

== Release and reception ==
The album was released in 1984 and spawned four singles, including the title track. It was well received and being certified platinum. Despite Nona's warm sales, after some influence from Aciu Widjaja, Chrisye decided to look for a new sound and broke off his partnership with Djarot and Jockie in mid-1984.

Nona has been reissued twice, once as a CD in 2004 and once as part of the Chrisye Masterpiece Trilogy Limited Edition in 2007.

== Track listing ==
All tracks are written by Eros Djarot except where noted.

No.	Title	Writer(s)	Length
1.	"Berita Ironi" ("Ironical News")	Jockie Soerjoprajogo, Eros Djarot	4:37
2.	"Sayang" ("Dear"; feat. Hetty Koes Endang)	Jockie Soerjoprajogo, Eros Djarot	4:48
3.	"Nona" ("Miss")		4:38
4.	"Selamat Datang Anakku" ("Welcome, My Child")		4:20
5.	"Gadis Manja" ("Cute Girl"; feat. Hetty Koes Endang and Jockie Soerjoprajogo)		4:40
6.	"Hilangnya Sebuah Pribadi" ("A Personal Loss")		3:45
7.	"Lagu Untukmu" ("A Song for You")		5:10
8.	"Sarjana Kaki Lima" ("Street Scholar")		4:46
9.	"Salam Hangat" ("Warm Greetings")	Jockie Soerjoprajogo, Eros Djarot	4:53
10.	"Biarkan Ku Sejenak" ("Let Me Be a Moment")		4:03
Total length:			45:43

== Works cited ==
- "Chrisye Rilis Album Trilogi" [Chrisye Releases a Trilogy Album]. IndonesiaSelebriti.com (in Indonesian). Media Entertainment Online. 9 October 2007. Archived from the original on 27 March 2012.
- "Chrisye Rilis Ulang 22 Album Lawas" [Chrisye Rereleases 22 Old Albums]. KotaBNI News (in Indonesian). 28 October 2004. Archived from the original on 5 April 2012.
- Endah, Alberthiene (2007). Chrisye: Sebuah Memoar Musikal [Chrisye: A Musical Memoir] (in Indonesian). Jakarta: Gramedia. ISBN 978-979-22-2606-5.
- Nona (Media notes). Chrisye. Musica Studios. 1984.
- Sakri, Denny (2007). Chrisye Masterpiece Trilogi 01 (Media notes). Chrisye. Musica Studios.
- Sartono, Frans (1 April 2007). "Chrisye: Dari Lilin Kecil ke Badai" [Chrisye: From a Small Candle to a Storm]. Kompas (in Indonesian). p. 1.
