= Hutauruk =

Hutauruk is a Toba Batak clan (marga). People of this clan bears the clan's name as their surname. Notable persons of this clan are:

- Berlian Hutauruk (born 1957), Indonesian singer
- Syarfi Hutauruk (born 1959), Sibolga Mayor
- Bornok Hutauruk (born 1955), Indonesian singer
- Allah Hutauruk (born 1969), Indonesian musician
