= God Bless =

Indonesian rock band

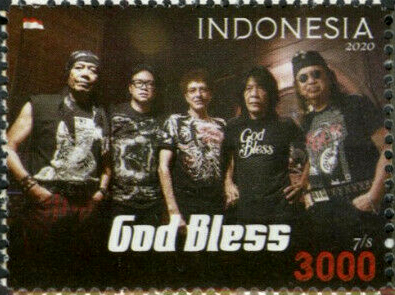
- God Bless on a 2020 stamp of Indonesia

Background information
- Origin: Jakarta, Indonesia
- Genres: Hard rock; arena rock; progressive rock; heavy metal; glam metal; pop rock
- Years active: 1973–present
- Members: Ahmad Albar; Ian Antono; Abadi Soesman; Fajar Satritama
- Past members: Jockie Soerjoprajogo; Ludwig Lemans; Fuad Hassan; Soman Lubis; Deddy Dores; Deddy Stanzah; Keenan Nasution; Odink Nasution; Debby Nasution; Teddy Sujaya Syah; Eet Sjahranie; Gilang Ramadhan; Yaya Moektio; Iwang Noorsaid; Inang Noorsaid; Donny Fattah

God Bless is an Indonesian rock band founded in Jakarta in 1973 by Ahmad Albar, Jockie Soerjoprajogo, Fuad Hassan, Donny Fattah, and Ludwig Lemans. It continues to be active and has received several awards from the Indonesian music industry.

== History ==
God Bless was founded by Ahmad Albar (vocals), Jockie Soerjoprajogo (keyboard), Fuad Hassan (drums), Donny Fattah (bass), and Ludwig Lemans (guitar) in 1973. They had their first concert on 5 May 1973 at Taman Ismail Marzuki, which was followed on 16 August with the Summer 28 concert, the first (and, as of 2004, largest) open-air concert in Indonesia. During that period they also played at the Jakarta Fair, held near the National Monument. That same year the band acted in Ambisi (Ambition); Lemans left the band not long after to return to the Netherlands.

In 1975, the band opened for British rock band Deep Purple when the latter played in Jakarta. They released their first album, Huma di Atas Bukit (Rice Field on a Hill), the following year. The titular song for the progressive rock album, an adaptation of "Firth of Fifth", from Genesis' 1973 album Selling England by the Pound, went on to be used as the theme song to Sjumadjaja's film Laila Majenun (Laila is Possessed).

Four years later, God Bless released Cermin (Mirror), which included more ballads and showed influences from Deep Purple and Van Halen; Abadi Soesman contributed a bit. The band, in an off-again on-again state for the next several years, released their third album, Semut Hitam (Black Ants) in 1988; the album went on to be their most successful. This was followed by Raksasa (Monster; 1989), and Apa Kabar? (What's Up?; 1997).

God Bless performed a "duel" with Padi on 9 November 2011, a band twenty years younger; held in the Hard Rock Cafe Jakarta, the duel was witnessed by over 200 people, greater than the capacity of the venue. In 2003 Jockie left the group and replaced by Iwang Noorsaid and Abadi Soesman on Keyboard ; initially reported as being over creative differences, in October 2011 Jockie revealed that it was after a fight over Albar's drug habits. Jockie, once a drug user himself, was asked to tell Albar to stop using drugs; in response, Albar reportedly pulled a gun on him. Jockie was soon replaced by Abadi Soesman. Guitarist Ian Antono confirmed that a pistol was involved, but he thought it could be a toy; he stated that the argument flared up when Jockie insulted Albar's family.

In 2007, Yaya Moekito (1957–2025) joined the band as a drummer. After Albar was imprisoned for drug possession in November 2007 and paroled in July 2008, in mid-2009, God Bless played at the Jakarta Fair and released another album, 36th. In late 2009 the band was pictured on the cover of Rolling Stone Indonesia. The following year, the band went on a cross-country tour, playing in nine cities and accompanied by Nidji, Gigi, Andra and The BackBone, and Naif. The band also played in the 2010 Djakarta Artmosphere festival.

On 14 June 2011, God Bless performed at the Hard Rock Cafe with Jibriel to celebrate founder's day; the latter group consists of two of Albar's sons, one of Jockie's, one of Antono's, and Albar's nephew Bagoes. In July, the band played at the Hard Rock Cafe Jakarta to celebrate its 40th anniversary. The following month, from 22 to 24 July 2011, the band performed at the InterMusic Java Rockin' Land alongside The Cranberries and Neon Trees. On 20 October 2011 Jockie posted on his Facebook wall that he was upset that the band continued to play songs written by him without paying royalties.

Drummer Yaya Moektio died from tuberculosis on 8 December 2025, at the age of 68. Bassist Donny Fattah died from sarcopenia, vascular blockage, and autoimmune diseases on 7 March 2026, at the age of 76.

== Themes ==
Tertiani Z.B. Simanjuntak, writing for The Jakarta Post, notes that God Bless often advocated the rights of the poor and working classes.

== Accolades ==
In a 2009 issue of Rolling Stone Indonesia, two of God Bless' songs were ranked as being among the 150 best Indonesian songs of all time: "Kehidupan" ("Life"), was ranked 8th, while "Rumah Kita" ("Our Home") was ranked 22nd.

In August 2011, Kompas reported that Mira Lesmana and Riri Riza had spent two years producing a documentary about the band, to be titled Rockumentary.

== Discography ==
=== Albums ===
- God Bless (1975)
- Cermin (1980)
- Semut Hitam (1988)
- Raksasa (1989)
- Apa Kabar (1997)
- 36th (2009)
- Cermin 7 (2016)
- God Bless Live at Aquarius Studio (2019)
- Anthology 50th Year Anniversary (with Tohpati & Czech Symphony Orchestra) (2023)

=== Compilations ===
- The Story of God Bless (1990)
- 18 Greatest Hits of God Bless (1992)
- The Greatest Slow Hits (1999)

=== Singles ===
- Vonis (1991)
- Untuk Indonesiaku (2020)
- Mulai Hari Ini (2021)
