= Berlian Hutauruk =

Indonesian soprano of Batak descent (born 1957)

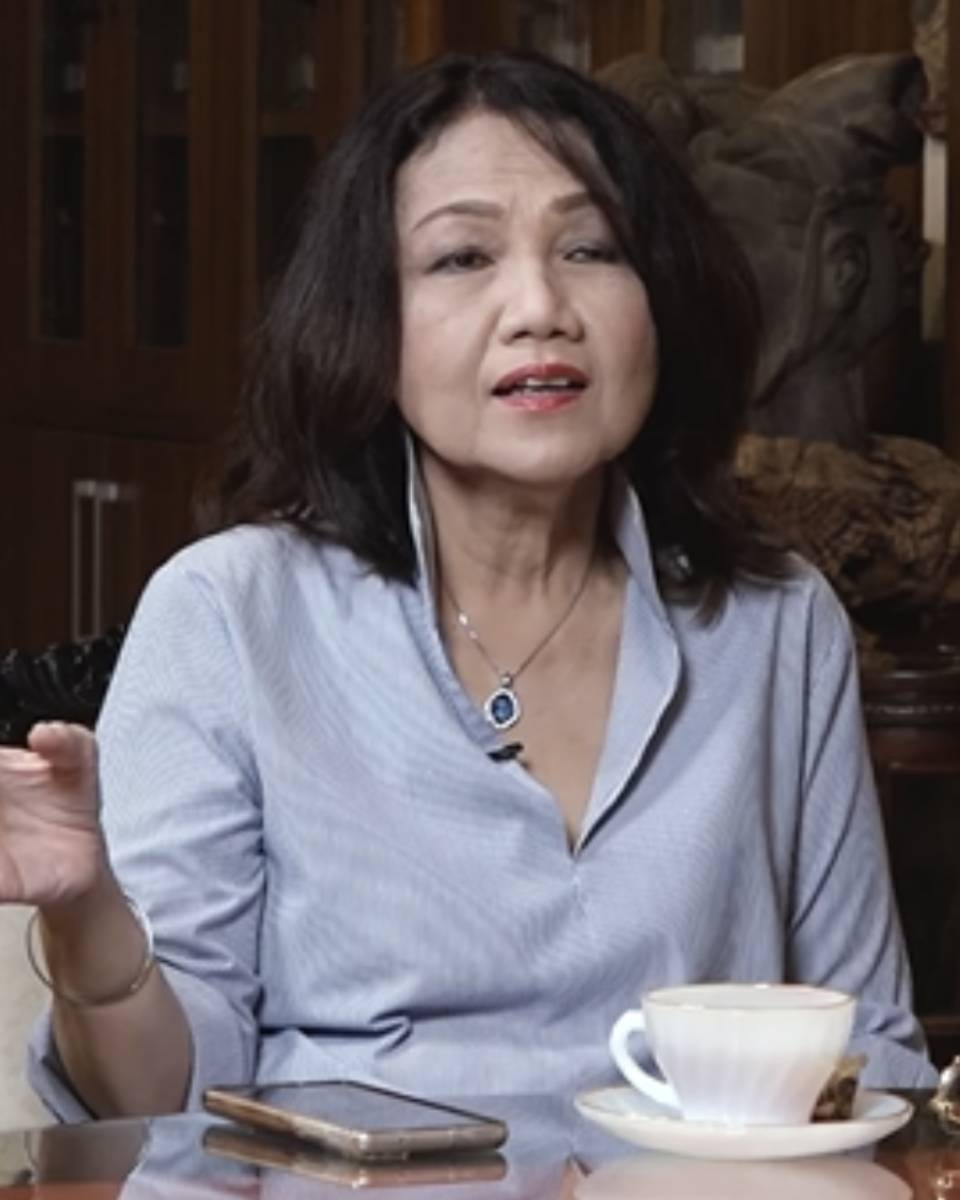
- Hutauruk in 2023

Background information
- Born: 11 October 1957 (age 67); Jakarta, Indonesia
- Genres: Pop, religious
- Occupation: Singer
- Instrument: Vocals (soprano)
- Years active: 1975–present

Berlian Hutauruk (born 11 October 1957, in Jakarta) is an Indonesian soprano of Batak descent. Beginning her career singing religious music in church, Hutauruk later sang for movie soundtracks and released a solo album. She is best known for singing "Badai Pasti Berlalu", which Rolling Stone Indonesia selected as the third-best Indonesian song of all time in 2009.

== Biography ==
Berlian Hutauruk was born in Jakarta on 11 October 1957. In 1968, she participated in the Ayo Menyanyi television show on Televisi Republik Indonesia. After attending middle school, Hutauruk studied at a secretarial academy.

Hutauruk started her vocal training in church, singing religious songs and eventually travelling to Europe for a religious music festival. After placing second in a national-level pop competition, the Association of Indonesian churches sent her to study in the United States.

In 1977, Eros Djarot asked Hutauruk to provide vocals for the soundtrack to Badai Pasti Berlalu together with Chrisye. However, the director Teguh Karya disliked her voice, asking "Whose voice is this, Kuntilanak?" (Note: Original: "Suara apa ini... seperti suara Kuntilanak.") after hearing it for the first time. When Djarot threatened to cancel the soundtrack, Teguh Karya gave in and Hutauruk recorded the song.

Later that year, Hutauruk was asked to return to record a soundtrack album for Badai Pasti Berlalu. After its recording and release, the resulting album was well-received, as was the title song, "Badai Pasti Berlalu". Hutauruk's vocals were considered one of the highlights of the album. "Badai Pasti Berlalu" has since been considered her signature song.

After the release of Badai Pasti Berlalu, Hutauruk released Nyanyian Cinta. She also provided vocals for the film version of Karmila, adopted from the Marga T novel of the same name. In 1981, she joined the ASEAN Pop Music Festival.

Hutauruk later left the spotlight, although she continued to sing in churches, wedding receptions, and company parties. In 2005, Hutauruk made a brief return to the spotlight after the 2004 Indian Ocean earthquake and tsunami, singing "Badai Pasti Berlalu" for the victims. It was well received.

== Legacy ==
Hutauruk's placing second in the 1975 pop competition has been cited as paving the way for female sopranos in Indonesia. Before that, most female Indonesian singers were mezzo-sopranos and altos.

In 2007, Rolling Stone Indonesia chose Badai Pasti Berlalu as the best Indonesian album of all time. In 2009, they chose Hutauruk's version of "Badai Pasti Berlalu" as the third-best Indonesian song of all time, writing that:

"... Berlian Hutauruk with perfect articulation breathes life into each and every word..." (Note: Original: "... Berlian Hutauruk dengan artikulasi sempurna meniupkan roh terhadap kata demi kata...")

They also wrote that other versions by male artists could not compare, lacking her emotional strength.

== Discography ==
- Badai Pasti Berlalu (English: The Storm Will Surely Pass; 1977)
- Nyanyian Cinta (English: Love's Song)
