= Badai Pasti Berlalu (film) =

- Directed by: Teguh Karya
- Starring: Slamet Rahardjo; Roy Marten; Christine Hakim
- Cinematography: Lukman Hakim Nain
- Edited by: Tantra Surjadi
- Music by: Eros Djarot; Chrisye; Berlian Hutauruk; Debby Nasution; Yockie Suryoprayogo
- Production company: Suptan Film
- Release date: November 28, 1977
- Running time: 115 minutes
- Country: Indonesia
- Language: Indonesian

Badai Pasti Berlalu (Indonesian pronunciation: [ˌbadai̯ ˌpast̪i bərˈlalu]; lit. 'The Storm Will Surely Pass') is a 1977 Indonesian film based on the novel of the same name by Marga T. It was directed by Teguh Karya and starred Christine Hakim, Roy Marten and Slamet Rahardjo.

== Plot ==
Siska (Christine Hakim), a young woman, was heartbroken after her fiancé broke off their engagement. Unwilling to see his sister depressed, her brother Johnny introduced her to his friend Leo, who is known as a womanizer. Leo manages to make Siska happy. However, unknown to Siska, Leo was only interested in her as part of a bet.

After overhearing Leo discussing the bet with his friends, Siska runs away from Leo and is found by night club pianist Helmi. Helmi blackmails Siska into marrying him, threatening to tell her mother that her father is having an affair with a younger woman. Eventually becoming unable to stand Helmi's actions, Siska returns to Leo.

== Cast ==
- Christine Hakim as Siska
- Roy Marten as Leo
- Slamet Rahardjo as Helmi

== Production ==
Teguh Karya felt forced to make Badai Pasti Berlalu. He later confided to Pikiran Rakyat that he

"... needed to breathe, and pay his respects to his earlier, commercially unsuccessful films. [He] also wanted to visualize a novel." (Note: Original: "... ingin nafas, dan balas budi dari film-film terdahulu yang kurang laku. Selain saya ingin memvisualkan sebuah novel ke dalam bahasa visual.")

There was also conflict between Teguh Karya and composer Eros Djarot. Teguh Karya disagreed with the choice of Berlian Hutauruk. He considered her voice screechy, saying "Whose voice is this? Kuntilanak’s?" (Note: Original: "Suara apa ini... seperti suara Kuntilanak.") and insisted that Anna Mathovani, with her smoother vocals, should be the singer. However, when Eros Djarot threatened to cancel the entire soundtrack, Teguh Karya gave in.

== 2007 Remake ==
On Valentine's Day, 2007, a 90-minute remake directed by Teddy Soeriaatmadja was released. It was produced by Astral Pictures. It starred Raihaanun as Siska, Vino Bastian as Leo, and Winky Wiryawan as Helmi.

== Soundtrack ==
A soundtrack album with the same name was recorded and released by Irama Mas in 1977. It reunited Eros Djarot with Chrisye, Berlian Hutauruk, and Jockie Soerjoprajogo; Fariz Rustam Munaf joined for the album as well. It was released to popular and critical acclaim.

The soundtrack of the remake was released by Sony BMG Indonesia in 2007. It was composed by pianist Andi Rianto, with vocals by numerous artists, including Ari Lasso, Andy /rif, Marshanda, and Glenn Fredly.

== Reception ==
Badai Pasti Berlalu received numerous awards. At the 1977 Indonesian Film Festival, it won four awards, namely Best Camera Work (Lukman Hakim Nain), Best Editing (Tantra Surjadi), Best Sound Editing and Mixing (Suparman Sidik), and Best Original Score (Eros Djarot). It received an award for being the most lucrative Indonesian film of the 1977–1978 season the following year, being seen by 212,551 people.

Tabloid Bintang considered Badai Pasti Berlalu the fifth best Indonesian film of all time, while Rolling Stone Indonesia listed the soundtrack album as the best Indonesian album of all time.
