= Nicky Astria =

Indonesian musician (born 1967)

- Born: Nicky Nastiti Karya Dewi; 18 October 1967 (age 58); Bandung, West Java, Indonesia
- Origin: Indonesia
- Genres: Hard rock, soft rock, pop rock, glam metal, pop, arena rock
- Occupations: Singer, actress
- Years active: 1984–present
- Labels: Aquarius Musikindo, Harpa Records, Musica Studios, Blackboard Indonesia

Nicky Nastiti Karya Dewi (born 18 October 1967), better known by her stage name Nicky Astria, is an Indonesian musician.

Born in Bandung, West Java, to a schoolteacher and his musician wife, Astria began singing in 1975 while the family was stationed in Kuala Lumpur, Malaysia. After several years of participating in festivals and taking vocal training, in 1984 Astria was signed to AMK Records. Although her first album flopped, she found success with her second and third albums, Jarum Neraka and Tangan-Tangan Setan.

Bruce Emond of The Jakarta Post described her as "one of the biggest [Indonesian] music stars of the late 1980s", while guitarist-cum-songwriter Ian Antono called her "the best female pop rock singer Indonesia has ever seen". Two of her songs, "Jarum Neraka" and "Tangan-Tangan Setan" (both 1985), were listed as among the best Indonesian songs of all time by Rolling Stone Indonesia in 2009

== Biography ==
=== Early life and career ===
Astria was born on 18 October 1967, in Bandung to Tatang Kosasih Wirahadimaja, a schoolteacher, and Andrina Heryati, a traditional musician; she was the couple's only daughter and fourth of five children. Astria was known as a tomboy in her youth. In 1972, her father was sent to head the Indonesian school at the Indonesian embassy in Kuala Lumpur, Malaysia. Astria, although of the age to begin kindergarten, was enrolled in the first grade. She reportedly had trouble initially, as her family spoke Sundanese at home, and thus she had difficulty understanding the Indonesian-language lessons.

Astria sang in public for the first time at Independence Day ceremonies on 17 August 1975. When this was received well, she began singing at different formal occasions, by request of her father. The family returned to Bandung in 1975, and Astria enrolled at Halimun Public Elementary School. She continued to perform and receive vocal coaching, and by the end of elementary school had already competed in the Children's Pop Singing Festival (Festival Penyanyi Pop Anak-Anak). While still at State Junior High School 13 – where she was caught several times skipping school and not paying her school fees – Astria competed in the Teenage Pop Singing Festival (Festival Penyanyi Pop Tingkat Remaja). Although she intended to be a singer, her father wanted her to find another occupation.

In 1981, Wirahadimaja died. On his deathbed, he gave Astria his blessings for her to become a singer; she had just received her first honorarium for performing, Rp. 25,000 for performing Ahmad Albar's "Balada Sejuta Wajah" ("Ballad of A Million Faces"). Her father's death left her family financially destitute, which led to Astria moving to her grandmother's house. She gave her first rock performance with the Ronners at the Rally Rock Jakarta-Bandung in Jakarta.

=== Professional career ===
In 1984, Astria was signed to AMK Records; to be more commercial, she adopted the stage name Nicky Astria. She soon released Semua dari Cinta (Everything from Love), which featured songs by Tarida Hutauruk and Jelly Tobing. The album, which had somewhat pop sound, was poorly received. She was later introduced to several prominent musical figures, including guitarist-cum-songwriter Ian Antono, who served as producer and helped her further her career. She was managed by her brother Bucky for the first several years of her career.

Astria second album, Jarum Neraka (Pin from Hell), was released in 1985. It had more of a rock feel and sold over 350,000 copies, making it the first Indonesian rock album to do so. It was followed by Tangan-Tangan Setan (Hands of Satan), also in 1985; this third album brought her mainstream success. Astria's success led to numerous new female rockers entering the industry, after three previous female rockers had left several years earlier. Although her elder brother Dicky insisted she attend university, Astria focused on her musical career.

Every year from 1985 to 1987, Astria won the BASF Award for Best Female Rock Singer. In the late 1980s Astria toured with fellow female rockers Nike Ardilla and Anggun, often sharing a room despite the press depicting them as rivals. Astria performed in the Tokyo Music Festival in 1988, singing one of her songs and participating in a rendition of the Japanese-language song "Hana". In 1989, Astria released a rearranged version of "Jarum Neraka", the titular song of her second album. Towards the end of the 1980s, she acted in Biarkan Aku Cemburu (Let Me Be Jealous), after being invited by her neighbour Eddy D. Iskandar.

In 1999, Astria recorded a duet with Chrisye, entitled "Khayalku" ("My Imagination"), for the rearranged version of the 1977 album Badai Pasti Berlalu. In 2001, she was one of four musicians who established the Bandung School of Higher Musical Learning (Perguruan Tinggi Musik Bandung), which teaches both music and business aspects of the music industry. Two years later, during a promotional tour for her recent album Maafkan (Forgive), a fan was killed in a fight at a concert in Cirebon.

== Legacy ==
Two of Astria's songs were listed by Rolling Stone Indonesia in their 2009 List of the 150 Best Indonesian Songs of All Time. "Jarum Neraka", from the album of the same name, was ranked 54th, while "Tangan-Tangan Setan", from the album of the same name, was ranked 57th. Ian Antono described her as "the best female pop rock singer Indonesia has ever seen". (Note: Original: "... penyanyi pop rock wanita terhebat yang pernah dimiliki Indonesia ...")

== Personal life ==
Astria's first marriage was to Satria Kamal, the son of a politician, in 1992. The couple had two children before their divorce in the early 2000s. Astria then married Hendra Priyadi, the owner of a music studio, in 2003. The couple divorced a year later. She married Gunanta Afrina in 2005; the couple have one child together. Astria is a Muslim.
