= Roy Marten =

Indonesian actor

- Born: Roy Wicaksono Abdul Salam; 1 March 1952 (age 74); Salatiga, Central Java
- Occupation: Actor
- Years active: 1974–present
- Notable work: Cintaku di Kampus Biru; Badai Pasti Berlalu
- Spouses: Farida Sabtijastuti (divorced) Anna Maria Sofiana (m. 1985)
- Children: 6

Theodoros Roy Marten (born Roy Wicaksono Abdul Salam, 1 March 1952) is an Indonesian actor.

== Life and career ==
Marten was born as Roy Wicaksono Abdul Salam on 1 March 1952 in Salatiga, Central Java, Indonesia. In 1974, he made his acting debut in the film Bobby. He achieved fame with his starring role in Cintaku di Kampus Biru (My Love on the Blue Campus), a 1976 film which was adapted from the Ashari Siregar's novel. One of his more notable roles from the time is as the lead actor of Teguh Karya's 1977 film Badai Pasti Berlalu (The Storm Will Surely Pass). By the end of the 1970s, he was one of the five highest paid actors in Indonesia.

Marten was arrested in 2006 for drug use. He was found in possession of two packages of crystal meth, weighing a combined total of 2.6 grams (0.092 oz), at a friend's house. Marten was sentenced to ten months in prison, but was released on 1 October 2006 after serving nine months. Marten was arrested for possession again in Surabaya while promoting an anti-drug campaign in 2008; three others were also arrested. In April Marten was sentenced to three years in prison; however, he was released in May 2010.

In 2010, after his release from prison, Marten played in Selimut Berdarah (The Bloody Blanket). In 2012 he played mob boss Sonny Wibisono in Dilema (Dilemma), a collaboration by four directors.

== Personal life ==
Marten's first marriage was to Farida Sabtijastuti. Later, the couple got divorced. On 1 April 1985, Marten married Anna Maria Sofiana, a Malay Indonesian Muslim model who has converted to Christianity after their marriage. Together they have six children, two of whom – Gading Marten and Gibran Marten – are also actors. He and his family are Eastern Orthodox Christians.

== Filmography ==
- Bobby (1974)
- Rahasia Gadis (A Maiden's Secret; 1975)
- Cintaku di Kampus Biru (My Love at the Blue Campus; 1976)
- Kenangan Desember (December Memories; 1976)
- Sesuatu Yang Indah (Something Beautiful; 1976)
- Tinggal Bersama (Living Together; 1977)
- Badai Pasti Berlalu (The Storm Will Surely Pass; 1977)
- Kembang-Kembang Plastik (Plastic Flowers; 1977)
- Aula Cinta (Hall of Love; 1977)
- Akibat Pergaulan Bebas (Results of Free Sex; 1977)
- Pengalaman Pertama (First Experience; 1977)
- Secerah Senyum (As Bright as a Smile; 1977)
- Kekasihku (My Dear; 1977)
- Christina (1977)
- Kugapai Cintamu (I'm Reaching for Your Love; 1977)
- Guna-Guna Istri Muda (A Young Wife's Spells; 1977)
- Jangan Menangis Mama (Don't Cry, Mama; 1977)
- Roda-Roda Gila (Crazy Wheels; 1978)
- Rahasia Perkawinan (Secret to Marriage; 1978)
- Si Genit Poppy (Poppy the Flirt; 1978)
- Laki-Laki Binal (Wild Men; 1978)
- Akibat Godaan (Results of Temptation; 1978)
- Nafas Perempuan (A Woman's Breath; 1978)
- Pembalasan Guna-Guna Istri Muda (Response to a Young Wife's Spells; 1978)
- Musim Bercinta (Season for Love; 1978)
- Dewi Malam (Night Goddess; 1978)
- Ombaknya Laut Mabuknya Cinta (The Ocean's Waves, Love's Intoxication; 1978)
- Antara Dia dan Aku (Between He and I; 1979)
- Romantika Remaja (Teen Romance; 1979)
- Kecupan Pertama (First Kiss; 1979)
- Remaja Idaman (The Perfect Teen; 1979)
- Wanita Segala Zaman (A Woman for the Ages; 1979)
- Ali Topan Turun ke Jalan (Ali Topan Goes to the Streets; 1979)
- Bayang-Bayang Kelabu (Shadows in the Fog; 1979)
- Kabut Sutra Ungu (Mist of Purple Silk; 1980)
- Bukan Sandiwara (Not a Stageplay; 1980)
- Permainan Bulan Desember (December's Games; 1980)
- Beningnya Hati Seorang Gadis (A Maiden's Clear Heart; 1980)
- Di Sini Cinta Pertama Kali Bersemi (Here Love Bloomed for the First Time; 1980)
- Tiga Dara Mencari Cinta (Three Girls Looking for Love; 1980)
- Bandish (Closure; 1980)
- Lembah Duka (Valley of Sorrow; 1981)
- Fajar Yang Kelabu (A Foggy Dawn; 1981)
- Bila Hati Wanita Menjerit (When a Woman's Heart Screams; 1981)
- Gadis Marathon (Marathon Girl; 1981)
- Bawalah Aku Pergi (Take Me Away; 1982)
- Pasukan Berani Mati (Soldiers Are Willing to Die; 1982)
- Tapak-Tapak Kaki Wolter Monginsidi (In the Footsteps of Wolter Monginsidi; 1982)
- Musang Berjanggut (The Bearded Fox; 1983)
- Rahasia Buronan (A Convict's Secret; 1983)
- Budak Nafsu (Slave to Lust; 1983)
- Walter Monginsidi (1983)
- Kontraktor (Contractor; 1984)
- Kerikil-Kerikil Tajam (Sharp Pebbles; 1984)
- Hatiku Bukan Pualam (My Heart is Not a Marble; 1985)
- Hell Raiders (1985)
- Madu dan Racun (Honey and Poison; 1985)
- Boleh Rujuk Asal (Reconciliation; 1986)
- Tinggal Sesaat Lagi (Just A Little Longer; 1986)
- Takdir Marina (Marina's Fate; 1986)
- Gema Hati Bernyanyi (Echoes of a Singing Heart; 1987)
- Langit Takkan Runtuh (The Sky Will Not Fall; 1987)
- American Hunter (1988)
- Pemburu Berdarah Dingin (Cold Blooded Killer; 1988)
- Biarkan Aku Cemburu (Let Me Be Jealous; 1988)
- Suami (Husband; 1988)
- Nyoman Cinta Merah Putih (Nyoman Loves the Flag; 1989)
- Jeram Cinta (Cascading Love; 1989)
- Pertempuran Segi Tiga (Three Sided Battle; 1990)
- Triple Cross (1990)
- Angel of Fury (1993)
- Bella Vista (Beautiful View, 1994)
- Mengejar Mas-Mas (Chasing Men; 2007)
- Selimut Berdarah (The Bloody Blanket; 2010)
- Catatan Si Boy (Boy's Notebook; 2011)
- Dilema (Dilemma; 2012)
- Sampai Ujung Dunia (To the Ends of the Earth; 2012)
- Cinta 7 Susun (Love 7 Flats; 2013)
- The Raid 2: Berandal (The Raid 2; 2014)
- The Secret: Suster Ngesot Urban Legend (2019)
- Toko Barang Mantan (2020)

== Awards and nominations ==
Year	Award	Category	Work	Result
1983	Indonesian Film Festival	Citra Award for Best Leading Actor	Tapak-tapak Kaki Wolter Monginsidi	Nominated
2012	Maya Award	Best Actor in a Leading Role	Dilema	Nominated
