= Marga T =

Indonesian writer (1943–2023)

- Born: Tjoa Liang Tjoe; 23 October 1943; Djakarta, Japanese-occupied Dutch East Indies
- Died: 17 August 2023 (aged 79); Malvern, Victoria, Australia
- Education: Trisakti University
- Occupation: Author
- Writing career
- Pen name: Marga T
- Language: Indonesian
- Period: 1969–20??
- Genres: Romance, Children's

Marga Tjoa (27 January 1943 – 17 August 2023) was an Indonesian popular romance and children's literature writer better known by the pen name Marga T. One of Indonesia's most prolific writers, she first became well known in 1971 for her serial Karmila which was published as a book in 1973 and later made into a film. As of 2006, she had published 38 novels.

== Biography ==
Marga Tjoa was born Tjoa Liang Tjoe (Chinese: 蔡良珠; Hokkien: Chhoà Liâng-chu) to a Catholic Chinese Indonesian (peranakan) family in Jakarta in 1943. She started writing young and by age 21, had published her first short story, "Room 27" (Indonesian: Kamar 27). It was followed by her first book in 1969, a children's story titled My Home is My Castle (Indonesian: Rumahku adalah Istanaku). During this time she was also educated as a physician at Trisakti University.

Tjoa became famous after first novel, Karmila, was published in 1971. In 1972 she followed Karmila's success with The Storm Will Surely Pass (Indonesian: Badai Pasti Berlalu), which was serialized in Kompas between 5 June and 2 September 1972, with a novelized version being published in 1974. Both novels were adapted into movies, with Badai Pasti Berlalu going on to win four Citra awards. This early success convinced her to continue writing.

During the late 1970s and throughout the 1980s and 1990s, Tjoa published more popular novels, including An Illusion (Indonesian: Sebuah Ilusi), The Red Saga (Indonesian: Saga Merah), and Doctor Sabara's Secret (Indonesian: Rahasia Dokter Sabara). She also published some collections of short stories, including Love Song (Indonesian: Lagu Cinta) and Monik.

In 2004, Tjoa published A Bud of Hope (Indonesian: Sekuntum Nozomi) to commemorate the eighth anniversary of the 1998 Jakarta Riots. It deals with the violence and rape of Chinese women during the riots.

As of 2006, Tjoa had written 80 short stories, 50 pieces of children's literature, and 38 novels.

Tjoa lived in Central Jakarta. She died on 17 August 2023, at the age of 79 after being treated at Cabrini Hospital in Malvern, Australia

== Chinese-Indonesian identity ==
Tjoa was seen as trying to distance herself from her Chinese-Indonesian background during a period of legislation regarding Chinese culture in Indonesia, as evidenced by her use of a neutral pen name and a general disregard for Chinese culture and problems in her literary works. Her diction is also described as "identical to that of indigenous writers." As a result, many readers do not realize that Tjoa was Chinese-Indonesian.

== Selected works ==
Her works include:

Year	Title	Title in English	Notes
1969	Rumahku adalah Istanaku	My Home is my Castle	First novel
1971	Karmila	Karmila	
1974	Badai Pasti Berlalu	The Storm Will Surely Pass	Originally published as a serial in Kompas in 1972
1976	Gema Sebuah Hati	A Heart's Echo	
1976	Bukan Impian Semusim	Not a Seasonal Dream	
1977	Sepotong Hati Tua	A Sliver of an Old Heart	
1979	Lagu Cinta	Love Song	A collection of short stories
1982	Monik	Monik	A collection of short stories
1982	Sebuah Ilusi	An Illusion	
1984	Fatamorgana	Fatamorgana	
1984	Saga Merah	Red Saga	
1984	Rahasia Dokter Sabara	Doctor Sabara's Secret	
1984	Bukit Gundaling	Gundaling Hill	
1986	Ketika Lonceng Berdentang: cerita misteri	When the Bell Tolls: A Mystery	
1987	Saskia	Saskia	Part one of a trilogy
1987	Untukmu Nana	For You, Nana	
1987	Setangkai Edelweiss	A Stalk of Edelweiss	A sequel to Gema Sebuah Hati
1987	Sembilu Bermata Dua	The Two-Bladed Knife	
1987	Kishi	Kishi	Part two of a trilogy
1987	Batas Masa Silam: Balada Sungai Musi	The Edge of the Past: A Balad for the Musi River	
1987	Oteba	Oteba	The final book in a trilogy
1987	Ranjau-ranjau Cinta	Love's Traps	
1988	Tesa	Tesa	
1988	Di Hatimu Aku Berlabuh	In Your Heart, I Am Anchored	
1988	Sekali dalam 100 Tahun	Once in 100 Years	A collection of satires
1990	Istana di Kaki Langit	The Palace at the Sky's Feet	
1991	Namamu Terukir di Hatiku	Your Name is Carved in My Heart	
1991	Sonata Masa Lalu	A Sonnet to the Past	
1992	Berkerudung Awan Mendung	Veiled in Grey Skies	
1992	Seribu Tahun Kumenanti	I Will Wait for a Thousand Years	
1992	Rintihan Pilu Kalbuku	My Heart's Melancholic Moan	
1994	Sepagi Itu Kita Berpisah	We Separated that Early	
1995	Dikejar Bayang-Bayang	Chased by Shadows	
1995	Melodi Sebuah Rosetta	A Rosetta's Melody	
1999	Matahari Tengah Malam	The Midnight Sun	
1998	Didera Sesal dan Duka	Scourged by Regrets and Grief	
1998	Dicabik Benci dan Cinta	Torn Between Love and Hate	
1999	Amulet dari Nubia	The Amulet from Nubia	
2001	Dipalu Kecewa dan Putus Asa	Hammered by Disappointment and Despair	
2003	Dibakar Malu dan Rindu	Burned by Shame and Longing	
2002–2006	Sekuntum Nozomi	A Bud of Hope	Four works
