= Alexander Nedoshivin =

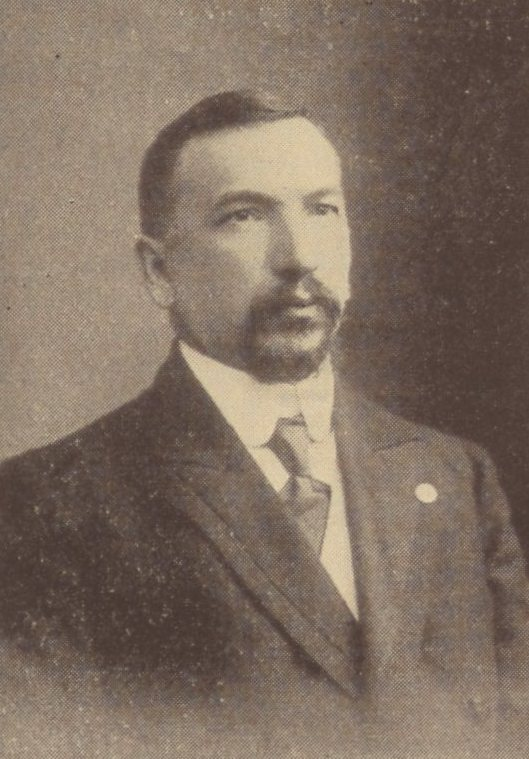
Alexander Nedoshivin

Aleksandr Mixaylovich Nedoshivin (March 14, 1868 in Kazan – March, 1943, Russian Orthodox Cemetery, Nice) was 27 years a tax specialist at the Ministry of Finance in Imperial Russia, later a lawyer for 10 years. In 1920 he left the country and became a priest in 1927. In 1928 he became priest of the Russian Orthodox Church in Leipzig.

In 1910 he learned Esperanto and was one of the founders of the Esperanto Society at Kaunas, Lithuania. In Saint Petersburg he founded the International Esperanto Chamber of Commerce (Internacian Esperantan Komercan Ĉambron) which received subsidy. His work for Esperanto was supported by his wife (died 1926) and his daughter.
