= Rhenald Kasali =

Indonesian academic and businessman

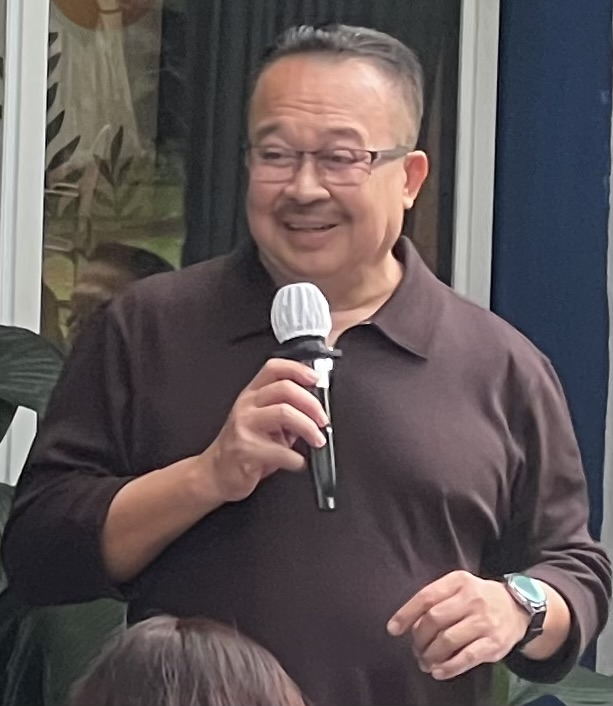
Kasali in 2025.

Rhenald Kasali (born in Jakarta, August 13, 1960) is an academic, businessman and writer from Indonesia. He is a management science professor at the Faculty of Economics and Business, University of Indonesia. Kasali was confirmed as a professor on 4 July 2009.

== Career ==
He holds a Ph.D. from the University of Illinois at Urbana-Champaign.

Around 2010s, Kasali was the chairman of postgraduate program for management science at the Faculty of Economics (currently known as the Faculty of Economics and Business), University of Indonesia. He is also a visiting lecturer for Sam Ratulangi University, Tanjungpura University, Udayana University, and University of Lampung.

In addition to his work as an academic, he is also a businessman and writer. His books are about business.

== Books ==
His books include:

- Membidik Pasar Indonesia: Segmentasi, Targeting dan Positioning (Looking at Indonesian Market: Segmentation, Targeting and Positioning), Gramedia Pustaka Utama (1998)
- Sukses Melakukan Presentasi (Conducting Successful Presentations), Gramedia Publisher (2000)
- Myelin, Mobilisasi Intangibles Menjadi Kekuatan Perubahan (Myelin: Intangibles Mobilization as the Force of Changes), Gramedia Pustaka Utama (2010)
- Wirausaha Muda Mandiri (Independent Young Entrepreneur), Gramedia Pustaka Utama (2010)
- Out of the Crisis: Building Strength Through New Core Belief and Values.
- "Cracking Zone" (Revolusi gaya hidup ketika income perkapita kita menembus US$3,000 dan bagaimana menangkap peluang ini) Gramedia Pustaka, 2010).

== Honours ==
- Satyalancana Karya Satya, 3rd Class – 2004
