= Albar (car) =

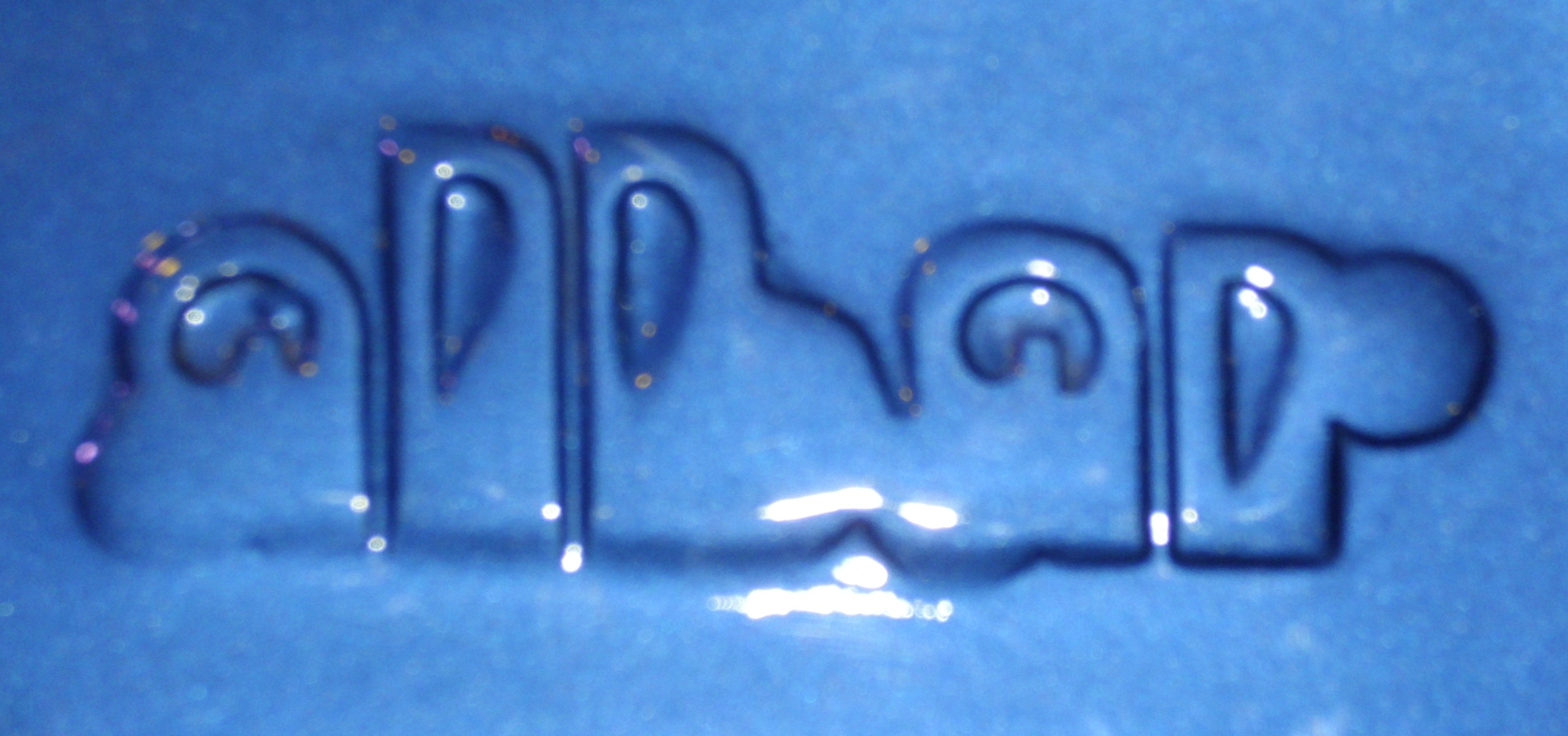
Albar emblem

Albar is a Swiss car maker, built since 1978 in Buochs by Alois Barmettler.

Barmettler had for some time made Dune Buggy and cross country conversions based on the VW Beetle.

In the early 1980s he moved on to make a coupé styled car with two-seater glass fibre body made in Austria. They were sold in Switzerland as the Albar Jet and Austria as the Strato.

In 1982 he began making the open Sonic model, which no longer relied on the Beetle floor pan but had a proper space frame. Later versions could have VW Straight-4 or Renault 25 engines. A fixed head coupé version was also made.

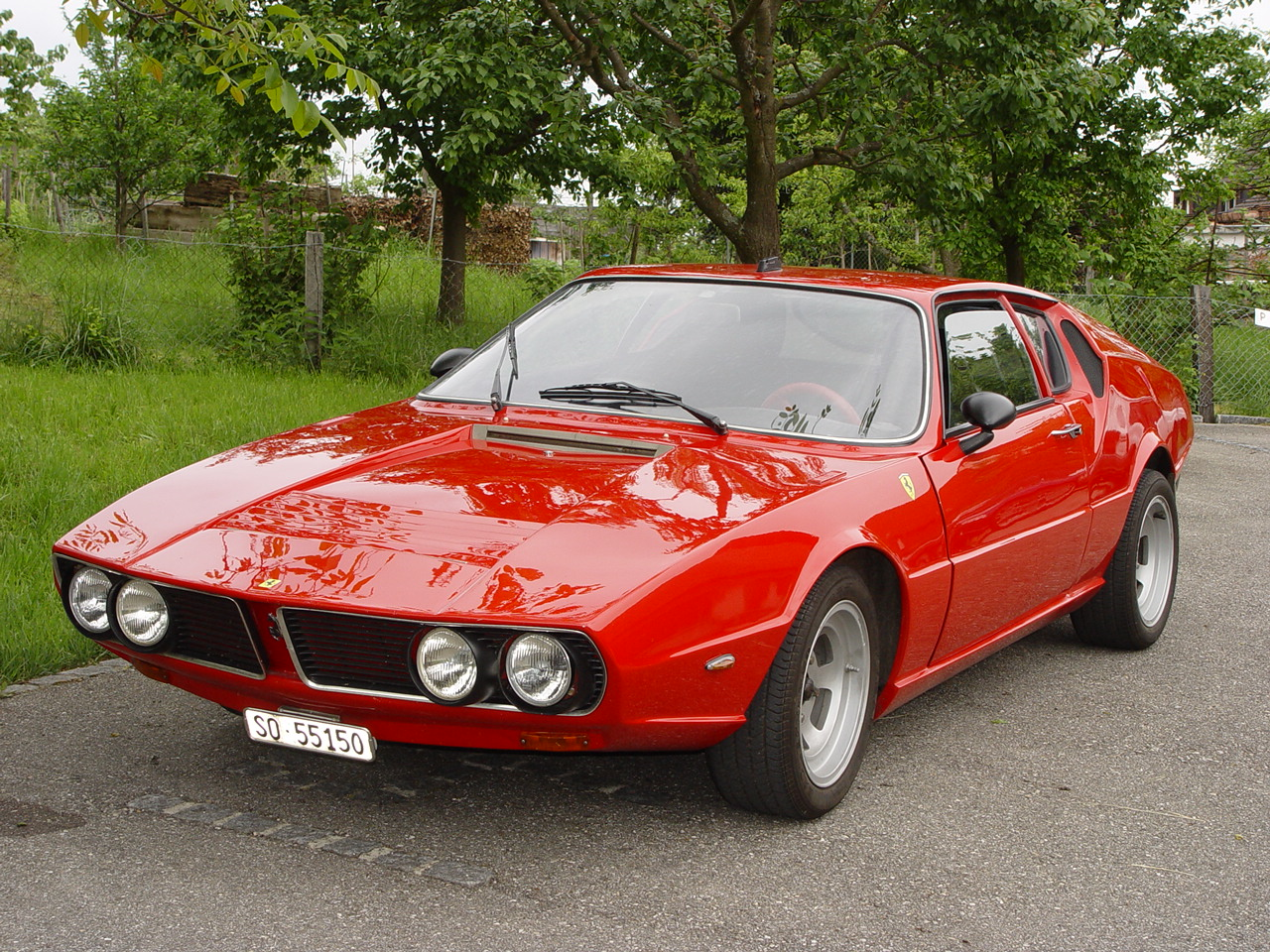
Albar Jet

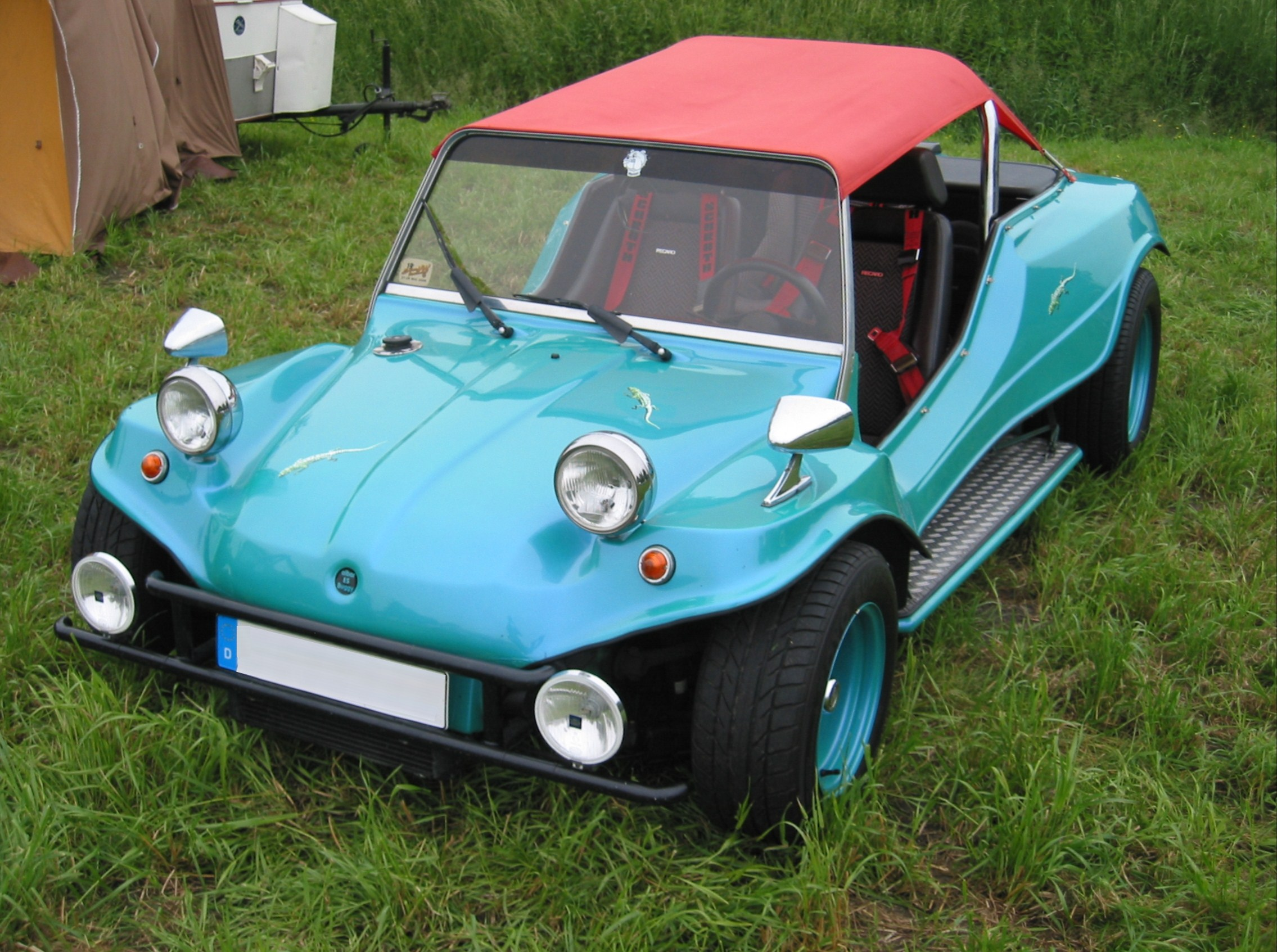
Albar Buggy
