= Gading Marten =

Indonesian actor and presenter

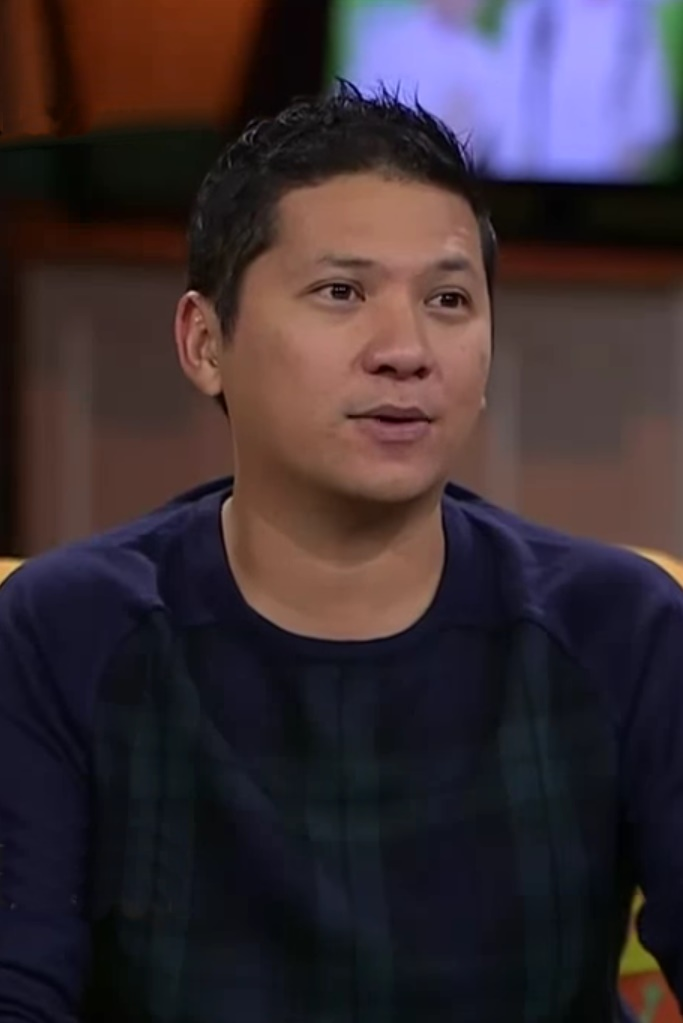
- Marten in March 2017.
- Born: Angling Gading; 8 May 1982 (age 44)
- Other names: Laurentios, Walkot Andara
- Occupations: Actor singer presenter model President Persik Kediri; President RANS Simba Bogor
- Spouse: Gisella Anastasia (m. 2013; div. 2019)
- Children: Gempita Nora Marten (2015) (daughter)
- Parent(s): Roy Marten (father); Farida Sabtijastuti (mother); Anna Maria Marten (stepmother)
- Family: Monique Marten (sister); Aline Marten (sister); Galih Marten (brother); Merari Marten (sister); Gibran Marten (brother)
- Awards: 1 Citra Awards

Angling Gading (born 8 May 1982), better known by his stage name Gading Marten, is an Indonesian actor, presenter and former footballer. He is the elder brother of Gibran Marten, an Indonesian actor and singer.

== Early life ==
Gading Marten was born on 8 May 1982 in Jakarta, Indonesia, to Farida Sabtijastuti A. Kristijono (6 February 1954 – 1 October 2022) and Roy Marten (born 1 March 1952).

His mother Kristijono died at RS Polri Sukanto in Kramat Jati, East Jakarta, on 1 October 2022 at the age of 68.

== Career ==
As a footballer, Marten used to play for Persitara North Jakarta. In 2004, he followed his father, Roy Marten, into the world of entertainment. He is well known for starring many teen soap operas, as well as a guest on several television shows and also as a presenter.

In the 2018 Indonesian Film Festival, Marten got his first Citra Award for Best Leading Actor for his role in the film Love for Sale. He then appeared in Crazy Awesome Teachers.

== Personal life ==
Marten graduated from Atmajaya University Jakarta in March 2005 with a bachelor's degree in management. On 10 April 2012, he met Gisella Anastasia, a singer, in a venue of one TV station. They married on 14 September 2013 at Tirta Luhur Church, Uluwatu, Bali, and had a daughter, Gempita Nora Marten, born on 16 January 2015. Marten and Gisella divorced on 23 January 2019.

He is practicing Orthodox Christianity of the Eastern Orthodox Church with sacrament name Laurentios.

== Filmography ==
=== Film ===
Year	Title	Role	Notes
2008	Love	Arif	
2009	Wakil Rakyat	Abimanyu	
2009	Anak Setan	Lano	
2010	London Virginia	Chandra/Sandra	
2010	Laskar Pemimpi	Kapten Hadi Sugito	
2011	Get Married 3	Karyawan	
2012	Test Pack	Zuki	
2012	Cinta di Saku Celana	Roy	
2012	Sampai Ujung Dunia	Gilang	
2015	Kakak		
2017	Susah Sinyal	Marco	
2018	Love for Sale	Richard Achmad	Winner — Citra Award for Best Actor
2020	Crazy Awesome Teachers	Taat Pribadi	

== Soap operas ==
- Kisah Sedih di Hari Minggu
- Hingga Akhir Waktu
- Liontin
- ABG
- Luv
- Si Cantik dan Si Buruk Rupa
- Aku Bukan Rio
- Manusia Bodoh
- Putri yang Terbuang
- Jelita
- Safira
- 3 Semprul Mengejar Surga
- Malu Malu Mau

== FTV ==
- Beauty & The Lutung Kasarung (2012) as Tommy
- No Woman No Cry (2012) as himself
- I Love You But I Hate You (2012) as himself
- Gembel Gembel Gombal: 3G (2012) as himself
- Tiga Semprul Mengejar Surga sebagai Gading
- Gombal Gombal Gading (2012) as himself
- Malu Malu Mau (2012) as himself
- Plis Jadikan Aku Kekasihmu (2012) as himself
- Ganteng Ganteng Gokil (2012) as himself
- Cinta di Kost-An Semprul (2013) as himself
- Bengkel Cinta Semprul (2013) as himself
- Ketemu Jodoh di Inbox (2013)
- Ada Cinta Di Rumah Susun (2015) as himself

== TV Programs ==
- Inbox SCTV
- Pesbukers Antv
- Odong Odong Global TV
- The Dance Icon Indonesia SCTV
- So Semprul SCTV
- Comedy Night Live NET.
- Stand Up Comedy Academy Indosiar
- Stand Up Comedy Club Indosiar
- Celebrity Squares NET.
- Live With Trio Lestari Trans TV

== Commercial ==
- SAMSUNG Galaxy J1 (2015)

== Discography ==
- Yang Tak Retak (2011)

=== Song charts ===
- Tak Ada Gading Yang Tak Retak
- Bertahan
- Merindu
- Tak Ingin Sendiri
- Biarlah (feat. Killing Me Inside)
- Merindu (versi asli)
