= Anna Maria Marten =

Indonesian model

- Born: Anna Maria Sofiana; 11 March 1964 (age 61); Central Java, Indonesia
- Occupation: Model
- Years active: 1980 – present
- Spouse: Roy Marten (1985–present)
- Children: Monique Marten (stepdaughter); Aline Marten (stepdaughter); Galih Marten (stepson); Gading Marten (stepson); Merari Marten (daughter); Gibran Marten (son)
- Parent(s): Hasan Kartadi Kusuma (father); Emma Natadi (mother)

Anna Maria Sofiana (born 11 March 1964), commonly known as Anna Maria Marten, is an Indonesian model and wife of Indonesian actor Roy Marten.

== Career ==
A Malay-Sundanese woman who started as a model in the beginning of the 1980s, she is the seventh of eight children of Hasan Kartadi and Emma Natadi. She converted to Christianity after her marriage with Roy Marten in 1985. She kept active in her modelling career until the beginning of the 1990s. In 2006, she resumed her career as a model. At first, she was chosen as a new commercial star of a herbal product preceded by Sophia Latjuba, Rhenald Kasali, Wynne Prakusya, Setiawan Djodi, Dewa Band, Subronto Laras, Nia Ramadhani, Nana and Naysila Mirdad, Ikang Fawzi and Marissa Haque, Gunawan, Cici Tegal, also Lula Kamal.

== Personal life ==
Marten married her husband on 1 April 1985, although both did not receive the blessing of her parents. They first met during a fashion show in 1984. Although, Roy Marten was a widower with four children with an age difference of about 12 years, they did not consider that an obstacle to their union.

She has two children Merari Sabati and Gibran Marten with Marten, as well as four children from her husband's previous marriage, Monique, Aline, Galih, and Gading Marten.

She, along with her family are Orthodox Christians and members of the Eastern Orthodox Church.
