= Ahmad Albar =

Indonesian rock musician

Ahmad Syech Albar
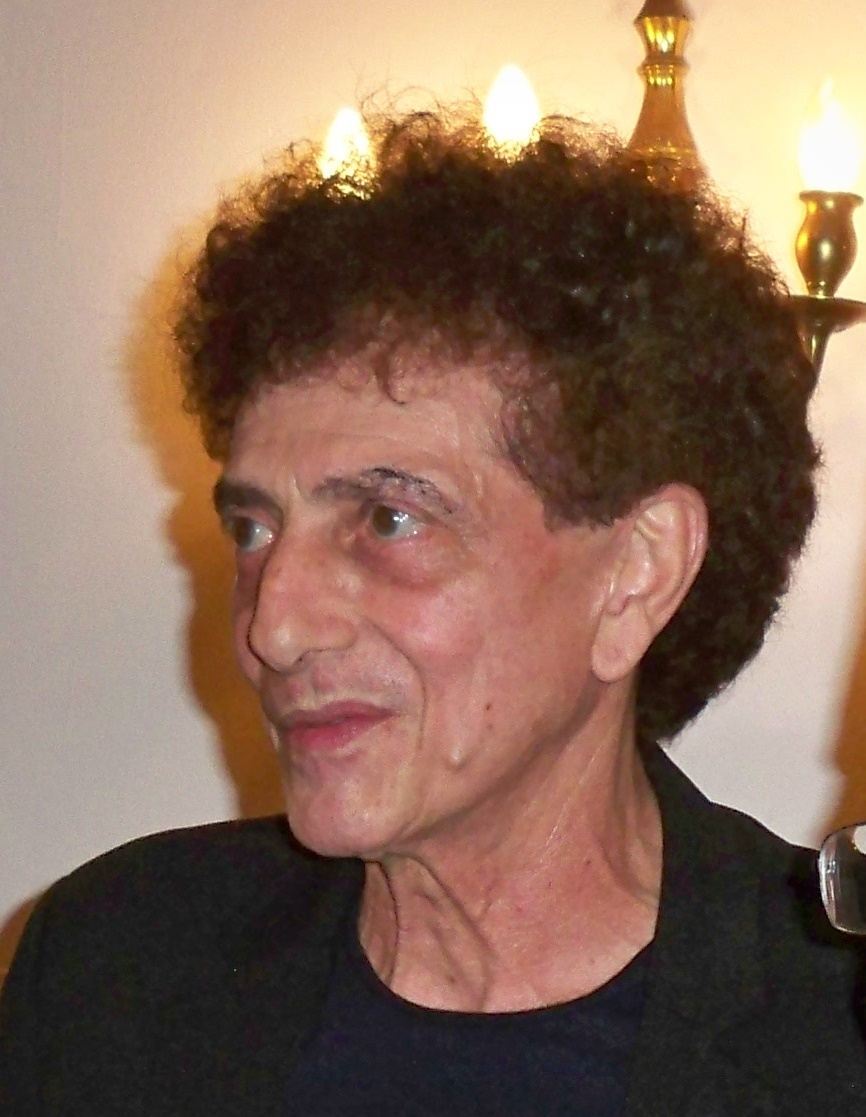

Background information
- Also known as: Ahmad Albar
- Born: Ahmad Syech Albar; 16 July 1946 (age 80); Surabaya, East Java, Indonesia
- Genres: Rock, pop, hard rock, dangdut, pop kreatif, heavy metal, progressive rock, glam metal, pop rock
- Occupation: Vocalist
- Years active: 1958–present
- Labels: HP Record; Musica Studio's
- Member of: God Bless

Ahmad Syech Albar (born 16 July 1946), is an Indonesian rock musician and vocalist. He is the founding member of God Bless.

== Biography ==
=== Early life and career ===
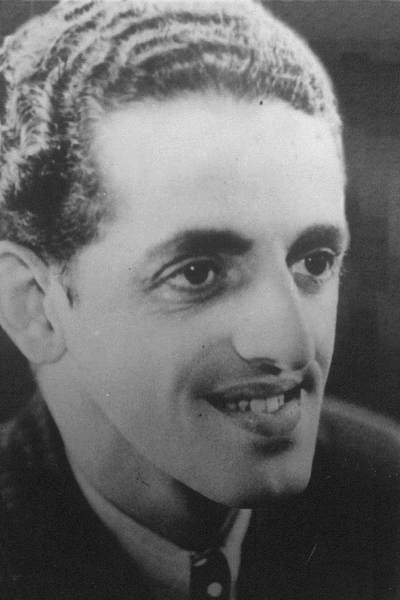
Syech Albar c. 1939, father of Ahmad Albar

Albar was born in Surabaya, East Java on 16 July 1946 to Syech Albar and his wife Farida Alhasni. Both of his parents were of Arab descent. He was the couple's fourth child. In 1958 he played in the film Djenderal Kantjil (General Kancil).

Albar moved to the Netherlands in 1965. In 1970 he sang "Don't Spoil My Day" and "Tell Me the World" with Clover Leaf, which charted. After his return to Indonesia, he founded God Bless with Jockie Soerjoprajogo, Fuad Hassan, Donny Fattah, and his friend from Clover Leaf, Ludwig Lemans; Albar was lead vocalist. The band's first performance was in Taman Ismail Marzuki on 5 May 1973, and on 16 August 1973 they held the Summer 28 concert, the first (and, as of 2004, largest) open-air concert in Indonesia. The band, with Albar, also played in the 1973 comedy Ambisi (Ambition), directed by Nya Abbas Akup.

=== God Bless ===
In 1975, Albar and God Bless opened for Deep Purple at a concert in Jakarta. On 27 September 1975, Albar appeared on the cover of Tempo, with a full feature on him inside; the coverage compared his costume to Zorro's and described him spinning the microphone over his head as if he were competing in a hammer throw event. Other magazines, such as Junior, Aktuil, and Top, soon followed; Aktuil named him the best vocalist of 1976.

In 1976, Albar and God Bless released their first album, Huma di atas Bukit (House on the Hill). The titular song was an adaptation of "Firth Of Fifth", from Genesis' 1973 album Selling England by the Pound. The same year Albar played in Laila Majenun (Laila is Possessed), directed by Sjumandjaja; "Huma di atas Bukit" was used as its theme song.

=== Duo Kribo and other projects ===
The following year, Albar recorded "Neraka Jahanam" ("Blasted Hell"), a duet with Ucok Harahap released on an album of the same name; the two called themselves Duo Kribo, based on their frizzy hair. The titular song was based in the concept of original sin. That same year he recorded "Jelaga" ("Soot"), a winner of Prambors FM's Teenage Song Writing Competition.

Duo Kribo released their second album, Pelacur Tua (Old Prostitute), in 1978. Albar was then invited by Guruh Soekarnoputra to perform the song "Anak Jalanan" ("Street Children") at Guruh's Swara Mahardhika concert; it ran from 6 to 7 January 1979. Later in 1979 he and Harahap released their third album, Panggung Sandiwara (Theatre Stage), featuring compositions by former God Bless member Ian Antono and lyrics by poet Taufiq Ismail. He also recorded a dangdut album, Zakia, that year; the album featured six compositions by Albar and three by other artists, including Antono and Titiek Puspa.

Albar later appeared in the film Irama Cinta (Rhythm of Love) along with dangdut singer Elvy Sukaesih; the pair sang five songs together. Afterwards, in 1980, God Bless released their second album, Cermin (Mirror). With God Bless later going into limbo, Albar recorded two solo albums, Dunia Huru-Hara (World of Commotion) and Syair Kehidupan (Poems of Life); he also recorded an album with Fariz RM, entitled Secita Cerita (An Idea for a Story). In 1983, Albar sang "Rahasia Semesta" ("Secret of the Universe") at the 11th National Pop Music Festival.

In early 1990, Albar formed Gong 2000 with Yaya Muktio, Harry Anggoman, Donny Fattah, and Ian Antono. Their first concert, held in Senayan, Jakarta, on 26 October 1991, attracted 100,000 viewers. Together the group released four albums, Bara Timur (Ember of the East; 1991), Gong Live (1992), Laskar (Screen; 1993), and Prahara (Tempest; 2000). During the same period he was still active with God Bless, releasing Semut Hitam (Black Ants; 1988), Raksasa (Monster; 1989), and Apa Kabar? (What's Up?; 1997).

=== Focus on God Bless ===
In 2003, Albar and Jockie had a large fight which led to Jockie leaving the group. According to a 2011 interview with Jockie, Jockie and some fellow band members had been discussing Albar's drug habit when they decided to ask Albar to abandon drugs. When Jockie did so, Albar reportedly pulled a pistol on him. Guitarist Ian Antono confirmed that a pistol was involved, but he thought it could be a toy; he stated that the argument flared up when Jockie insulted Albar's family.

On 7 February 2004, Albar and a group of Indonesian performers, including Glenn Fredly, Armand Maulana of Gigi, and Duta of Sheila on 7, held a concert to commemorate the founding of the Malaysian rock band Search. At the end of the concert the singers sang "Rumah Kita" ("Our House"), from Semut Hitam.

In November 2007, Albar was arrested for possessing ecstasy and hiding a drug dealer. Tried in June 2008, he was convicted and sentenced to eight months in prison. He was paroled in July for good behaviour and counting previous time served.

In the middle of 2009, Albar and God Bless released 36th. Later, in October of that year, Albar participated in a tribute concert to Chrisye, entitled "Chrisye: A Night to Remember". With God Bless, in mid-2010 he went on a national tour sponsored by PT Multi Bintang Indonesia Niaga. In June 2011, the band performed for Hard Rock Cafe Jakarta's 40th anniversary. The following month, from 22 to 24 July 2011, he and God Bless performed at the InterMusic Java Rockin' Land alongside The Cranberries and Neon Trees.

== Legacy ==
In a 2009 issue, Rolling Stone Indonesia ranked several songs which Albar sang or wrote as being among the 150 best Indonesian songs of all time. God Bless' song "Kehidupan" ("Life"), which he sang, was ranked 8th, while "Rumah Kita" ("Our Home") was ranked 22nd. Duo Kribo's song "Neraka Jahanam" was ranked 18th, while "Panggung Sandiwara" was ranked 21st. Gong 2000's song "Kepada Perang" ("To War") was ranked 114th.

== Personal life ==
Albar married Rini S. Bono on 28 April 1978; she had previously acted with him in Laila Majenun, with whom he has three children. They divorced on 30 September 1994. In May 2011 it was reported that he would be marrying Dewi, his girlfriend, while going on the hajj.

Albar is a maternal half-brother of dangdut singer Camelia Malik and father of actor Fachri Albar. His sons Ozzy and Fachri Albar are also musicians, playing in the band Jibriel; his nephew Bagoes is also a member of the band.
