= Djakarta Artmosphere =

Annual concert in Jakarta, Indonesia

- Genre: A Limitless Variety
- Dates: November 20
- Locations: Jakarta, Indonesia
- Years active: 2009-Present
- Founders: G Productions
- Website: http://www.djakartartmosphere.com/

Djakarta Artmosphere, or Djaksphere in short, is an annual concert organized by G Production to promote the collaborations between artists that are not limited to a specific generation, genre and/or other artistic creations. The organizers of this concert interpret the name Djakarta as a symbol of a space to accommodate millions of souls from diverse backgrounds, both geographically and culturally. Moreover, Djakarta has become a place that is no longer synonymous with a particular ethnicity, religion, or skin color.

== History ==
=== Name Philosophy ===
The selection of employing the old spelling of Jakarta (i.e. Djakarta) in the concert's name aims to provide affirmation of the differences in the lifestyles of people in Jakarta over time. Hence, it intends to escape the impression that has been embedded in the word Jakarta as a dense, complicated, and exhausting city for its citizens.

As for Artmosphere, it simply is the merging of the words Art and Atmosphere. Its goal is to capture an artistic mood, an aura of expression of the soul, a feeling that manifests itself to each individual in the room along with their local identities, and bringing sense, perspective, and culture from the place they came from to the place they now inhabit. In other words, it acts as a vessel holding a variety of flavors, making it a place of mingle between the diverse cultures of Indonesia.

Djakarta Artmosphere slowly attempts to bring back the foundations of the spirit of equality in diversity using Music and Photography media. Djakarta Artmosphere 2009, with the theme "Egalitarian", marked the beginning of their long journey on interpreting such independence. Egalitarian represents a humble spirit: the spirit of respect for equality in the world of artistic diversity.

=== Early Success (Djakarta Artmosphere 2009) ===
In the year of 2009, Djakarta Artmosphere held their first event in the UpperRoom Jakarta, Annex Building. Their first show was a success: tickets were sold out with almost 2,000 people in attendance, despite the fact that the event was held on the same day as the Jak Jazz.

=== Tragedy In Padang ===
In 2009, an earthquake struck Padang leaving many people homeless. Some of the kids were out of school or had to attend school outdoors. This was a tragic time for the people of Indonesia.

=== Aftermath ===
After the event of Djakarta Artmosphere 2009, the crew visited Padang to donate all of its proceeds to the victims of the Padang earthquake. They were able to raise and donate a total of Rp 70,000,000, or $7,000, along with books and other school supplies.

== Collaborations/Line-Up ==
=== 2009 ===
==== Mini Stage ====
- Endah & Rhesa
- Gugun Blues Shelter
- Tembang Pribumi
- Anda with The Joints
- Angsa & Serigala
- GRIBS
- Brass Band TNI AD

==== Main Stage ====
- Vina Panduwinata
- Tika & The Dissidents
- Ebiet G. Ade
- SORE
- White Shoes And The Couples Company
- Fariz RM
- Oele Pattiselanno
- Doel Sumbang
- Efek Rumah Kaca
