= George Marten (cricketer, born 1840) =

English cricketer

Personal information
- Full name: George Nisbet Marten
- Born: 20 June 1840; Ghazipur, North Western Provinces, British India
- Died: 25 June 1905 (aged 65); Crowborough, Sussex, England
- Batting: Right-handed
- Relatives: George Marten (uncle)

Domestic team information
- Years: Team
- 1864–1869: Marylebone Cricket Club

Career statistics
Competition	First-class
Matches	4
Runs scored	50
Batting average	10.00
100s/50s	–/–
Top score	26
Catches/stumpings	2/–
- Source: Cricinfo, 10 August 2019

George Nisbet Marten JP (20 June 1840 – 25 August 1905) was an English first-class cricketer.

The son Thomas Powney Marten, he was born in British India at Ghazeepoor. He was educated in England at Harrow School, before going up to Pembroke College, Oxford. While studying at Oxford, Marten was commissioned as a lieutenant in the Hertfordshire Militia in March 1861. A year after graduating from Oxford in 1863, Marten made his debut in first-class cricket for the Marylebone Cricket Club against Middlesex at Lord's, while in 1865 he appeared for the Gentlemen of England against the Gentlemen of Middlesex. Four years later in 1869, he made two final appearances in first-class cricket for the MCC against Oxford University at Lord's, and Hampshire at Southampton. Marten scored 50 runs in his four matches, with a high score of 26. He was promoted to the rank of captain in the Hertfordshire Militia in March 1866.

By 1872 he had emigrated to Australia, where he lived on the Branscombe Plantation near Mackay, Queensland. He later returned to England with his wife, Annie. He was a justice of the peace, and was by profession a banker. Marten died at Crowborough in June 1905. His uncle, George Marten, was also a first-class cricketer.
