= Gibran Marten =

Indonesian actor and singer (born 1987)

- Born: Mahesa Gibran; 22 March 1987 (age 38); Jakarta, Indonesia.
- Education: Law
- Occupations: Actor; singer
- Years active: 2013–present
- Notable work: TEN: The Secret Mission (2016)
- Parents: Roy Marten (father); Anna Maria Marten (mother)

Mahesa Gibran (born 22 March 1987), known as Gibran Marten, is an Indonesian actor and singer.

== Life and career ==
Marten was born on 22 March 1987 (age 38) in Jakarta, Indonesia. He is son of Roy Marten, an Indonesian actor, and Anna Maria Marten, an Indonesian model. He is also known as the youngest brother of Gading Marten, an Indonesian artist and presenter. When Marten was still at college, he began his singing career by joining several bands and performed in pubs or several venues. He performed with his brother Gading Marten in one TV station program in 2011.

He began his acting career in 2014 with several opera soaps of TV stations, prior to joining several films such as Pacarku Anak Koruptor(2016) and TEN: The Secret Mission (2016).

== Personal life ==
Marten went to Atmajaya University, majoring in Law. He is an Orthodox Christian believer.

== Filmography ==
=== Film ===
Year	Title	Role	Note
2016	Pacarku Anak Koruptor	Matoa	Post Production
2016	TEN: The Secret Mission	Captain Dalton	Post Production

== TV Programs ==
- Inbox SCTV (December 2011)

== Discography ==
- Selingkuh (2011)

=== Song charts ===
- Selingkuh
