= Eros Djarot =

Indonesian songwriter, director, and politician

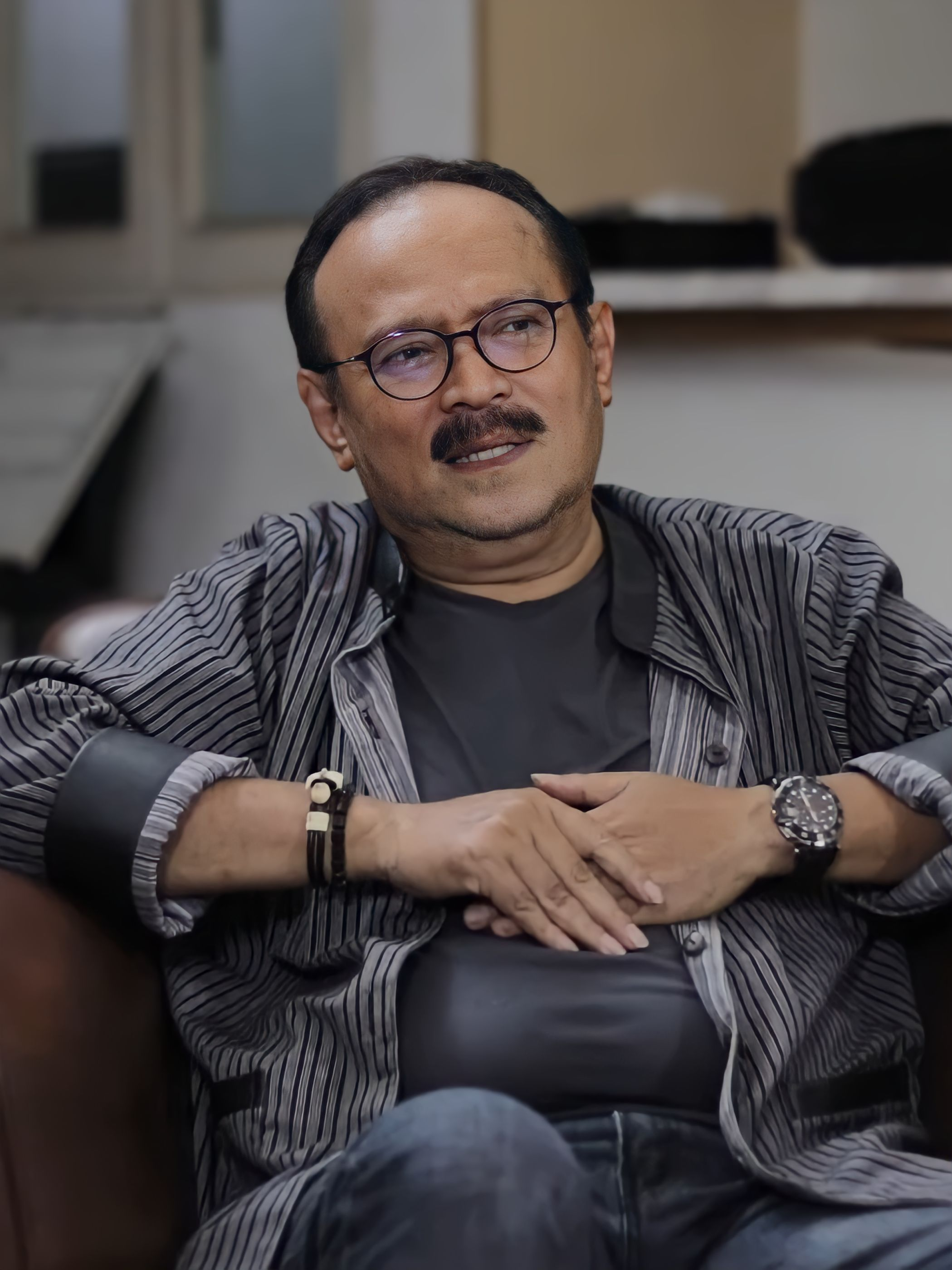
- Djarot in 2021
- Born: 22 July 1950 (age 76); Rangkasbitung, West Java (now Banten), Indonesia
- Education: Cologne University of Applied Sciences
- Occupations: Songwriter, director, politician
- Years active: 1976–present
- Notable work: Badai Pasti Berlalu (1977); Badai Pasti Berlalu (1977); Tjoet Nja' Dhien (1988)
- Political party: Indonesian National Populist Fortress Party

Erros Djarot (born 22 July 1950) is an Indonesian songwriter, director and politician. Beginning his music career with the soundtrack of Kawin Lari in 1976, Djarot became famous with the success of Badai Pasti Berlalu and its soundtrack album. In 1988, he directed Tjoet Nja' Dhien which received nine Citra Awards and was Indonesia's submission to the 62nd Academy Awards for the Academy Award for Best Foreign Language Film. In the late 1990s, Djarot entered politics, later forming the Bung Karno National Party in 2002.

== Biography ==
Djarot was born in Rangkasbitung, Banten on 22 July 1950. He attended elementary and junior high school in Yogyakarta, where he became active with the student organization Gerakan Siswa Nasional Indonesia. He then attended senior high school in Belitung, South Sumatra. In 1969, he went to Cologne, West Germany to study Industrial Engineering at the Cologne University of Applied Sciences.

In 1975, Djarot returned to Indonesia and formed the music group Barong. The following year, the American Embassy offered Djarot a chance to study at the London International Film School.

Djarot later became a soundtrack composer, working on films such as Kawin Lari (English: Elope, 1976), Badai Pasti Berlalu (English: The Storm Will Surely Pass, 1977), Usia 18 (English: Age of Eighteen, 1981), Ponirah Terpidana (English: The Convicted Ponirah, 1984), and Secangkir Kopi Pahit (English: A Cup of Bitter Coffee, 1986). Of these, his most popular was Badai Pasti Berlalu, which was released to critical acclaim, earning Djarot an award at the Indonesian Film Festival for Best Original Score; the soundtrack album of the same name, made under Djarot's direction, was eventually selected by Rolling Stone Indonesia as the best Indonesian album of all time.

Together with Chrisye and Jockie Soerjoprajogo, Erros produced a trilogy of albums, Resesi (English: Recession, 1983), Metropolitan (1984), and Nona (English: Miss, 1984). Of these, Resesi was received best, selling 350,000 copies and being certified silver.

In 1988, Djarot made his directorial debut with Tjoet Nja' Dhien, which received 9 Citra Awards, including Best Director, and was Indonesia's submission to the 62nd Academy Awards for the Academy Award for Best Foreign Language Film.

Djarot first entered politics with the Indonesian Democratic Party. However, after a disagreement with then-party leader Soerjadi, Djarot joined the Indonesian Democratic Party – Struggle (PDI-P). Due to disagreements with party leader Megawati Sukarnoputri, Djarot left the PDI-P and in 2002 formed his own party, the Bung Karno National Party based on Sukarnoism. The party later changed its name to the Freedom Bull National Party.

In 2008, Djarot's film Lastri, a love story about a Communist Gerwani member, was prevented from filming in Surakarta, Central Java due to the Surakarta police not granting permission; previously Djarot had received permission from the Indonesian National Police headquarters in Jakarta. Reports cited fears that Lastri would "spread communism". The Jakarta Post called the ban "a violation of the constitutional guarantees of freedom of speech".

== Works ==
=== Filmography ===
Year	Original title	English title	Role
1976	Kawin Lari	Elope	Soundtrack composer
1977	Badai Pasti Berlalu	The Storm Will Surely Pass	Soundtrack composer
1981	Usia 18	Age of Eighteen	Soundtrack composer
1984	Ponirah Terpidana	The Convicted Ponirah	Soundtrack composer
1986	Secangkir Kopi Pahit	A Cup of Bitter Coffee	Soundtrack composer
1988	Tjoet Nja' Dhien	Tjoet Nja' Dhien	Director

=== Discography ===
Year	Original title	English title
1977	Badai Pasti Berlalu	The Storm Will Surely Pass
1981	Resesi	Recession
1984	Metropolitan	Metropolitan
1984	Nona	Miss
