= Ian Antono =

Indonesian guitarist and songwriter (born 1950)

- Born: Jauw Hian Ling; 29 October 1950 (age 75); Malang, Indonesia
- Genres: Hard rock, heavy metal, glam metal, progressive rock, blues rock, pop kreatif, pop rock, arena rock
- Instrument: Guitar
- Years active: 1969–present
- Label: Sony Music BMG

Jusuf Antono Djojo or Ian Antono, born Jauw Hian Ling, (born 29 October 1950 in Malang, Indonesia) is an Indonesian guitarist and songwriter. He has collaborated with many other musicians, including Anggun, Iwan Fals, Nicky Astria, Doel Sumbang, Gito Rollies, Ebiet G Ade and Ikang Fawzi, he is best known as God Bless' lead guitarist since 1974. Another notable collaboration was Gong 2000, which was established in 1991 until 1996. Ian Antono was also recognized as one of the first rock guitarists in Indonesia. In 1999, Ian Antono was invited in a Formula-1 event, which was also a collaboration with G3 (Joe Satriani and Steve Vai) and rock legends, Jethro Tull.

== Childhood ==
Ian Antono was born in Malang, East Java, Indonesia to Darmo Poesoko Djojo (Jauw Thwan Too) & Siti Marijani (Sie Tien Nio) of Chinese-Indonesian Origin. Originally, he was interested in drumming and began to learn to play drums since his earlier years. However, later when he started to listen to The Shadows's music, he changed his mind and began to learn to play guitar.

== Music Experiences ==
=== Earlier ===
In 1970, Ian Antono went to Jakarta and joined a band called Bentoel which was a session band for singer Emilia Contessa and Trio The King. Later, his popularity was increased while he gained many experiences that made him join his present band, God Bless. He lived his life mostly as a Balinese musician performing Balinese orchestral music.

=== Professional career ===
The first step into professional music career was when he joined a legendary Indonesian band called God Bless with Achmad Albar, Donny Fattah, Yockie Suryoprayogo and Teddy Sujaya. With Ian, God Bless released Huma Di Atas Bukit (1975), Cermin (1980) and Semut Hitam (1989) and thanks to these albums, Ian's popularity jumped through the roof because at that time, rock music had not become an atmosphere in Indonesian music. So while God Bless pioneered rock music in Indonesia, Ian Antono led the way into a new rock guitarist world.

However, soon after the last album of God Bless in 1989, Ian Antono decided to form a band called Gong 2000 and released three albums, Timur (1991), Laskar (1994) and Prahara (1996).

His style of playing in Gong 2000 was different compared to when he was with God Bless. With Gong 2000, Ian tried to include Balinese music into most of his songs. This was followed by including at least 20 Balinese dancers in his performances. Later, Ian decided to work together again with God Bless in 1997 with another Indonesian guitarist, Eet Sjahranie. This concept of duo guitarists grabbed media and listeners' attention although the album "Apa Kabar?" was not a commercial success.

Other than becoming a lead guitarist for God Bless and Gong 2000, Ian has also written songs for numerous other singers. Some of them are notable Indonesian artistes, including but not limited to, Iwan Fals, Anggun, Nicky Astria, Doel Sumbang, Gito Rollies, and Ikang Fawzi. Moreover, many songs that he has arranged for other musicians have become some of the most popular songs of their time, like Zakia and Panggung Sandiwara.

== Equipment ==
=== Guitars ===
During his professional career, Ian has used so many guitars and he often varied the guitar that he uses. Some of the guitar models he has used are Hamer, Kramer Tracer, Fender Stratocaster, Ibanez JEM 77, Washburn N-4, Gibson Les Paul Deluxe, Ovation Elite, Gibson Chet Atkins, Martin CMF, Martin EST 12 strings and Seagull. Back in the story when Ian met Steve Vai at a Formula-1 event, Ian studied most of Steve's equipment which he could not gain in Indonesia. Apparently because of this, Ian has owned an Ibanez JEM77, a Steve Vai Ibanez series.

=== Amplifiers ===
- Mesa Boogie Strategy 400
- Marshall JCM 900 1960
- Trace Elliot AC-100
- Mesa Boogie Quad
- Mesa Boogie Tri Axis

=== Effects ===
- Roland GP8
- Harmonizer Eventide H-3000S

== Awards ==
- BASF Award (1987–1988) for the best arranger and composer Terbaik for an album called Gersang (Nicky Astria).
- HDX Award (1989) for the song Buku Ini Aku Pinjam (Iwan Fals).
- BAFS Award (1989) For the album Bara Timur (Gong 2000) as The Best Selling Album and The Best Arranger & Composer.
- HDX Award (1994) for the album Laskar (Gong 2000) as The Best Album.
- Diamond Achievement Award (1995) for his dedication and success in music industry.

== Tribute ==
His contributions and efforts in Indonesian music has made some Indonesian younger musicians to start a project called A Tribute To Ian Antono, which later an album was released with the same name. Some of the younger bands involved were EdanE, Sheila on 7, Padi, Gigi, Cokelat, Boomerang and /rif. Also there were many solo musicians involved, like Glenn Fredly, Audy and Achmad Albar, his bandmate in God Bless.
