= Chrisye discography =

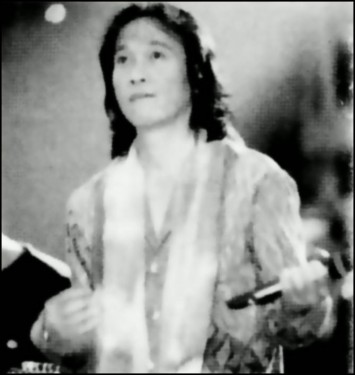
- Chrisye performing live
- Studio albums: 20
- Extended plays: 1
- Soundtrack albums: 3
- Compilation albums: 10
- Tribute albums: 2
- Singles: 56
- Music videos: 26
- Indie albums: 1
- Other video: 2
- Soundtrack albums: 2

During his 40-year career, the Indonesian pop singer Chrisye (1949–2007) released 20 studio albums, 2 tribute or cover albums, 2 soundtrack albums, 10 compilation albums, an indie album, and 56 singles. He also recorded the soundtrack to three feature films, acted in two, and released 26 music videos. In 2008 Rolling Stone Indonesia listed five albums to which Chrisye contributed (Badai Pasti Berlalu [1977] at 1, Guruh Gipsy [1976] at 2, Sabda Alam [1978] at 51, Puspa Indah [1980] at 57, and Resesi [1983] at 82) as among the best Indonesian albums of all time.

After starting his professional music career as a bass guitarist with the band Sabda Nada (later renamed Gipsy) in the late 1960s, Chrisye released his first album, Guruh Gipsy, in 1976; the indie album was a collaboration between Gipsy and Guruh Sukarnoputra. and saw Chrisye's first single as a singer, "Chopin Larung". The following year, he recorded "Lilin-Lilin Kecil" for the Prambors Radio Teenage Songwriting Competition (Lomba Cipta Lagu Remaja); the single, written by James F. Sundah, became his signature song. Also in 1977 he recorded the soundtrack to Teguh Karya's successful film Badai Pasti Berlalu with Berlian Hutauruk; the film's soundtrack album, released several months later, went on to sell over nine million copies, making it one of the most successful Indonesian albums of all time. During this period he also released the highly unsuccessful Jurang Pemisah with Jockie Soerjoprajogo; Chrisye later described its sales as "warm as chicken shit". (Note: Original: "... Jurang Pemisah, yang masih hangat-hangat tahi ayam.")

The successes of Guruh Gipsy, "Lilin-Lilin Kecil", and Badai Pasti Berlalu led Amin Widjaja of Musica Studios to sign Chrisye; he would stay with the company for the rest of his career. With Musica he released his first solo album, Sabda Alam, which sold well. His next album, Percik Pesona (1979), was a critical and commercial failure, leading Chrisye to stop his work with Jockie. He then began work on Puspa Indah (1980), using mostly songs written by Guruh. For promotion, Chrisye had a cameo in the film Puspa Indah Taman Hati (1979), in which he sang "Galih dan Ratna" and "Gita Cinta". Because Chrisye was disappointed with his only major acting role, in Seindah Rembulan (1980), and the failure of his next album, Pantulan Cita (1981), he took a two-year sabbatical. In 1983 Chrisye, having become inspired by the return of Eros Djarot from Germany, began recording a trilogy of albums with Jockie and Djarot. After the trio disbanded in 1984, Chrisye – after releasing another solo album, Sendiri (1984) – produced three albums with young songwriter Adjie Soetomo; the most successful of these, Aku Cinta Dia (1985) sold over a million copies. This collaboration was followed by three albums arranged by Younky Suwarno: Jumpa Pertama (1988), Pergilah Kasih (1989), and Sendiri Lagi (1993). During this period Chrisye released his first music video, for the song "Pergilah Kasih" (1989); the video, directed by Jay Subyakto, was the first Indonesian song to be shown on MTV Southeast Asia. He also released his first and only EP, Cintamu Telah Berlalu (1992), which contains 4 old songs with the new arrangements.

Beginning with AkustiChrisye in 1996, Chrisye's next several albums were arranged by Erwin Gutawa. The music video for the titular song of their next collaboration, Kala Cinta Menggoda (1997), won the MTV Video Music Award for South-East Asia on 10 September 1998. The two then collaborated on rerecording the Badai Pasti Berlalu soundtrack album, releasing their version with orchestral music and new duets. Two years later, the music video for "Setia" from Konser Tur 2001 stirred up controversy for its portrayal of a woman in skintight clothing, considered against Eastern values. Chrisye's final collaboration with Gutawa, Dekade, was a cover album which featured a song written exclusively for the album by Pongky of Jikustik. The singer's last studio album, Senyawa (2004), was a collaboration with other Indonesian artists, which Chrisye arranged.

The first compilation album of Chrisye's works, Chrisye Terbaik, was released in 1987; this was followed by several more during the 1990s. Several more were released after the singer was diagnosed with lung cancer in 2005, including three in the year of his death. In 2008 a single that had been recorded secretly, "Lirih", was released. Its music video featured Ariel of Peterpan, Giring from Nidji, and Chrisye's widow Yanti.

== Albums ==
All music certifications are from Indonesia and are issued by the Recording Industry Association of Indonesia.

=== Studio albums ===
Title	Album details	Certifications	Sales
Jurang Pemisah Dividing Canyon; with Jockie Soerjoprajogo	Released: 17 April 1977; Label: Pramaqua Records; Formats: Compact Cassette (CC), later released as a Compact Disc (CD)	–	–
Sabda Alam Nature's Order	Released: January 1978; Label: Musica Studios; Formats: CC, later released as a CD	–	400,000
Percik Pesona Stain of Enchantment	Released: August 1979; Label: Musica Studios; Formats: CC, later released as a CD	–	–
Puspa Indah Beautiful Flower	Released: June 1980; Label: Musica Studios; Formats: CC, later released as a CD	–	>100,000
Pantulan Cita Reflection of Dreams	Released: 1 January 1981; Label: Musica Studios; Formats: CC, later released as a CD	–	–
Resesi Recession	Released: February 1983; Label: Musica Studios; Formats: CC, later released as a CD	Silver	350,000
Metropolitan	Released: 1984; Label: Musica Studios; Formats: CC, later released as a CD	Silver	>100,000
Nona Miss	Released: 1984; Label: Musica Studios; Formats: CC, later released as a CD	Silver	>100,000
Sendiri Alone	Released: 1984; Label: Musica Studios; Formats: CC, later released as a CD	Silver	>100,000
Aku Cinta Dia I Love Her	Released: 1985; Label: Musica Studios; Formats: CC, later released as a CD	Gold	>1,000,000
Hip Hip Hura Hip Hip Hurray	Released: 1985; Label: Musica Studios; Formats: CC, later released as a CD	Silver	>100,000
Nona Lisa Miss Lisa	Released: 1986; Label: Musica Studios; Formats: CC, later released as a CD	Silver	>100,000
Jumpa Pertama First Meeting	Released: 1988; Label: Musica Studios; Formats: CC, later released as a CD	Silver	>100,000
Pergilah Kasih Go Away, Dear	Released: 1989; Label: Musica Studios; Formats: CC, later released as a CD	Silver	>100,000
Sendiri Lagi Alone Again	Released: 1993; Label: Musica Studios; Formats: CC, CD	Silver	>100,000
AkustiChrisye	Released: 1996; Label: Musica Studios; Formats: CC, CD	Silver	>100,000
Kala Cinta Menggoda When Love Tempts	Released: November 1997; Label: Musica Studios; Formats: CC, CD	Silver	>100,000
Badai Pasti Berlalu The Storm Will Surely Pass	Released: 1999; Label: Musica Studios; Formats: CC, CD	Platinum	350,000
Konser Tur 2001 2001 Concert Tour	Released: 2 June 2001; Label: Musica Studios; Formats: CC, CD	Silver	>100,000
Senyawa One Soul	Released: 22 October 2004; Label: Musica Studios; Formats: CC and CD	Silver	>100,000
" – " denotes no certification or sales information available.

=== Indie albums ===
Title	Album details	Sales
Guruh Gipsy	Released: 1976; Label: Dela Rohita; Formats: CC, later reissued as an LP and CD	Up to 5,000

=== Soundtrack albums ===
Title	Album details	Sales
Badai Pasti Berlalu The Storm Will Surely Pass	Released: 1977; Label: Irama Mas; Formats: CC and LP, later reissued as a CD	9 million domestically by 1993
Seindah Rembulan As Beautiful as the Moon	Released: 1980; Label: Lolypop Records; Formats: CC	–
" – " denotes no certification or sales information available.

=== Tributes ===
Title	Album details	Certifications	Sales
Dekade Decade, a cover album	Released: 8 August 2002; Label: Musica Studios; Formats: CC and CD	Double platinum	350,000
From Us to U A tribute to Titiek Puspa, with several other Musica artists	Released: 2005; Label: Musica Studios; Formats: CC and CD	–	–
" – " denotes no certification or sales information available.

=== Compilation albums ===
Title	Album details
Chrisye Terbaik Best of Chrisye	Released: 1987; Label: Musica Studios; Formats: CC
Slow Cinta Chrisye Slow Love by Chrisye	Released: 1989; Label: Musica Studios; Formats: CC
The Best Of Chrisye	Released: 1993; Label: Musica Studios; Formats: CC, later CD
Best of Chrisye Vol. II	Released: 1999; Label: Musica Studios; Formats: CC
Best Cinta Best Love	Released: 2000; Label: Musica Studios; Formats: CC and CD
Chrisye by Request	Released: 2006; Label: Musica Studios; Formats: CC and CD
Chrisye Duets by Request	Released: 2006; Label: Musica Studios; Formats: CC and CD
Chrisye in Memoriam – Greatest Hits (Note: Released posthumously)	Released: 2007; Label: Musica Studios; Formats: CC and CD
Chrisye in Memoriam – Everlasting Hits	Released: 2007; Label: Musica Studios; Formats: CC and CD
Chrisye Masterpiece Trilogy Limited Edition	Released: 2007; Label: Musica Studios; Formats: CD

== Extended play ==
Title	Album details
Cintamu Telah Berlalu Your Love Has Passed	Released: December 1992; Label: Musica Studios; Formats: CD

== Singles ==
Title	Year	Album
"Chopin Larung" "Floating Chopin"	1976	Guruh Gipsy
"Jeritan Seberang" "Shriek from the Other Side"	1977	Jurang Pemisah
"Jurang Pemisah" "Dividing Canyon"	1977	Jurang Pemisah
"Merepih Alam" "Fragile Nature"	1977	Badai Pasti Berlalu (1977)
"Merpati Putih" "White Dove"	1977	Badai Pasti Berlalu (1977)
"Lilin-Lilin Kecil" "Small Candles"	1977	Lomba Cipta Lagu Remaja 1977
"Sabda Alam" "Nature's Order"	1978	Sabda Alam
"Juwita" "Beautiful"	1978	Sabda Alam
"Angkuh" "Arrogant"	1979	Percik Pesona
"Lestariku" "My Eternity"	1979	Percik Pesona
"Dewi Khayal" "Goddess of Fantasy"	1979	Percik Pesona
"Galih dan Ratna" "Galih and Ratna"	1980	Puspa Indah
"Gita Cinta" "Love Song"	1980	Puspa Indah
"Hening" "Tranquil"	1983	Resesi
"Malam Pertama" "Wedding Night"	1983	Resesi
"Resesi" "Recession"	1983	Resesi
"Lenny"	1983	Resesi
"Selamat Jalan Kekasih" "Farewell Dear"	1983	Metropolitan
"Berita Ironi" "Ironic News"	1984	Nona
"Nona" "Miss"	1984	Nona
"Sarjana Kaki Lima" "Street Vender with a Degree"	1984	Nona
"Sayang" "Dear"	1984	Nona
"Kisah Insani" "Human Story"	1984	Sendiri
"Lestariku" "My Eternity", with Vina Panduwinata	1984	Sendiri
"Sendiri" "Alone"	1984	Sendiri
"Aku Cinta Dia" "Aku Cinta Dia"	1985	Aku Cinta Dia
"Hip Hip Hura" "Hip Hip Hurray"	1985	Hip Hip Hura
"Nona Lisa" "Miss Lisa"	1986	Nona Lisa
"Anak Sekolah" "Schoolgirl"	1986	Nona Lisa
"Kisah Cintaku" "Story of My Love", with Atiek CB	1988	Jumpa Pertama
"Kemesraan" "Intimacy", with Iwan Fals, Rafika Duri, and Bertharia Sonata	1988	Single only
"Pergilah Kasih" "Go Away Dear"	1989	Pergilah Kasih
"Hening" "Tranquil", featuring Rafika Duri and Trio Libel's	1990	Single only
"Kidung" "Ballad", featuring Rafika Duri and Trio Libel's	1990	Single only
"Cintamu T'lah Berlalu" "Your Love Has Passed"	1992	Single only
"Sendiri Lagi" "Alone Again"	1993	Sendiri Lagi
"Damai Bersamamu" "Peace With You"	1996	AkustiChrisye
"Kala Cinta Menggoda" "When Love Tempts"	1997	Kala Cinta Menggoda
"Ketika Tangan dan Kaki Berkata" "When Hands and Feet Speak"	1997	Kala Cinta Menggoda
"Untukku" "For Me"	1997	Kala Cinta Menggoda
"Badai Pasti Berlalu" "The Storm will Surely Pass"	1999	Badai Pasti Berlalu (1999)
"Cintaku" "My Love"	1999	Badai Pasti Berlalu (1999)
"Pelangi" "Rainbow"	1999	Badai Pasti Berlalu (1999)
"Andai Aku Bisa" "If I Could"	2001	Konser Tur 2001
"Setia" "Faithful"	2001	Konser Tur 2001
"Kisah Kasih di Sekolah" "A School Love Story"	2002	Dekade
"Dara Manisku" "My Sweet Maiden"	2002	Dekade
"Kangen" "Longing", with Sophia Latjuba	2002	Dekade
"Seperti Yang Kau Minta" "As You Wish"	2002	Dekade
"Sakura Dalam Pelukan" "Sakura Held Tight"	2002	Dekade
"Pengalaman Pertama" "First Experience"	2002	Dekade
"Jika Surga dan Neraka Tak Pernah Ada" "If Heaven and Hell Never Existed", with Ahmad Dhani	2004	Senyawa
"Menunggumu" "Waiting for You", with Peterpan	2004	Senyawa
"Bur-Kat" "Say It Quickly", with Project Pop	2004	Senyawa
"Cinta Yang Lain" "Another Love", with Ungu	2004	Senyawa
"Asalkan Pilih Jalan Damai" "As Long As You Choose the Road of Peace", with Krisdayanti, Aning Katamsi, Sherina Munaf, Oppie Andaresta, Cindy Claudia, and Acie Harahap	2004	Single Only
"Lirih" "Gentle Voice"	2008	Single Only
"Selamat Jalan Kekasih" "Goodbye Lover", with D'Masiv featuring Maizura	2019	Lover

== Video ==
=== Soundtracks ===
Title	Film details	Reception
Badai Pasti Berlalu The Storm Will Surely Pass	Released: 1977; Studio: Suptan Film; Director: Teguh Karya	212,551 tickets sold (Note: This was the best showing for an Indonesian film that year (Irwansyah 2010, 25 Film Indonesia Terbaik).)
Puspa Indah Taman Hati Beautiful Flower in the Heart's Garden	Released: 1979; Studio: Tiga Sinar Mutiara Film; Director: Arizal	–
Seindah Rembulan As Beautiful as the Moon	Released: 1980; Studio: Melanie Film; Director: Syamsul Fuad	–
" – " denotes no sales information available.

=== Music videos ===
List of music videos, with director (when available) and year
Title	Year	Director
"Pergilah Kasih" "Go Away, Dear"	1989	Jay Subyatko
"Kemesraan" "Intimacy", with Iwan Fals, Rafika Duri, and Bertharia Sonata	1989	–
"Kisah Cintaku" "Story of My Love", featuring Atiek CB	1990	–
"Hening" "Tranquil", featuring Rafika Duri and Trio Libel's	1990	–
"Kidung" "Ballad", featuring Rafika Duri and Trio Libel's	1990	–
"Cintamu T'lah Berlalu" "Your Love has Passed"	1992	Jay Subyakto
"Sendiri Lagi" "Alone Again"	1993	Jay Subyakto
"Kala Sang Surya Tenggelam" "When the Sun Set"	1996	–
"Damai Bersamamu" "Peace with You"	1996	–
"Kala Cinta Menggoda" "When Love Tempts"	1997	Dimas Djayadiningrat
"Ketika Tangan dan Kaki Berkata" "When Hands and Feet Speak"	1997	–
"Untukku" "For Me"	1997	–
"Cintaku" "My Love"	1999	–
"Merpati Putih" "White Dove"	1999	–
"Andai Aku Bisa" "If I Could"	2001	–
"Sabda Alam" "Nature's Order"	2001	–
"Setia" "Faithful"	2001	Rizal Mantovani
"Kangen" "Longing", featuring Sophia Latjuba	2002	–
"Kisah Kasih di Sekolah" "A School Love Story"	2002	–
"Anggrek Bulan" "Moon Orchid", featuring Sophia Latjuba	2002	–
"Seperti Yang Kau Minta" "As You Wish"	2002	–
"Menunggumu" "Waiting for You", with Peterpan	2004	–
"Jika Surga dan Neraka Tak Pernah Ada" "If Heaven and Hell Never Existed", with Ahmad Dhani	2004	–
"Bur-Kat" "Say It Quickly", with Project Pop	2004	–
"Cinta Yang Lain" "Another Love", with Ungu	2004	–
"Marilah Kemari" "Hey Come Here", with various Musica artists	2005	Agung
"Lirih" "Gentle Voice"	2008	Vicky Sianipar
" – " denotes no director information available.

=== Other video ===
Title	Film details	Role
Puspa Indah Taman Hati Beautiful Flower in the Heart's Garden	Released: 1979; Studio: Tiga Sinar Mutiara Film; Director: Arizal	Lounge singer
Seindah Rembulan As Beautiful as the Moon	Released: 1980; Studio: Melanie Film; Director: Syamsul Fuad	Singer
" – " denotes no sales information available.

== See also ==
- List of songs recorded by Chrisye
