= Lirih =

Song by Yana Julio

from the album Jumpa Lagi
- Released: 2002
- Studio: GIN
- Genre: Pop
- Length: 3:46
- Label: Aquarius
- Songwriter: Aryono Huboyo Djati
- Producer: Yana Julio

"Lirih" (English: "Softly") is a song recorded by Indonesian singer Yana Julio for his studio album Jumpa Lagi. Written by Aryono Huboyo Djati, it was released as the ninth track of the album in 2002, by Aquarius Musikindo.

== Background ==
"Lirih" was originally recorded by Chrisye and intended to be part of his fifteenth studio album, Sendiri Lagi (Alone Again; 1993). Aryono Huboyo Djati, the song's composer, said "Lirih" was not included in Sendiri Lagi as "it didn't meet standards, unless it needed minor revisions". (Note: Original: "..."karena tidak memenuhi standar, melainkan harus melalui sedikit revisi".) Aryono revealed due to the deadline, the song was ultimately dropped from the album. However, it was later offered to Yana Julio, who re-recorded the song in 2002.

== Composition ==
"Lirih" was written by Aryono Huboyo Djati, while Andi Rianto and Mira Muchtar participating in the arrangement, and Yana Julio produced the track.

== Personnel ==
Personnel adapted from the liner notes of Jumpa Lagi.

- Aryono Huboyo Djati – songwriting
- Andi Rianto – arrangement, piano, keyboards, drum, and bass
- Mira Muchtar – arrangement
- Yana Julio – vocals, background vocals, producer

== Chrisye version ==
"Lirih"

Single by Chrisye
- Released: 1 August 2008
- Recorded: c. February 2007
- Genre: Pop
- Length: 3:46
- Label: Musica
- Songwriter: Aryono Huboyo Djati

Chrisye singles chronology
"Menunggumu" (2005)	"Lirih" (2008)	"Rindu Ini" (2020)

Later, "Lirih" became the final official recording by Indonesian singer, Chrisye, released posthumously by Musica Studios on 1 August 2008, a year after his death from lung cancer on 30 March 2007. Although the song's existence and its recording date is unknown, many presumed that the song was recorded circa February 2007, a month prior to his death. An Abimael Gandy-directed music video was filmed to promote the single. Chrisye's version of "Lirih" was arranged by Viky Sianipar. It is one of the three Chrisye's songs that released posthumously, the others being "Rindu Ini" ("This Longing"; 2020) and "Yang Kusayang" (2022).

=== Background and composition ===
Chrisye had a forty-year career in Indonesia's music industry, starting as a bassist with Sabda Nada (later known as Gipsy) before his first stint as a vocalist on the indie album Guruh Gipsy (1976). Following the success of his debut single "Lilin-Lilin Kecil" ("Small Candles"; 1977) and album Badai Pasti Berlalu (The Storm Shall Surely Pass; 1977), he began his solo career and signed with Musica Studios. He had released 20 studio albums, an EP and a few compilation albums with Musica prior to his death from lung cancer on 30 March 2007.

To coincide with the first anniversary of Chrisye's death, Musica released his final official recording, entitled "Lirih". Indrawati Wijaya, head of Musica Studios revealed that he and the Musica managements did never know Chrisye recorded the song secretly and he never knew "if the song is kept on Musica, it's really tucked away". (Note: Original: "...kalau lagu ini ada di Musica. Lagu ini benar-benar terselip,".) Chrisye's version of the track is three minutes and forty six seconds long, was composed by Aryono Huboyo Djati. Chrisye choose to kept the song's existence a secret, while its recording date is also been kept secret. Aryono said that it was recorded just "for fun". The lyrics was written after a disagreement with a group and revealed that Chrisye had simplified the song's meaning and turn it into a song about love. Aryono described "Lirih" as his "obituary" to him and a "closing chapter" to Chrisye's songs.

=== Release ===
"Lirih" was released as Chrisye's last single on 1 August 2008 and marketed as his "secret song". The song's music video was directed by Abimael Gandy and featuring Ariel of Peterpan, Giring of Nidji, and Chrisye's widow, Damayanti Noor. Chrisye's longtime collaborator, Guruh Sukarnoputra also made a guest appearance. The video was filmed and released in April 2008. The song is also one of the three songs by Chrisye to be released posthumously after his death, the others being "Rindu Ini" in 2020, followed by "Yang Kusayang" in 2022.

== Works cited ==
- "Chrisye Meninggal Dunia, Dunia Musik Indonesia Berduka" [Chrisye Dies, Indonesia's Music Scene Grieves]. Antara (in Indonesian). 30 March 2007. Archived from the original on 2012-04-04.
- "Lagu Rahasia Chrisye Dirilis" [Chrisye's Secret Song is Released]. Gatra (in Indonesian). 2 August 2008. Archived from the original on 9 July 2019.
- "Lagu Rahasia Yoyo-Chrisye" [Yoyo and Chrisye's Secret Song]. Gatra (in Indonesian). 22 August 2008. Archived from the original on 24 March 2012.
- "Lagu Lama Chrisye Dibuat Video Klip" [Chrisye's Old Song Made Into Video Clip] (in Indonesian). KapanLagi.com. 14 April 2008.
- Erlin (2 August 2008). "'Lirih', Lagu Tertunda Chrisye Dirilis" ['Lirih', Chrisye's Unreleased Song Was Released] (in Indonesian). KapanLagi.com.
- Ruly Riantrisnanto (16 September 2019). "Kisah di Balik Lagu Lirih, Dirilis Setelah Chrisye Meninggal Dunia" [The Story Behind Lirih, Released After Chrisye Dies] (in Indonesian). Liputan 6.
