= Indonesia Maharddhika =

Single by Guruh Sukarnoputra and Gipsy Band

from the album Guruh Gipsy
- Released: 1976
- Recorded: May–June 1976
- Length: 15:39
- Label: Irama Mas
- Songwriter: Guruh Sukarnoputra
- Producer: Guruh Sukarnoputra

Audio sample
- Chrisye singing the lyrics containing Abadi's name within, with traditional instruments playing in the background: file; help

"Indonesia Maharddhika" ([indoneˈsia mahardˈḍika]; Independent Indonesia) is a song by Indonesian progressive rock band Gipsy Band, consisting of Chrisye, Keenan Nasution, Oding Nasution, Roni Harahap, and Abadi Soesman, together with Guruh Sukarnoputra. It was released in 1976 on the album Guruh Gipsy with the names of its contributors hidden in the bilingual lyrics. In 2009, Rolling Stone Indonesia selected it as the 59th best Indonesian song of all time.

== Recording ==
The lyrics and melody to "Indonesia Maharddhika" were written in Guruh Sukarnoputra's house in South Jakarta 1975 by Guruh Sukarnoputra and Roni Harahap. Seeing Guruh struggling to compose a melody, Roni played the introduction to KC and the Sunshine Band's "That's the Way (I Like It)" with the accentuation reversed. Pleased, Guruh wrote some lyrics, drawing inspiration from Rangga Warsita's poems.

When recording, Guruh played the gendér and piano. Chrisye and Keenan Nasution provided vocals, with Chrisye also playing the bass and Keenan playing the drums. Roni played the piano, Oding Nasution was on guitar, and Abadi Soesman on synthesizers. The Hutauruk Sisters provided female backing vocals.

== Lyrics ==
The lyrics to "Indonesia Maharddhika" are a mix of Balinese and Indonesian.

While writing the lyrics to "Indonesia Maharddhika", Guruh Sukarnoputra decided to hide the names of the six contributors to Guruh Gipsy: Oding (Nasution), Chris(ye), Kinan (Keenan Nasution), Roni (Harahap), Abadi (Soesman), and Guruh (Sukarnoputra). Shown below is the name Abadi in the lyrics (which can be heard above). The initials of the name is indicated in bold.

**Original**

**A**ku dengar deru jiwa
**Ba**gai badai mahaghora
**Di** nusantara raya

**Translation**

I hear the roaring of souls
Like the mahagora storm
In the grand archipelago

== Release and reception ==
"Indonesia Maharddhika" was released as the lead track of Guruh Gipsy in 1976. "Indonesia Maharddhika" was well received. In December 2009, "Indonesia Maharddhika" was selected by Rolling Stone Indonesia as the 59th best Indonesian song of all time.

== Bibliography ==
- Ginting, Asrat; et al. (2009). Musisiku [My Musician] (in Indonesian). Jakarta: Republika. ISBN 978-979-1102-52-0. OCLC 227000099.
- Sakrie, Denny (December 2009). "150 Lagu Indonesia Terbaik Sepanjang Masa" [150 Best Indonesian Songs of All Time]. Rolling Stone Indonesia (in Indonesian) (56). Jakarta: 32–103. Archived from the original on 16 March 2012.
