= Keenan Nasution =

- Born: Radakrisnan Nasution; June 5, 1952 (age 73); Jakarta, Indonesia
- Other names: Keenan Nasution
- Occupations: Singer; musician; songwriter
- Years active: 1966–present
- Spouse: Ida Royani (m. 1979)
- Musical career
- Genres: Pop; progressive rock
- Instruments: Vocals; drum

Radakrisnan Nasution (born 5 June 1952), better known as Keenan Nasution, is an Indonesian musician, singer-songwriter, and producer. He is best known for his songs, such as Nuansa Bening. He is also known as a founding member of the Sabda Nada band, which later became the Gipsy band.

== Early life ==
Radakrisnan Nasution was born on 5 June 1952 in Jakarta, and is of Mandailing descent. He is the son of violinist Saidi Hasjim Nasution, whose family lived in West Pegangsaan, Menteng, Jakarta. Radakrisnan Nasution is the third son of five. His siblings are older brothers Zulham Nasution and Gauri Nasution, as well as younger brothers Oding Nasution and Debby Nasution. The five were students of Perguruan Cikini schools, which were known for its musician alumni in the 1960-80s. The brothers themselves became musicians later on, collectively known as the Nasution Brothers (Nasution Bersaudara).

== Career ==
Nasution became a founding member of the Sabda Nada band in 1966. He founded the band with fellow Perguruan Cikini students, including Chrisye, as well as Nasution's own brother, Gauri. The band later changed its name to Gipsy in 1969. Gipsy members moved to New York City in 1972 at the request of one of its members, Pontjo Sutowo, who just won a contract to perform in Ramayana, a Pertamina-owned New York restaurant. The band stayed in New York for three years before returning to Jakarta. In 1977, the band released Guruh Gipsy, a progressive rock album in collaboration with Guruh Sukarnoputra. The album was listed as the second best Indonesian album of all time in a 2007 Rolling Stone Indonesia list.

Outside of Gipsy, Nasution joined God Bless for a short time before eventually forming Badai Band with Chrisye, Guruh, Fariz RM, Yockie Soerjoprajogo, and Roni Harahap in 1975. Nasution, alongside his brother Debbie and most of Badai Band members, helped the production of Badai Pasti Berlalu; the album was listed as the best Indonesian album of all time in the same Rolling Stone Indonesia list. Nasution is also known for his solo works, most notably his first two solo albums Di Batas Angan-Angan (1978) and Tak Semudah Kata-Kata (1979). The former includes the song Nuansa Bening (co-written by Nasution and Rudi Pekerti), which became one of his famous works. The song was re-released twice in 1990; one for the Bunga Asmara album, and another as a collaborative project with Fariz RM, Andi Meriem Matalatta, and Neno Warisman. Nuansa Bening was later re-popularized by Vidi Aldiano in 2008 as a single for his debut album, Pelangi di Malam Hari. In 2024, Nasution stated that he had not received royalty payments from Aldiano's management for his Nuansa Bening rendition. Nasution later denied a 50 million rupiah offer from Aldiano's management and demanded transparency of their royalty payment. Nasution's 1978 album also includes the song Cakrawala Senja (written by Fariz RM and Iman RN), which was sampled by rapper Rich Brian in an unnamed song for his upcoming 2025 album, Where Is My Head?.

== Personal life ==
Nasution married singer Ida Royani in 1979, with whom he had two children, including fashion designer Jenahara Nasution.

== Discography ==
=== Solo ===
1. Di Batas Angan-Angan – 1978 Gelora Seni/Duba Record
2. Tak Semudah Kata-Kata – 1979 DD Record
3. Akhir Kelana – 1980 DD Records
4. Beri Kesempatan – 1981 Musica Studios
5. My Love (with Ida Royani) – 1982 Musica Studios
6. Romansa (with Ida Royani) – 1983 DD Record
7. 42nd Street – 1983 Musica Studios
8. Dara Dara – 1984 DS Records
9. Dulu Lain Sekarang Lain – 1985 DD Record
10. Kupu Kupu Cinta – 1986 Jackson Records
11. Bunga Asmara – 1990 Atlantic Records
12. Akustik – 2012

=== Group/Collaboration ===
1. Guruh Gipsy (with Gipsy) – 1976 Dela Rohita (re-released 2006 by Shadoks Music Germany)
2. Badai Pasti Berlalu – 1977 Irama Mas
3. Palestina (as featuring artist, with Gank Pegangsaan) – 1989 Logiss Record
4. Al Haaj, Biang Kerok – 1992 Bens Records

== Awards ==
Year	Awards	Category	Works	Results
2015	Anugerah Musik Indonesia	Best Progressive Work	"Indonesia Maharddhika" (with Iwan Hasan & Rick Wakeman)	Won
