= Sys NS =

Indonesian politician and radio personality (1956–2018)

- Born: Raden Mas Haryo Heroe Syswanto Soerio Soebagio; 18 July 1956; Semarang, Indonesia
- Died: 23 January 2018 (aged 61); Jakarta, Indonesia
- Citizenship: Indonesian
- Occupation(s): Disc jockey, director, politician
- Years active: c.1965–2018

Haryo Heroe Syswanto Ns. Soerio Soebagio (18 July 1956 – 23 January 2018), better known as Sys NS, was an Indonesian radio personality and politician.

== Biography ==
=== Early life and music career ===
Sys was born in Semarang, Central Java, on 18 July 1956. In the late 1960s he established an underground radio station with his elder brother. In 1970 Sys joined Prambors FM in Jakarta as a DJ and broadcaster. In 1975 Sys was chosen as Indonesia's best DJ.

In 1976 he and fellow Prambors employee Mochamad Noor came up with the idea for a teenage song-writing competition. For one song, "Lilin-Lilin Kecil", written by James F. Sundah, Sys felt as though he needed "someone with the voice of an angel". (Note: Original: "... orang yang punya suara malaikat.") to sing "Lilin-Lilin Kecil", and in his opinion Chrisye fitted the role perfectly. Having heard Chrisye's voice on the indie album Guruh Gipsy (1976), Sys decided that he had exactly the voice required. After Jockie Soerjoprajogo and Imran Amir failed to convince the singer, Sys met him and showed Chrisye the lyrics; this led Chrisye to agree to sing the song. "Lilin-Lilin Kecil", despite coming in ninth place, went on to become the most commercial song of that year.

Sys made his film debut with a minor role in Sjumandjaja's film Kabut Sutra Ungu (Mist of Purple Silk), filmed in 1979. In 1980 he played in the film Seindah Rembulan (As Beautiful as the Moon); he was also instrumental in convincing Chrisye to join the cast. He continued working with Prambors and other radio stations throughout the 1980s, helping promote the comedy troupe Warkop and introducing tribute acts of Western bands. Sys went on the hajj to Mecca in 1989. Upon returning to Indonesia, he reportedly destroyed his collection of pornographic materials, condoms, and sex toys — which he had been collecting to open a museum — in response to his growing devotion towards Islam. By 1990 Sys had become vice president of Duta Media Citra Radio.

=== Politics ===
After the death of Ratno Timoer in 1998, Sys became the head of the Indonesian Film Performers' Association (Persatuan Artis Film Indonesia or PARFI). The following year he became active in politics, being elected as a member of the People's Consultative Assembly. In 2001, he, along with eight others, founded the Democratic Party.

In 2004 Sys' term as a representative finished. That same year, he campaigned extensively, as the campaign manager, to have Susilo Bambang Yudhoyono elected as President of Indonesia. Afterwards, Sys found himself seemingly ignored by the party; in 2005 he campaigned to be chairman of the party, but lost to Yudhoyono's brother-in-law Hadi Utomo. In response, in 2006 Sys left the Democrats and founded the Party of the Unitary State of the Republic of Indonesia (Partai Negara Kesatuan Republik Indonesia).

By 2009, Sys was secretary general of the Regional Unity Party. In 2011, he directed and sponsored a satirical pop opera entitled Cinta Anak Koruptor dan Pacarnya (Love of the Corrupter's Child and Partner) with Rp. 1 billion (US$110,000) of his own money. The opera, held at Ismail Marzuki Park, sold out.

In both presidential campaigns for the 2014 and 2019 terms, Sys, now an independent politician without a party, played a pivotal role for the victories of President Joko Widodo on his campaign team.

=== Personal life and death ===
He was married to Shanty Widhiyanti, with 3 children, Syanindita Trasysty, Sabdayagra Ahessa, and Sadhenna Sayanda.

On 23 January 2018, Sys died at Pondok Indah Hospital in Jakarta.

== Filmography ==
Sys NS appeared in eight films.

- Kabut Sutra Ungu (Mist of Purple Silk; 1980), as Robby
- Seindah Rembulan (As Beautiful as the Moon; 1980)
- Betapa Damai Hati Kami (How Peaceful Our Hearts; 1981)
- Sama-sama Enak (1987)
- Terang Bulan di Tengah Hari (Moon Shining at Noon; 1988), as Sony
- 18++: Forever Love (2012)
- Loe Gue End (You and I are Done; 2012), as Alana's father
- 17 Tahun ke Atas (17 and Up, 2014)
