= Lydia Kandou =

Indonesian actress

- Born: Lydia Ruth Elizabeth Kandou; 21 February 1963 (age 63); Jakarta, Indonesia
- Other name: Lydia Kandou
- Occupations: Actress; Model; Singer
- Years active: 1980 - presents
- Spouse: Jamal Mirdad (m. 1984; div. 2013)
- Children: Hanna Natasya Maria Mirdad; Naysila Nafulany Mirdad; Kenang Kana Mirdad; Nathana Ghaza Mirdad
- Parent(s): Rei Petrus Kandou (father); Maria Jacoba Petronella Giezekamp (mother)
- Relatives: Andrew White (son-in-law)
- Awards: Citra Award for Best Leading Actress: 1991 Boneka dari Indiana; 1992 Ramadhan dan Ramona
- Musical career
- Genres: Pop kreatif, city pop, funk, disco
- Instrument: Vocal
- Years active: 1982–1985 (music)
- Label: Musica Studios

Lydia Ruth Elizabeth Kandou (born February 21, 1963) is an Indonesian actress, model, and singer.

== Biography ==
Kandou was born in Jakarta, Indonesia on 21 February 1963. Her mother is of Dutch descent. Her great-grandmother is of Filipino descent and her great-grandfather is of Indian descent, both from her grandmother and father's side. Her grandfather on her father's side is of Minahasan descent.

Kandou first found work as a model. When 16 years old, she was invited to act by director Imam Tantowi. She made her feature film debut in Has Manan's Wanita Segala Zaman. During the next five years she acted in over 20 films, including several directed by Nyak Abbas Akup. These included a role as the singer Chrisye's love interest in Syamsul Fuad's Seindah Rembulan and several films with the comedy troupe Warkop.

In addition to her acclaimed acting career, Lydia Kandou briefly ventured into the Indonesian pop kreatif music scene during the early 1980s. She released several albums, including Kau yang Selalu Kurindu (1982), Gara-Gara (1984), and Dingin Dingin (1985), showcasing a vocal style influenced by contemporary pop and funk-disco trends. Among her notable tracks are “Denny,” “Aku Semakin Ragu,” “Siapa Yang Salah,” and “Kau Yang Selalu Kurindu,” which remain available on streaming platforms such like Youtube. Although her foray into music was relatively short-lived compared to her film career, these recordings have since developed a modest cult following and contribute to the nostalgic memory of Indonesia's 1980s pop culture.

Kandou was nominated for her first Citra Award for Best Leading Actress at the 1984 Indonesian Film Festival. She continued acting at a slower rate; between 1985 and 1990 she performed in 10 films. From these roles, she received two further Citra Award nominations.

In 1986, Kandou, a Protestant, married Muslim singer-cum-actor Jamal Mirdad in a civil service. At the time their interfaith marriage was considered "sensational" by the news media and led to extensive debate over the legality of such weddings. Ultimately, civil marriages were banned in Indonesia. Owing to their different religions, this wedding was not recognized by the government until 1995, and the case remained common in legal discussions until the 2000s.

In 1990, Kandou was cast in the lead role of Nyak Abbas Akup's film Boneka dari Indiana (Doll from Indiana). After receiving another nomination for the Citra Award she was reportedly nervous; ultimately she received the award, her first win. Her other films that year were all Warkop comedies. She performed in Ramadhan dan Ramona the following year, which led to another win; her husband, who played the leading man, took Best Leading Actor.

As the Indonesian film industry saw a downturn in the early 1990s Kandou migrated to television. Beginning in 1993, she was a regular on Gara-Gara; in 1997 she left the show to join Selendang Sutra Biru. She acted in the hit television series Pernikahan Dini in 2001, playing the titular Dini's mother Shinta.

Kandou made her return to feature films in 2004, when she acted in d'Trex and Ketika. In 2011 she acted in the comedy Kejarlah Jodoh Kau Kutangkap, the title of which referenced her earlier work.

Kandou filed for divorce from Mirdad in April 2013. The two have four children together: Nana Mirdad, Kenang Kana, Nasyila Mirdad, and Nathana Ghaza.

== Filmography ==
As of 2013 Kandou has acted in 55 films.

- Anak-anak Buangan (1979)
- Mencari Cinta (1979)
- Pelajaran Cinta (1979)
- Kisah Cinta Rojali dan Zuleha (1979)
- Remaja Idaman (1979)
- Remaja-remaja (1979)
- Wanita Segala Zaman (1979)
- Hallo Sayang (1980)
- Seindah Rembulan (1980)
- Nikmatnya Cinta (1980)
- Kau Tercipta Untukku (1980)
- Darna Ajaib (1980)
- Lima Cewek Jagoan (1980)
- Sekuntum Duri (1980)
- Hilangnya Sebuah Mahkota (1980)
- Bunga-bunga SMA (1980)
- Tempatmu di Sisiku (1980)
- Kembang Padang Kelabu (1980)
- Jangan Sakiti Hatinya (1980)
- Manis-manis Sombong (1980)
- Nostalgia di SMA (1980)
- Aladin dan Lampu Wasiat (1980)
- Melodi Cinta (1980)
- Masih Adakah Cinta (1980)
- Roman Picisan (1980)
- Dalam Lingkaran Cinta (1981)
- Srigala (1981)
- Perawan-perawan (1981)
- Bunga-bunga Perkawinan (1981)
- Perawan Rimba (1982)
- Johanna (1983)
- Tujuh Wanita Dalam Tugas Rahasia (1983)
- Maju Kena Mundur Kena (1983)
- Pokoknya Beres (1983)
- Tahu Diri Dong (1984)
- Untukmu Kuserahkan Segalanya (1984)
- Kejarlah Daku Kau Kutangkap (1985)
- Kesempatan dalam Kesempitan (1985)
- Gadis Hitam Putih (1985)
- Keluarga Markum (1986)
- Memburu Makelar Mayat (1986)
- Pengantin Baru (1986)
- Tirai Perkawinan (1987)
- Bendi Keramat (1988)
- Siapa Menabur Benci Akan Menuai Bencana (1988)
- Cas Cis Cus (Sonata di Tengah Kota) (1989)
- Jangan Bilang Siapa-siapa (1990)
- Antri Dong (1990)
- Gonta Ganti (1990)
- Kepingin Sih Kepingin (1990)
- Boneka dari Indiana (1990)
- Ramadhan dan Ramona (1992)
- d'Trex (2004)
- Ketika (2004)
- Kejarlah Jodoh Kau Kutangkap (2011)
- Benyamin Biang Kerok (2018)
- The Womb (2022)
- The Talent Agency (television series) (2023)

== Discography ==
=== Album ===
- Kau yang Selalu Kurindu (1982)
- Gara-Gara (1984)
- Dingin-Dingin (1985)
- Hanya Satu Pilihanku (1986, bersama Deddy Dores)
- Lindungi Kesetiaanku (1987, bersama Jamal Mirdad)

== Awards and nominations ==
Year	Award	Category	Recipients	Result
Indonesian Film Festival	1984	Citra Award for Best Leading Actress	Untukmu Kuserahkan Segalanya	Nominated
Indonesian Film Festival	1986	Citra Award for Best Leading Actress	Kejarlah Daku Kau Kutangkap	Nominated
Indonesian Film Festival	1990	Citra Award for Best Leading Actress	Cas Cis Cus (Sonata di Tengah Kota)	Nominated
Indonesian Film Festival	1991	Citra Award for Best Leading Actress	Boneka dari Indiana	Won
Indonesian Film Festival	1992	Citra Award for Best Leading Actress	Ramadhan dan Ramona	Won
Indonesian Film Festival	2016	Citra Award for Best Supporting Actress	Aisyah: Biarkan Kami Bersaudara	Nominated

== Works cited ==
- Bowen, John Richard (2003). Islam, Law, and Equality in Indonesia: An Anthropology of Public Reasoning. Cambridge: Cambridge University Press. ISBN 978-0-511-06237-7.
- Cammack, Mark (2009). "Legal aspect of Muslim-non-Muslim marriage in Indonesia". In Jones, Gavin W.; Heng, Leng Chee; Maznah, Mohamad (eds.). Muslim-non-Muslim Marriage: Political and Cultural Contestations in Southeast Asia. Singapore: Institute of Southeast Asian Studies. ISBN 978-981-230-874-0.
- Endah, Alberthiene (2007). Chrisye: Sebuah Memoar Musikal [Chrisye: A Musical Memoir] (in Indonesian). Jakarta: Gramedia Pustaka Utama. ISBN 978-979-22-2606-5.
- "Filmografi Lydia Kandou". filmindonesia.or.id (in Indonesian). Konfiden Foundation. Archived from the original on 7 March 2016.
- "Guess what?: Lydia Kandau files for divorce". The Jakarta Post. 12 April 2013. p. 28. Archived from the original on 15 April 2013.
- "Lydia Kandau returning to silver screen". The Jakarta Post. 6 September 2011. Archived from the original on 4 March 2016.
- "Lydia Kandou" (in Indonesian). Taman Ismail Marzuki.
- "Lydia Kandou". filmindonesia.or.id (in Indonesian). Konfiden Foundation. Archived from the original on 6 March 2016.
- "Penghargaan Lydia Kandou". filmindonesia.or.id (in Indonesian). Konfiden Foundation. Archived from the original on 4 March 2016.
- Ryanto, Tony (1 July 2001). "'Pernikahan Dini', unique teen romantic series". The Jakarta Post. Archived from the original on 6 August 2011.
