= Seindah Rembulan =

- Handbill
- Directed by: Syamsul Fuad
- Written by: Deddy Armand
- Story by: Rinto Harahap
- Produced by: Karkam Leo; Rinto Harahap
- Starring: Iis Sugianto; Sys NS; Lydia Kandou; Chrisye
- Cinematography: John Santosa
- Edited by: Muryadi
- Music by: Rinto Harahap
- Production company: Melanie Film
- Release date: 1980
- Running time: 120 minutes
- Country: Indonesia
- Language: Indonesian

Seindah Rembulan (As Beautiful as the Moon) is a 1980 Indonesian film directed by Syamsul Fuad. It features Iis Sugianto, Sys NS, Chrisye, and Lydia Kandou in a story about a singer working to support her family. It spawned a soundtrack album.

== Plot ==
A pop music singer (Iis Sugianto) must perform to help her family, including her ailing father. Meanwhile, her boyfriend (Sys NS) and another couple (Chrisye and Lydia Kandou) also sing.

== Production ==
Seindah Rembulan was directed by Syamsul Fuad and featured songs written by Rinto Harahap. Sys NS and Iis Sugianto were cast in the leading roles, while Lydia Kandou was cast as another leading woman.

Pop singer Chrisye, who had previously had a cameo in 1979's Gita Cinta dari SMA (Love Song at High School) but otherwise never had a role in a film, was convinced to participate by his friend Sys NS; Sys NS asked him "when is the next time you will feel what it is like to date a movie star?" Chrisye, used to the recording industry where he could record as he wished, was upset by the frequently laid-back nature of production and waiting for others. He occasionally fought with the director and threatened to walk out several times. After filming was finished, he decided never to make another movie.

== Release and reception ==
Seindah Rembulan was released in 1980 and fairly successful. The theme song continues to be performed, such as at a tribute concert to Rinto Harahap in Jakarta in April 2012, where it was performed by Iis Sugianto in a duet with Marcell.

== Soundtrack album ==
Seindah Rembulan

Soundtrack album by various artists
- Released: 1980
- Genre: Soundtrack

A soundtrack album also entitled Seindah Rembulan was released along with the film. It featured Iis Sugianto and Chrisye, a pair which Denny Sakrie – a reporter with Rolling Stone Indonesia – described as being polar opposites in their musical style. It also featured songs sung by other Indonesian artists. The songs were written by Rinto Harahap and Chrisye, after Jockie Soerjoprajogo left the project because of creative differences.

The album featured two versions of the theme song. The first, a duet by Sugianto and Chrisye, featured musical direction by Chrisye. The second, directed by Rinto Harahap, had Sugianto perform the song solo. Akmal Nasery Basral, writing in Tempo magazine twenty years afterwards, called Chrisye's vocals less "whiny" then Sugianto's. Sakrie wrote that Sugianto and Chrisye were like oil and water, with their vocals not mixing well.

=== Track listing ===
Side A
No.	Title	Writer(s)	Vocals	Length
1.	"Seindah Rembulan" ("As Beautiful as the Moon")	Rinto Harahap	Chrisye and Iis Sugianto
2.	"Jangan Tinggalkan Ku Sendiri" ("Don't Leave Me Alone")	Rinto Harahap	Iis Sugianto
3.	"Selamat Tinggal" ("Farewell")	Rinto Harahap	Grace Simon
4.	"Gaun Kelabu" ("Grey Dress")	Dorie K.	Christine Panjaitan
5.	"Sabda Alam" ("Nature's Order")	Guruh Soekarnoputra	Chrisye

Side B
No.	Title	Writer(s)	Vocals	Length
1.	"Dewi Mayang" ("The Goddess Mayang")	Chrisye	Chrisye
2.	"Sang Surya" ("The Sun")	Iechan	Iis Sugianto
3.	"Jumpa Lagi" ("Meet Again")	Jelly Tobing	Maryance Mantaow
4.	"Biarkan Saja" ("Let It Be")	Rinto Harahap	Iis Sugianto
5.	"Seindah Rembulan" ("As Beautiful as the Moon")	Rinto Harahap	Iis Sugianto

== Notes ==
1. Original: "... kapan lagi ngerasain pacaran sama bintang film?"
