= Rindu Ini =

Single by Chrisye
- Released: 25 September 2020
- Recorded: September 1992
- Genre: Pop
- Length: 5:33
- Label: Musica Studios
- Composer: Tito Sumarsono
- Lyricist: Cecep A.S.
- Producer: Dwiki Dharmawan

Chrisye singles chronology
"Lirih" (2008)	"Rindu Ini" (2020)	"Yang Kusayang" (2022)

"Rindu Ini" ("This Longing") is a song by Indonesian singer, Chrisye, released posthumously by Musica Studios on 25 September 2020. It is one of the three Chrisye's songs that released posthumously, the other being "Lirih" ("Softly"; 2008) and "Yang Kusayang" ("The One That I Love"; 2022).

== Recording ==
The song was recorded in September 1992 and does not include in any of Chrisye's albums. It also never receive airplay from any of Indonesian radio stations during that period. The track was composed by Tito Sumarsono, who previously worked with Chrisye on several of his albums, with lyrics written by Cecep A.S. Dwiki Dharmawan serves as the producer.

Dharmawan revealed that the recording process used technology from the early 1990s, which was considered modern at the time. During the recording, Chrisye asked him to include a synthesizer instead of an acoustic guitar to completed the musical arrangement. Indrawati Widjaja, Director of Musica Studios explained the reason why "Rindu Ini" wasn't released upon the completion of its recording:

"At that time, the process of selecting a 'flagship' song wasn't easy. A flagship song usually consisted of several songs, so careful consideration was needed before including it in the next album." (Note: Original: "Pada masa itu, proses untuk pemilihan lagu 'andalan' tidaklah mudah. Lagu andalan biasanya terdiri dari beberapa lagu, sehingga diperlukan pertimbangan yang matang untuk memasukkan lagu andalan ke dalam rangkaian album selanjutnya,".)

== Themes ==
Yogi Rachman from ANTARA, wrote the song "tells the story of a man who fell in love with his partner". He also complimented that the man "remains sincerely in love with his lover until the end of his life despite a sad past".

== Release and reception ==
"Rindu Ini" was released posthumously on 25 September 2020, 10 days upon what would have been Chrisye's 71st birthday. The song is also the second recording by Chrisye to be released posthumously after his death, the other being "Lirih", his final official recording released in 2008 and followed by "Yang Kusayang" in 2022.

Writing for Kompas, Frans Sartono described the song as the "forgotten artifact" of Chrisye.

== Works cited ==
- Yogi Rachman (28 September 2020). "28 tahun terpendam, lagu "Rindu Ini" Chrisye akhirnya dirilis" [28 years being kept, Chrisye's song "Rindu Ini" was finally released] (in Indonesian). Antara.
- "Lagu 'Rindu Ini' Chrisye Dirilis setelah 28 Tahun Disimpan" [Chrisye's 'Rindu Ini' Was Released after 28 Years Being Kept] (in Indonesian). CNN Indonesia. 25 September 2020.
- Frans Sartono (10 October 2020). ""Rindu Ini", Artefak Tercecer dari Chrisye" ["Rindu Ini", the Forgotten Artifact from Chrisye] (in Indonesian). Kompas.
- Pohan (27 September 2020). ""Rindu Ini" di Bulan Kelahiran Chrisye" ["Rindu Ini" in Chrisye's Birth Month] (in Indonesian). Pophariini.
- Ira Gita Natalia Sembiring; Novianti Setuningsih (28 September 2020). "Tersimpan Selama 28 Tahun, Lagu Chrisye Berjudul Rindu Ini Akhirnya Dirilis" [Chrisye's Song Rindu Ini Finally Released After Being Kept For 28 Years] (in Indonesian). Kompas.
