= Ketika Tangan dan Kaki Berkata =

Single by Chrisye

from the album Kala Cinta Menggoda
- Released: 1997
- Length: 4:20
- Label: Musica
- Composer: Chrisye
- Lyricist: Taufiq Ismail
- Producer: Erwin Gutawa

Chrisye singles chronology
"Kala Cinta Menggoda" (1997)	"Ketika Tangan dan Kaki Berkata" (1997)	"Untukku" (1997)

Audio sample
- file; help

Music video
- "Ketika Tangan dan Kaki Berkata" on YouTube

"Ketika Tangan dan Kaki Berkata" ("When Hands and Feet Speak") is a song recorded and composed by Indonesian singer-songwriter Chrisye for his seventeenth studio album Kala Cinta Menggoda. Penned by Taufik Ismail, it was released as the album's second single by Musica Studios in 1997. A music video was filmed to promote the single.

== Recording ==
"Ketika Tangan dan Kaki Berkata" was the last song Chrisye recorded for Kala Cinta Menggoda. It was based on the Islamic view of the Last Judgment and verse 65 of Surah Ya Sin, which reads:

"Today we shall seal the mouths of the infidels, and their hands will speak to us, and their feet will bear witness to what (evils) they used to earn."

The lyrics were written by Taufiq Ismail after Chrisye asked him to write lyrics to go with a melody he had written. The song's recording required numerous takes as Chrisye would break down in tears after singing a couple of lines. With support from his wife, Yanti Noor, he was able to finish one take of the recording the day before he left for Australia. In his biography, he later wrote that it was one of the most important songs he had ever sung, but he could not sing or listen to it again; he called his emotions in the song the most "sincere" he had ever had while singing.

== Themes ==
According to Chrisye's widow, Yanti Noor, the song's melody "is indeed he got it also there is something else" as he wanted to create "a song about the Majesty of Allah".

== Live performance ==
During 3 Dekade Cinta Chrisye concert held in August 2016, Ussy Pieters and her choir performed "Ketika Tangan dan Kaki Berkata", while Ussy played her harp.

== Release and reception ==
"Ketika Tangan dan Kaki Berkata" and its accompanying music video was released as the second single for Chrisye's nineteenth studio album, Kala Cinta Menggoda and was well received.

The song has been used as a theme song for the 2002 Indonesian drama series, Jalan Lain Ke Sana (Another Way There), starring Sahrul Gunawan.

== Covers ==
""Ketika Tangan dan Kaki Berkata" has been covered by a variety of Indonesian artists like Gigi, Gita Gutawa, Dewi Perssik, Ray Shahreza and Fatin Shidqia.

== Bibliography ==
- Endah, Alberthiene (2007). Chrisye: Sebuah Memoar Musikal. Jakarta: Gramedia. ISBN 978-979-22-2673-7.
