= Hip Hip Hura =

Studio album by Chrisye
- Released: December 1986
- Genre: Pop
- Length: 41:38
- Label: Musica Studios
- Producers: Adjie Soetama; Chrisye

Chrisye chronology
Aku Cinta Dia (1986)	Hip Hip Hura (1986)	Nona Lisa (1987)

Hip Hip Hura (English: Hip Hip Hurray) is an eleventh studio album by the Indonesian singer, Chrisye, released in December 1986 by Musica Studios. Recorded in collaboration with Adjie Soetama, the album, with a similar beat to his previous album Aku Cinta Dia, was later certified silver. However, Chrisye was accused of plagiarism over the title song owing to similarities between it and Kenny Loggins' song "Footloose".

== Recording ==
Hip Hip Hura was Chrisye's second collaboration with Adjie Soetama, after Aku Cinta Dia, which was released earlier that year. Chrisye later stated that Hip Hip Hura was the second part of light beat trilogy, after Aku Cinta Dia but before 1987's Nona Lisa.

Alex Hasyim, who had previously worked on Aku Cinta Dia, was booked as choreographer for Chrisye. Although initially unsure of the possibilities owing to the singer's well known stiff stage persona, Hasyim later noted that Chrisye enjoyed the choreography. He kept the dance moves simple to avoid breaking Chrisye's concentration while singing.

== Reception ==
Despite Chrisye's concerns that the fast tempo did not work for him, Hip Hip Hura was well received. It was certified silver in 1987, with the title song "Hip Hip Hura" receiving a BASF award. In his biography, Chrisye stated that the public was still riding the "euphoria" of Aku Cinta Dia, which had similar musical styles.

The title song, "Hip Hip Hura", faced criticism due to its similarity to Kenny Loggins' 1984 single "Footloose" with the public accusing Chrisye of plagiarism. He later noted that it was meant to be a translation.

== Reissues ==
Hip Hip Hura has been reissued twice, once on CD in 2004 and once as part of the Chrisye Masterpiece Trilogy Limited Edition in 2007.

== Track listing ==
No.	Title	Writer(s)	Length
1.	"Hip Hip Hura" ("Hip Hip Hurray")	Adjie Soetama	4:07
2.	"Maafkanlah" ("Forgive")	Chrisye and Adjie Soetama	3:25
3.	"Sana Sini" ("Here and There")	Chrisye and Adjie Soetama	4:15
4.	"Juli" ("Juli")	Dian Pramana Poetra and Deddy Dhukun	3:45
5.	"Kau dan Aku" ("You and I")	Chrisye	5:24
6.	"Pemuda" ("Adolescent")	Chrisye	4:15
7.	"Tobat" ("Repentance")	Dodo Zakaria	4:27
8.	"Bulan Namanya" ("Its Name is the Moon")	Adjie Soetama	3:27
9.	"Rindu" ("Longing")	Chrisye and Adjie Soetama	3:13
10.	"Hura-Hura II" ("Not Serious II")	Chrisye and Adjie Soetama	3:50
11.	"Terima Kasih" ("Thank You")	Adjie Soetama	3:23
Total length:			41:38
