= Nona Lisa =

Studio album by Chrisye
- Released: July 1987
- Genre: Pop
- Length: 42:07
- Label: Musica Studios
- Producer: Adjie Soetama; Chrisye

Chrisye chronology
Hip Hip Hura (1987)	Nona Lisa (1987)	Jumpa Pertama (1988)

Nona Lisa (English: Miss Lisa) is a twelfth studio album by the Indonesian singer, Chrisye, released in July 1987 by Musica Studios. The album, which have a similar beat and rhythm to Hip Hip Hura, was well received and certified silver. In 2022, American musician Rivers Cuomo of Weezer released a cover of "Anak Sekolah" , as suggested by members of his Discord server.

== Recording ==
Nona Lisa was Chrisye's third collaboration with Adjie Soetama, after Aku Cinta Dia and Hip Hip Hura, both released in 1986. Chrisye later stated that Nona Lisa was the third part of light beat trilogy, after Aku Cinta Dia and Hip Hip Hura. Songwriting was co-handled by Chrisye and Soetama, which they composed three songs, while Oddie Agam composed another two.

== Reception ==
The album was released in 1987 to popular success, with the title track and "Anak Sekolah" released as lead singles. The album was well received, sold over 100,000 copies and being certified silver. Despite Nona Lisa's warm sales, Chrisye decided to end his partnership with Soetama since early 1988 and approached Younky Suwarno for Jumpa Pertama in late 1988.

== Reissues ==
Nona Lisa has been reissued twice, once as a CD in 2004 and once as part of the Chrisye Masterpiece Trilogy Limited Edition in 2007.

== Track listing ==
No.	Title	Writer(s)	Length
1.	"Nona Lisa" ("Miss Lisa")	Tito Soemarsono, Deddy Dhukun, Chrisye	3:54
2.	"Anak Sekolah" ("School Children")	Oddie Agam	4:03
3.	"Saat Yang Indah" ("A Beautiful Moment")	Dadang S. Manaf	4:00
4.	"Kembang Goyang" ("Bouncing Flowers")	Guruh Sukarnoputra	4:59
5.	"Aku Cinta Padamu" ("I Love You")	Chrisye, Adjie Soetama	4:15
6.	"Lenny"	Chrisye, Adjie Soetama	3:47
7.	"Terpendam" ("Pent Up")	Bagoes Aa	5:11
8.	"Huru-Hara" ("Riot")	Chrisye, Adjie Soetama	5:21
9.	"Satu Cinta" ("One Love")	Oddie Agam	3:27
10.	"Maafkan" ("Forgave")	Wacha H.	3:50
Total length:			42:07
