= Gipsy (Indonesian band) =

- Also known as: Sabda Nada (1966–1969)
- Origin: Jakarta, Indonesia
- Genres: Progressive rock
- Years active: 1966–1977 (Note: reunions: 2006, 2009)
- Label: Dela Rohita
- Past members: Pontjo Sutowo; Joe Am Nasution; Gauri Nasution; Edi Odek; Edit; Ronald Boyo; Keenan Nasution; Chrisye; Onan Susilo; Atut Harahap; Tammy Daudsyah; Rully Djohan; Adji Bandy; Lulu Soemaryo; Roni Harahap; Oding Nasution; Abadi Soesman

Gipsy was an Indonesian rock band, formed in 1966. The band was previously known as Sabda Nada until 1969. The group mainly played music from popular American bands of that era, such as The Allman Brothers Band, Chicago, Blood Sweat & Tears, and Keef Hartley. Gipsy's development continued in line with their growing popularity in Jakarta, although they were less well known in other major cities such as Bandung and Surabaya, which were considered benchmarks for Indonesian music.

Together with Guruh Soekarnoputra, Gipsy produced a collaborative album titled Guruh Gipsy in March 1977. The album ranked second on Rolling Stone Indonesia's 150 Greatest Indonesian Albums of All Time, published in 2007.

== Band members ==
- Pontjo Sutowo – organ (1966–1969)
- Joe Am Nasution – guitar (1966–unknown)
- Gauri Nasution – guitar (1966–1974)
- Edi Odek – bass (1966–1968)
- Edit – drum (1966–unknown)
- Ronald Boyo – drum (1966–unknown)
- Keenan Nasution – drum, vocals (1966–1977)
- Chrisye – bass, vocals (1968–1977; died 2007)
- Onan Susilo – organ (1969–1973)
- Atut Harahap – vocals (1969–1972; died 1972)
- Tammy Daudsyah – saxophone (1969–1973)
- Rully Djohan – keyboard (1973–1974)
- Adji Bandy – violin, saxophone (1973–1974; died 1992)
- Lulu Soemaryo – saxophone (1973–1974)
- Roni Harahap – organ (1975–1977; died 2022)
- Oding Nasution – guitar (1975–1977; died 2020)
- Abadi Soesman – keyboard, synthesizer (1975–1977)

== Discography ==
Gipsy only released one album in collaboration with Guruh Soekarnoputra.

- Guruh Gipsy (1977)
