= Chrisye =

Indonesian singer and songwriter (1949–2007)

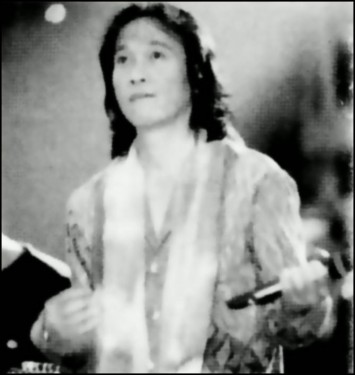
- Born: Christian Rahadi; 16 September 1949; Jakarta, Indonesia
- Died: 30 March 2007 (aged 57); Jakarta, Indonesia
- Resting place: Jeruk Purut Cemetery, South Jakarta
- Other name: H. Chrismansyah Rahadi
- Occupations: Singer; songwriter; guitarist
- Spouse: Damayanti Noor (m. 1982)
- Children: 4
- Musical career
- Genres: Pop; pop rock; progressive rock; progressive pop; pop kreatif
- Instruments: Vocals; guitar; bass
- Years active: 1965–2007
- Label: Musica Studios

Hajji Chrismansyah Rahadi ([krisˈmanʃah raˈhadi]; born Christian Rahadi [kristiˈan raˈhadi]; 16 September 1949 – 30 March 2007), better known by his stage name Chrisye ([krisˈjə]), was an Indonesian progressive pop singer and songwriter.

Born in Jakarta of mixed Chinese-Indonesian descent, Chrisye became interested in music at an early age. At high school, he played bass guitar in a band he formed with his brother, Joris. In the late 1960s, he joined Sabda Nada (later Gipsy), a band led by his neighbours, the Nasutions. In 1973, after a short hiatus, he rejoined the band to play in New York for a year. He briefly returned to Indonesia and then went back to New York with another band, the Pro's. After once again returning to Indonesia, he collaborated with Gipsy and Guruh Sukarnoputra to record the 1976 indie album Guruh Gipsy.

Following the success of Guruh Gipsy; in 1977, Chrisye recorded two of his most critically acclaimed works: "Lilin-Lilin Kecil" by James F. Sundah, which eventually became his signature song, and the soundtrack album Badai Pasti Berlalu. Their success landed him a recording contract with Musica Studios, with whom he released his first solo album, Sabda Alam, in 1978. Over his almost 25-year career with Musica, he recorded a further 18 albums, and in 1980, he acted in a film, Seindah Rembulan. Chrisye died of lung cancer in his Jakarta home on 30 March 2007 after a long illness.

Known for his stiff stage persona and smooth vocals, Chrisye was critically acclaimed in Indonesia. Five albums to which he contributed were included in Rolling Stone Indonesia's list of the 150 Best Indonesian Albums of All Time; another four of his songs (and a fifth to which he contributed) were classified as some of the best Indonesian songs of all time in a later issue of the same magazine. Several of his albums received certification of silver or gold. He received two lifetime achievement awards, one in 1993 from the BASF Awards and another posthumously in 2007 from Indonesian television station SCTV.

== Early life ==
Chrisye was born Christian Rahadi (Lauw Peng Liang) in Jakarta on 16 September 1949 to Laurens Rahadi (Lauw Tek Kang, 1918–2005), a Chinese-Betawi entrepreneur, and Hanna Rahadi (Khoe Hian Eng, 1920–2003), a Chinese-Sundanese housewife from Bogor. He was the second of three sons born to the couple; his brothers were Joris and Vicky. The family lived on Talang Street near Menteng, Central Jakarta, until 1954, when they moved to Pegangsaan Street (also in Menteng).

While attending GIKI Elementary School, Chrisye befriended the neighbouring Nasution family; he became especially close to Bamid Gauri, with whom he played badminton and flew kites. He also began listening to his father's record collection, singing along to songs by Bing Crosby, Frank Sinatra, Nat King Cole, and Dean Martin. After graduating from elementary school, Chrisye attended Christian Middle School III Diponegoro.

Beatlemania reached Indonesia while Chrisye was in Senior High School PSKD Menteng, and increased his interest in music. Responding to Chrisye's desire to play an instrument, his father bought him a guitar; Chrisye chose the bass guitar, as he considered it the easiest to master. As they could not read music, Chrisye and Joris learned to play by accompanying their father's records and songs recorded from the radio. In time they began playing at school events, with vocals by Chrisye. During this period he began smoking in school; when caught, he was punished by being forced to smoke eight cigarettes at once, in front of the assembled pupils. However, this failed to cure his habit and he eventually became a chain smoker.

== Career ==
=== Band member and early projects (1968–1977) ===
Chrisye playing the bass in 1977. He sported long hair for most of his career, until his chemotherapy in 2005.

In the mid-1960s, the Nasution siblings formed a band; Chrisye and Joris watched them play songs by Uriah Heep and Blood, Sweat & Tears. In 1968 Chrisye registered at the Christian University of Indonesia (UKI) to fulfill his father's wish that he become an engineer. Around 1969, however, Gauri invited him to join the Nasutions' band, Sabda Nada, as a replacement for their bassist Eddi Odek who was ill. Pleased with his performance, the Nasutions asked him to stay as a permanent member. The group had a regular gig at Mini Disko on Juanda Street and freelanced at birthday and wedding parties. When Chrisye had a chance to sing while performing covers, he attempted to sound as much like the original artist as he could.

The group was renamed Gipsy in 1969, which they considered more macho and Western-sounding. The schedule for the band, which had no manager, became increasingly busy, since they had begun giving regular performances at Ismail Marzuki Park. As a result, Chrisye decided to drop out of UKI; in 1970 he transferred to Trisakti Tourism Academy, where he considered the study schedule to be more flexible.

In 1972 Pontjo Nasution offered Chrisye the opportunity to play in New York. Although ecstatic, Chrisye was afraid of telling his father, who he thought would disapprove of the idea. He eventually fell ill for several months, during which time the rest of the band left for New York. After Chrisye discussed his fears with Joris and his mother, his father agreed that he could drop out of college to join Gipsy. After his health improved, in mid-1973, he left with Pontjo to meet Gipsy in New York. That same year he dropped out of Trisakti.

While in New York, Gipsy performed at the Ramayana Restaurant, which was owned by the Indonesian gas company Pertamina. The band, housed in an apartment on Fifth Avenue, performed in New York for almost a year, providing Indonesian-themed music and covering songs by Procol Harum, King Crimson, Emerson, Lake & Palmer, Genesis and Blood, Sweat & Tears. Although Chrisye became upset that he could not fully express himself through covers, he continued to work.

Upon returning to Indonesia at the end of 1973 Gauri and his brother Keenan introduced Chrisye to former president Sukarno's son, the songwriter Guruh Sukarnoputra. As the Nasutions worked with Guruh to prepare for their next project, Chrisye began to write his own songs; in doing so he noted that he had difficulty with lyrics that included hard consonants, and worked to avoid them. The following year, he went back to New York with another band, The Pro's. In mid-1975, with several weeks left on his contract, Chrisye's parents called from Jakarta to tell him that his brother Vicky had died of a stomach infection. Unable to return home immediately, Chrisye became distracted by thoughts of his family and began to find playing difficult. As the band returned to Indonesia, Chrisye "cried for the duration of the flight" and sank into a depression. (Note: Original: "... di dalam pesawat [...] saya tak berhenti-henti menangis.")

Chrisye stopped playing altogether until the Nasutions invited him to rejoin Gipsy for their new project with Guruh, who offered Chrisye several songs in which he would be lead singer, with lyrics written especially for him. Overcoming his depression, he joined the group as they practised at Guruh's house in Kebayoran Baru, South Jakarta. The band often rehearsed late into the night; the indie project mixed Western rock and Balinese gamelan and was produced collaboratively. Recording took place in mid-1975, with only four songs completed in the first several months. It was released to critical acclaim in 1976, with a production of 5000 copies. The success of Guruh Gipsy convinced Chrisye that he could sing as a soloist.

Lilin-Lilin Kecil
Chrisye's signature song, "Lilin-Lilin Kecil" (1977 version)

In late 1976 Chrisye was approached by songwriter Jockie Soerjoprajogo and Imran Amir, head of Prambors Radio, who asked him to provide the vocals for the Prambors Radio Teenage Songwriting Competition; Chrisye refused, as he did not want to sing an Indonesian pop song. Several days later Sys NS, an employee of Prambors, approached Chrisye while he was meeting with Guruh and Eros Djarot. Sys emphasised that Prambors needed Chrisye for "Lilin-Lilin Kecil" ("Little Candles"), composed by James F. Sundah. After hearing the lyrics, Chrisye agreed. The song was recorded in Irama Mas Studio in Pluit, North Jakarta, and included on an album with the other contest winners. Originally the ninth track, "Lilin-Lilin Kecil" was placed in the lead position to increase the album's marketability after the original format sold poorly. The song then took off, receiving much airplay; the album was the best-selling of the year.

After the success of "Lilin-Lilin Kecil", in mid-1977 Pramaqua Records approached Chrisye and offered him a contract for an album, Jurang Pemisah (Dividing Canyon). Working with Jockie, Ian Antono, and Teddy Sujaya, Chrisye recorded seven songs for the album; Jockie did two more. Although he was pleased with the results and had high hopes for the album, Pramaqua decided it was not commercially viable and refused to promote it until Chrisye's subsequent album Badai Pasti Berlalu took off. After his unsuccessful attempt to buy up all the stock, the album was released, but because the general public considered it a sequel to Badai Pasti Berlalu, the sales were poor. Although the cassettes reached radio stations throughout the country, Chrisye later described the album as selling "as warmly as chicken shit". (Note: Original: "... Jurang Pemisah, yang masih hangat-hangat tahi ayam.")

That same year, Chrisye and several artists including Djarot and Jockie recorded the soundtrack for the film Badai Pasti Berlalu over two months. After the soundtrack won a Citra Award at the 1978 Indonesian Film Festival, Irama Mas studios approached the group to do a soundtrack album for a flat fee. With Chrisye and Berlian Hutauruk on vocals, the soundtrack was rerecorded in album form in Pluit over 21 days. It was released under the same name as the film, with a picture of actress Christine Hakim on the cover. The album included Chrisye's first songwriting credit, "Merepih Alam" ("Fragile Nature"), but sales were stagnant for the first week until radio stations began to play the singles.

=== Early solo and film career (1978–1982) ===
Chrisye's tenor voice and performance on Badai Pasti Berlalu led Amin Widjaja of Musica Studios to ask him to sign with Musica; Widjaja had been scouting him since the release of Guruh Gipsy. Chrisye agreed on condition that he be allowed creative freedom, to which Widjaja reluctantly agreed. In May 1978 Chrisye began work on his first album with Musica, Sabda Alam (Nature's Order), incorporating several songs by other artists and some written by himself, including the title song. He recorded it after locking himself in the studio with the sound engineer and arranger; despite Amin's wanting to monitor their progress, Chrisye refused to allow him access. The album, greatly influenced by Badai Pasti Berlalu and drawing on the double tracking technique pioneered by the Beatles (in which the vocals are recorded twice to achieve fuller sound), was released in August that year. Heavily promoted in a campaign during which Chrisye was interviewed on the national television station TVRI and on radio, the album eventually sold 400,000 copies.

The following year Chrisye recorded Percik Pesona (Sparks of Enchantment) with Jockie. Produced after Amin's death, the album featured songs written by Chrisye's close friend Junaidi Salat, as well as Jockie and Guruh. The album's title was chosen by vote; the titular song was not released as a single. Percik Pesona, released in August 1979, was a critical and commercial failure. After discussing the issue with other artists, Chrisye blamed the album's failure on its similarity to Badai Pasti Berlalu. As a result, following a period of contemplation, he began branching out into different genres. That same year he was on the panel of the Prambors Teenage Songwriting Competition, held on 5 May.

After deciding that romantic pop songs influenced by easy listening would suit him best, Chrisye began recording his next album, Puspa Indah (Enchanting Blossom). All but one of the songs were composed by Guruh Sukarnoputra; the album also featured the English-language "To My Friends on Legian Beach". Two of the songs, "Galih dan Ratna" ("Galih and Ratna") and "Gita Cinta" ("Melody of Love"), were used in the 1979 film Gita Cinta dari SMA (Melody of Love from High School); Chrisye played a minor part in the film's sequel, Puspa Indah Taman Hati (Enchanting Blossom in Nursery of Heart), as a singer. Due in part to the popularity of the film, Puspa Indah was well received and sold well; "Galih dan Ratna" and "Gita Cinta", released as singles, were also commercially successful.

In 1980 Chrisye appeared in the Indonesian film Seindah Rembulan (As Beautiful as the Moon); at first reluctant to accept the role, he was convinced by Sys NS that it would be fun. He later regretted the decision, considering the film crew unprofessional and often fighting with director Syamsul Fuad. The following year, he released Pantulan Cita (Reflection of Dreams), a collaboration with Jockie. After the album flopped, Chrisye took a long sabbatical.

=== Marriage and changing styles (1982–1993) ===
Although popular with groupies, Chrisye had rarely dated. But in early 1981 he began courting Guruh Sukarnoputra's secretary, Gusti Firoza Damayanti Noor (Yanti Noor Chrismansyah). Yanti Noor, of mixed Dayak and Minang ancestry, was a former singer and came from a musically inclined family; she would often discuss music with Chrisye while he waited for Guruh, and he would also see her when visiting her brother Raidy, one of his friends. When she moved to Bali to work at a five-star hotel there for several weeks, Chrisye followed her and told her that he would marry her when she returned to Jakarta; although this was not a formal proposal, Yanti accepted. In 1982 Chrisye converted to Islam, as Islam does not permit interfaith marriages between Muslim women and non-Muslim men, and changed his name to Chrismansyah Rahadi; Chrisye at the time had been growing increasingly discontent and disillusioned with Christianity. On 12 December 1982 he married Yanti in a Padang-style wedding.

Driven by his poor financial position and invigorated by Djarot's return from Germany, Chrisye began work on his next album with Djarot and Jockie in early 1983. Aciu Widjaja, the new manager of Musica, speculated that they required a new sound; as such, Chrisye, Djarot, and Jockie mixed art rock with Chrisye's standard romantic pop and drew influences from The Police. The resulting album, Resesi (Recession), was released in January 1983. The album was well received, selling 350,000 copies and being certified silver; the singles "Lenny", "Hening" ("Silent"), and "Malam Pertama" ("Wedding Night") received much airplay.

In February 1983, he released another jazzy single titled "Kisah Insani" ("Human Story") in collaboration with Vina Panduwinata. After Resesi, Chrisye collaborated with Djarot and Jockie on the 1983 album Metropolitan. The album, drawing on new wave influences and dealing mainly with issues facing youth, was well received, later going silver; the single "Selamat Jalan Kekasih" ("Goodbye Dear") also became a hit. That year, Chrisye and Yanti had their first daughter, Rizkia Nurannisa. In November 1983, Chrisye released another hit single titled "Seni" ("Art") from the compilation album Cinta Indonesia, in collaboration with Guruh. The following year, Chrisye, Djarot, and Jockie collaborated again on Nona (Miss), which featured social criticism; the album spawned four singles and went on to be certified platinum. Despite Nona's warm sales, after some influence from Aciu, Chrisye decided to look for a new sound and broke off his partnership with Djarot and Jockie in mid-1984.

Chrisye approached Addie MS, a young composer, and asked him to help with the next album. Addie, despite feeling that he was not in the same class as Djarot and Jockie, accepted, and suggested using similar melodies as in "Lilin-Lilin Kecil" and Badai Pasti Berlalu. The resulting album, Sendiri (Alone), with songs by Guruh and Junaidi Salat, included harps, oboes, cor anglais, and a string section. Spawning three singles, the album sold well and earned Chrisye his first BASF Award.

In late 1984 Chrisye approached another young composer, Adjie Soetama, to help him prepare his next album. Light beats and cheerful melodies were in vogue at the time; therefore the two used a lighter style. Recording for the new album, titled Aku Cinta Dia (I Love Her), began in 1985, with additional songs from Guruh and Dadang S. Manaf. The titular song was chosen after Aciu heard a jam session led by Adjie and immediately decided that it would be the lead single. The album called for more emoting, which Chrisye – known as having a stiff stage persona – struggled to deliver, though Yanti prepared colourful costumes and Alex Hasyim trained him in choreography. Upon its release, Aku Cinta Dia sold hundreds of thousands of copies in the first week and was eventually certified gold. That same year, Chrisye and Adji Soetama released Hip Hip Hura (Hip Hip Hurray!), and another collaboration, Nona Lisa (Miss Lisa), was released in 1986; the later two albums had similar beats and rhythms and sold well, although not as well as Aku Cinta Dia. On 2 March 1986 Chrisye and Yanti had their second daughter, Risty Nurraisa.

Despite the success of the trilogy, Chrisye and his family continued to struggle financially; twice they had to sell their family car to raise cash. This led Chrisye to briefly consider quitting the music industry. In 1988 Chrisye recorded Jumpa Pertama (First Meeting), and the following year he released Pergilah Kasih (Go Away Dear). He later recalled that the album, with an arrangement by Younky Suwarno, had a "beautiful touch". (Note: Original: "... sentuhan rasa yang indah.") The title song, "Pergilah Kasih", was written by Tito Sumarsono and used to make Chrisye's first music video; the video, directed by Jay Subyakto, was the first Indonesian song to be shown on MTV Southeast Asia.

On 27 February of the following year, Chrisye and Yanti had twin sons, Randa Pramasha and Rayinda Prashatya. In 1992 Chrisye recorded a cover single of Koes Plus' song "Cintamu T'lah Berlalu" ("Your Love has Passed") with arrangement by Younky; the music video was again broadcast on MTV Southeast Asia and became the first Indonesian music video to be broadcast on the American version of MTV. His first EP of the same name, the only EP he made, was released in December 1992 and well received. The EP contains 4 songs including the title track and the new version of "Lilin-Lilin Kecil". The following year, Chrisye paired up with Younky again to record Sendiri Lagi (Alone Again), a project which required four months of planning and another four months of recording; the music video for the title song was also circulated on MTV South-East Asia.

=== Concerts and collaborations with Erwin Gutawa (1994–2004) ===
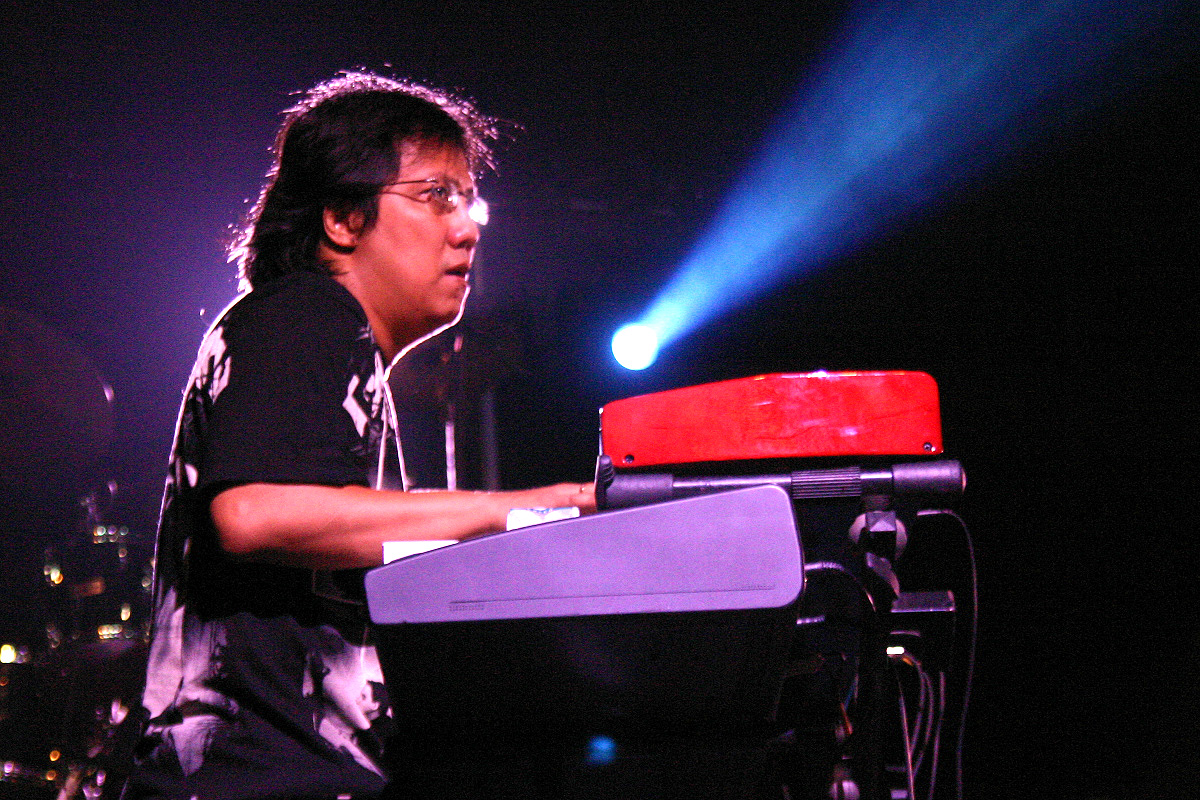
After the success of the Sendiri concert, Chrisye collaborated several times with Erwin Gutawa (pictured in 2004).

Although Sendiri Lagi did fairly well, in the beginning of the 1990s Chrisye began to feel pressure from the increasingly visual-oriented music industry and growing amount of young talent. He again began considering leaving the music industry, feeling as if he had already "reached the finish line". (Note: Original: "Saya merasa sudah sampai garis finish.") Despite reassurances from Yanti that many singers continue to perform into their sixties, Chrisye observed that increasing numbers of established acts were being pushed aside by newcomers. While in this state of despair, Chrisye was approached by Jay Subyakto and Gauri Nasution, who offered him a solo concert at the Plenary Hall of the Jakarta Convention Centre, which had never before hosted a solo concert by an Indonesian artist. Unconvinced he had sufficient fans to fill the hall, Chrisye initially refused.

Gauri tried for several weeks to persuade Chrisye to commit to the concert, and following Chrisye's introduction to Erwin Gutawa, who was scheduled to handle the arrangements, Jay Subyakto succeeded in convincing him that it might be the last chance to revive his career. Lacking the necessary funding, they approached RCTI in search of sponsorship but were refused, and laughingly told that they should try holding a concert at the National Monument. Undeterred, Chrisye, Subaktyo, and Gutawa put together a group of artists and began rehearsals. Around the time of RCTI's fourth anniversary, the television station relented and agreed to fund the concert as part of their celebrations; the thousands of tickets available sold out within a week.

The concert, entitled Sendiri to demonstrate that "100% Indonesian" concerts could be successful, was held on 19 August 1994. Chrisye performed a set that included his greatest hits and several duets, among them "Malam Pertama" with Ruth Sahanaya, in front of a full orchestra conducted by Gutawa. Chrisye recalled later that the audience – children and adults – had memorised the lyrics to his songs, classics and recent releases; he said that this gesture made him feel incredibly small. Invigorated by the concert's success, Chrisye went on tour to Surabaya, Surakarta, and Bandung, using a convoy of 24 trucks and buses to transport the necessary equipment; those concerts also sold out.

Following the success of his Sendiri tour, Chrisye began to explore the possibility of producing an album of his early hits, remastered by Gutawa. On the condition that they use an Australian orchestra to provide backing music, Gutawa agreed to an acoustic-flavoured album. Aciu also agreed, despite the expected cost of Rp 600 million (US$70,000). After basic recording in Jakarta, Chrisye, Gutawa, and sound engineer Dany Lisapali spent two weeks in Studios 301 in Sydney finishing off the album. The Philip Hartl Chamber Orchestra provided the music; the mixing and mastering was also completed in Sydney. AkustiChrisye was released in 1996 and sold well.

After AkustiChrisye, Gutawa suggested that Chrisye try a new style, with more serious songs. The two soon began collaborating on Kala Cinta Menggoda, again using an Australian orchestra. Chrisye, however, found himself unable to record one of the songs, "Ketika Tangan dan Kaki Berkata" ("When Hands and Feet Speak"), written by poet Taufiq Ismail and based on verse 65 of the Qu'ranic sura Ya Sin; he would break into tears after singing only a couple of verses. Eventually, the day before he was to leave for Australia, he completed the song with Yanti's support. On 11 October Chrisye performed "Indonesia Perkasa" ("Powerful Indonesia") at the opening ceremony of the 1997 Southeast Asian Games; the song was written for the event. The following month he released Kala Cinta Menggoda. The music video for the titular song, directed by Dimas Djayadiningrat, won the MTV Video Music Award for South-East Asia on 10 September 1998; Chrisye went to Los Angeles to accept the award at the Universal Amphitheatre.

Chrisye began work on a rearrangement of Badai Pasti Berlalu in 1999 at the request of Musica Studios – although he felt that the original album was fine – and once again teamed up with Gutawa. The new album, which retained the title Badai Pasti Berlalu, cost Rp.800 million (US$95,000) to produce and promote, in part owing to the cost of employing an Australian orchestra, the Victorian Philharmonic Orchestra. After its release, the album sold well, breaking even within three months and selling 350,000 copies. The album led to Chrisye's second sold-out solo concert at the Plenary Hall of Jakarta Convention Centre, known as the Badai concert, and he received numerous offers to perform at venues throughout the country. He later told Kompas that he felt as if he had reached a dead end, having tried all genres available. He continued performing, singing "Indonesia Perkasa" at the opening ceremony of the 15th National Games on 19 June 2000 in Sidoarjo, East Java.

In 2001 Chrisye released the studio album Konser Tur 2001 (Concert Tour 2001), which included two new songs and several old ones. The music video for one of the new songs, "Setia" ("Loyal"), was controversial owing to its portrayal of a woman in tight clothing. Soon afterwards, Chrisye decided to cover some of what he considered the most important Indonesian songs since the country's independence in 1945, ranging from songs from the 1940s like Ismail Marzuki's "Kr. Pasar Gambir & Stambul Anak Jampang" ("Kroncong of Gambir Market and Stambul of the Cowlicked Child"), to the late 1990s such as Ahmad Dhani's "Kangen" ("Longing"). It also featured a song written exclusively for the album by Pongky of Jikustik and two duets with Sophia Latjuba. The album, Dekade (Decade), was released in 2002; by October 2003 it had sold 350,000 copies. On 15 December 2002 Chrisye participated in the Bali for the World – Voices of Stars concert at Kartika Beach Plaza to raise funds for the victims of the bombings on 12 October; other acts involved included Melly Goeslaw, Gigi, Slank, and Superman is Dead. On 12 July 2004 Chrisye held a third concert, Dekade, at Plenary Hall. The concert, with a set that contained numerous classics included in Dekade, featured duets with Sophia Latjuba and several of the original performers, such as Fariz RM with "Sakura" and A. Rafiq with "Pengalaman Pertama" ("First Experience"); Gutawa's orchestra again provided the music.

Chrisye then began work on his last studio album, Senyawa (One Soul). In collaboration with other Indonesian artists including Project Pop, Ungu, and Peterpan, he also produced the album, replacing Gutawa. The song "Bur-Kat" ("Say It Quickly"), with Project Pop, marked his first attempt at rap. Released in October 2004, the album was well received by the market, but Sony Music Entertainment Indonesia complained that the names of their artists were featured on the cover. As a result, the album was withdrawn, and re-released without the offending names.

== Illness and death ==
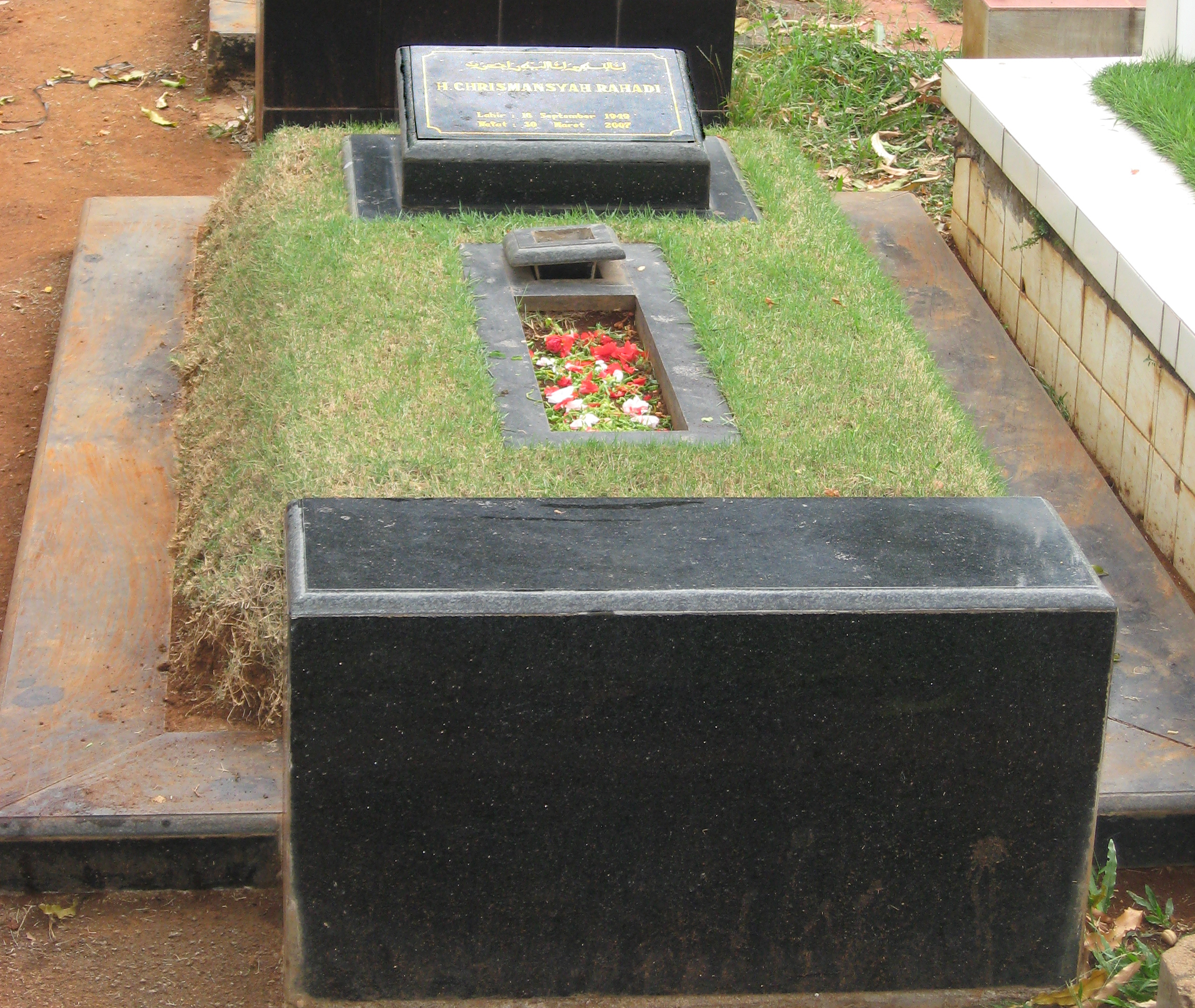
Chrisye's grave in Jeruk Purut Cemetery

In July 2005 Chrisye was admitted to Pondok Indah Hospital, complaining of breathing difficulties. After 13 days of treatment he was moved to the Mount Elizabeth Hospital in Singapore, where he was diagnosed with lung cancer. Although concerned about losing his hair, which he considered part of his image, he underwent the first of six rounds of chemotherapy on 2 August 2005.

Chrisye's health improved in 2006 and in May and November he undertook long interview sessions with his biographer Alberthiene Endah. He also released two compilation albums, Chrisye by Request and Chrisye Duets; however, he reportedly did not feel well enough to release new songs. By February 2007 his health was again in decline.

Chrisye died on 30 March 2007 in his home in Cipete, South Jakarta, at the age of 57. He was buried in Jeruk Purut Public Cemetery, South Jakarta. His funeral was attended by hundreds, including Indonesian celebrities such as his collaborator Erwin Gutawa and singers Titiek Puspa, Ahmad Albar, Sophia Latjuba, and Ikang Fawzi.

One hundred days after Chrisye's death Musica released two compilation albums. Entitled Chrisye in Memoriam – Greatest Hits and Chrisye in Memoriam – Everlasting Hits, they contained fourteen hits from albums ranging from Sabda Alam to Senyawa. On 1 August 2008 Chrisye's last single "Lirih" ("Gentle Voice"), written by Aryono Huboyo Djati, was released. The song's existence had been kept secret, and the recording date is unknown; Aryono has said that it was recorded "for fun". A music video directed by Vicky Sianipar and featuring Ariel of Peterpan, Giring of Nidji, and Chrisye's widow was released later.

== Style ==
According to Jockie, one of the main reasons that Chrisye was chosen to record "Lilin-Lilin Kecil" was that he had a unique voice with a soft timbre, which went well with the keyboards used; Jockie, however, felt that Chrisye's voice lost its dynamics when mixed with mellow music, which led him to give their collaboration Jurang Pemisah more of a rock feel. Gutawa compared Chrisye's voice to a blank sheet of paper, able to be applied to anything. Sys NS wrote in 2007 that he had been looking for "someone with the voice of an angel" to sing "Lilin-Lilin Kecil", and in his opinion Chrisye fitted the role perfectly. (Note: Original: "... orang yang punya suara malaikat.")

A writer for the Indonesian magazine Gatra described Chrisye's on-stage persona as "stiff", with very little movement. Alex Hasyim, who did the choreography for Aku Cinta Dia and Hip Hip Hura, recalled that Chrisye was in a cold sweat on their first day of practise and eventually created his own dancing style as he could not follow Hasyim's instructions.

Chrisye chose his own costumes and at times experimented with different colours and designs. In all his music videos he preferred to wear the same style of shirt, quipping in an interview with Kompas that he would only wear a different one if he had fallen into a ditch.

== Legacy ==
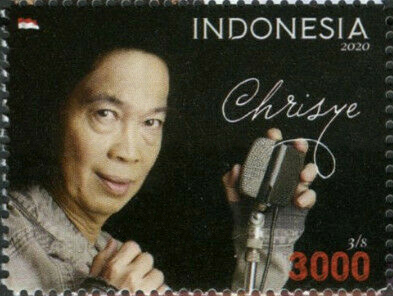
Chrisye on a 2020 stamp of Indonesia

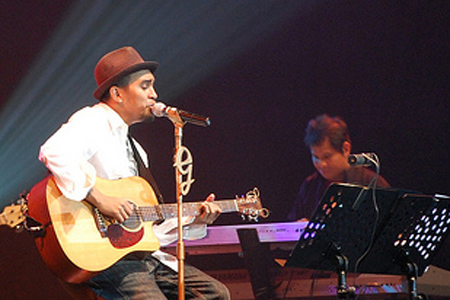
Glenn Fredly (left) performing a tribute to Chrisye at the 2009 Java Jazz Festival in Jakarta

Chrisye has been described as "legendary" by several journalists. In their 2007 list of the 150 Best Indonesian Albums of All Time, Rolling Stone Indonesia ranked Badai Pasti Berlalu first. Three of Chrisye's solo albums were also on the list: Sabda Alam at 51, Puspa Indah at 57, and Resesi at 82. Guruh Gipsy was selected as the second-best album of all time. This was followed by the selection of four of his songs ("Lilin-Lilin Kecil" at number 13, "Merpati Putih" at number 43, "Anak Jalanan" at number 72, and "Merepih Alam" at number 90) as some of the best Indonesian songs of all time; Guruh Gipsy's song "Indonesia Maharddhika" placed at number 59. In 2011 they listed Chrisye as the third-greatest Indonesian musician of all time. Eros Djarot described him as having a great voice, but somewhat shy and generally unwilling to discuss social issues.

According to data from the Indonesian Recording Industry Association, the original Badai Pasti Berlalu is the second-best-selling Indonesian album of all time, with nine million copies sold between 1977 and 1993. In 1990 the music video for "Pergilah Kasih" was the first Indonesian music video to be shown on MTV Hong Kong; the video clip for "Sendiri Lagi" was voted the best Indonesian music video of all time in the fifth episode of Video Musik Indonesia.

In 2009 many Indonesian artists, including Vina Panduwinata, Ahmad Albar, D'Cinnamons, and Sherina Munaf, performed 20 of Chrisye's songs as a tribute in the "Chrisye: A Night to Remember" concert at the Ritz Carlton, Jakarta. The sold-out concert also featured testimonials by his wife and children. Another concert, described as Chrisye's fourth, rather than as a tribute concert, was held on 5 April 2012. Entitled Kidung Abadi Chrisye (Chrisye's Eternal Ballad) and held at Plenary Hall in the Jakarta Convention Centre, it featured a holographic representation of the singer performing with Sophia Latjuba, Once Mekel, Vina Panduwinata, and Gutawa's daughter Gita. The concert included a new song, "Kidung Abadi" ("Eternal Ballad"), written by Erwin and Gita Gutawa and made using 246 previously recorded syllables.

Alberthiene Endah has written two biographies of Chrisye. The first, Chrisye: Sebuah Memoar Musikal (Chrisye: a Musical Memoir), was published in 2007 and details his childhood, career, and struggle with cancer. The second, The Last Words of Chrisye, was released in 2010 and covers the final years of his life. Another book, Chrisye, di Mata Media, Sahabat & Fans (Chrisye, in the Eyes of the Media, Friends, & Fans) was released in March 2012.

In 2017, a biopic film depicting on his life journey was released on 7 December, directed by Rizal Mantovani and starring Vino G. Bastian as Chrisye. Filming began in February 2017. On 16 September 2019, Google celebrated his 70th birthday with a Google Doodle. On 25 September 2020, Musica Studios released his previously unreleased single, "Rindu Ini", which was recorded in September 1992. Another his unreleased single, "Yang Kusayang" was released on 30 March 2022 to coincide with the 15th anniversary of his death. In 2022, Rivers Cuomo of Weezer went viral during the release of a Chrisye cover song "Anak Sekolah" before the band performing at Soundrenaline in Indonesia.

== Honours and awards ==
Chrisye received numerous awards during his career. In 1979 he was selected as the Favourite Singer of the Indonesian Armed Forces. His albums Sabda Alam and Aku Cinta Dia were certified gold, and the albums Hip Hip Hura, Resesi, Metropolitan, and Sendiri were certified silver.

Chrisye received three BASF Awards, sponsored by the BASF cassette production company, for best-selling albums; his first was in 1984 for Sendiri, followed by one in 1988 for Jumpa Pertama and one in 1989 for Pergilah Kasih. He received the BASF Lifetime Achievement Award in 1994 for his contributions to Indonesian music; the same year he received the BASF Award for Best Recording Artist. In 1997 he received an Anugerah Musik Indonesia for Best Male Pop Singer. The following year Kala Cinta Menggoda won nine AMIs, including Best Album; Chrisye himself received awards for Best Male Pop Singer, Best Recording Singer, and Best Graphic Designer (shared with Gauri). In 2007 he posthumously received the first SCTV Lifetime Achievement Award, which was accepted by his daughter Risty.

== Personal life ==
Aciu Widjaja, now President-Director of Air Asia, described Chrisye as a simple man and said that one time, when he, Chrisye, and several others had gone overseas Chrisye was the only one who did not look for brand-name clothing or world-class restaurants; instead he ate at a food court and bought what he felt was comfortable. In his biography, Chrisye noted that he enjoyed eating at roadside foodstalls well after his marriage and would be perplexed when people stared at him. Guruh recalled that Chrisye would sleep anywhere during extended planning sessions, including under the piano.

After his marriage to Damayanti Noor (b. 4 September 1954), she ended her singing career to become a housewife. When the couple had children, Chrisye often had little time to spend with them as he was busy performing or recording; however, he attempted to spend as much time with them as possible. In a 1992 interview, he said that his children did not want to follow in their parents' footsteps and become singers because they had seen the stresses it put on the family. His wife died on 8 February 2020.

== Discography ==
Chrisye released 31 albums during his lifetime, 1 with Guruh Gipsy, 21 studio albums, and 9 compilation albums. His solo albums after Sabda Alam all sold more than 100,000 copies. In a 1992 interview with Kompas, Chrisye said that he fell ill after recording each of his albums, blaming the pressure to promote them.

Chrisye also released many singles, several of which were used as theme songs for Indonesian soap operas: "Pengalaman Pertama" was used for the serial Ganteng-Ganteng Kok Monyet (Very Handsome, But Like a Monkey!), "Cintaku" ("My Love") from the remastered Badai Pasti Berlalu was used for Gadis Penakluk (The Maiden Conqueror), and "Seperti Yang Kau Minta" was used for Disaksikan Bulan (Witnessed by the Moon).

=== With Guruh Gipsy ===
- 1976 – Guruh Gipsy

=== Studio albums ===
- 1977 – Jurang Pemisah (Dividing Canyon)
- 1978 – Sabda Alam (Nature's Order)
- 1979 – Percik Pesona (Stain of Enchantment)
- 1980 – Puspa Indah (Beautiful Flower)
- 1981 – Pantulan Cita (Reflection of Dreams)
- 1983 – Resesi (Recession)
- 1984 – Metropolitan
- 1984 – Nona (Miss)
- 1984 – Sendiri (Alone)
- 1985 – Aku Cinta Dia (I Love Her)
- 1985 – Hip Hip Hura (Hip Hip Hurray)
- 1986 – Nona Lisa (Miss Lisa)
- 1988 – Jumpa Pertama (First Meeting)
- 1989 – Pergilah Kasih (Go Away Dear)
- 1993 – Sendiri Lagi (Alone Again)
- 1996 – AkustiChrisye
- 1997 – Kala Cinta Menggoda (When Love Tempts)
- 1999 – Badai Pasti Berlalu (The Storm Will Surely Pass; re-recorded in collaboration with Erwin Gutawa)
- 2001 – Konser Tur 2001 (2001 Concert Tour)
- 2002 – Dekade (Decade)
- 2004 – Senyawa (One Soul)

=== Soundtrack albums ===
- 1977 – Badai Pasti Berlalu (The Storm Will Surely Pass)
- 1980 – Seindah Rembulan (As Beautiful as the Moon)

=== Singles ===
This section lists only singles that were not part of a studio album.

- 1977 – "Lilin-Lilin Kecil" ("Small Candles")
- 1995 – "Asalkan Pilih Jalan Damai" ("As Long as You Take the Peaceful Path"; with Krisdayanti and Harvey Malaiholo)
- 2008 – "Lirih" ("Softly")
- 2020 – "Rindu Ini" ("Longing"), the previously unreleased song Chrisye recorded in 1992.
- 2022 – "Yang Kusayang" ("The One That I Love")
