= Gatra (magazine) =

Former Indonesian weekly news magazine

- February 2012 cover
- Editor-in-Chief: Mukhlison Sri Widodo
- Categories: News and politics
- Frequency: Weekly (on Thursdays)
- Circulation: 3,000 (2024)
- Publisher: Era Media Informasi
- Founder: Bob Hasan
- First issue: 19 November 1994; 30 years ago
- Final issue: 25 July 2024
- Country: Indonesia
- Based in: Jakarta
- Language: Indonesian
- Website: gatra.com
- ISSN: 0853-1706

Gatra (stylized in all caps) was a weekly news magazine published in Jakarta, Indonesia from 1994 to 2024. It was one of the two principal news magazines in the country, the other being Tempo.

Gatra was founded in 1994, following Suharto administration's ban on Tempo magazine; it was primarily founded by former Tempo staff. The magazine has its headquarters in Jakarta. It provides articles on news and was published on a weekly basis.

The magazine's motto was Baca Gatra Baru Bicara (Read Gatra, Then Talk). The magazine folded in July 2024 after 30 years of publication due to economic effects of the COVID-19 pandemic.

== List of editors-in-chief ==
- Herry Komar (1994–1998)
- Widi Yarmanto (1998)
- Bernardus Rahmanto (1998–2002)
- Iwan Qodar Himawan (2002–2006)
- Budiono Kartohadiprodjo (2006–2012)
- Heddy Lugito (2012–2016)
- Carry Nadeak (2016–2019)
- Mukhlison S. Widodo (2019–2024)
