= Guruh Gipsy =

Studio album by Guruh Sukarnoputra and Gipsy Band
- Released: 20 March 1977
- Recorded: July 1975 – February 1976, May – June 1976, July – November 1976
- Studios: Tri Angkasa Music Laboratory, Jakarta
- Genres: Progressive rock, Indonesian music
- Length: 59:34
- Label: Dela Rohita
- Producer: Guruh Soekarnoputra

Guruh Gipsy is a 1977 Indonesian studio album released by Guruh Sukarnoputra in collaboration with the band Gipsy, consisting of Keenan Nasution, Chrisye, Roni Harahap, and Oding Nasution. Mixing modern instruments with traditional Javanese and Balinese music styles, it is now considered a landmark album. In 2007, Rolling Stone Indonesia named it the second best Indonesian album of all time.

== Production ==
Guruh Gipsy was produced independently; Guruh Sukarnoputra contacted Gipsy and asked them to help. Guruh wrote the songs and also played the piano and gendér. Both Chrisye and Keenan provided vocals, with Chrisye also playing the bass and Keenan on drums. Roni Harahap played the piano, Oding Nasution was on guitar, and Abadi Soesman on synthesizers. The Hutauruk Sisters provided female backing vocals.

The cover art was designed to convey a meaning. On the cover, there is the term "Dasabayu", consisting of 10 figures of Balinese script which convey meaning; I-A meaning "event", A-Ka-Sa meaning "emptiness", Ma-Ra meaning "new", La-Wa meaning "truth", and Ya-Ung meaning "eternal". Underneath is written Kesepakatan dalam Kepekatan (Agreement in Darkness).

== Musical style ==
Guruh Gipsy combines modern, Western instruments like the piano, synthesizers, and various rock instruments with traditional music forms, including Balinese gendér, Central Javanese vocal styles, and West Javanese melodies and scales. It has been described as progressive rock and heavy pop.

== Release and reception ==
Guruh Gipsy was released on the indie label Dela Rohita. It was well received.

Guruh Gipsy has been described as a "landmark album" and "a pillar of the Indonesian pop music industry". In December 2007, Rolling Stone Indonesia selected Guruh Gipsy as the second-best Indonesian album of all time, behind Badai Pasti Berlalu. In 2009, they selected one of the songs from the album, "Indonesia Maharddhika", as the 59th best Indonesian song of all time. The song "Chopin Larung" was also well received.

Guruh Gipsy is considered an influence for the 1990s Indonesian trend of mixing traditional instruments with pop music.

In 2006, the album was reissued by Shadoks Music on LP. According to Nasution, the release was done without the band's permission, and was pulled out of print after Nasution sent an email to Shadoks management.

On 1 June 2026, the album was released on double LP and CD as a 50th-anniversary remastered edition.

== Track listing ==
All tracks are written by Guruh Sukarnoputra.

No.	Title	Length
1.	"Indonesia Maharddhika" ("Independent Indonesia")	15:44
2.	"Chopin Larung" ("Floating Chopin")	6:37
3.	"Barong Gundah" ("The Depressed Barong")	7:20
4.	"Janger 1897 Saka"	8:27
5.	"Geger Gelgel" ("Commotion in Gelgel")	12:16
6.	"Smaradhana" ("Passion")	2:20
7.	"Sekar Ginotan" ("The Ginotan Composition")	6:38

== Bibliography ==
- Endah, Alberthiene (2007). Chrisye: Sebuah Memoar Musikal [Chrisye: A Musical Memoir] (in Indonesian). Jakarta: Gramedia. ISBN 978-979-22-2673-7.
- Ginting, Asrat; et al. (2009). Musisiku [My Musician] (in Indonesian). Jakarta: Republika. ISBN 978-979-1102-52-0. OCLC 227000099.
- "150 Album Indonesia Terbaik Sepanjang Masa" [150 Best Indonesian Albums of All Time]. Rolling Stone Indonesia (in Indonesian). Jakarta. December 2007.
- Sakrie, Denny (December 2009). "150 Lagu Indonesia Terbaik Sepanjang Masa" [150 Best Indonesian Songs of All Time]. Rolling Stone Indonesia (in Indonesian) (56). Jakarta: 32–103. Archived from the original on 16 March 2012.
- Titon, Jeff Todd; Cooley, Timothy J.; Locke, David; et al., eds. (2009). Worlds of Music: An Introduction to the Music of the World's Peoples (3rd ed.). Clark Baxter. ISBN 978-0-495-57010-3.
