= Guruh Sukarnoputra =

Indonesian musician, choreographer and politician (1953–2026)

Guruh Sukarno Putra
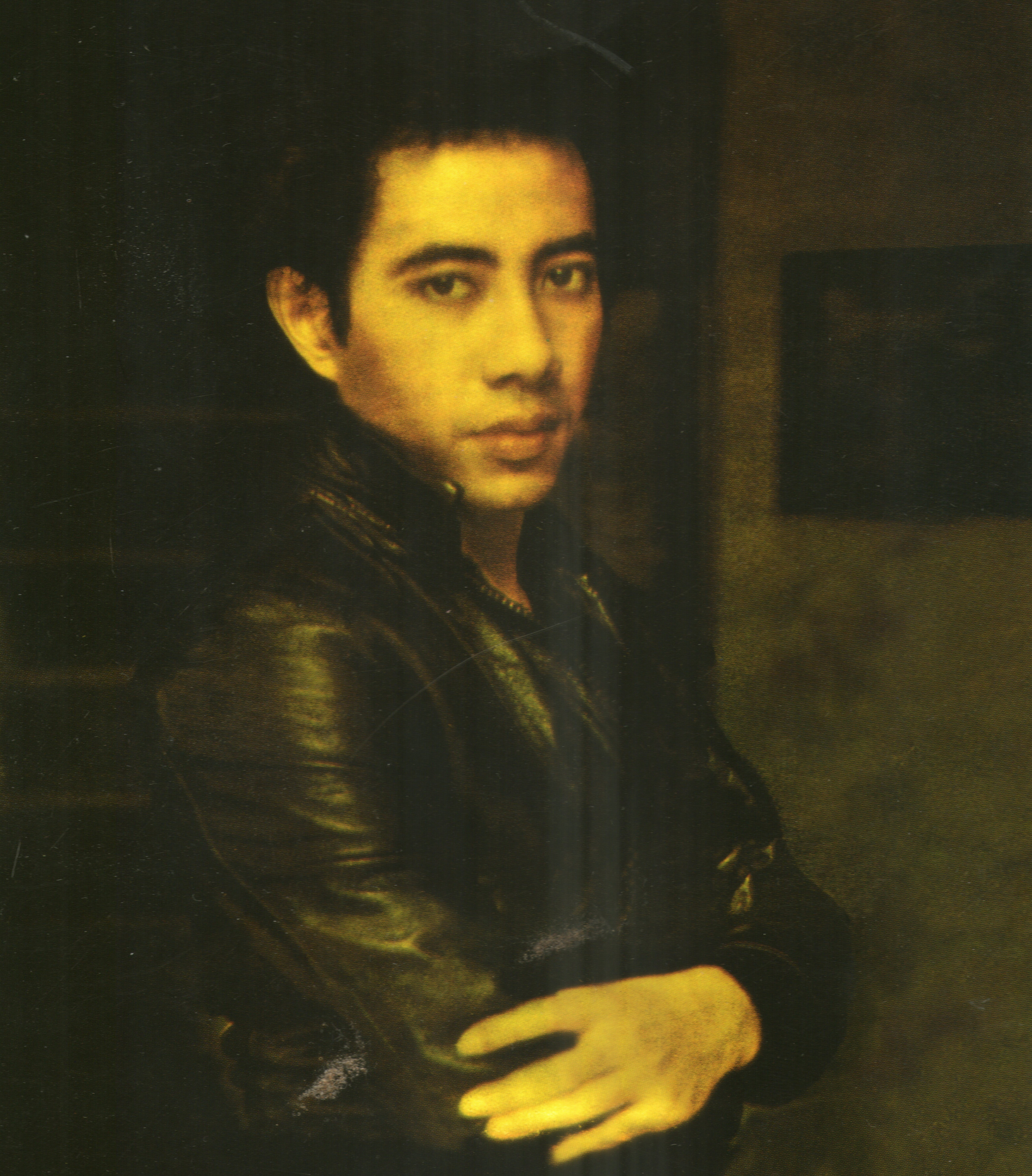
- Born: Muhammad Guruh Irianto Sukarno Putra; 13 January 1953; Jakarta, Indonesia
- Died: 26 September 2026 (aged 73); Jakarta, Indonesia
- Resting place: Karet Bivak Cemetery
- Occupations: Politician; musician; producer; choreographer
- Political party: Indonesian Democratic Party (1989-1999) Indonesian Democratic Party of Struggle (1999–2026)
- Spouse: Guseynova Sabina Padmavati (m. 2002; div. 2014)
- Parents: Soekarno (father); Fatmawati (mother)
- Relatives: Megawati Sukarnoputri (sister)
- Musical career
- Genres: Progressive rock; world; progressive pop; pop kreatif

Muhammad Guruh Irianto Sukarno Putra (13 January 1953 – 26 September 2026) was an Indonesian politician and artist, who was a member of Indonesia's People's Representative Council. He was the youngest son of Indonesia's first president, Sukarno with his third wife, Fatmawati, and the brother of former Indonesian president, Megawati Sukarnoputri. He served as a member of the People's Representative Council for 30 years and was one of the longest-serving members of the Parliament of Indonesia.

== Education and career ==
Guruh attended elementary and high school in Jakarta. He then studied at the Archaeology Faculty at the University of Amsterdam, graduating in 1976. Rather than immediately following in his father's footsteps into politics, he chose a career in the arts, and produced over 100 choreographic works and written popular Indonesian songs. In 1991, he was awarded the Chevalier de L'Ordre des Arts et des Lettres (Knight of the Order of Arts and Letter) by the French government.

He recorded an album called Guruh Gipsy in 1977 with Chrisye.

Guruh entered politics in 1992, becoming a member of the Indonesian legislature, the People's Representative Council, representing the Indonesian Democratic Party (PDI). When the PDI split following a 1996 party congress in Medan, he joined the breakaway Indonesian Democratic Party of Struggle. He was reelected under the banner of the new party in the 1999 Indonesian legislative election and was again re-elected in 2004, 2009, 2014 and 2019. He represented the regency of Blitar, East Java until his death in 2026.

He produced artistic performances, such as the opening ceremony of the 2000 Indonesian National Games in Surabaya.

== Personal life ==
Mohammad Guruh Irianto Sukarnoputra was born in Jakarta on 13 January 1953. In 2002, at age 49, Guruh married for the first time, amid media speculation he was seeking higher political office, possibly even the presidency. His wife was an Uzbek-born Azeri dancer, Guseynova Sabina Padmavati, 26 years his junior. They were married on 20 September 2002 in Tashkent, Uzbekistan, and a wedding ceremony was later held over 19–20 October 2002 in Sriwidjaya Raya, Jakarta. The marriage ended in divorce and Sabina reportedly returned to Uzbekistan.

=== Death ===
In September 2026, after struggling with illness for several days, Guruh was put into intensive care at the MRCCC Siloam Hospitals Semanggi, Jakarta, and was in critical condition. He was pronounced dead on 26 September at 04:16 WIB, at the age of 73. Guruh was buried later in the afternoon at Karet Bivak Cemetery, Central Jakarta, alongside his agnate half-sibling, Taufan Soekarnoputra's grave, and in the same area where his mother, Fatmawati, is buried.

== Selected filmography ==
=== Television ===
Year	Title	Role	Notes	Ref.
2023	Cigarette Girl	Theme music composer		
