= Sidoti =

Sidoti is a surname. Notable people with the surname include:

- Annarita Sidoti (1969–2015), Italian race walker
- Chris Sidoti, Australian human rights lawyer
- John Sidoti (born 1970), Australian politician
- Francesco Sidoti, Italian sociologist and criminologist
