= Yanghee Lee =

South Korean expert for international human rights

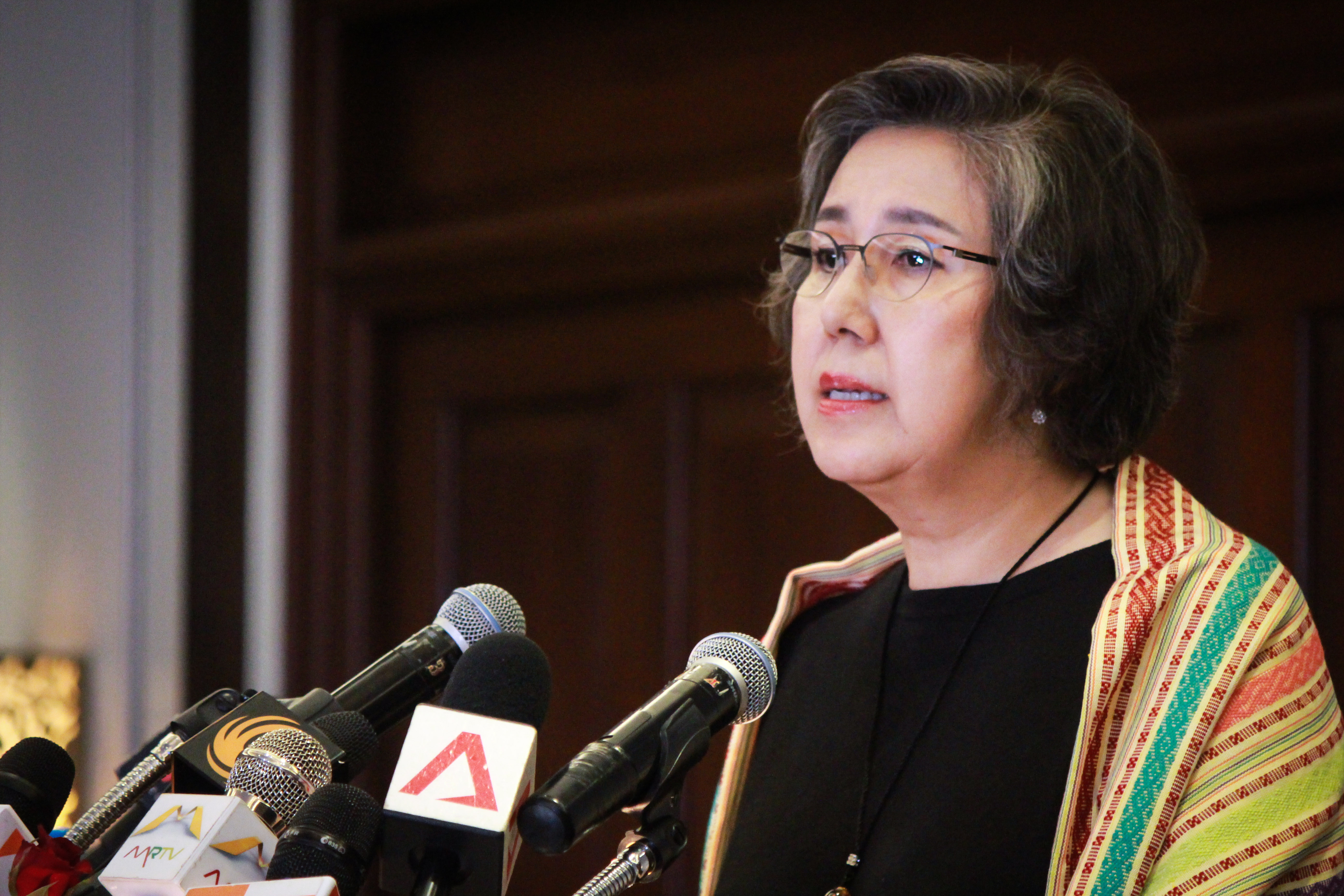
- Lee in 2017

United Nations Special Rapporteur on Human Rights in Myanmar
- In office 2014–2020
- Preceded by: Tomás Ojea Quintana
- Succeeded by: Tom Andrews

Personal details
- Born: 24 July 1956 (age 70) Seoul, South Korea
- Education: Georgetown University; University of Missouri
- Occupation: United Nations Special Rapporteur, former chairperson of Committee on the Rights of the Child, developmental psychologist and professor at Sungkyunkwan University
- Awards: Human Rights Award of Korea

Korean name
- Hangul: 이양희
- Hanja: 李亮喜
- RR: I Yanghui
- MR: I Yanghŭi

Yanghee Lee (Korean: 이양희; Hanja: 李亮喜, born 24 July 1956) is a South Korean developmental psychologist and professor at Sungkyunkwan University. She is most noted for her work in international human rights organisations. Lee is highly recognized nationally, regionally, and internationally for her expertise in human rights. She has published numerous articles and books on human rights and children’s rights.

== Education ==
Lee earned her undergraduate (B.S.) degree from Georgetown University. She later undertook postgraduate studies at the University of Missouri and earned an M.ED. and Ph.D.

== Human rights works and United Nations career ==
Lee currently serves on the Advisory committee of the National Human Rights Commission of Korea. She is the founding President of the International Child Rights Center, a non-profit organization based in Seoul. In 2009, she received the Order of Civil Merit, the highest recognition given to a civilian in Korea, for her work in human rights.

Lee served as chairperson of the Committee on the Rights of the Child under the UN High Commissioner for Human Rights from 2007 to 2011. She also served as chairperson of the Meeting of Chairpersons of Human Rights Treaty Bodies from 2010 to 2011. The Open Society Foundations funded her work through several grants to the Sungkyunkwan University destined to support her research.

=== Myanmar ===
In 2014, Lee was appointed special rapporteur of the UN on the situation of human rights in Myanmar first established in 1992 under the Commission on Human Rights Resolution 58 and extended annually. Following usual practice, her appointment as special rapporteur on the situation of human rights in Myanmar was extended for one year in March 2019. The Myanmar government denied access to Lee. She completed her term in April 2020, and was succeeded by Thomas Andrews.

In the aftermath of the 2021 Myanmar coup d'état, she co-founded the Special Advisory Council for Myanmar (SAC-M) in March 2021 alongside two UN officials, Marzuki Darusman and Chris Sidoti.

== Titles, awards and honours ==
- (South Korea) 2009: Human Rights Award of Korea as Winner, National Human Rights Commission of Korea
