= Candra Darusman =

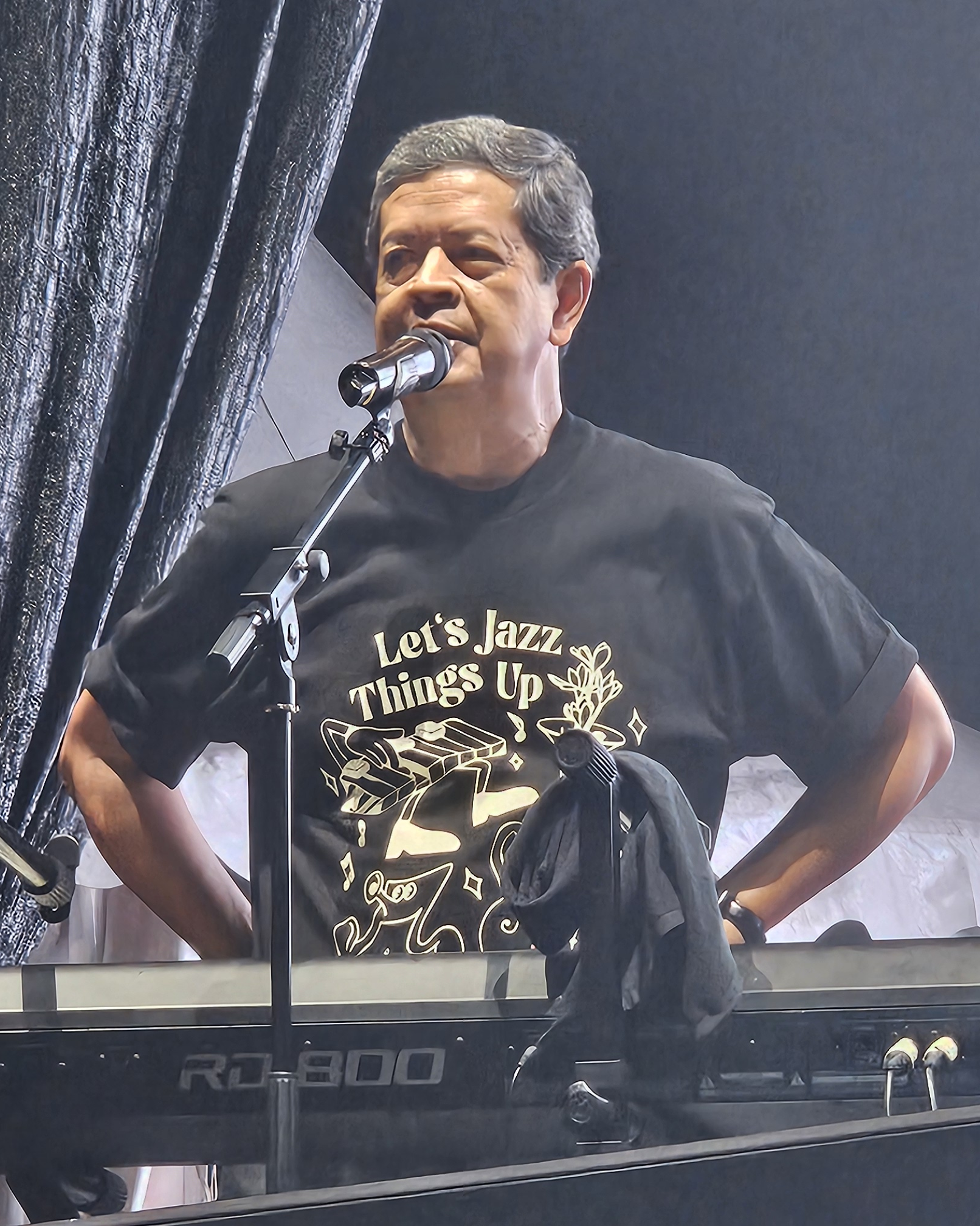
- Born: Candra Nazarudin Darusman; August 21, 1957 (age 69); Bogor, West Java, Indonesia
- Other name: Candra Darusman
- Education: University of Indonesia
- Occupations: Singer; musician; songwriter
- Years active: 1978–present
- Relatives: Marzuki Darusman (brother)
- Musical career
- Genres: Jazz; jazz fusion; smooth jazz
- Instruments: Keyboard; piano; guitar; bass guitar
- Labels: Musica Studios (1979–1983); Irama Tara (1981); Prosound Records (1985–1988); Aquarius Musikindo (1990–1997); Billboard Indonesia
- Formerly of: Chaseiro; Karimata

Candra Nazarudin Darusman (born 21 August 1957) is an Indonesian singer-songwriter and music producer. He was previously a member of two jazz music groups, Chaseiro and Karimata. He is also known as a solo artist, best recognized for his song "Kau" and "Kekagumanku".

In addition, he is the founder of the annual event Jazz Goes To Campus, held at the University of Indonesia. After residing in Geneva, Switzerland, and working with the World Intellectual Property Organization (WIPO) as Indonesia's representative, he now serves as a deputy director at WIPO, based in Singapore.

== Early life ==
Darusman was born on 21 August 1957 in Bogor, Indonesia and is the son of Indonesian diplomat Suryono Darusman. Darusman has four siblings, among them are lawyer Marzuki Darusman, who served as Attorney General of Indonesia (1999–2001) and journalist Taufik Darusman.

== Career ==
Darusman began his career in 1978 when he founded Chaseiro. The group created five albums, all under Musica Studios: Pemuda (1979), Bila (1980), Tiga (1981), Ceria (1983), and Persembahan (2001). He also founded Karimata alongside Erwin Gutawa, Deny TR, Aminoto Kosin, and Uce Haryono. Furthermore, he created solo albums such as Indahnya Sepi (1981) and Kekagumanku (1983). In addition, Darusman produced songs for other singers such as Fariz RM, Vina Panduwinata, Utha Likumahuwa, and Ruth Sahanaya. In 2022, he produced the theme song for the 2022 G20 Bali summit, titled "Recover Together, Recover Stronger".

Darusman has a history of heading musical organizations, most notably heading PARPRI (Persatuan Artis Pencipta Lagu, Penata Musik Rekaman Indonesia, or Association of Songwriters and Recording Music Arrangers of Indonesia) in 1987–2001. He is also considered as among the first musicians to campaign for copyright handling of musical works in Indonesia, along with Enteng Tanamal and TB Sadikin Zuchra. As a copyright campaigner, he headed the Karya Cipta Indonesia (Indonesian Creative Works) foundation from 1991 to 2001. Later, he acted as a consultant for World Intellectual Property Organization in 2016.

== Filmography ==
=== Film ===
Year	Title	Credited as	Notes
Year	Title	Composer	Notes
1980	Untukmu Indonesiaku!	Yes	
1980	Roman Picisan	Music arrangement	
1986	Telaga Air Mata	Yes	
1986	Cinta yang Terjual	Yes	

== Discography ==
=== Solo albums ===
- Indahnya Sepi (1981)
- Kekagumanku (1983)

=== Compilation albums ===
- It's Amazing – Perjalanan Karya Candra Darusman (2017)

A collaborative album featuring re-recorded golden works by Candra Darusman, both from his solo career and with the groups Chaseiro and Karimata, arranged by Erwin Gutawa and Addie M.S., and featuring renowned artists such as Andien, Glenn Fredly, Fariz Rustam Munaf, Sheila Majid, Maliq & D'Essentials, and the emerging duo ShiLi & Adi.

- Detik Waktu: Perjalanan Karya Cipta Candra Darusman (2018)

== Awards and nominations ==
Award	Year	Category	Nominated work	Result	Ref.
Anugerah Musik Indonesia	2001	Best Jazz/Fusion Songwriter	"Persembahan" – performed by Chaseiro	Nominated	
Anugerah Musik Indonesia	2018	Best of the Best Album	Detik Waktu: Perjalanan Karya Cipta Candra Darusman	Won	
Anugerah Musik Indonesia	2018	Best Pop Album	Detik Waktu: Perjalanan Karya Cipta Candra Darusman	Won	
Anugerah Musik Indonesia	2019	Best Rap/Hip-hop Production	"Woosah" – with Matter Mos & Dipha Barus	Nominated	
Anugerah Musik Indonesia	2019	Best Instrumental Production	"Bersamamu"	Nominated	
Anugerah Musik Indonesia	2021	Best Contemporary Jazz Artist	"Perjumpaan Kita" – with Dian Sastrowardoyo	Won	
