= Network for North Korean Democracy and Human Rights =

South Korean non-profit

- Formation: December 10, 1999; 26 years ago
- Type: NGO
- Headquarters: Seoul, South Korea
- Key people: Yu Sae Hee (chairman), Han Ki Hong (president), Kim Young Hwan (head researcher)
- Website: en.nknet.org

The Network for North Korean Democracy and Human Rights (북한민주화네트워크, NKnet) is a registered NGO based in Seoul, South Korea. The organization conducts research on and raises public awareness about North Korea, human rights in North Korea, and Korean unification. It also engages in movement building activities and has helped launch other organizations, most notably the Daily NK. Their stated goal is to "help bring about democracy and respect for human rights in North Korea."

== History ==
NKnet was founded in Seoul in 1998. Its founders are veterans of South Korea’s democracy movement and most at one time formerly supported North Korea’s Juche ideology. By the mid-1990s, however, those who would go on to found the group, including prominent activist Kim Young Hwaan, publicly renounced their support for the North Korean regime in response to increasing evidence of human rights violations in the country.

== Activities ==
Past activities have included training programs, seminars, photo exhibitions, a speaker series, and an international conference on human rights in North Korea co-sponsored with the National Endowment for Democracy in 2010. In 2004, NKnet also launched and later spun off the Daily NK, an online newspaper that has a network of sources within North Korea. The organization also started Radio Free Chosun, which broadcasts to North Korea over shortwave radio. In 2011, NKnet hosted the world’s first annual North Korean Human Rights International Film Festival. In September 2012, it hosted its second annual film festival. NKnet is a member of The International Coalition to Stop Crimes Against Humanity in North Korea (ICNK). The organization has also participated in various forums and campaigns including the “Daughter of Tongyeong Rescue Campaign" on behalf of Shin Suk-ja.

== Publications ==
NKnet published the magazine Locks quarterly from 2001 to 2005. NKnet currently publishes NK Vision each month, a Korean magazine of North Korean news for scholars, reporters and others. Each month NK Vision carries round-table discussions, expert analysis, book reviews, and interviews with scholars, government officials, North Korean refugees, and activists. Past issues have examined in depth the succession of Kim Jung Un, marketization, the Korean Wave (Hallyu)’s reach into North Korea, missile tests and nuclear programs, and the US and ROK elections. In 2011, NKnet published a Defector Survey on International Food Aid Distribution, based on interviews with 500 people who had left North Korea. Among other findings, 79% of respondents said they never received international food aid, while 27% of international food aid recipients reported they had to return some or all of the aid to authorities after international monitors left. In 2012, Intermedia published A Quiet Opening: North Koreans in a Changing Media Environment, a report which featured data gathered by NKnet.

== Awards ==
On December 11, 2009, NKnet received the Human Rights Award of Korea from the National Human Rights Commission of Korea for its role in raising awareness of human rights violations in North Korea. On December 10, 2012, the South Korean government awarded NKnet head researcher Kim Young Hwan the Order of Civil Merit "for his contribution to the promotion and protection of human rights in commemoration of the Universal Declaration of Human Rights." Earlier that year Kim and three other activists had been arrested in China and held for 114 days. Kim said he was arrested for assisting North Korean refugees in China and that the authorities tortured him during his detention. The Chinese government denied torturing him.

== Funding ==
The organization's funding has come from the National Endowment for Democracy and through partnering on a project-to-project basis with other organizations and the South Korean Ministry of Unification and Ministry of Public Administration and Security.

== Media Coverage ==
NKnet’s work has been quoted or mentioned by Korean and international news media including the Chosun Ilbo, Wall Street Journal, National Public Radio, New York Times, Time, Telegraph, il Post, Le Monde, and Dagens Nyheter.
