= Special Advisory Council for Myanmar =

Independent advisory group of international experts

- Abbreviation: SAC-M
- Founders: Yanghee Lee; Chris Sidoti; Marzuki Darusman
- Region served: Myanmar
- Website: specialadvisorycouncil.org

The Special Advisory Council for Myanmar (abbreviated SAC-M) is an independent advisory group of international experts, to provide an international platform for the democratic movement in Myanmar. SAC-M was co-founded by three UN officials, Yanghee Lee, Marzuki Darusman and Chris Sidoti, in March 2021, in response to the 2021 Myanmar coup d'état. The group regularly publishes briefing reports and analyses relating to the domestic situation in post-coup Myanmar. SAC-M advocates a coordinated global 'three cuts' strategy against the military junta, namely to 'cut the weapons, cut the cash, and cut the impunity.'

== Reports ==
In January 2023, SAC-M published a report, Fatal Business: Supplying the Myanmar Military’s Weapon Production, that detailed how the Burmese military had significantly increased arms production as fighting in the Myanmar civil war escalated. The report implicated foreign companies based in Austria, France, China, Singapore, India, Israel, Ukraine, Germany, Taiwan, Japan, Russia, South Korea and the U.S.
