= Marzuki Darusman =

Indonesian lawyer

His Excellency Marzuki Darusman
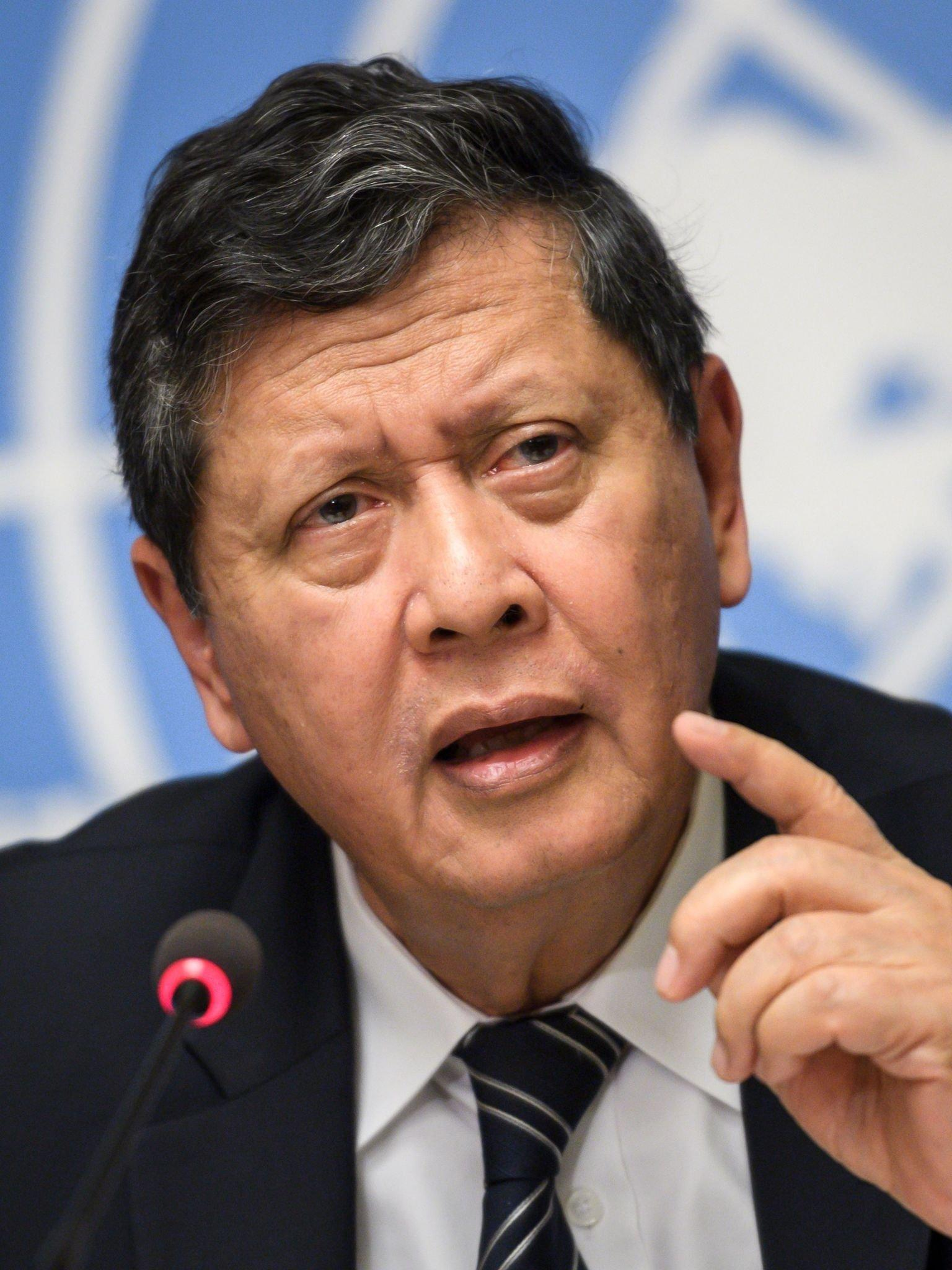
- Darusman speaking at a United Nations conference in Geneva in 2018.

Attorney General of Indonesia
- In office November 1999 – June 2001

Special Rapporteur on the situation of human rights in the DPRK
- In office January 2010 – September 2016

Personal details
- Born: 26 January 1945 (age 81) Bogor, West Java, Indonesia
- Party: Golkar
- Relations: Candra Darusman (brother)
- Education: Parahyangan Catholic University
- Occupation: Lawyer

Marzuki Darusman (born 26 January 1945) is an Indonesian lawyer and human rights campaigner who served as the Attorney General of Indonesia from 1999 to 2001. He currently serves as the chairman of an UN Human Rights Council mission on Myanmar since July 2017. He is the Director-General of the Human Rights Resource Centre for ASEAN.

Darusman has served on several national and international human rights commissions, he has served as chair of an independent Fact-Finding Mission on Myanmar under the UN Human Rights Council since July 2017. He served as Special Rapporteur on the situation of human rights in the DPRK (2010–2016) and member of the Commission of Inquiry on Human Rights in North Korea (2013 to 2014). In 2010, he was assigned to serve as chair of the UN Secretary-General's Panel of Experts on Sri Lanka and in 2009 he was appointed by UN Secretary-General Ban Ki-moon to a three-member UN Commission of Inquiry to investigate the assassination of former Pakistani Prime Minister Benazir Bhutto.

== Background ==
Darusman was born in Bogor, West Java, in 1945. The son of Suryono Darusman, a diplomat, he spent much of his childhood in Europe; this later influenced his thoughts on social norms and equality, as Darusman found the class differences present in Indonesia disturbing. His brother, Candra, went on to be a composer.

In 1974 he graduated from law school at Parahyangan Catholic University in Bandung. With Golkar, Darusman spent fifteen years as a member of the People's Representative Council, representing Bandung.

In 1994, Darusman was one of the first members of the National Commission on Human Rights. In 1998, after the fall of President Suharto in May, Darusman was a member of the Joint Fact Finding Team, which looked into the widespread rioting and pogroms before the president's resignation. Meanwhile, Darusman seized power within Golkar – torn between pro- and contra-Suharto factions – and reorganised the party. He subsequently convinced the party to support Muslim cleric Abdurrahman Wahid, of Nahdlatul Ulama, for president.

== National offices ==
In November 1999 Darusman was chosen Attorney General of Indonesia, replacing acting Prosecutor General Ismudjoko; he had previously been considered for Foreign Minister, a post which ultimately went to Alwi Shihab. In the position, he worked to combat corruption; among those convicted for corruption while Darusman served were former Minister of Trade and Industry Bob Hasan and Bank of Indonesia governor Syahril Sabirin; he also limited Suharto's movements and brought corruption charges against the former president and several charities he ran. In criminal law, Darusman was instrumental in removing former Chief of the Armed Forces Wiranto from his cabinet position, later bringing Wiranto to trial for alleged human rights violations in East Timor and several military members to trial for issues in Aceh. During this time, he was the third most heavily guarded political figure in the country, behind President Wahid and Vice-President Megawati Sukarnoputri.

Darusman's term ended in June 2001, when he was replaced with former Minister of Law and Human Rights Baharuddin Lopa. The following month he was appointed Cabinet Secretary. From 2004 to 2009 Darusman served as a member of the People's Representative Council, representing Golkar.

== Work with the United Nations ==
In 2008, Darusman was called by Lynn Pascoe, an Under-Secretary-General of the United Nations, to participate in the United Nations inquiry into the assassination of former Pakistani prime minister Benazir Bhutto. He accepted, and the committee spent nine months investigating the incident through 2009. In June 2010, he was appointed to a three-person panel to write the Report of the Secretary-General's Panel of Experts on Accountability in Sri Lanka, which dealt with alleged war crimes during the Sri Lankan Civil War. The report, which found evidence of numerous war crimes and condemned both the Sri Lankan government and its Lessons Learnt and Reconciliation Commission, was ill-received in Sri Lanka, leading Darusman to be burned in effigy and refused entry to the island nation.

In August 2010, Darusman became founding director of the Human Rights Resource Centre for ASEAN, a think tank at the University of Indonesia which involves several ASEAN countries. That same month he was appointed United Nations Special Rapporteur on Human Rights in North Korea. In 2011, Darusman described the country as "perhaps the only country today that does not recognize that non-cooperation with the human rights mechanism is not an option"; he believes that North Korea must give greater respect to human rights, while other nations must be willing to send humanitarian aid. A similar report, delivered in March 2012, led to North Korean delegate So Se-pyong walking out of a meeting, after which a "scuffle" broke out. The North Korean delegation decried the report as a "useless interpretation".

== FIHRRST ==
Marzuki Darusman is the Chairman and Founder of The Foundation for International Human Rights Reporting Standards (FIHRRST), an international association dedicated to the respect, protection and fulfilment of human rights. Darusman is joined by a group of internationally-respected human rights advocates (among others, Marzuki Usman, H.S. Dillon, Makarim Wibisono, James Kallman, Dradjad Hari Wibowo) to establish the organization, which develops and promotes standards by which adherence to human rights principles can be demonstrated.

== Other activities ==
Marzuki Darusman is a member of the Global Leadership Foundation, an organization which works to support democratic leadership, prevent and resolve conflict through mediation and promote good governance in the form of democratic institutions, open markets, human rights and the rule of law. It does so by making available, discreetly and in confidence, the experience of former leaders to today’s national leaders. It is a not-for-profit organization composed of former heads of government, senior governmental and international organization officials who work closely with Heads of Government on governance-related issues of concern to them.

In the aftermath of the 2021 Myanmar coup d'état, he co-founded the Special Advisory Council for Myanmar (SAC-M) in March 2021 alongside two UN officials, Yanghee Lee and Chris Sidoti.

== Honors ==
- Order of the Rising Sun, 2nd Class, Gold and Silver Star (May 2017), appointed at the same time as Michael Kirby for their work on human rights abuses in North Korea.
