= Choi Young-ae =

South Korean human rights activist (b. 1951)

- 최영애

Chairperson of National Human Rights Commission of Korea
- In office 4 September 2018 – 3 September 2021
- Preceded by: Lee Sung-ho
- Succeeded by: Song Doo-hwan

Secretary-General of National Human Rights Commission of Korea
- In office 19 February 2002 – 22 July 2004
- Succeeded by: Kwak No-hyun

Standing Commissioner of National Human Rights Commission of Korea
- In office 23 July 2004 – 20 September 2007

Personal details
- Born: 10 January 1951 (age 75) Busan, South Korea
- Education: Ewha Womans University

Choi Young-ae (Korean: 최영애; Hanja: 崔永愛; born 10 January 1951) is a South Korean human rights activist currently serving as the 8th chairperson of the National Human Rights Commission of South Korea from 2018 to 2021. She is the first woman to lead the commission as well as its first chairperson with no background of practicing law.

She previously worked at the commission as its first secretary-general and standing-commissioner. She was also the acting-chairperson of the commission in 2006. She played an instrumental role in establishing legal foundation for creation of the commission in late 1990s.

For over three decades, Choi worked for advancement of human rights - on issues of women's rights and survivors and victims of sexual violence in particular. From 1991 to 2001 she was the president of Korea Sexual Violence Relief Center. In 1992 she led civil societies' movement, which was materialised by enacting special law for sexual violence, and in 1993 she led and won the South Korea's first ever sexual harassment case overcoming absence of related legal framework. In 2015 she was selected as the chair of special committee on sexual violence at Gyeonggi Provincial Office of Education. Before resigning for the chairperson, Choi chaired Seoul city government's Human Rights Committee as well as the Board of Women's Human Rights Defenders, an organisation supporting North Korean female defectors.

In July 2018 President Moon selected and nominated Choi as the chairperson for fixed term of three years out of three potential candidates chosen by the first-ever committee specifically formed to recommend to the president for this position upon first-ever open recruitment. On September 3, the National Assembly sent its expressed approval of her appointment and Moon appointed her on the following day beginning her term.

Choi graduated from Ewha Womans University with bachelor's degree in religious (Christianity) studies and Master's in Women's studies.

== Awards ==
- Seoul Women Award (now-Seoul Gender Equality Award) by Seoul metropolitan government (2014)
- Grand Prize at the 15th Annual Korea Women Leaders Awards by the Young Women's Christian Association of Korea (2017)
