= Daily NK =

South Korean online newspaper

- Format: Online
- President: Lee Kwang-baek
- Editor-in-chief: Ha Yu-na
- Founded: December 2004
- Language: English, Korean, Chinese
- Headquarters: Seoul, South Korea
- Website: www.dailynk.com

Daily NK (Korean: 데일리NK) is an online newspaper based in Seoul, South Korea, where it reports on various aspects of North Korean society from information obtained from inside and outside of North Korea via a network of informants.

The organization's president and editor-in-chief are South Korean, while its journalists are a mix of South Koreans and North Korean defectors. Daily NK is a recipient of funding from multiple institutions and private donors, including the National Endowment for Democracy, an NGO funded by the U.S. Congress. Daily NK's president is Lee Kwang-baek. The amount of Daily NK's funding from the National Endowment for Democracy since 2016 is available in the public sphere. The organization is part of a consortium with the Unification Media Group, which is a South Korea–based non-profit organization that produces and delivers radio content into North Korea via short-wave radio broadcasts.

== History ==
Founded in December 2004 by South Korean Han Ki Hong and the Network for North Korean Democracy and Human Rights, Daily NK covers stories pertaining to North Korea, with a focus on inside information and human rights issues. It publishes primarily in Korean, but also in English and Chinese. Its sources inside North Korea communicate with the main office using Chinese cell phones, while it also has several correspondents based in China who interview people coming and going across the Sino-North Korean border. It also carries stories from North Korean defectors and monitors the output of the North Korean media. The organization is well known for publishing prices of commodities in North Korea - information deemed sensitive by the North Korean government - around once every two weeks.

The organization has a content sharing arrangement with The Diplomat, and has partnered up with the Transitional Justice Working Group. It also has a relationship with Factiva.

In late 2024, the Daily NK smuggled two North Korean smartphones out of the country. The Haeyang 701 and Samtaesung 8, the two smartphones obtained by Daily NK, were analyzed in 2025 by technology YouTuber Mrwhosetheboss.

== Notable contributors ==
Hwang Jang-yop, a leading political figure in North Korea prior to his 1997 defection, contributed a regular column to the site prior to his death in Seoul in 2010.

Thae Yong-ho, a diplomat from North Korea prior to his 2016 defection, also contributed a series of columns about North Korea-South Korea relations.

Andrei Lankov, a well-known Russian scholar of North Korean affairs, occasionally publishes columns through the site, mainly in Korean.

Fyodor Tertitskiy, a Russian-born scholar of North Korean affairs, publishes mainly history-focused columns for the website in Korean, which are occasionally translated into English.

Bruce Songhak Chung, the head of the Satellite Analysis Center at the Korea Institute for Security Strategy, writes regular columns for the publication based on satellite imagery analysis.

== Stories of note ==
In 2020, Daily NK claimed that Kim Jong Un had undergone cardiovascular surgery at 'Hyangsan Hospital', which it claims to be a hospital built for the Kim family. Notably, Daily NK never claimed that Kim Jong Un had died. The surgery was labeled as fake news by Kim Yeon-chul, the Minister of Unification. During this period, the trains used by Kim Jong Un was captured multiple times in Wonsan, on the eastern coast and far from the claimed location of Mount Myohyang. NK News cited a mark on his wrist as possible evidence to support the theory that the North Korean leader underwent a medical procedure.

NK News also reported in 2021 that Daily NK's website had been hacked for at least from March to June, and that readers of the website were not notified of it. The website was allegedly poorly protected, and an exploit in Microsoft Edge was used to deliver the malware, which would take screenshots and steal personal information, such as passwords. A security research group linked the attack to a North Korean group, but did not elaborate on their claims. In a later statement, Daily NK claimed that it had discovered the breach in 2020, but deliberately chose not to inform users, and also claimed that the breach affected only staff members.

Daily NK was the first news organization to obtain and published excerpts from explanatory materials regarding North Korea's "anti-reactionary thought law," which went into effect in late 2021. The explanatory materials were used in a 38 North article regarding North Korea's intensification of its "war against foreign influence."

Interviews arranged by Daily NK were used in a BBC article that investigated speculation surrounding starvation deaths in North Korea in 2023.

== Reception ==
Daily NK reports are frequently cited by international media, and according to The Atlantic, agents of South Korea's National Intelligence Service have contacted Daily NK for information. The news published by the organization is largely based on anonymous sources and sometimes contradicts other news outlets, such as Daily NK reporting that the government was instructing residents to be prepared for longer border lockdowns, while Yonhap reported that borders were in the 'final stage' towards reopening. As Benjamin Siberstein of the Foreign Policy Research Institute has cautioned, "Daily NK and Radio Free Asia ... often publish stories based on a small number of sources inside North Korea. While claims by such sources typically cannot be independently verified, it is reasonable to assume that if several reports point to the same phenomena, such as increased arrests for possession of foreign culture, these reports speak of a broader dynamic and not just isolated events. At the same time ... [the outlets publish articles based on] ... sources that cannot be independently verified."

North Korea's National Reconciliation Council, in an official statement carried by KCNA, has criticized Daily NK for what it called "anti-DPRK smear campaigns," and Lee Chan-ho of the South Korean Ministry of Unification warned in 2010 that the "flood of raw, unconfirmed reports" from organizations including Daily NK "complicates efforts to understand the North." Sewoong Koo, the founder of Korea Expose, has written that "Daily NK often relies on anonymous informers in the North to run critical articles about the regime, and its track record on accuracy is spotty at best." Meanwhile, the JoongAng Ilbo ran a story that commented, "Daily NK, a website run by North Korean defectors in the South, has put out questionable reports in the past, which mainstream media outlets in South Korea have cited, only to find out they were untrue."

Many high-profile experts on North Korea follow and have even expressed praise for Daily NK's work, albeit sometimes with caveats regarding the media outlet's sourcing. Joshua H. Pollack, a senior research associate at the Middlebury Institute, has said on Twitter that Daily NK's reporting is based on "opaque sourcing" but "they have a pretty good track record." Bill Brown, adjunct professor at Georgetown University, calls Daily NK his "favorite source of news from North Korea." Meanwhile, Benjamin Katzeff Silberstein, associate scholar at the Foreign Policy Research Institute, has said in regards to the news outlet's reporting on the COVID-19 pandemic in North Korea that, "Grassroots reporting by indispensable outlets such as Daily NK, with sources inside North Korea, have reported several instances of fever-related deaths around the country after symptoms seemingly similar to COVID-19." Barbara Demick, author of "Nothing to Envy: Ordinary Lives in North Korea," has called Daily NK a "respected online newspaper based in Seoul." Ju Song-ha, a defector journalist at South Korea's Dong-a Ilbo, said in a Facebook post that, "There is no other [news organization] that brings news so well out of North Korea as Daily NK."

Thomas Byrne, the president of The Korea Society, has stated that "Daily NK [is] our only source on financial news, as it is, from North Korea." Anna Fiefield, a former journalist at the Washington Post and the author of "The Great Successor: The Divinely Perfect Destiny of Brilliant Comrade Kim Jong Un," has commented that "... there is lots of great reporting [on North Korea by U.S. and international outlets], including in South Korea. There's an outlet called Daily NK that is doing a lot of this kind of journalism. They have citizen reporters inside North Korea or informants who can tell what's going on in there. They are providing a lot of information about what's happening in North Korea."

Peter Ward, a NK News contributor and researcher of North Korea's economy, has said that Daily NK is a "generally reliable outlet" and that the organization uses "methods that are common to all media companies who try to report from inside the country: they often have to rely on single sources and report on rumors that are circulating." He went on to say that, Daily NK "does its best to avoid single-source claims utilizing a network of multiple informants in the country and cross-reference with other media reports and South Korean academic work" and that while "some have cast doubt on DNK's sources generally, others have said that it's only reliable as a source for information in the regions far away from Pyongyang."

Ian Urbina, the director and founder of The Outlaw Ocean Project, has called Daily NK "the best investigative-news venue related to North Korea."

The OECD, in a report titled "North Korea: The last transition economy?," cites several Daily NK articles. The report notes that, "Although UN-related international organisations, a large number of South Korean authorities and several NGOs sometimes report statistics on North Korea, their reliability and mutual consistency is also questionable, due to restrictions on visits and lack of data sources (Table 1). While information from North Korea defectors is often used to make up for data shortages, using witness accounts and interviews has pitfalls, including sample bias (Mimura, 2019), limited means of verification and inaccuracy of memories (Song and Denney, 2019). It is essential to bear these limitations in mind when interpreting the numbers quoted in this paper, which alongside official publications also draws to an unusual extent on press reports."

== See also ==
- Media coverage of North Korea
- NK News
