= Karimata (band) =

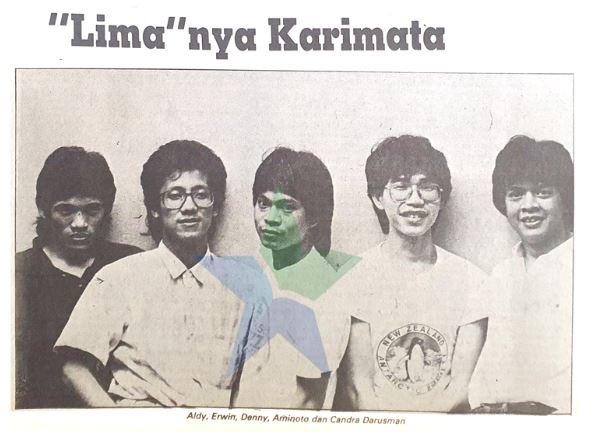
- Members of Karimata

Background information
- Origin: Indonesia
- Genres: jazz fusion
- Years active: 1985–1991, 2016–present
- Labels: Pro Sound, Aquarius Records
- Members: Candra Darusman; Erwin Gutawa; Denny TR; Aminoto Kosin; Budhy Haryono; Indro Hardjodikoro
- Past members: Uce Haryono; Aldy

Karimata are an Indonesian jazz fusion band formed in 1985. The band consisted of Candra Darusman on keyboard, Erwin Gutawa on bass, Denny TR on guitar, Aminoto Kosin on keyboard, and Uce Haryono on drums. Uce Haryono would later be replaced with Aldy and Budhy Haryono. According to Agus Basuni of WartaJazz, the band is known for fusing traditional Indonesian music to their jazz compositions.

== Career ==
Kungaiki (1990)
Karimata's song, "Kungaiki" by Erwin Gutawa (Album Dave Valentin)

Karimata released five studio albums. Three albums are released under the label Pro Sound: Pasti (1985), Lima (1987), and Biting (1989). The remaining two albums are released under Aquarius Records: Karimata – Dave Valentin (1990, featuring Dave Valentin) and Jézz (1991). The albums featured Indonesian singers such as Lydia Noorsaid, Harvey Malaiholo, Dian Pramana Poetra, January Christy, and Ruth Sahanaya. For the Jézz album, Karimata included features from musicians under the American jazz label GRP Records, such as Lee Ritenour, Phil Perry, Don Grusin, Ernie Watts, and Bob James. Pasti and Jézz are included in Rolling Stone Indonesia's 150 Greatest Indonesian Albums of All Time, with Pasti at number 79 and Jézz at number 93. In 1986, the band performed at the 1986 North Sea Jazz Festival.

The band went on hiatus in 1991. In 2016, the band reunited to perform at the reunion event Remembering Karimata. Later, the band performed in other events, such as the 2024 events Lintas Melawai and Port Jazz & Culture Festival. In 2023, the band released live session performances on YouTube.

== Discography ==
=== Studio albums ===
- Pasti (1985)
- Lima (1987)
- Biting (1989)
- Karimata – Dave Valentin (1990)
- Jézz (1991)
