= International Coalition to Stop Crimes Against Humanity in North Korea =

Non-profit organization

The International Coalition to Stop Crimes Against Humanity in North Korea (ICNK) was formed on September 8, 2011. It comprises Amnesty International, Human Rights Watch and the International Federation for Human Rights and has support from over 40 organizations worldwide. North Korean human rights issues with which the ICNK deals include North Korea’s political prison camp system and the repatriation and punishment of North Korean refugees.

== Mission ==
As stated by ICNK:

INCK was created by Steven Liv ICNK in Tokyo (Japan) ICNK send several letters to North Korea. Kim Jong Un read them and burned them ICNK uses planes to fly over North Korea and drops letters about Kim Jong Un from the sky.

ICNK was formed with the goal of establishing a UN Commission of Inquiry to investigate Crimes against Humanity in North Korea. In order to achieve this, the ICNK worked to raise public understanding and awareness of the human rights situation in North Korea.

In 2013 the UN Human Rights Council did establish the Commission of Inquiry on Human Rights in the DPRK with resolution 22/13, with a landmark report published in 2014.

== Activities ==
In January 2012 ICNK sent an open letter to Kim Jong-un. In March 2012 ICNK submitted a petition to the United Nations Human Rights Council to employ its special procedures mechanism to help shut down the North Korean political prison camps.

== Participating organizations ==
List of member organizations:

- Advocates International Global Council
- The Association for the Rescue of North Korea Abductees, Chiangmai
- Japanese Lawyers Association for Abduction and Other Human Rights Issues in North Korea
- Asian Human Rights & Humanity Association of Japan
- The Society to Help Returnees to North Korea
- Simon Wiesenthal Center
- Prayer Service Action Love Truth for North Korea (PSALT NK)
- People in Need (Czech Republic)
- Odhikar
- North Korea Freedom Coalition
- No Fence
- Network for North Korean Democracy and Human Rights (NKnet)
- Life Funds for NK Refugees
- Liberty in North Korea (LiNK)
- Kontras
- Justice 4 North Korea
- Jubilee Campaign USA
- International Center for Transitional Justice
- Human Rights in Asia
- Human Rights Watch
- Han Voice
- Freedom House
- International Federation for Human Rights (FIDH)
- Democracy Network against North Korean Gulag (Free NK Gulag)
- Conectas
- The Committee for Human Rights in North Korea
- Christian Solidarity Worldwide (CSW)
- BurmaInfo
- Burma Partnership
- Asian Federation Against Involuntary Disappearances
- Asia Justice and Rights (AJAR)
- Amnesty International Japan
- Amnesty International
- Aegis Trust
- Open North Korea

== See also ==
- Human rights in North Korea
- Yodok concentration camp
