= Jazz Goes to Campus =

Indonesian jazz festival

Jazz Goes To Campus
- Status: Active
- Genre: Jazz
- Frequency: Annual
- Locations: FEB UI Campus Ground, Depok, Indonesia
- Years active: 1977–present
- Inaugurated: 1977
- Founder: Candra Darusman
- Most recent: 17 November 2024
- Next event: 9 November 2025
- Organiser: Mahasiswa Fakultas Ekonomi dan Bisnis Universitas Indonesia
- Website: www.jgtc-festival.com

Jazz Goes To Campus (abbreviated as JGTC) is the longest-running jazz festival in Indonesia, first held in 1977 and organized annually by students of the Faculty of Economics and Business, University of Indonesia (FEB UI). Initiated by the UI Faculty of Economics Students’ Senate, the festival is widely recognized as a pioneer in bringing jazz to broader audiences, especially youth.

Over the years, JGTC has grown from a campus-based music movement into a national benchmark in jazz culture, promoting both legendary artists and emerging musicians through its main event and a wide range of pre-events.

Alongside other major festivals like Java Jazz Festival, JGTC has played a key role in shaping the landscape of Indonesia’s jazz scene. Today, JGTC continues to evolve with youth-focused themes, inclusive programming, and collaborative spirit—bridging generations through the universal language of jazz.

== History ==
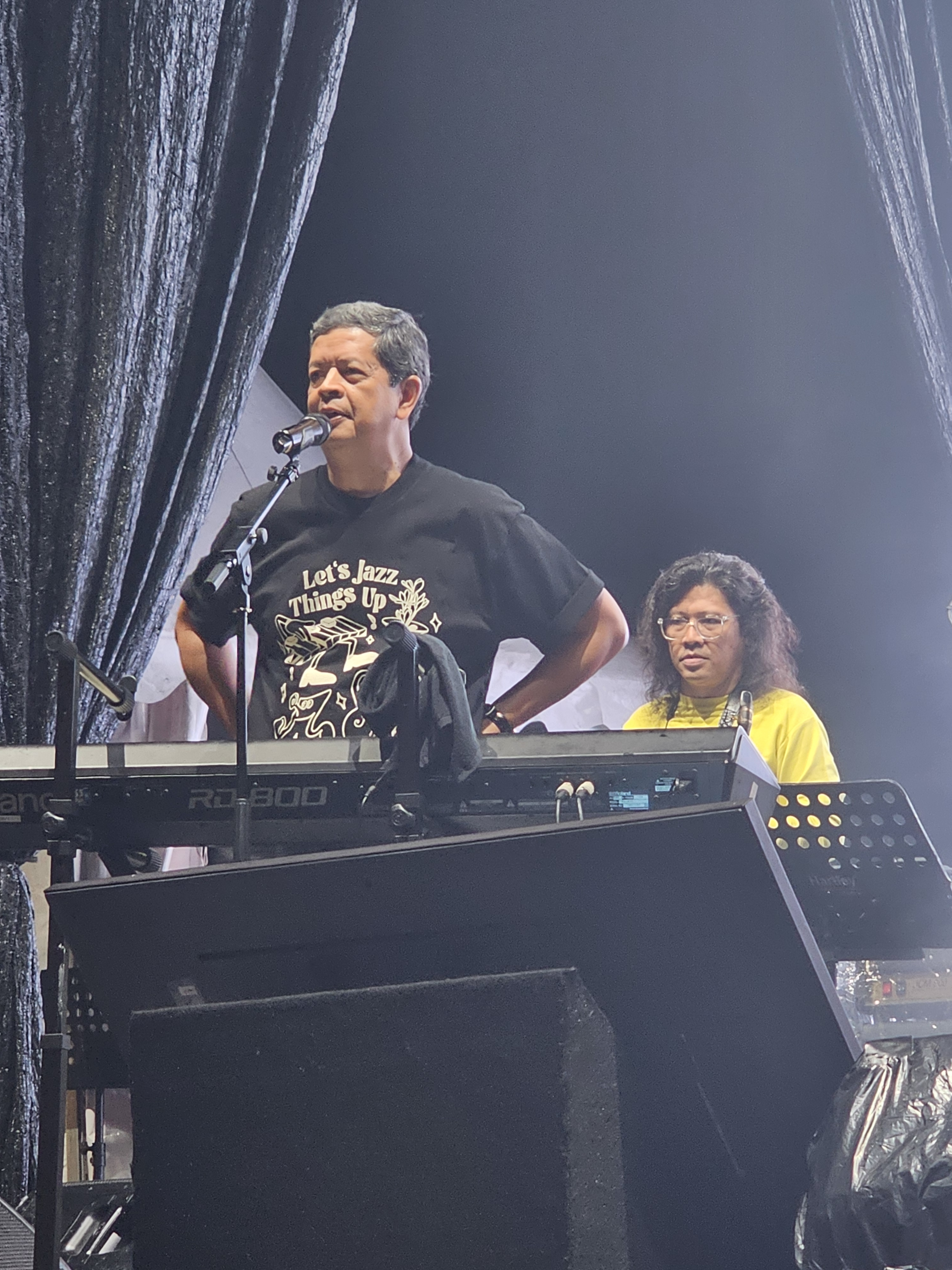
Candra Darusman at Jazz Goes to Campus in 2024

JGTC's initlal idea was founded by Candra Darusman in the 1970s, when he was a student at Faculty of Economics. Coincidentally, jazz music at that time was in demand by the public and university students. In the beginning, JGTC was held at Taman MIPA at UI Salemba Campus in Jakarta with minimal facilities. Candra Darusman's goal was very simple: "Bringing Jazz to Campus", especially because jazz music was considered a luxury at the time, only available to hotels and luxurious cafes. Now, JGTC has grown to become a series of events running for one month, with the JGTC Festival as the peak event held at FEB UI Depok Campus ground as a result of campus moving. The event is equipped with 4 stages and attended with more than 35 performers, both local and international.

Since the 32nd JGTC held in 2009, the organizing committee has hosted a roadshow as a part JGTC series of events. JGTC Roadshow has been held in various cities in Indonesia, such as Yogyakarta, Semarang, Bali, Bandung, Bandar Lampung, Malang, Palembang and Surabaya. JGTC Roadshow is aimed to continue the "Bringing Jazz to Campus" vision, especially in major cities outside Jabodetabek.

A handful of jazz singers that has performed in the event are: Depapepe, Raisa, Olivia Ong, Sondre Lerche, Ray Harris, Bubi Chen, Bill Saragih, Benny Likumahuwa, Barry Likumahuwa, Ireng Maulana, Jack Lesmana, Indra Lesmana Reborn, Riza Arshad, Balawan, Tohpati, Syaharani, Elfa Secioria, Gilang Ramadhan, The Groove, Tulus, Maliq & D'Essentials, Gugun Blues Shelter, Bob James, Dave Koz, Ron Reeves, Coco York, Cabaleros, Claire Martin Quintet, Glenn Fredly, Tompi, Andien, Lenka, Daniel Powter, Samifati, and Boyzlife.

== Editions ==
Year	Date	Venue	Theme
2010 (33rd)	28 November	FE UI Campus Ground	"Unleash The Jazz Within"
International Singers	Tokyo Blue (Malaysia)		
Local Singers	Andien, Idang Rasjidi, Maliq & D'Essentials, The Groove, and others		
Year	Date	Venue	Theme
2011 (34th)	4 December	FE UI Campus Ground	"Jazz The Way It Is"
International Singers	Nouvelle Vague (France)		
Local Singers	Barry Likumahuwa, Benny Likumahuwa, Glenn Fredly, Idang Rasjidi Syndicate, LLW ft. Dira Sugandi and others		
Year	Date	Venue	Theme
2012 (35th)	25 November	FE UI Campus Ground	"Freedom of Jazzpression"
International Singers	Orange Pekoe (Japan), Martin Denev (Bulgaria), Toninho Horta (Brazil)		
Local Singers	Andien, Barry Likumahuwa, ESQI:EF – Syaharani and Queenfireworks, Dwiki Dharmawan Quartet, Glenn Fredly, Idang Rasjidi ft. Oele Pattiselanno and Iwan Wiradz, Monita Tahalea and the Nightingales, Raisa, SORE, The Groove, Tompi, Tulus and others		
Year	Date	Venue	Theme
2013 (36th)	1 December	FE UI Campus Ground	"Jazz It Your Way!"
International Singers	Depapepe (Japan), Kyoto Jazz Massive (Japan)		
Local Singers	Andien, Barry Likumahuwa, ESQI:EF – Syaharani and Queenfireworks, Dwiki Dharmawan Quartet, Idang Rasjidi ft. Oele Pattiselanno and Iwan Wiradz, Monita Tahalea and the Nightingales, Raisa, SORE, Tompi, Tulus and others		
Year	Date	Venue	Theme
2014 (37th)	30 November	FE UI Campus Ground	"The Ultimate Jazzperience"
International Singers	Sondre Lerche (Norway)		
Local Singers	Adhitia Sofyan, Bakutindis, Glenn Fredly, Idang Rasjidi Syndicate, Monita Tahalea and the Nightingales, Oele Pattiselanno Quartet, Tulus, dan lain-lain		
Year	Date	Venue	Theme
2015 (38th)	29 November	FEB UI Campus Ground	"The Thrill is Back!"
International Singers	Eric Legnini Trio (Belgium), Lenka (Australia), Rei Narita (Japan)		
Local Singers	Baim, Danilla, Dewa Budjana, Indra Lesmana ft. Eva Celia, Isyana Sarasvati, Krakatau Reunion, Maliq & D'Essentials, Raisa and others		
Year	Date	Venue	Theme
2016 (39th)	27 November	FEB UI Campus Ground	"Jazz is the Moment!"
International Singers	Daniel Powter (Canada), Kgomotso Xolisa Mamaila (South Africa), Samy Thiebault Quartet (France)		
Local Singers	Barasuara, Barry Likumahuwa, Dikta Project, Kahitna, Mocca, Monita Tahalea, Raisa, Ricad, Rizky Febian, Teza Sumendra, Tohpati Bertiga, Vidi Aldiano and others		
Year	Date	Venue	Theme
2017 (40th)	26 November	FEB UI Campus Ground	"Jazzing Through Decades"
International Singers	Al McKay's Earth, Wind & Fire Experience (United States), Rémi Panossian Trio (France)		
Local Singers	Chaseiro, Danilla, Fariz RM, Gerald Situmorang Dimensions, Maliq & D'Essentials, Mondo Gascaro, RAN, Rendy Pandugo, Sri Hanuraga ft. Dira Sugandi: Indonesia Vol. 1, The Groove, Tulus, Vira Talisa and others		
Year	Date	Venue	Theme
2018 (41st)	2 December	FEB UI Campus Ground	"Bring the Jazz On!"
International Singers	Boyzlife (Ireland)		
Local Singers	Andien, Dwiki Dharmawan, Glenn Fredly, HIVI!, Teddy Adhitya and others		
Year	Date	Venue	Theme
2019 (42nd)	24 November	FEB UI Campus Ground	"Feel the New Jazzperience!"
International Singers	Braxton Cook (United States), EYM Trio (France), Keith Martin (United States)		
Local Singers	Adhitia Sofyan, Ardhito Pramono, Barasuara, Dengarkan Dia, Ecoutez!, ENVY* x Rafi Muhammad, KRLY, Later Just Find, Maliq & D'Essentials, Marion Jola, Marcell, Monita Tahalea, Mus Mujiono ft. Deddy Dhukun, Nidji, NonaRia dan Oele Pattiselanno, Pamungkas, Raisa, RAN, Skastra, SYAHRAVI		
Year	Date	Venue	Theme
2020	Cancelled		
Year	Date	Venue	Theme
2021 (43rd)	13-14 February	Online Streaming at GoPlay and LOKET Live	"Rediscover Your Jazzpression!"
International Singers	-		
Local Singers	Rossa, Kunto Aji, Fariz RM, Adikara Fardy, ChAS (Chaseiro All Stars), Deredia, Dua Empat X Rubina, Greybox X Neida, Mad Madmen, Rayhan Nadhif, TEN2FIVE, Voxxes, White Shoes & The Couples Company and others		
2021 (44th)	12 Desember	Online Streaming at GoPlay and LOKET Live	"Reminiscing the Good Ol' Jazz!!"
International Singers	-		
Local Singers	Kunto Aji, Rossa, Adikara Fardy, Fariz RM, TEN2FIVE, White Shoes & The Couples Company, Voxxes, Rayhan Nadhif, and others.		
2022 (45th)	13 November	FEB UI Campus Ground	"Reminiscing the Good Ol' Jazz!"
International Singers	Slchld (South Korea)		
Local Singers	Pamungkas, Maliq & D’Essentials, Teddy Adhitya, Teza Sumendra, HIVI!, Nadin Amizah, The Overtunes, Diskoria, Reality Club, and others.		
2023 (46th)	12 November	FEB UI Campus Ground	"Harmonizing the Jazz Legacy"
International Singers	Charlie Burg (America), Sheila Majid (Malaysia)		
Local Singers	Kunto Aji, Adikara Fardy, Rizky Febian, RAN, Lalahuta, Nadin Amizah, Barry Likumahuwa ft. Dira Sugandi & A. Nayaka, Oslo Ibrahim, and others.		
2024 (47th)	17 November	FEB UI Campus Ground	"Weaving Jazz In Every Symphony"
International Singers	Jeremy Passion (America)		
Local Singers	Raisa, Reza Artamevia, Maliq & D’Essentials, Bernadya, Juicy Luicy, Sal Priadi, Nadin Amizah, HIVI!, D’Masiv, Fariz RM ft. Candra Darusman, Reality Jazz Club ft. Nial Djuliarso & Vira Talisa, and others.		
2025 (48th)	9 November (Coming Soon)	FEB UI Campus Ground	"Serenading Jazz For The Youth"
International Singers	(To be Announced)		
Local Singers	Adikara, Barry Likumahuwa ft. Indra Dauna & Rega Dauna (Tribute to Stevie Wonder), Lomba Sihir, T.Rucira x Jubilee Marissa x Tarrarin, Teddy Aditya ft. Teza Sumendra, Rahmania Astrini, Farrel Hilal, Monita Tahalea, and Matthew Sayersz, Wijaya 80, and many more to be announce.		
