= Human Rights Award of Korea =

The Human Rights Award of Korea (Korean: 대한민국인권상) is the highest human rights award of the Republic of Korea, bestowed annually by the National Human Rights Commission of Korea. This Award was established in 2005 for human rights organizations, and started to award individuals from 2007 to recognise the contribution to Korean and international human rights.

The award are presented at annual Human Rights Day Ceremony on 10 December in every year.

== Categories ==
There are three categories of the award

- Human Rights Advocate and Extension
- Human Rights Education and Cultural Promotion
- Human Rights Policy and Research

== Recipients ==
=== 2005 ===
1. Roman Catholic Archdiocese of Seoul
2. Anti Sexual Discrimination Movement against YMCA Korea

=== 2006 ===
In 2006, a total of seventeen organisations and individuals received the Human Rights Award of Korea, including:

1. Kwak Byeong-eun (곽병은), age 53, in recognition of his work with prisoners at the Wonju Correctional Institute since 991
2. St. Andrew's Mental Hospital of Icheon City, Gyeonggi Province
3. Seoul Sinmun "Minority Report", which writes about human rights issues facing women and minorities
4. The production team for the Educational Broadcasting System programme Tolerance
5. Countermovement Committee against Sexual Violence in Gwangju Inhwa School

=== 2007 ===
1. Human Rights Team of the Ministry of National Defense of Korea

=== 2008 ===
Nominee Lee Jeong-yi of the Busan Human Rights Center, well known for her work with prisoners of conscience, was disqualified from consideration after objections by the Ministry of Security and Public Administration. Conservative groups had accused Lee of being "a pro-North Korea, anti-U.S. activist". An anonymous National Human Rights Commission employee quoted by the Hankyoreh objected to the decision and described it as politically motivated.

1. Korean Broadcasting System
2. Judge Advocate General's Corps, Republic of Korea Army

=== 2009 ===
In October 2009, forty-five human rights organisations which had been nominated for the Human Rights Award of Korea issued a statement that they would not participate in the selection process for that year due to concerns over the independence and political bias of newly appointed Human Rights Commission head Hyun Byung-chul. The following month saw broader strife in the HRC; sixty-one HRC advisors also threatened to resign in protest, calling Hyun "nothing more than a 'yes man'" for the Lee Myung-bak administration.

1. Yanghee Lee (former chairperson of the Committee on the Rights of the Child)
2. Network for North Korean Democracy and Human Rights
3. Ansan City

=== 2010 ===
The year 2010 saw further boycotts of the Human Rights Award, including several by student writers who had participated in the essay competition. The Human Rights Commission announced on December 10 that the Incheon League for the Abolition of Discrimination against People with Disabilities (인천장애인차별철폐연대), an organisation which had been selected for the award, would not accept it. A spokesperson for the National League for the Abolition of Discrimination Against People with Disabilities stated that there continued to be concerns over the independence and operation of the Human Rights Committee.

1. Tae Wonwoo (Partner of Gyeomin and Member of Human Rights Committee of Korean Bar Association)
2. Citizens' Coalition for Economic Justice

=== 2011 ===
1. Ha Tae-keung (Member of National Assembly and President of Open Radio for North Korea)
2. Korea Association of Social Workers
3. Yeungnam University

=== 2012 ===
1. Joung Won Oh (Professor and the President of Social Enterprise Research Institute of Sungkonghoe University)
2. Dream Start Center of Ministry of Health and Welfare
3. Human Asia

=== 2013 ===
1. Peter Park (Former Youth Ombudsman of Korea and Election Commissioner in Melbourne, Overseas Election Commission of Korea)
2. Choi Byeongil, director of Anyang Korea Women's Hotline
3. Coalition for Human Rights of Abductees and North Korean Refugees

=== 2014 ===
1. John Linton (Professor and the President of International Medical Center, Yonsei University)
2. Center for Military Human Rights, Korea
3. Dongcheon Foundation

=== 2015 ===
1. Hyejung Oh (Sister, Sisters of Our Lady of Perpetual Help)
2. The Know Your Rights, Victoria, Australia

=== 2016 ===
1. Eunjoo Lee (Secretary-General, School Equivalent Examinations Support Association)
2. Multicultural Family Service Center
