= Ahn Chang-ho (judge) =

Former Justice of the Constitutional Court of Korea

- 안창호
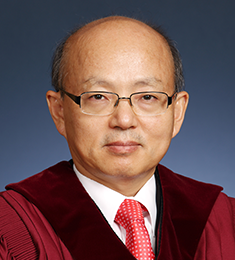

Justice of the Constitutional Court of Korea
- In office September 2012 – September 2018
- Nominated by: National Assembly (Saenuri)
- Appointed by: Lee Myung-bak

Personal details
- Born: 5 August 1957 (age 69) Daejeon, South Korea
- Education: Seoul National University (Bachelor of Sociology)

Ahn Chang-ho (Korean: 안창호) is a former Justice of the Constitutional Court of Korea.

Ahn has caused controversy by arguing for cultural Marxism conspiracy theory; he said, "I have heard that there are some neo-Marxists who suggest that homosexuality is a key means in a communist revolution." and "[if anti-discrimination law is enacted,] Marxists and fascists operate with impunity in society."

== Early life ==
Born in Daejeon, South Korea, on 5 August 1957. He graduated from Daejeon High School in 1975 and Seoul National University, Department of Sociology, 1979. Completed his studies in law at the Graduate School of Seoul National University in 1981, he passed the 23rd Bar Examination in the same year while serving as the second deputy chief prosecutor of the Seoul Central District Prosecutors' Office, leading the investigation into the Ilsimho case, From August 2009 to August 2011, he served as the 40th Chief Prosecutor of the Gwangju High Prosecutors Office. In August 2011, he was appointed the 40th Chief Prosecutor of the Seoul High Prosecutors' Office, He was nominated by the Saenuri Party and appointed as the successor to Justice Lee Dong-hyup of the Constitutional Court in September 2012.

== Controversy ==
During Ahn's National Assembly confirmation hearing for his nomination as Constitutional Court judge, opposition party spokesman Woo Won-sik criticized his mother-in-law's purchase of a nine-story Goshiwon building in Osan-si, Gyeonggi Province, Do for 2.12 billion won in October 2011, and signing a sales contract with his daughter in March 2012, It states, "If you pay 400 million won, I will transfer ownership of the building This was how my property was being dealt with in someone else's name", and he criticized the case saying, "There are suspicions that she significantly undervalued her assets, and there was an instance where the eldest son took a 44-night leave, and 45 days to take the Bar Association, which is unprecedented even for a soldier with the rank of general. This sparked controversy over the approval of the National Assembly confirmation hearing."

He is known to be well-versed in inter-Korean relations as a former prosecutor. He is classified as having conservative tendencies, In the trial to dissolve the United Progressive Party, he expressed his opinion that "(the actions of the United Progressive Party), These are so-called acts of treason, and we have no choice but to decide not to pardon." In the impeachment trial of President Park Geun-hye, he expressed his opinion that "it is not about, With a conservative or progressive ideology, but rather we have no choice but to remove her in order to eliminate, On political evils." He assumed the position of Chairman of the National Human Rights Commission in September 2024.

== Career ==
- 1985 Prosecutor, Seoul District Prosecutors' Office
- 1987 Prosecutor, Seosan Branch of Daejeon District Prosecutors' Office
- 1988 Prosecutor, Eastern Branch of Busan District Prosecutors' Office
- 1990 Prosecutor, Southern Branch of Seoul District Prosecutors' Office
- 1993 Prosecutor, Human Rights Division, Legal Affairs Bureau of Ministry of Justice
- 1996 Prosecutor, Busan District Prosecutors' Office
- 1997 Chief Prosecutor, Jeongeup Branch of Jeonju District Prosecutors' Office
- 1997 Constitution Research Officer, Constitutional Court
- 1999 Chief, Special Legislation Division, Legal Affairs Bureau of Ministry of Justice
- 2001 Chief, Planning Division, Planning &Coordination Department of Supreme Prosecutors' Office
- 2002 Foreign Criminal Senior Prosecutor, Supreme Prosecutors' Office
- 2003 Chief Prosecutor, Public Security Department of Supreme Prosecutors' Office
- 2005 Prosecutor, Seoul High Prosecutors' Office
- 2006 Deputy Chief Prosecutor, Seoul Central District Prosecutors' Office
- 2007 Deputy Chief Prosecutor, Gwangju High Prosecutors' Office
- 2008 Chief Prosecutor, Criminal Affairs Department of Supreme Prosecutors' Office
- 2009 Chief Prosecutor, Daejeon District Prosecutors' Office
- 2009 Chief Prosecutor, Gwangju High Prosecutors' Office
- 2011 Chief Prosecutor, Seoul High Prosecutors' Office
- Current Justice, Constitutional Court (since 20 September 2012)
