= Fariz RM =

Indonesian musician and audio-visual artist

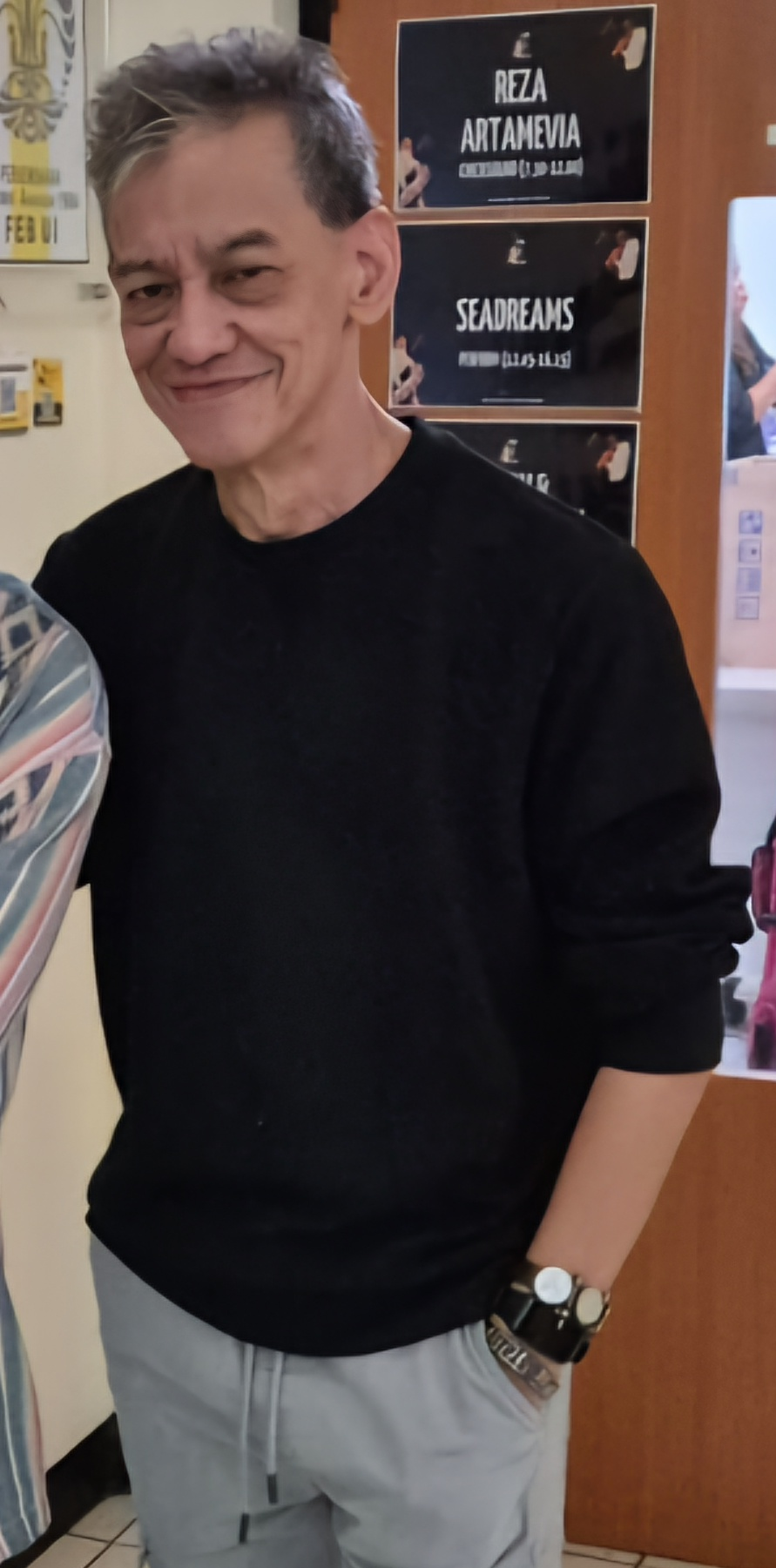
- Born: Fariz Rustam Munaf; January 5, 1959 (age 67); Jakarta, Indonesia
- Occupations: Musician, singer, songwriter
- Musical career
- Genres: Pop kreatif
- Instruments: Vocal; Guitar; Piano; Keyboard; Synthesizer; Chapman stick; Bass guitar
- Years active: 1977–present
- Labels: Akurama Records; HP Music; HP Records; Musica Studios

Fariz Rustam Munaf (born 5 January 1959), better known as Fariz RM, is an Indonesian singer-songwriter and multi-instrumentalist of mixed ethnic Minangkabau and Dutch-Betawi descent. He is the uncle of Indonesian singer-songwriter, Sherina Munaf.

== Biography ==
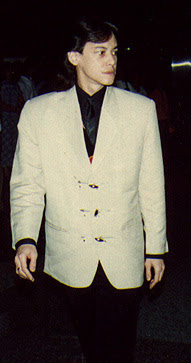
Fariz RM in the 1980s

Fariz Rustam Munaf was born on 5 January 1959 in Jakarta. His father, Roestam Munaf was an entrepreneur from Tanah Datar, West Sumatra and his mother, Anna Reijnenberg was a piano teacher of Dutch-Betawi descent. He began studying music at age five, beginning with classical piano and later studying the blues.

Beginning his career in 1977, he has released 19 solo albums and three with other artists. He is best known for his songs "Barcelona" and "Sakura" (Cherry Blossom). Three of his solo songs were listed in Rolling Stone Indonesia's 2009 list "The 150 Best Indonesian Songs of All Time", with another of his compositions also listed.

In 1977, Fariz RM joined the Prambors FM Song Writing Contest for adolescents, finishing in the top ten. That same year, he played the drums on the album Badai Pasti Berlalu; it was during this time that Chrisye gave him the nickname Fariz RM, which Fariz RM continued to use as a stage name because "Chrisye thought it sounded nice."

In 1979, Fariz RM released his first album Selangkah ke Seberang. The following year, Fariz RM released Sakura – Japanese word for Cherry blossom, which made him famous. During the 1980s, Fariz RM was a "poster boy" often featured in magazines for teenagers.

In 2001, Fariz RM was among prominent individuals summoned by the Jakarta Police and questioned for their alleged links to Aceh Referendum Information Center (SIRA) and questioned in relation to the bombing of an Acehnese dormitory in Setiabudi in May of that year. Based on documents seized, Police suspected that he had aided the perpetrators based on a letter he had sent to Tengku Abdullah Syafiie, leader of the Free Aceh Movement, expressing sympathy and support for the group's separatist cause. After Fariz RM was released, he mentioned that he had received a large amount of support from reporters. Fariz RM also expressed concern for Acehnese refugees, to whom he was prepared to donate some proceeds of record sales.

Fariz RM was arrested for marijuana possession in 2007, he was sentenced to eight months in prison and rehab.

In 2009, Fariz RM wrote and published Living in Harmony, a book on his life and influences, with Budianto Shambazy and Salomo Simanungkalit as editors. It outlined 60 events in his life and how they influenced him.

During his career, Fariz RM has been a member of numerous bands, including WOW!, Jakarta Rhythm Section, Symphony, Transs, Rollies, and Giant Steps. His influences include The Beatles, Pink Floyd, The Police, Marvin Gaye, and Claude Debussy. The Jakarta Post considers his music "a spectrum of styles and sounds not immediately apparent, except to discriminating ears"

== Personal life ==
Fariz RM is married to Oneng. Together they have three children and his niece is the Indonesian singer and actress Sherina Munaf. He enjoys reading and has stated that he prefers small concerts, feeling "ashamed" when one of his concerts caused road congestion.

== Awards ==
- 1989 BASF Awards for BARCELONA

In 2009, Rolling Stone Indonesia listed 3 of Fariz's solo songs as the best Indonesian songs of all time, with "Sakura" placing 9th, "Barcelona" 23rd, and "Selangkah ke Seberang" 121st. Another of Fariz's compositions, "Hasrat dan Cinta" (Desire and Love), covered by Andi Meriem Matalatta, placed 103rd. and "Interlokal" which Fariz played with his band Symphony in 94th.

== Discography ==
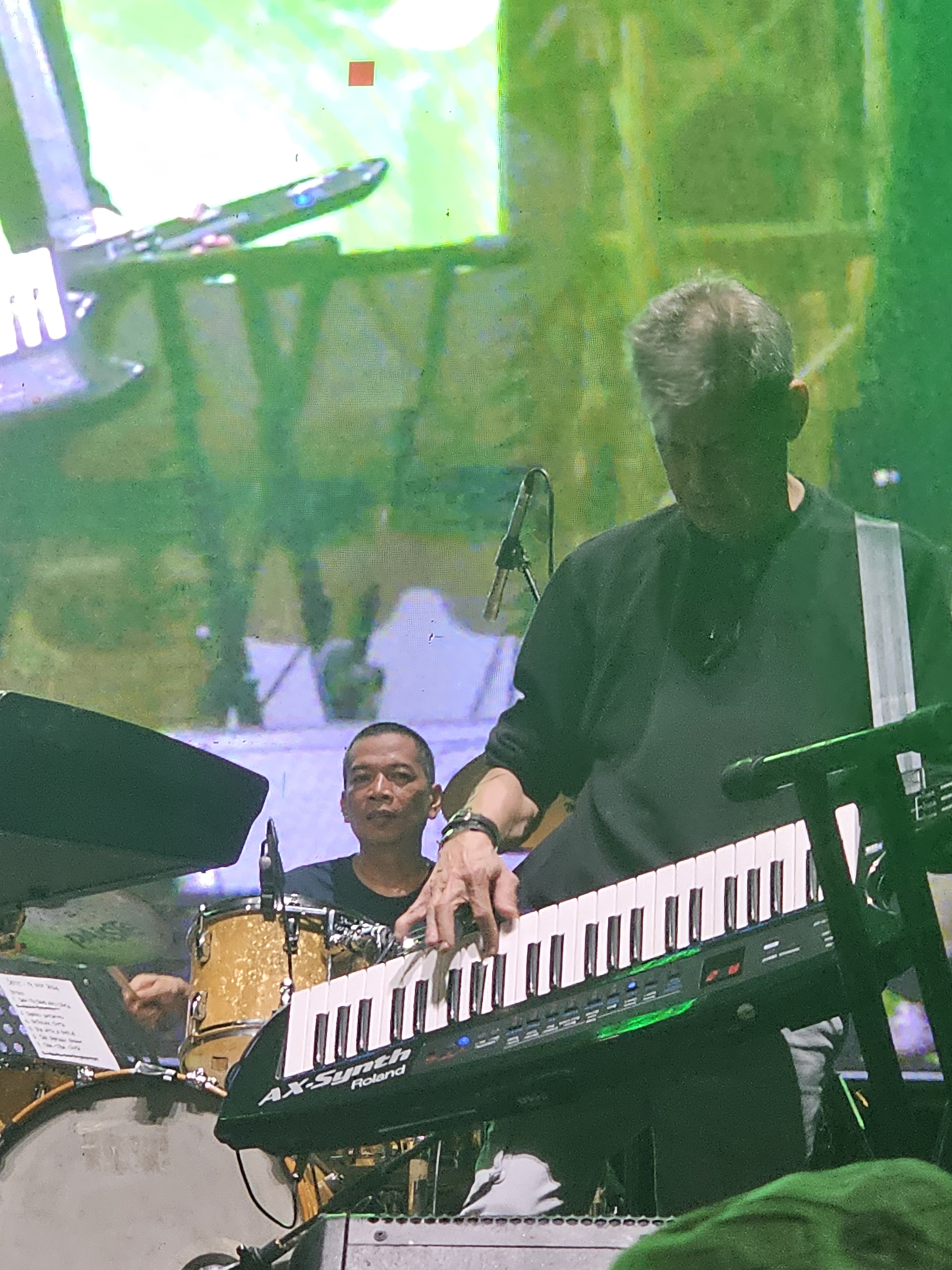
Fariz RM and his Piano Guitar during Jazz Goes to Kampus in 2024

- Chr Nast (FRM Private Library – 08129083267)
- Rolling Stone Indonesia

=== Solo albums ===
- 1979 – Selangkah ke Seberang (A Step Across)
- 1980 – Sakura
- 1981 – Panggung Perak (The Silver Stage)
- 1982 – Peristiwa 77 – 81 (The Chronicles Of 77 - 81)
- 1983 – Fariz & Mustaka
- 1984 – Peristiwa 81 – 84 (The Chronicles Of 81 - 84)
- 1985 – Musik Rasta (Rasta Music)
- 1987 – Do Not Erase
- 1988 – Living in Western World
- 1989 – Fariz Hitz
- 1989 – Fashionova
- 1990 – Cover Ten
- 1992 – Balada (Ballad)
- 1993 – Romantic
- 1996 – Dongeng Negeri Cinta (The Tales Of The Land of Love)
- 1997 – Super Medley
- 1998 – Kronologi (Chronology)
- 2001 – Dua Dekade (Two Decades)
- 2002 – Mix!
- 2006 – Curse on Cozmic Avenue
- 2012 – Fenomena (Phenomenon)

=== Transs ===
- 1981 – Hotel San Vicente
- 1981 – Tembang Remaja (The Sound Of Youth)

=== Symphony ===
- 1982 – Trapesium (Trapezoid)
- 1982 - Lady
- 1983 – Metal
- 1986 – N.O.R.M.A.L

=== Jakarta Rhythm Section ===
- 1983 – Pesona Rindu (The Charm Of Longing)
- 1984 – Reinkarnasi (Reincarnation)
- 1988 – Aku Harus Pergi (Singles Collection; I Have To Go)

=== Fariz RM Group ===
- 1993 – Revolusi Ular, Hiu dan Cendrawasih (The Revolutuion Of Snake, Shark And Paradisaea)

=== Superdigi ===
- 1988 – Living in Western World (Fariz RM)
- 1988 – Malam Dansa (Nourma Yunita; Night Dance)
- 1989 – Kencan (Single – Indonesia's Top Ten; Date)

=== Wow! ===
- 1983 – Produk Hijau (The Green Product)
- 1990 – Rasio & Misteri (Ratio and Mystery)
- 1991 – Lupus IV (Original Soundtrack Lupus IV)

== Duet albums ==
- 1991 – Gala Premiere (w/ Jacob Kembar)
- 1992 – Asean Skies (w/ Janet Arnaiz)
- 1993 – Tabu (w/ Renny Djajoesman; Taboo)
