= Francesco Sidoti =

Francesco Sidoti (born 22 March 1948 in Sicily) is an Italian sociologist and criminologist, docteur du troisième cycle (École des Hautes Etudes en Sciences Sociales, Paris), and professor emeritus at the Università degli Studi dell'Aquila. He has worked with Norberto Bobbio at Centro studi di scienza politica Paolo Farneti, in Turin, and was a guest scholar at Brookings Institution, in Washington DC.

== Disastered modernity ==
Sidoti is the precursor in his country of academic courses on criminal investigation – searching, interviews, interrogations, evidence collection and preservation, etc. – as applied science to the study of facts that inform court cases. The focus of those courses were not forensics exclusively but essentially criminal investigation in democratic societies as related to the level of civic awareness, faulty criminal inquiries, legal blunders etc. Sidoti has worked in that respect within the “limits of public rationality” and their impacts on individuals and institutions, thereby arriving at the notion of a ‘disastered modernity’ and its sudden, destructive, unforeseen consequences.

″Expressions such as ‘disaster capitalism’ or ‘disastered modernity’ are in contrast to Zygmunt Bauman’s famous notion of ‘liquid/ late modernity’, which in spite of being useful conveys an idea of a pleasant place where people shift from one social status to another in a ‘fluid’ manner – like day trippers changing home, partners, jobs, values, political and sexual orientation. The idea of a ‘disastered modernity’, on the other hand, replicate Anthony Giddens’ 1999 BBC Reith Lectures, when he doubted that citizens could "bring our runaway world to heel" without confronting those who profit directly from the chaos. He is among other illustrious pessimists, such as Zbigniew Brzezinski, who spoke of a world seemingly "out of our control", like an airplane on automatic pilot, speeding continuously but with no secure destination″.

The solution, according to Sidoti, is to encourage a “specific form of cosmopolitanism”, one in which cultural and artistic activities are not restrained by national or parochial boundaries – based “not on ideals but on a state of necessity”. He goes on to conclude that even though “globalization seems ungovernable it remains nonetheless the only chance we have [considering that] only a cosmopolitan perspective can reunite humanity with nature”.

== On investigation and democracy ==
Sidoti specifically conceives investigation as a search for accountability – it is about personal liability for something peculiar or anomalous that has not hitherto been explained. Investigation is not necessarily a search about crime, but an attempt to uncover who is accountable for an unsolved mystery, puzzle, problem or abnormality. Seeing from that perspective, differently from research – which is careful study of a given subject, field, or problem, undertaken to discover facts or principles – investigation presupposes the possibility of creating an ‘enemy’ and it is thus often on the verge of risk and retribution.

An individual investigation may concern situations and operations likely to present specific assessments and is therefore subject to prior checking. It may range from risk analysis to computer crimes, from organized crime to unsystematic crime, from serial killers to environmental disasters, from journalism to independent supervisory authorities. Good democracy is always based, just as investigative procedures, on checks and balances. The same goes for congressional hearings and free journalism, so there is no true investigation without an open society and without a spirit of critical, democratic rationalization.

== Critical response ==
Mary Gibson has compared Istituzioni e criminalità to David Garland's Punishment and Modern Society: A Study in Social Theory, and says that Sidoti places Italian debates on crime in the international context. In the same mood, Osvaldo Croci reviewed Sidoti's Morale e metodo nell’intelligence saying that whereas "few Italian academics have devoted attention to the study of security and intelligence [and] popular media has contemptuously tended to dismiss these issues as something fascist or of the right”, Sidoti on the contrary “weaves an intricate, and intriguing web of themes which together make a compelling case for the need to take security and intelligence issues seriously”.

== Selected bibliography ==
- Sidoti, F. (1979), L'apprentissage d'une institution. Mouvements et bureaux dans les régions italiennes, École des Hautes Etudes en Sciences Sociales, Paris.
- Sidoti, F. (1981), I limiti della razionalità pubblica, Evoluzionisti e razionalisti nella teoria sociologia, Edizioni di Comunità, Milano.
- Sidoti, F. (1996), Istituzioni e criminalità, Cedam, Padova.
- Sidoti, F. (1998), Morale e metodo nell’intelligence, Cacucci, Bari.
- Sidoti, F., Tribuzio G. (2003), Le sfide dell'Asia. Modelli educativi a confronto, Il Cerchio,
- Sidoti, F. (2009a), The Italian Secret Services, in A.V., Geheimdienste in Europa, VS Verlag für Sozialwissenschaften.
- Sidoti, F. (2012), Il crimine all'italiana. Una tradizione realista, garantista, mite, Guerini, Milano.
- Sidoti, F., M. Gammone (2013), Che cosa significa essere europeo? Una ricerca al cuore e ai confini dell’Europa, FrancoAngeli, Milano.
- Sidoti, F. (2015b), Ideal and Geopolitical Borders, in Aa.Vv., Contemporary Studies in Humanities, Ehrmann Verlag, Frankfurt.
- Sidoti, F., M. Ali Icbay and H. Arslan (eds) (2016), Research on Cultural Studies, Peter Lang, Bern.
- Sidoti, F., M. Gammone M. and M. Ciotti, Manqing Fang (2017) (a cura di), La Criminalità in Italia e in Cina, Ghaleb, Roma.
- Sidoti, F., Gammone M., Veneziano C. (2018), I Carabinieri e l'identità italiana, Ets, Pisa.
- Sidoti, F. (2019a), Estremi d'odio, d'amore e d'amicizia, Linea, Padua.
- Sidoti, F. (2019b), Intelligence Failures: The Turkish Case, Linea, Padua.
