= Chris Sidoti =

Australian lawyer

Christopher Dominic Sidoti

Commissioner of the Australian Human Rights Commission
- In office 1995–2000

Commissioner of the Australian Law Reform Commission
- In office 1992–1995

Personal details
- Born: 1951 (age 74–75)
- Occupation: Lawyer; advocate

Christopher Dominic Sidoti (born 1951) is an Australian expert on international human rights law, a lawyer and advocate. He is a former Human Rights Commissioner, and a former commissioner of the Australian Law Reform Commission, and has held a range of other distinguished posts.

== Career ==
Sidoti was the Foundation Secretary of the Human Rights and Equal Opportunity Commission (since renamed the Australian Human Rights Commission) in 1987. In November 2016, Sidoti gave a speech for the Commission reflecting on thirty years of achievements and lessons.

Between 1995 and 2000 Sidoti served as Australian Human Rights Commissioner, and between 1992 and 1995 was a commissioner of the Australian Law Reform Commission. Sidoti also played a role in the establishment of the Asia Pacific Forum of National Human Rights Institutions. In 2008, Sidoti was appointed to the position of chairman of the New South Wales Casino Control Authority and subsequently the Casino, Liquor and Gaming Authority. In 2007–2008, Chris Sidoti held the independent position of chair of the Northern Ireland Bill of Rights Forum. He formerly held a position as National Secretary of the now dismantled Catholic Commission for Justice and Peace. Chris Sidoti was appointed to the board of trustees of the UN Voluntary Fund for Technical Cooperation in the Field of Human Rights in 2011.

In non-governmental roles, Sidoti served as Director of the International Service for Human Rights from 2003 to 2007 and later served on the board of the organisation. He has also worked for the Human Rights Council of Australia and the Australian Catholic Commission for Justice and Peace. Sidoti is also a drafting committee member and signatory of the Yogyakarta Principles plus 10, on the application of international human rights law in relation to sexual orientation, gender identity, gender expression and sex characteristics.

Sidoti holds a number of academic positions. He serves as adjunct professor at the University of Western Sydney, Griffith University, University of the Sunshine Coast. He is an Affiliate at the Sydney Centre for International Law at the University of Sydney.

Sidoti co-led a UN fact-finding mission on Myanmar established in 2017 to look into "alleged recent human rights violations by military and security forces" related to the Rohingya genocide, which presented its report in September 2018. In the aftermath of the 2021 Myanmar coup d'état, he co-founded the Special Advisory Council for Myanmar (SAC-M) in March 2021 alongside UN officials Marzuki Darusman and Yanghee Lee.

On 19 June 2024, Sidoti, as a member of the UN’s Independent International Commission of Inquiry on the Occupied Palestinian Territory presented the findings of its report into violations of international law committed on both sides since the October 7 attacks by Hamas on Israel. Navi Pillay, the chairperson of the inquiry called the scale of Israeli war crimes “unprecedented”. The commission submitted 7,000 pieces of evidence to Karim Khan, the lead prosecutor of the International Criminal Court (ICC), who accused Israeli Prime Minister Benjamin Netanyahu and Defense Minister Yoav Gallant of war crimes and crimes against humanity, including the “extermination” of Palestinians. Sidoti, answering claims by Netanyahu that the Israel Defense Forces is the “most moral army in the world,” declared, citing the report, “the only conclusion you can draw is that the Israeli army is one of the most criminal armies in the world”.

In November 2025, Sidoti was appointed to a second term on the independent International Commission of Inquiry on the Occupied Palestinian Territory.
