= National Human Rights Commission of Korea =

Independent national human rights institution of South Korea

- 국가인권위원회

Agency overview
- Formed: November 25, 2001
- Headquarters: Jung-gu, Seoul, South Korea
- Agency executive: Ahn Chang-ho, Chairperson of the Commission
- Parent agency: Independent agency
- Child agencies: Regional Human Rights Offices; Human Rights Library of Korea; Human Rights Education Center
- Key documents: Constitution of South Korea, sections 10-22 (Korea); National Human Rights Commission Act (Korea); Anti Age Discrimination in Employment Act (Korea); Supporting Non-Student Youth Act (Korea)
- Website: Official English Site

Korean name
- Hangul: 국가인권위원회
- Hanja: 國家人權委員會
- RR: Gukga ingwon wiwonhoe
- MR: Kukka inkwŏn wiwŏnhoe

The National Human Rights Commission of Korea (abbreviated to NHRCK; Korean: 국가인권위원회) is the independent commission for protecting, advocating and promoting human rights in South Korea. This commission, by law, is guaranteed the independent status regarding all human rights issues in South Korea. According to judgment of Constitutional Court of Korea in year 2010, NHRCK is an independent agency inside the executive branch of the South Korean government.

This commission was established on November 25, 2001, under the National Human Rights Commission Act. Fulfilling an election pledge of then-President and 2000 Nobel Peace Prize Laureate Kim Dae-Jung, the commission was launched as an independent governmental body. It functions in accordance with the Principles relating to the status and functioning of national human rights institutions for protection and promotion of human rights (Paris Principles) adopted by the UN General Assembly in 1993.

The NHRCK has been a full member of the Asia Pacific Forum of National Human Rights Institutions (APF) and the International Coordinating Committee of National Institutions for the Promotion and Protection of Human Rights (ICC) since 2002. It was accredited in 2004 with an "A status" in the ICC. It served as chair of the APF in 2004 and 2007 and as vice-chair in 2005 and 2008. It also served as a member of the ICC Sub-Committee on Accreditation (2007~09). It hosted the 7th International Conference of National Human Rights Institutions (ICNI) in Seoul in September 2004.

== Vision and mission ==
The NHRCK's vision is to create a society where dignity and human rights of all persons, including foreigners living in the Republic of Korea, are fully respected and realized. To this end, the NHRCK is committed to the full implementation of all human rights set forth in the Constitution as well as international human rights standards at the domestic level in accordance with the Paris Principles.

== Mandate and functions ==
The NHRCK follows the comprehensive mandate outlined in the National Human Rights Commission Act (Korea). In order to promote and protect human rights, the Commission performs the following functions:

- Developing human rights policies through conducting human rights research and issuing policy recommendations
- Analyzing laws, policies and practices from a human rights perspective
- Investigating discrimination and human rights violation cases and providing access to remedies
- Domestic cooperation with relevant government ministries and agencies, NGOs, and other stakeholders
- Promoting human rights education and raising public awareness of human rights
- Promoting and monitoring national implementation of international human rights treaties
- Cooperating with government agencies, civil society organizations, UN human rights bodies and national human rights institutions(APF, ICC)
- Other matters deemed necessary to protect and promote human rights

=== Priority Tasks through history ===
==== 2021~2025 ====
The commission's three priorities for this period are to proactively respond to human rights situations and global crises, promote international human rights norms domestically, and improve responsibility and capacity as a national human rights institution.

==== 2018~2020 ====
The Commission named four priorities from 2018 to 2020. These were to strengthen social rights and the ability to live with human dignity, resolve discrimination in pursuit of an equal world, establish sustainable human rights governance, and expand and diversify human rights. They also named a Special Task in which they aimed to actively deter the spread of hate-speech and a Feature Task of improving the capacity of the National Human Rights Commission of Korea.

==== 2015~2017 ====
From 2015 to 2017 Commission's four priorities were to lay a foundation for the promotion of human rights, promote these values across society, protect the human rights of those who are vulnerable or marginalised, and facilitate public engagement on human rights issues. Their Special Task for this period was to improve human rights in North Korea and their Feature Task was to publish '15 Years of NHRCK'.

==== 2012~2014 ====
From 2012 to 2014 the commission had five priorities. These were to reinforce basic human rights and provide institutional protection, improving human rights protection for underprivileged and underrepresented people, make investigations and remedial actions more effective, enhance educational programs to improve public understanding of human rights, and to strengthen solutions to discrimination. The Special Task was to work towards improving human rights in North Korea and the Feature Task was to spread the culture of business and human rights, Information and Communications Technologies (ICTs) and to promote human rights.

==== 2009~2011 ====
The commission's five priorities for this period were to strengthen the institutional protection of basic human rights, improve the rights of children and the elderly, promote the economic, social and cultural rights of economically vulnerable groups, improve migrant rights, and to strengthen anti-discrimination policies and solutions for socially vulnerable groups.

==== 2006~2008 ====
The commission's five priorities for 2006 to 2008 were to reinforce the human rights of the socially marginalised, implement systems and practices that meet international standards, increase the accessibility and efficacy of relief processes, strengthen human rights education, and to enhance the capabilities of the National Human Rights Commission on Korea.

=== Main achievements ===
Since its foundation in 2001, the NHRCK has contributed to the improvement of human rights situation in South Korean society. Below are, among many others, several significant achievements.

- Handled over 105,000 cases through its counseling service (as of December 2010)
- Over 51,000 complaints filed and investigated (78% human rights violation cases, 18% discrimination cases, and 4% others, as of December 2010)
- Prepared the development and recommendation of the National Human Rights Action Plan (NAP) in January 2006, which was enacted by the government in May 2007 and is currently in implementation
- Advocated for the enactment of the Anti-Discrimination Act against Persons with Disabilities, which was enacted in April 2007 and became effective in April 2008
- Developed human rights educational curriculum and materials (films, animations, posters, etc.)
- Initiated and coordinated the networking among universities for human rights education and research
- Raised awareness about social discriminations based on age, marital status, and gender identity etc.
- Proposed and advocated for improvement of living conditions and practices in detention centers, correctional facilities and military facilities.

==== Korean Ten Important Corrections against Discrimination ====
The commission announced Korean Ten Important Corrections against Discrimination for Commemoration of 10th Anniversary of the National Human Rights Commission of Korea on the Human Rights Day, 10 December 2011 among complaints and suggestions for promoting human rights until 2011.

=== Human Rights Award of Korea ===
Since 2005, the Human Rights Award of Korea have been presented at the annual Human Rights Day.

=== Human rights films ===
Since 2002, the NHRCK has produced seven films on human rights issues, including discrimination against migrant workers, prejudice against minorities, in order to develop a human rights culture in Korean society. The films have been distributed to various educational institutions from elementary schools to universities and public libraries around the country.

Detailed information on films can be found at http://culture.humanrights.go.kr

Omnibus films

- If You Were Me (여섯개의 시선, 2003)
- If You Were Me 2 (다섯 개의 시선, 2006)
- If You Were Me 3 (세번째 시선, 2006)
- If You Were Me 4 (시선 1318, 2009)
- Fly Penguin (날아라 펭귄, 2009)
- If You Were Me 5 (시선 너머, 2011)

Animated films

- If You Were Me: Anima Vision (별별 이야기, 2005)
- If You Were Me: Anima Vision 2 (별별 이야기 2 - 여섯 빛깔 무지개, 2008)

== Commissioners and secretariat ==
The NHRCK consists of eleven commissioners: Chairperson, three standing commissioners, and seven non-standing commissioners. All commissioners are appointed based on their personal capacity for a term of three years and can be reappointed for another term of three years. Minimum number of four commissioners shall be women.

The Plenary Committee, the highest decision-making body, meets twice a month while Standing commissioners Committee meets once a week.

There are four thematic Sub-Committees which deal with

- human rights violations by the prosecutor's office, police, and military,
- human rights violations in detention, correctional, and group care centers, prisons, and military facilities,
- discrimination-related issues, and
- discrimination against persons with disabilities.

The Secretariat, headed by the Secretary-General, has 164 full-time staff with an annual budget of approximately 21 million US Dollars (2010). It has eleven thematic divisions under three bureaus and several units including counseling center, human rights library, and public information service.

Its headquarters is located in Seoul, capital of the Republic of Korea, and is supported by three regional offices in Busan, Gwangju, and Daegu. As a channel to promote cooperation with civil society, Policy Advisory Committee and Expert Committee have been established to seek policy advice and assistance from experienced human rights experts and defenders.

=== List of chairpersons ===
No.	Name	Took office	Left office
1	Kim Chang-guk	25 November 2001	24 December 2004
2	Choi Young-do	24 December 2004	22 March 2005
3	Cho Young-hwang	4 April 2005	1 October 2006
4	Ahn Kyong-whan	30 October 2006	5 July 2009
5-6	Hyun Byung-chul	17 July 2009	12 August 2015
7	Lee Sung-ho	13 August 2015	12 August 2018
8	Choi Young-ae	4 September 2018	3 September 2021
9	Song Doo-hwan	4 September 2021	3 September 2024
10	Ahn Chang-ho	6 September 2024	Incumbent

== Human rights-focused response to COVID-19 ==
Choi Young-ae, Chairperson of the National Human Rights Commission of Korea, stated that "COVID-19 is a test of [Korean] society's ability to protect human rights", emphasising the importance of obeying self-quarantine orders to main solidarity amongst Koreans. In the same statement she also suggested to err on the side of caution in the introduction of wristbands to track those in self-isolation. She stated that while the breaking of quarantine rules is still unacceptable, individuals should retain the freedom to choose not to be tracked with a wristband and have their personal data processed.

The NHRCK also criticised the national COVID-19 response after marginalised groups faced discrimination due to the pandemic and gaps in support for vulnerable people were made apparent.

LGBTI individuals were discriminated against following an outbreak in Itaewon, a nightlife district in Seoul home to a number of gay clubs. As a result, media reports made a number of unfounded claims that linked the outbreak to sexual orientation, in some cases doxing LGBTI individuals. This incident caused many in sexual minority groups to avoid getting tested for coronavirus for fear of their identity being 'outed'.

The NHRCK also noted a number of areas of inequality that had been brought to light by the pandemic. These included the gap in support for those with developmental disabilities in which many were unable to access facilities designed to provide support and in some cases were even unaware of assistive services available to them. Domestic violence and elder abuse had also risen due to the pandemic, as well as discrimination against non-citizens in the form of widespread mandatory COVID-19 tests for foreign workers.

== See also ==
- Human rights in South Korea
- Human rights in North Korea
- Human Rights Award of Korea
- Gender equality
- Gender inequality
