= Balada Shalawat =

Studio album by Gita Gutawa
- Released: 2010
- Genre: Religious
- Label: Sony Music Indonesia
- Producer: Erwin Gutawa

Balada Shalawat (Ballad of Salah) is an Islamic religious album released in 2010 by Gita Gutawa. It was arranged, orchestrated and produced by Erwin Gutawa and published by Sony Music Indonesia. Written as a way to "bring people to pray and praise Allah", the album included two new songs and six covers or rearrangements. The proceeds from album sales were to be donated to the poor.

== Writing ==
According to Erwin Gutawa, Balada Shalawat was written to bring Allah's word to the public through music, which the orchestral music serving to "bring people to pray and praise His greatness". He also said that it was made as a way to give back to the community after the commercial success of Gita's previous albums, Gita Gutawa and Harmoni Cinta.

== Production ==
Balada Shalawat was arranged, orchestrated, and produced by Erwin Gutawa, Gita Gutawa's father. It was recorded in Aluna Studio. Recording took one year, although it was not intensive.

Gita collaborated with her father in writing two songs, "Lelaki Sempurna" and "Kisah 8 Dirham". Other songs were covers or remakes. "Ketika Tangan dan Kaki Berkata" was originally released sung by Chrisye for Kala Cinta Menggoda and "Selamat Idul Fitri" had previously been sung in duet with Haddad Alwi for a concert.

The songs "Lelaki Sempurna" and "Kisah 8 Dirham" were both inspired by Muhammad. "Lelaki Sempurna" is based on Muhammad's personality, "truthful, trustworthy, smart, and diligent". "Kisah 8 Dirham tells of a trip made by Muhammad to a market, where he gladly donates all of his money to the poor and is thus unable to purchase new clothes. It was written after Gita heard Uztad Fikri's retelling of the story.

Prior to recording the Arabic-language "Balada Shalawat", Gita was coached by an Ustad, a respected teacher of Islam, in the proper pronunciation.

The song "Ketika Tangan dan Kaki Berkata" was based on the Islamic view of the Last Judgment and verse 65 of Surah Ya Sin, which reads:

"Today we shall seal the mouths of the infidels, and their hands will speak to us, and their feet will bear witness to what (evils) they used to earn."

Two different orchestras provided music. The Prague Philharmonic Orchestra played on "Balada Shalawat", "Ketika Tangan dan Kaki Berkata", and "Selamat Idul Fitri". The Victorian Philharmonic Orchestra provided music for "Salam Ramadhan".

== Track listing ==
No.	Title	Lyrics	Music	Length
1.	"Lelaki Sempurna" ("The Perfect Man")	Erwin Gutawa and Gita Gutawa (idea by Triawan KH)	Erwin Gutawa and Gita Gutawa	4:14
2.	"Balada Shalawat" ("Ballad for Salah")			4:43
3.	"Kisah 8 Dirham" ("Story of 8 Dirhams")	Erwin Gutawa and Gita Gutawa (idea by Uztad Fikri)	Erwin Gutawa and Gita Gutawa	3:23
4.	"Ketika Tangan dan Kaki Berkata" ("When Hands and Feet Speak")	Taufiq Ismail	Chrisye	4:50
5.	"Idul Fitri" ("Eid ul-Fitr")	N.N	N.N.	3:38
6.	"Jalan Lurus" ("The Straight Road")	Taufiq Ismail	N.N and Opiek	5:49
7.	"Surga di Telapak Kakimu" ("Heaven at the Soles of Your Feet")	Doni Sibarani and Gita Gutawa	Budi Rahardjo	4:45
8.	"Salam Ramadhan" ("Ramadhan Greetings")	Taufiq Ismail	Idru Al-Hanbay and Andi Risno	3:52

== Styles ==
"Ketika Tangan dan Kaki Berkata" is accompanied by orchestral music that, together with Gita's soprano voice, "emphasises [its] depth of meaning". "Balada Shalawat" is accompanied by more classical music.

== Release and reception ==
Balada Shalawat was released in August 2010, during Ramadhan, with all profits from the sales to be donated to the destitute. "Lelaki Sempurna" and "Kisah 8 Dirham" were released as singles.

A music video was produced for "Balada Shalawat", with a Ramadhan theme. It was directed by Rizal Montavani and shot in Kota Tua, Jakarta.

== Notes ==
1. Original: "... semoga kemegahan orkestra bisa mengantarkan orang untuk bersalawat memuji kebesaran-Nya".
2. Original: "... jujur, dapat dipercaya, cerdas dan rajin".
3. Live version, from the Kotak Musik Gita Gutawa Concert
4. Original: "... membuat lagu ini terasa dalam maknanya".
