= Harmoni Cinta =

Studio album by Gita Gutawa
- Released: 2009
- Recorded: June 2008 – March 2009
- Genre: Pop
- Label: Sony Music Indonesia
- Producer: Erwin Gutawa

Singles from Harmoni Cinta
- 1. "Aku Cinta Dia" Released: March 2009; 2. "Parasit" Released: April 2009; 3. "Meraih Mimpi" Released: August 2009; 4. "Mau Tapi Malu" Released: October 2009; 5. "Harmoni Cinta" Released: January 2010; 6. "Selamat Datang Cinta" Released: March 2010; 7. "Ayo (Come On)" Released: January 2013

Harmoni Cinta (Love's Harmony) is an album by Gita Gutawa. It was released in 2009 by Sony Music Indonesia, with a part of the sales used to send poor students to school. Produced over a period of nine months, it was a collaboration between Gutawa and numerous Indonesian musicians, including her father Erwin, Melly Goeslaw, and Glenn Fredly.

== Production ==
Production of Harmoni Cinta required nine months, from June 2008 to March 2009. It involved numerous Indonesian musicians, including Gita Gutawa's father Erwin, as well Glenn Fredly, Yovie Widyanto, and Melly Goeslaw. Singaporean songwriter Dick Lee also contributed the song "Remember", while "Aku Cinta Dia", a cover of the title song of Chrisye's album Aku Cinta Dia, was also included.

The vocals were recorded in Aluna Studio, Jakarta and the City of Prague Philharmonic Orchestra and Sofia Symphonic Orchestra recorded their pieces in their respective cities. Six of the songs were mixed at 301 Studio in Sydney, while the remaining six were mixed at Aluna Studio; "Aku Cinta Dia" was later mastered at Sterling Sound Mastering in New York. As such, work on the album took place on four different continents: Asia, Europe, Oceania, and North America.

Gita Gutawa played a greater role in the recording of Harmoni Cinta then her self-titled debut album. She assisted in deciding the concepts behind the album, choosing the songs included, and writing five of them.

== Styles ==
Gita Gutawa described the album as combining light, enjoyable, teen pop with orchestrated classic pop. She stated that, similar to her debut album Gita Gutawa, Harmoni Cinta dealt with themes of young love, friendship, family ties, and worldliness.

"Parasit" tells of the puppy love between two pre-teens, using terms indicative of biology, physics, and geography, and had references to the Sahara Desert, Antarctica, and outer space. The following love song, "Harmoni Cinta", has "extravagant" orchestral backing, while "Mau Tapi Malu" has Gita singing "coquettishly" with Mey Chan and Maia Estianty. "Remember" featured English and Indonesian-language lyrics with traditional instruments. Meanwhile, "Selamat Datang Cinta", "Meraih Mimpi", "Lullaby" and "When You Wish Upon a Star" are slower and more minimalistic.

== Release and reception ==
Harmoni Cinta was released on 8 May 2009 and targeted at 8- to 18-year-olds. The release gala was themed "Save a Teen with Harmony" because Gutawa had just been chosen as a youth ambassador for the education-oriented Sampoerna Foundation; a percentage of the sales were to be donated to the foundation, with every 20 albums sold raising enough to send one person to school. The song "Meraih Mimpi" was used as the theme song for the Indonesian adaptation of Sing to the Dawn, released in 2009.

Nobby of KapanLagi.com noted that Harmoni Cinta left a very similar impression to Gutawa's debut album, writing that it was even more "mature and honed."

== Track list ==
No.	Title	Lyrics	Music	Length
1.	"Parasit" ("Parasite")	Gita Gutawa	Erwin Gutawa	4:26
2.	"Harmoni Cinta" ("Love's Harmony")	Melly Goeslaw	Melly Goeslaw	3:53
3.	"Selamat Datang Cinta" ("Welcome Love")	Glenn Fredly	Glenn Fredly	4:33
4.	"Mau Tapi Malu" ("Want It, But Shy")	Maia Estianty	Maia Estianty	4:57
5.	"Meraih Mimpi" ("Chasing Dreams")	Alicia Pan, Terry Tyelee, & Adrian Yuen, adapted by Cindy Bernadette	Alicia Pan, Terry Tyelee, & Adrian Yuen	2:28
6.	"When You Wish Upon a Star"	Leigh Harline and Ned Washington	Leigh Harline and Ned Washington	3:26
7.	"Salah Jatuh Cinta" ("Wrong to Fall in Love")	Dewiq and Gita Gutawa	Dewiq and Gita Gutawa	3:38
8.	"Remember"	Dick Lee, with Gita Gutawa on chorus	Dick Lee	5:21
9.	"Ayo (Come On)"	Gita Gutawa	Gita Gutawa	3:52
10.	"Melangkah Lagi" ("Take Another Step")	Eross and Gita Gutawa	Yovi Widyanto	4:20
11.	"Aku Cinta Dia" ("I Love Him")	Adjie Soetama	Adjie Soetama	3:55
12.	"Lullaby"	Erwin, Lulu, and Gita Gutawa	Erwin, Lulu, and Gita Gutawa	3:27

== Notes ==
1. Together with Duo Maia
2. Based on "Sing to the Dawn", published by Me & Mrs Mom Pte. Limited.
3. Original: ... mewah ..."
4. Original: ... centil ..."
5. Original: ... matang dan terasah."
