= Gita Gutawa =

Indonesian singer (born 1993)

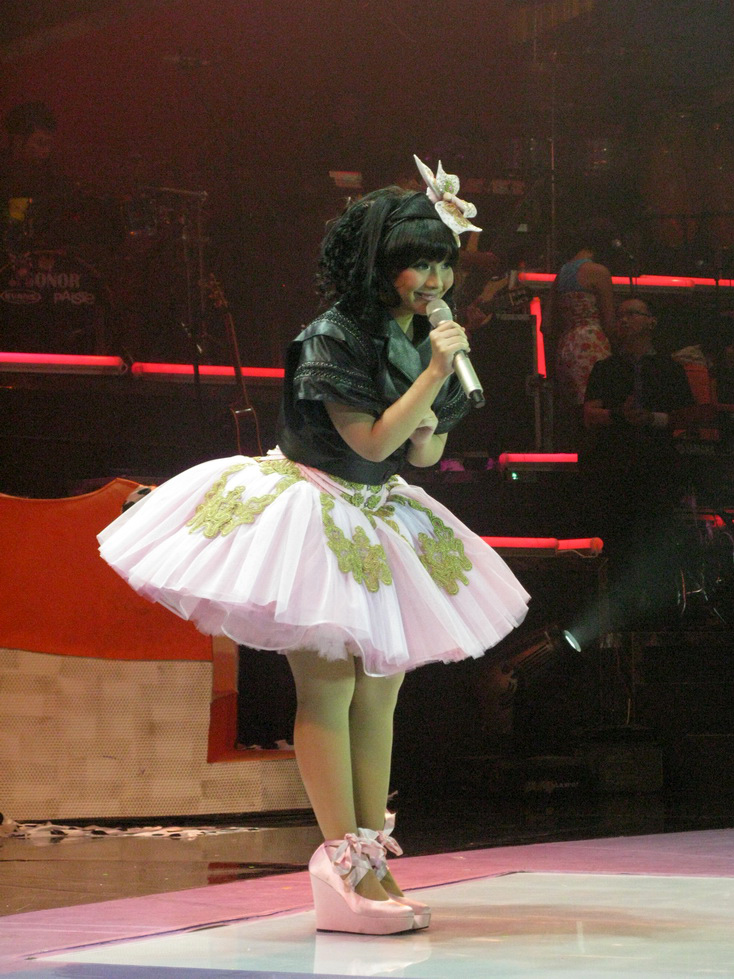
- Gutawa in the Kotak Musik Gita Gutawa concert, 2008 (Age 14/15)

Background information
- Born: Aluna Sagita Gutawa; 11 August 1990 (age 36); Jakarta, Indonesia
- Occupation: Singer
- Years active: 2004–present
- Label: Sony Music Indonesia
- Website: gitagutawa.com

Aluna Sagita Gutawa (born 11 August 1990), better known as Gita Gutawa, is an Indonesian singer. She is also the daughter of composer Erwin Gutawa.

Although she originally studied piano, Gita Gutawa later switched to vocals. She was discovered in 2004 while practising her vocals and then booked to sing a duet with ADA Band. After Heaven of Love (2005), featuring the duet, sold 800,000 copies, Gutawa was approached by Sony Music Indonesia with an offer to record a solo album. The success of that album, the self-titled Gita Gutawa, led to numerous acting and marketing job offers. Since her debut, she has recorded two more albums, the well-received Harmoni Cinta in 2009 and the Islamic-themed Balada Shalawat in 2010. As an actress, she has starred in two Indonesian soap operas, Ajari Aku Cinta and Ajari Lagi Aku Cinta. She voiced a character for the animated Meraih Mimpi, and made her feature film debut in 2010's Love in Perth.

Personality-wise, Dian Kuswandini of The Jakarta Post has described Gutawa as being "sweet like cotton candy and warm like a kiss"; however, Gita Gutawa has noted that there are people who believe she succeeded through nepotism. Gutawa has received several awards, including Best Newcomer at the 2008 Anugerah Musik Indonesia. She also won the 6th International Nile Children Song Festival in Cairo.

== Biography ==
=== Early life ===
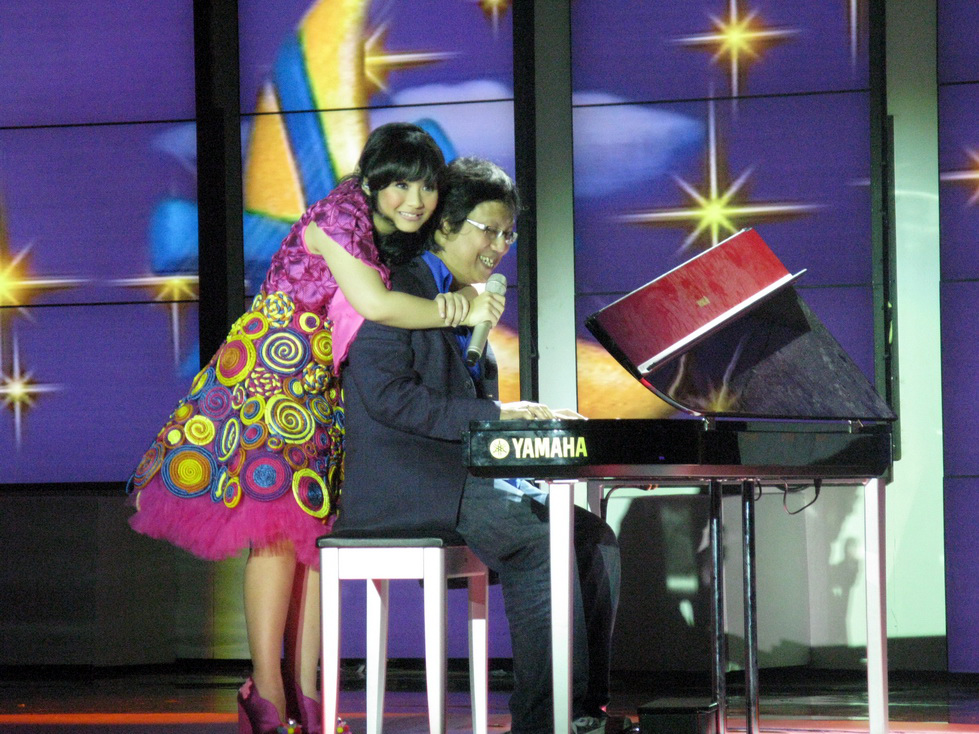
Gita Gutawa with her father Erwin, 2008

Gutawa was born Aluna Sagita Gutawa – Aluna Sagita meaning "song rhythm" – in Jakarta, Indonesia on 11 August 1993 to Erwin Gutawa, a composer, and Luthfi Andriani. The first child of the couple, she enjoyed watching her father work on his compositions. As a result, he enrolled her in a classical piano course, later sending her to a vocal course to develop her soprano voice. She received full support from her father, who assisted her as an adviser. In Chrisye's 2003 Dekade Concert, Gutawa performed in public for the first time, after Chrisye – who often collaborated with her father – invited her on stage. She later described him as her idol.

=== Music career ===
In 2004 Gutawa was approached by the manager of ADA Band, who had heard her practising at her singing lessons from the band's studio next door. She was asked to sing a duet with the band's lead singer; Gutawa, although at the time only singing as a hobby, accepted. The duet, titled "Yang Terbaik Bagimu" ("The Best for You"), was included on ADA Band's 2005 album Heaven of Love, which sold 800,000 copies. After singing other duets with different singers, including religious singer Haddad Alwi, Gutawa was asked to record a solo album by Sony Music Indonesia.

After a year in production, Gutawa's self-titled debut album was released in February 2007. The album was produced by her father and featured songs written by Glenn Fredly and Melly Goeslaw. Well-received, Gita Gutawa sold 150,000 copies in four months and was eventually certified triple platinum. After the success of the album, Gutawa's previously school-oriented schedule was filled with requests for media appearances and sponsorships. This led to Gutawa's mother stepping in and serving as her manager, in which role she continued until she became pregnant. Other members of Gutawa's family then assisted in managing her, with her mother scheduling Gutawa's media appearances and recording sessions.

Gutawa soon began singing in music festivals to gain experience. In 2008, she won the 6th International Nile Children Song Festival in Cairo with Ria Leimena's "To Be One", which she had previously sung on her debut album. That same year she attended a song festival in Italy. She later assembled a girl band to support her after several performances had to be cancelled due to an inability to find musicians at short notice.

After her return from Italy, Gutawa began production of her second album, Harmoni Cinta (Love's Harmony), in June 2008. She played a larger role in its production than in her debut album, choosing the concepts behind the album as well as the track listing; she eventually wrote five of the album's twelve songs. The album was released in May 2009. selling well. In August of that year, she released her biography, Kota Musik Gita Gutawa (Gita Gutawa's Music Box).

Gutawa followed Harmony Cinta in August 2010 with a third album, the Islamic religious album Balada Shalawat (Ballads for Salah). During recording, Gutawa received coaching from an Islamic scholar, or ustad, regarding the correct pronunciation of Arabic lyrics used in some songs. The album was launched during Ramadhan, with profits donated to Indonesia's poor.

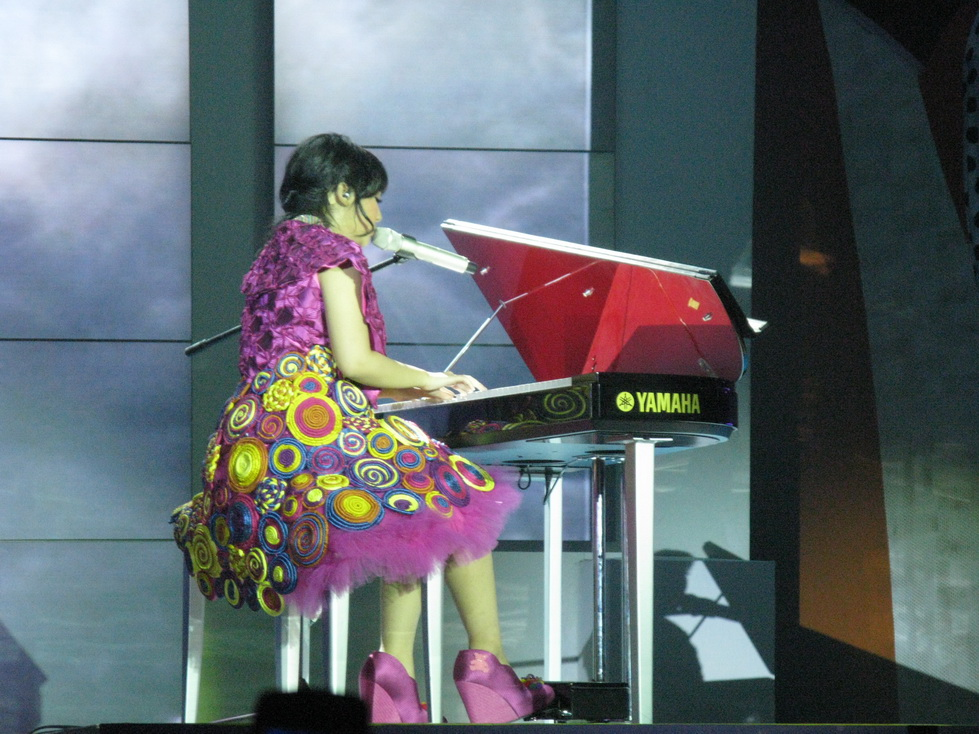
Gutawa playing the piano in the Kotak Musik Gita Gutawa concert, 2008

Gutawa has expressed concern that the public sees her rise to fame as being dependent on her already-famous father; she has stated in an interview with The Jakarta Post that she learned that "nepotism wouldn't work in the music industry". As such, Gutawa has attempted to emphasise that her duet with ADA Band and contract with Sony Music was won entirely on her own merits, with the band's manager not knowing that she was Erwin Gutawa's daughter when he approached her. She also cites the "negative sentiments against [her] sudden popularity" as pushing her to do her best.

In 2011, Gutawa announced that she would be retiring from music to study abroad. As a farewell celebration, her father held the concert "A Masterpiece of Erwin Gutawa" in Jakarta. She announced that she planned to take a degree in economics. On 5 April 2012, during a visit to Indonesia from her university in England, she performed Chrisye's song "Baju Pengantin" ("Wedding Dress") in the Kidung Abadi Chrisye concert at Plenary Hall, Jakarta Convention Center. She and her father also wrote a new song for the concert, entitled "Kidung Abadi" ("Eternal Ballad"), which was made by stringing together 246 syllables in Chrisye's voice.

=== Acting career ===
After the success of Gita Gutawa, Gutawa performed in numerous television commercials. She later received an offer to act in an upcoming sinetron (Indonesian soap opera) entitled Ajari Aku Cinta (Teach Me About Love), which used her song "Bukan Permainan" ("Not a Toy") as its theme. Gutawa accepted the offer, viewing it as a mainly promotional role. She later starred in its sequel, Ajari Lagi Aku Cinta (Teach Me More About Love).

In 2009, Gutawa voiced a character in Meraih Mimpi (Chasing Dreams), the Indonesian adaptation of Sing to the Dawn; the voice recording took four months. She later cited it as a good learning experience. The following year, she appeared in her first feature-length film, Love in Perth, in which she played a shy student studying in Perth, Australia. She considered it challenging; for the most difficult part, a scene in which she had to cry, she practised in front of a mirror. In May 2011 she began dating her Love in Perth costar Derby Romero; the couple split up sometime before January 2012.

== Education ==
While in elementary school and junior high school, she was chosen as the best student for five consecutive years. After becoming famous, she continued to attend Al-Izhar Junior High School instead of being home schooled like most Indonesian child stars because she felt that "attending a normal school is more fascinating," with more friends and chances to socialise. She later attended Bina Nusantara Senior High School. In 2009, Gutawa was chosen by the education-oriented Sampoerna Foundation – run by the investment company Sampoerna Strategic – as its first youth ambassador, taking a direct part in the company's initiatives. As one of her first acts, she promised that part of the sales of Harmoni Cinta would be used to send poor Indonesian children to school; every twenty albums sold would be enough for one child.

- 1996–1999 : TK Bakti Mulya, Jakarta
- 1999–2005 : SD Bakti Mulya, Jakarta
- 2005–2008 : SMP Al-Izhar Pondok Labu, Jakarta
- 2008–2011 : SMA Bina Nusantara Simprug, Jakarta
- 2011–2014: University of Birmingham, UK
- 2014–2015 : London School of Economics and Political Science, UK

== Styles ==
In a 2011 interview with the Jakarta Globe, Gutawa said that she continues to treat singing as a hobby despite it being her career.

== Songwriting ==
Gutawa often draws her inspiration from her own experiences, as well as those of her friends. When she receives inspiration, she will write the lyrics down and work out a melody immediately.

== Awards and recognition ==
Gutawa's debut album was well received by both the Indonesian public and critics, being certified triple platinum and winning four national awards; the 2007 SCTV award for Best Singer, as well as Best Album from SCTV and Best Newcomer and Best Album from Anugerah Musik Indonesia in 2008. Juliani Harsianti of The Jakarta Post describes Gutawa as having a "clear voice and fresh style" on the album.

== Discography ==
- 2007: Gita Gutawa
- 2009: Harmoni Cinta (Love's Harmony)
- 2010: Balada Shalawat (Ballads for Salah)
- 2014: The Next Chapter
- 2018: Gita Puja Indonesia

== Filmography ==
- Ajari Aku Cinta (Teach Me about Love)
- Ajari Lagi Aku Cinta (Teach Me More about Love)
- Meraih Mimpi (Chasing Dreams, based on Sing to the Dawn)
- Love in Perth
