= Sing to the Dawn (2008 film) =

- Directed by: Philip Mitchell
- Produced by: Mike Wiluan; Phil Mitchell; Phillip Stamp; Chan Pui Yin; Nia Dinata
- Starring: Celine Rosa Tan; Lim Kay Siu; Andrew Lua; Neo Swee Lin; Jason Chan; Denise Tan; Jamie Meldrum
- Edited by: Phil Mitchell
- Music by: Tze Chin Toh; Aghi Narottama; Bemby Gusti; Ramondo Gascaro
- Production companies: Infinite Frameworks Studios; Mediacorp Raintree Pictures; Media Development Authority; Scorpio East Pictures
- Distributed by: Golden Village Entertainment; Mediacorp Raintree Pictures; Kalyana Shira Film; Indika Pictures
- Release dates: 30 October 2008 (Singapore); 16 September 2009 (Indonesia)
- Running time: 93 minutes
- Countries: Singapore; Indonesia
- Languages: English; Indonesian
- Budget: $5 million

Sing to the Dawn is a 2008 Singaporean animated musical drama film. The film was produced by Infinite Frameworks, a Batam-based animation studio, Mediacorp Raintree Pictures, Media Development Authority and Scorpio East Pictures. It is loosely adapted from the short story by Minfong Ho that was first published in 1975.

The film was released on 30 October 2008 in Singapore, and later in Korea, Malaysia and Russia. It has screened at Pusan International Film Festival in South Korea and Santa Monica, USA.

An Indonesian dub of the film, named Meraih Mimpi (Dream On), was released on 16 September 2009.

== Synopsis ==
Dawan is a teenage girl who lives with her brother, father and grandmother in a small village in Batam.

Pairot is an entrepreneur and cruel landlord who is visually styled after Elvis Presley. Pairot extorts the villagers with an oppressive land tax. He claims to own the entire land of the village, and tells the villagers that he has a document from King Ramelan, the former ruler of the village. The village is unaware that Pairot is planning to evict the villagers and destroy the village to build a city with hotels and casinos.

After learning about Pairot's evil plans, Dana, with the help of her sister, struggle to save her beloved village. With help from Grandfather Wiwien, Dana tries to find the King's original will.

As a woman, Dawan's life is filled with difficulties and sadness. Dana is forced by her father to follow the village's patriarchal tradition. Her father has wanted to marry her off to Pairot's son, Benz.

Dawan and Kai are assisted by a group of jungle animals who can talk to each other, including bird parrots named Kakatu, crow named Minah, lizards, and bear named Tante Bear.

Accompanied by their animal friends, Dawan and Kai win scholarships and thwart the landlord's plan.

== Voice cast ==
Character	Voiced by English	Voiced by Indonesian	Information
Dawan/Dana	Celina Rosa Tan	Gita Gutawa	Protagonist who is a dreamer, but smart and brave fighter
Kai/Rai	Andrew Lua	Patton Otlivio Latupeirissa	Dana's brother
Grandmother/Oma	Neo Swee Lin	Jajang C. Noer	Dana's grandmother
Somchai/Somad	Lim Kay Siu	Uli Herdinansyah	Dana's father, an inventor
Pairote/Pairot	Jason Chan	Surya Saputra	Antagonist, an evil landlord and entrepreneur
Bens/Ben		Indra Bekti	Pairot's son
Wichien/Wiwien	Jamie Meldrum	Jose Rizal Manua	A crazy old man but a lot of knowledge
Cockatoo/Kakatu	Denise Tan	Cut Mini	Bird parrots chatty kind (accented Malay in the Indonesian version)
Minah		Shanty	Bird crow Kakatu friend
Kadal		Ria Irawan	A lizard (accented Tegal in the Indonesian version)
Tante Bear		Tike Priatnakusumah	Bear leader

- Director Joko Anwar appeared as guest star and contributed his voice in the film as Ubay.
- Bemby Gusti is a musician who contributed the voice of Spider.

== Production ==
Sing to the Dawn was co-produced by MediaCorp Raintree Pictures, Singapore's Media Development Authority and Infinite Frameworks (IFW), an animation studio based in Batam, Indonesia. The film was an adaptation of a short story by Minfong Ho at the request of the Singapore government.

Production was done in Batam over three years with a budget of US$5 million. The film was referred to as "the film work of the nation" by IFW, because out of the 150 animators in the studio, almost all were Indonesian except for five expatriates. The total number of expatriates involved is only 10. Many animators from Yogyakarta, London, and Solo were recruited for the production of this film.

Sing to the Dawn was the second 3D animated film produced in Indonesia after Homeland (2004).

After the English version of the film was completed in 2008, it was distributed to various countries.

Localisation of Sing to the Dawn to an Indonesian version was completed in 2009 under the title Meraih Mimpi (Dream On). Nia Dinata was hired to assist in the localization of the film. Erwin Gutawa, the film's composer, wrote new music for the film. In addition to language, the story was overhauled. In releasing this film, Kalyana Shira Films worked with IFW and collaborated with Mediacorp Raintree Pictures, Scorpio East Pictures, Indika Pictures and Singapore's Media Development Authority.

== Comparison to the book ==
Besides changing the names of the characters, the setting moved from a small Thai village to Batam.

In the book, Pairot never dressed up like Elvis. The conflicts experienced by the villagers in the book center around women's traditional gender roles in Southeast Asia. In the film, the story centered on Pairot's plans to evict the villagers. The plot in the film has less conflict between Dana and her father who told her sister that he did not believe that women need education. This scene was not developed in the film.

== Release ==
The English-language version of the film was released on 30 October 2008 in Singapore, followed by Korea, Malaysia and Russia. The film was screened at Pusan International Film Festival in South Korea and in Santa Monica.

Sing to the Dawn was not immediately released in Indonesia because IFW wanted to introduce the film to an international audience first.

Meraih Mimpi (Dream On) was released in Indonesia on 16 September 2009 by Kalyana Shira Films.

== Reception ==
According to Jakarta Globe, Dream On was filled with exciting adventures and was well-suited for young children.

In the premiere of Sing to the Dawn at Jurong Bird Park, Singapore, Ho found the movie to be very different from the book and that they are not to be compared with each other. According to Ho, the film successfully demonstrated the character and spirit of Dawan. Ho said that if she were to rate the film, she would give it 11 out of 10.
