= Love in Perth =

- Directed by: Findo Purwono HW
- Written by: Titin Watimena
- Produced by: Dhamoo Punjabi; Manoj Punjabi
- Starring: Gita Gutawa; Iqbal Aji Daryono; Petra Sihombing; Michella Putri
- Production company: MD Pictures
- Distributed by: MD Entertainment
- Release date: 30 December 2010
- Running time: 90 minutes
- Country: Indonesia
- Language: Indonesian

Love in Perth is a 2010 Indonesian film. Starring Gita Gutawa, Iqbal Aji Daryono, Petra Sihombing, and Michella Putri, it tells the story of Lola, an Indonesian student studying in Perth, Western Australia, who falls in love with another Indonesian student, Dhani.

== Plot ==
Lola (Gita Gutawa), a shy 16-year-old Indonesian girl, receives a scholarship to study at a famous high school in Perth. At first, she gets a rude welcome from her westernised roommate Tiwi (Michella Putri); Tiwi later comes to hate her. Lola also meets two fellow students, the friendly and helpful Ari (Petra Sihombing) and the aloof Dhani (Derby Romero).

Although at first they fight incessantly, Lola becomes increasingly intrigued by and close to Dhani, eventually falling in love with him. Dhani, however, uses her for his own pleasure. As she pushes Dhani away, Ari falls in love with her. As Lola and Ari become increasingly close, Dhani becomes jealous and attempts to ruin their relationship. Eventually Lola becomes disheartened and decides to leave Perth, causing Dhani to attempt to woo her back. When Dhani realises that she is not leaving he is overjoyed.

== Production ==
Love in Perth was produced by MD Pictures, as represented by Dhamoo and Manoj Punjabi. After the script was refused several times by directors who said that it was too difficult. Eventually, after script changes Findo Purwono HW agreed to direct.

Gita Gutawa, a teenage singer, was cast in the leading role of Lola. Gutawa, who had previously voiced a character in Meraih Mimpi (Chasing Dreams, an Indonesian remake of Sing to the Dawn), said that the character fit her well. However, she noted that it was a challenge, saying that she had to practice extensively in front of a mirror for a scene in which she had to cry. It was her first feature film role. The leading male role of Dhani went to Derby Romero, who had previously starred in Petualangan Sherina (Sherina's Adventure) as a child and was well known as a singer. Gutawa, Romero, and fellow cast member Sihombing provided songs for the soundtrack.

Love in Perth was shot mainly in Perth.

== Release and reception ==
Love in Perth premiered on 28 December 2010 at Ex Plaza in Jakarta. Among those in attendance was Gutawa's father Erwin, who took time from a concert he was directing to watch the premiere. It attained a wider release on 30 December.

Puput Puji Lestari, of KapanLagi.com, wrote that Gutawa's character, though personality-wise not much different from the actress and her first major role, came across like "a breath of fresh air" and dominated the screen. She also praised the soundtrack. (Note: Original: "... membawa angin segar.")

A reviewer for 21 Cineplex wrote that Gutawa, Romero, and Sihombing played their roles well. Purwono's choice of Perth was praised, as the reviewer felt that the city's beauty had been shown well. The reviewer also noted a positive moral message, that teens could fall in love without having to resort to premarital sex.
