= NEXT Property Group =

Real-estate developer based in Georgia

NEXT Property
- Type: Private
- Industry: Real estate development and investment
- Founded: 2018
- Founder: Kakha Devadze
- Headquarters: Batumi, Géorgie
- Area served: Europe, Asia, and Africa (countries: Georgia, Spain, United Arab Emirates, Kenya, Zanzibar)
- Number of employees: 1,000+
- Website: next-property.com

NEXT Property is a privately owned real estate development company based in Batumi, Georgia. The company specializes in branded residences, luxury villas, and mixed-use communities in various international markets.

NEXT Property has a portfolio with active developments in four main regions: Georgia, its home market; Spain; the United Arab Emirates; and Kenya.

== Overview ==
NEXT Property was founded in 2018 in Batumi, Georgia. In 2018, the company began construction on the NEXT Green. In 2020, it introduced NEXT Apartments.

In 2021, the company partnered with Wyndham Hotels & Resorts to develop branded residences.

In 2022, NEXT Property started developing Radisson Blu Residences and Villa Park. In 2023, the company launched NEXT Collection in Batumi and NEXT Address, a large mixed-use development. The company has received multiple awards, including the Titan Awards, World Travel Awards, Luxury Property Awards, International Business Magazine, and African Property Awards.

In 2024, the company expanded internationally by launching NEXT Amani in Kenya's Tatu City, entering the Dubai Islands market with NEXT Coral on Dubai Islands, NEXT Gardens in Kvariati, and starting NEXT Gardens.

In early 2025, NEXT Property launched Tbilisi Downtown in Georgia's capital. In the same year, the company also introduced a new project in Tbilisi—Tbilisi Oriental, a 21-story mixed-use development in the Ortachala district on the Mtkvari River, designed in a high-tech architecture style with exposed concrete, iron elements, and glass. In 2025, NEXT Property initiated a project in Zanzibar in partnership with the creative branding agency Brash.

== Operations ==
NEXT Property specializes in premium branded residential developments, luxury hospitality properties, and mixed-use communities that integrate residential, retail, and lifestyle services into comprehensive urban living environments.

The company operates across five key international markets: Georgia (Batumi and Tbilisi), the United Arab Emirates (Dubai), Spain (Marbella), and Kenya (Tatu City), positioning itself to serve a global clientele seeking luxury investments and premium lifestyle destinations.
