= Kidung Abadi =

Song by Erwin and Gita Gutawa

Song by Chrisye
- Language: Indonesian
- Released: 2018
- Recorded: Early 2012
- Length: 4:35
- Label: Musica Studios
- Composer(s): Erwin Gutawa
- Lyricist(s): Gita Gutawa

"Kidung Abadi" (Indonesian for "Eternal Ballad") is a song written by father and daughter team Erwin and Gita Gutawa for the Kidung Abadi Chrisye concert; the concert was held on 5 April 2012 to commemorate the fifth anniversary of Chrisye's death. The song was created over a period of three months by splicing syllables from previously recorded vocals by Chrisye. At the concert, spliced black-and-white footage of Chrisye was shown lip synching to the song while Erwin's orchestra performed the music. The song was well received: the audience gave it a rowdy ovation, while critics praised its lyrics and described it as one of the best parts of the concert.

== Background ==
Chrisye had a forty-year career in Indonesia's music industry, starting as a bassist with Sabda Nada before his first stint as a vocalist on the indie album Guruh Gipsy (1976). After the success of the song "Lilin-Lilin Kecil" ("Small Candles"; 1977) and album Badai Pasti Berlalu (The Storm Shall Surely Pass; 1977), he began a solo career with Musica Studios. Before his death of lung cancer on 30 March 2007, he released nineteen albums with Musica. In 2011 Rolling Stone Indonesia listed Chrisye as the third-greatest Indonesian musician of all time.

Towards the fifth anniversary of Chrisye's death, Chrisye's widow Yanti Noor, director Jay Subiyakto, and composer Erwin Gutawa began collaborating for a concert; the concert was announced on 29 February 2012 and marketed as Chrisye's fourth concert. It was held on 5 April 2012 at Plenary Hall in the Jakarta Convention Centre and featured a hologram of Chrisye singing with Once Mekel, Vina Panduwinata, Sophia Latjuba, and the band Gigi. Another feature of the concert was "Kidung Abadi" ("Eternal Ballad").

== Composition and performance ==
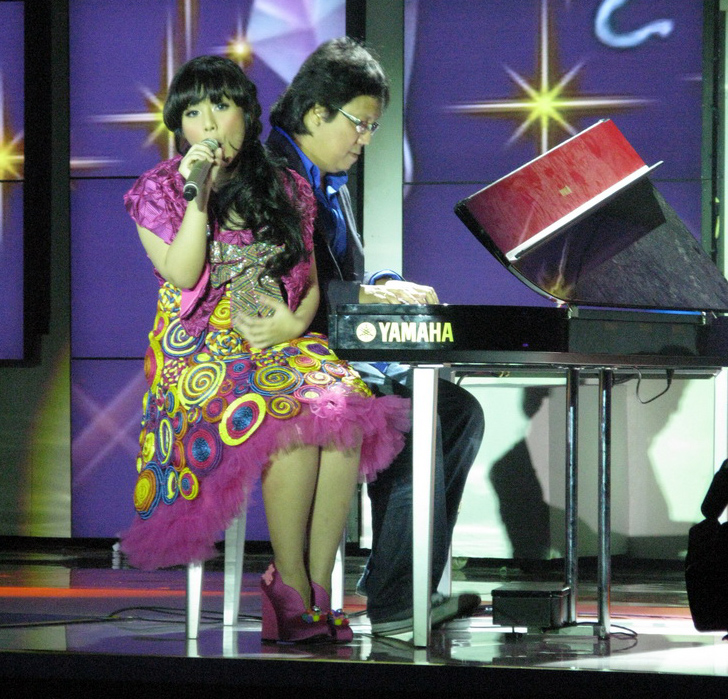
"Kidung Abadi" was written by father/daughter team Erwin and Gita Gutawa.

The song was composed by Erwin Gutawa, who had previously collaborated with Chrisye on five albums. In an interview with The Jakarta Post, he said that he felt guilty as he had never written anything for Chrisye in the time they had worked together; he had intended to make a new song with Chrisye's voice since soon after the latter's death. The lyrics were written by Gutawa's daughter, Gita, who was asked by her father to write as if Chrisye were singing about having died, but his songs living on. Gita, who also sang at the concert, felt she owed something to Chrisye as her first stage performance was at his 2003 Dekade concert.

To record the vocals, the elder Gutawa and a ten-member team of researchers compiled thousands of syllables from Chrisye's older songs, obtained from the masters, in a database. Some syllables were kept unaltered, while others were amalgamated to form a single sound or more than one; according to Kompas, the "ku" syllables in "Kidung Abadi" were an amalgamation of 1,056 "ku" syllables in Chrisye's previous songs. Ultimately, a total of 246 syllables were combined in Pro Tools to form the new song; the program was also used to change the pitch of numerous syllables. Gutawa inserted pauses where he assumed Chrisye would have paused if singing the song in real life; he based his choices on his previous experience with Chrisye. The entire process, from writing to recording, took three months.

The song was initially performed at the Kidung Abadi concert on as the penultimate song. It was overlaid on a black-and-white video of Chrisye singing projected on an 8-by-4-metre (26 by 13 ft) screen. The video was created by Jay Subiyakto, (Note: Subiyakto had previously worked on several of Chrisye's music videos.) who spliced together archived footage of Chrisye performing. Chrisye's lips were synchronised to move in time with the vocals. Subiyakto stated that he did not base the work on foreign shows, choosing instead to start from scratch. The music was provided by a live orchestra.

== Reception ==
Eko Sutriyanto, writing for Tribun, called the song one of the best parts of the concert, although he considered the synchronisation off. Frans Sartono wrote in Kompas that the song was "touching", quoting the lyrics "See the times pass, I'm here and you're there.... Though now I'm far from you, I'll keep singing. Hear my melody flow; this is for you" (Note: Original: "Lihatlah masa berganti semua, ku di sini dan kau di sana.... Walau kini kujauh darimu, ku kan selalu tetap bernyanyi. Kau dengar alunan melodiku, persembahan ini untukmu.") as reflecting Chrisye's unique style. The thousands-strong crowd gave the song a rowdy ovation after the performance.

== Releases ==
The song was not released on an album until 2018, on the LP compilation also called Kidung abadi, and in 2020 on the 3-LP set The Signature Collection.
