= Ritz-Carlton Paradise Valley =

Resort in Arizona

General information
- Location: 7000 East Lincoln Drive, Paradise Valley, AZ 85253, Paradise Valley, Arizona, United States
- Coordinates: 33.5342°N 111.9294°W

Design and construction
- Developer: Five Star Development

Ritz-Carlton Paradise Valley is a luxury resort and residential development under construction in Scottsdale, Arizona, developed by Five Star Development. The multi-phase project includes a Ritz-Carlton hotel, branded residences, and a mixed-use retail and hospitality development. The project is reported as a $2 billion development and spans more than 120 acres.

== History and development ==
The Ritz-Carlton Paradise Valley was announced as a luxury destination combining a full-service Ritz-Carlton resort with a collection of residences and a 29-acre commercial district. The resort broke ground in 2018.

Available plans describe resort features typical of Ritz-Carlton properties: restaurants and bars, spa and wellness facilities, pools, event and meeting spaces, and private villa amenities.

=== Controversy and Litigation ===
Beginning in 2024 and extending through 2025, a major public controversy centered on a dispute between Five Star Development and Madison Realty Capital, the project's lender. Madison Realty publicly moved to enforce remedies after alleged loan defaults, including filing notices that could lead to a foreclosure on the project. Five Star countered with litigation, accusing the lender of prioritizing certain parts of the development, such as the villas, over completion of the resort hotel. Five Star's complaint further alleged Madison Realty Group withheld required draws and took steps to accelerate foreclosure, actions the developer said diverted resources away from completing the resort and placed purchasers and contractors at risk.

Some villas, although complete and sold, became unoccupiable due to town certificates of occupancy being withheld during the hotel's development stall, supporting Five Star's claim that lender enforcement actions harmed third parties.

In August 2025, Madison Realty Capital scheduled a trustee sale, and Five Star reported that Madison Realty Capital had sought to seize control of the project assets. Five Star Development and certain affiliates filed Chapter 11 petitions in early November 2025, seeking court supervision to preserve the project and protect stakeholders.
