= Claire Chiang =

Singaporean politician, entrepreneur, and activist

- 张齐娥
- Born: 4 October 1951 (age 74)
- Spouse: Ho Kwon Ping

Claire Chiang See Ngoh (Note: Chinese: 张齐娥; Pe̍h-ūe-jī: Chiang Chhî-ngô; pinyin: Zhāng Qi'e) (born 4 October 1951) is a Singaporean entrepreneur, activist and former Nominated Member of Parliament. She is the co-founder of hospitality group Banyan Group and one of the first two women to be admitted to the Singapore Chinese Chamber of Commerce and Industry (SCCCI) in 1995. Chiang has advocated for issues on education and gender equality. She was inducted into the Singapore Women's Hall of Fame in 2018.

== Early life ==
Chiang grew up in a two-room flat in the Little India district with her parents and five elder brothers. Her father was an accountant while her mother did various odd jobs. Her primary education consisted of morning sessions at Nan Hua Primary School and afternoon sessions at Raffles Girls' Primary School. She attended Raffles Girls' School. She was a sociology major at the University of Singapore (now the National University of Singapore), and did a programme in translation at the Sorbonne University in Paris, before returning to complete her honours degree in Singapore, while working at the French Embassy.

== Career ==
=== Academia ===
Chiang and her husband, Ho Kwon Ping, relocated to Hong Kong in 1978, and she obtained a master's degree in sociology from the University of Hong Kong in 1985. Chiang worked as a research sociologist at the National University of Singapore in the early 1990s.

=== Business ===
In 1994, Chiang and Ho co-founded the first Banyan Tree resort in Phuket. The Banyan Group has since become an international hospitality brand with resorts, hotels, spas and residences in Asia, America, Africa and Middle East. Chiang was among the first women elected to the SCCCI's council. Chiang is currently senior vice-president of Banyan Tree Hotels & Resorts. In June 2022, Chiang was featured on the Global 100 in Hospitality by the International Hospitality Institute and was recognized as one of the 100 Most Powerful People in Global Hospitality.

=== Nominated Member of Parliament ===
Chiang was a Nominated Member of Parliament (NMP) from 1997 to 2001. As an NMP, she advocated for issues such as compulsory education, parental consent for teenage abortions, changes in the Children's Act and rights for domestic helpers.

=== Other organisations ===
Chiang was the chairperson of Wildlife Reserves Singapore from 2008 to 2015. She is the chairperson of the National Book Development Council of Singapore.

Chiang joined the Association of Women for Action and Research in 1988 and was elected president in 1993. She also served on the Diversity Action Committee which aims to encourage gender diversity in the boardrooms of local organisations. She became president of the Society Against Family Violence in 1995.
