= Holly Meade =

American writer (1956–2013)

- Born: September 14, 1956; Winchester, Massachusetts, U.S.
- Died: June 28, 2013 (aged 56)
- Education: Rhode Island School of Design (AB)
- Occupations: Writer; artist
- Children: 2

Holly Meade (b. Winchester, Massachusetts, September 14, 1956 - d. June 28, 2013) was an American artist best known for her woodblock prints and for her illustrations for children's picture books.

Meade's illustrations for Hush!: A Thai Lullaby (1996, Orchard Books,) by Minfong Ho won a 1997 Caldecott Honor for illustration.

John Willy and Freddy McGee (Marshall Cavendish, 1998,) which Meade both wrote and illustrated, was an honoree for the Charlotte Zolotow Award for Creative Writing.

== Biography ==
Meade was the daughter of Russell and Joanne Meade of Winchester, Massachusetts. She earned her A.B. from the Rhode Island School of Design in 1978. She lived in Sedgwick, Maine and had two children, Jenny and Noah Smick.

== Career ==
Meade worked in "drawing, collage, printmaking, basket making, and fabric design." In 1992, she illustrated her first of many children's picture books, an endeavor that she called "the other focus of my work life". She began to work in woodblock printing in 2002, following a workshop with printmaker Hester Stinnett at the Haystack Mountain School. Some of her prints are in the permanent collection of the Portland Museum of Art.

Woodblock prints illustrate some of her later picture books, including David Elliott’s series that includes On the Farm (Candlewick, 2008), In the Wild (2010) and In the Sea (2012).

=== Children's books ===
She used torn paper to illustrate the 1997 book Cocoa Ice, which was given a Lupine Award by the Maine Library Association. Meade describe the challenge of illustrating the parallel story with, "pictures where a tropical place and warm palette must go hand in hand with a bare landscape and cool palette."

Her book John Willy and Freddy McGee was a 1999 Charlotte Zolotow Award Honor Book.

== Selected bibliography ==
The follow is a selection of some of the works Meade published.

=== Author and Illustrator ===
- 2001 A Place to Sleep
- 2001 The Rabbit's Bride by the Brother's Grimm
- 2003 John Willy and Freddy McGee
- 2005 Inside, Inside, Inside
- 2011 If I Never Forever Endeavor

=== Illustrator ===
- 1992 This is the Hat by Nancy Van Laan
- 1994 Rata-Pata-Scata-Fata: A Caribbean Story by Phillis Gershator
- 1994 Small Green Snake by Libba Moore Gray
- 1995 Sleep, Sleep, Sleep by Nancy Van Laan
- 1996 Pie's in the Oven by Betty G. Birney
- 1996 Hush!: A Thai Lullaby by Minfong Ho
- 1997 Cocoa Ice by Diana Appelbaum
- 1998 Boss of the Plains by Laurie Carlson
- 2000 Steamboat! The Story of Captain Blanche Leathers by Judith Heide Gilliland
- 2000 When Papa Snores by Melinda Long
- 2002 On Morning Wings by Reeve Lindbergh
- 2004 Blue Bowl Down by C. M. Millen
- 2004 Peek!: A Thai Hide-and-Seek by Minfong Ho
- 2005 Hop! by Phyllis Root
- 2005 Quack! by Phyllis Root
- 2007 Sky Sweeper by Phillis Gershator
- 2007 Virginnie's Hat by Dori Chacaonas
- 2007 That's What Friends are For by Florence Parry Heide
- 2008 On the Farm by David Elliott
- 2009 And then Comes Halloween by Tom Brenner
- 2011 Naamah and the Ark at Night by Susan Campbell Bartoletti
- 2013 In the wild by David Elliot
- 2014 In the Sea by David Elliot
