= Hush!: A Thai Lullaby =

Children's book

- Author: Minfong Ho
- Illustrator: Holly Meade
- Publication date: 1996
- Awards: 1997 Caldecott Honor (illustration)

Hush!: A Thai Lullaby is a 1996 illustrated children's book by Minfong Ho, illustrated by Holly Meade. It won a 1997 Caldecott Honor for Meade's illustrations.

The book, as simple story in which a Thai mother putting her child to sleep asks the animals to hush, "Lizard, lizard,/ don't come peeping... ""White duck, white duck/ don't come beeping.... Can't you see that Baby's sleeping?" until all of the woodland creatures are sound asleep, as is the mother, while her child is still wide awake, became instantly popular as a bedtime story for very young children.
