= Li Lienfung =

Singaporean chemist and writer

Li Lienfung (1923 – 3 August 2011) 李廉凤 was a Singaporean chemist and writer. She was a bilingual writer, using both English and Chinese. Li was known for her plays, short stories and especially for her newspaper column, "Bamboo Green."

== Biography ==
Li was born in Shanghai in 1923. Her father, Li Kuo Ching, left to work in the United States, leaving Li's mother to raise her in China. He eventually abandoned his family when Li's mother would not move to the U.S. When China was invaded by Japan in 1937, she moved to Hunan, and then to Hong Kong.

She went to Mills College in 1940 and graduated with a degree in chemistry. She worked for a short time in an aluminum smelting plant in New Jersey as a lab assistant. She studied organic chemistry at the Massachusetts Institute of Technology (MIT), but transferred to Cornell University where she earned her master's degree in literature in 1946. At Cornell, her master's thesis was on Chinese folk literature.

In July 1946, she married Ho Rih Hwa, who was also a student at Cornell. She and her father also reconciled at this time. Her father sent her to Bangkok in 1948, where she became the chief chemist analyzing tungsten ores that her father exported, trading with the Wah Chang Group company. Her family then moved to Yangon in 1949. Later, Li helped her father set up tapioca factories and other food-related ventures.

Li's daughter, Ho Minfong, was born in Yangon in 1951. Minfong would go on to become a noted writer. Her son, Ho Kwon Ping, was born in Hong Kong in 1952 and later became a businessman. Li has another son, Kwon Cjan, who is also involved in business. In 1952, Li returned to work for the company, and was eventually made the vice-chair of Wah Chang.

Li's husband became Singapore's ambassador to Thailand in 1967. After Thailand, he was made the ambassador to several European countries and entities, meaning that Li lived in Europe until the early 1970s, when they moved to Singapore.

Li died on 3 August 2011 after going into a coma following a massive brain haemorrhage. She died in the National University Hospital. Li was inducted into the Singapore Women's Hall of Fame in 2014.

== Work ==
The Sword Has Two Edges had its origins in research she started in 1956 on the story of San Guo Shi Yan Yi. Li wrote the manuscript quickly and when she was asked to rewrite it as a comedy, she put it away, only to revisit the story in 1971. A member of the Experimental Theatre Group, D. Murugan, decided to produce the play in 1977. Her next play, Trials and Turbulence of the Twilight Years won a first place award in its category from the Ministry of Culture in 1978. In 1981, her play, The Late Storm was produced.

Li wrote a popular column in English and Chinese, called "Bamboo Green" which ran between 1979 and 1984 in The Straits Times. In 1986, a compilation of her columns, A Joss Stick for My Mother was released. Li revived the column in 1993, and continued to write it until 1998. The column educated Singaporeans on Chinese history, literature, life and culture. Li then started writing a Chinese column for the Lianhe Zaobao between 1998 and 2009.

Li published the Chinese version of her memoir, A Daughter Remembers, in 2010, with the English translation coming out after her death.
