= Banyan Group =

Singaporean multinational hospitality brand

Banyan Group Limited
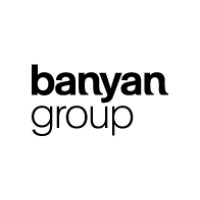
- Trade name: Banyan Group
- Type: Subsidiary
- Traded as: SGX: B58
- Industry: Hotels
- Founded: 1994
- Founder: Ho Kwon Ping, Claire Chiang, Ho Kwon Cjan
- Headquarters: Singapore
- Brands: Banyan Tree Hotel & Resorts, Angsana Hotels & Resorts, Laguna, Cassia, Dhawa, Folio, Garrya, Homm, Banyan Tree Escape, Banyan Tree Veya
- Number of employees: 12,000+
- Website: groupbanyan.com

Banyan Group Limited (formerly known as Banyan Tree Holdings) is a Singaporean multinational hospitality brand that was established in 1994. It manages and develops resorts, hotels and spas in Asia, Europe, North America, and Africa. The group comprises 12 global brands, including the flagship brand Banyan Tree. Currently, the Group operates more than 70 hotels and resorts, over 60 spas and galleries, and 14 branded residences in over 20 countries.

== History ==
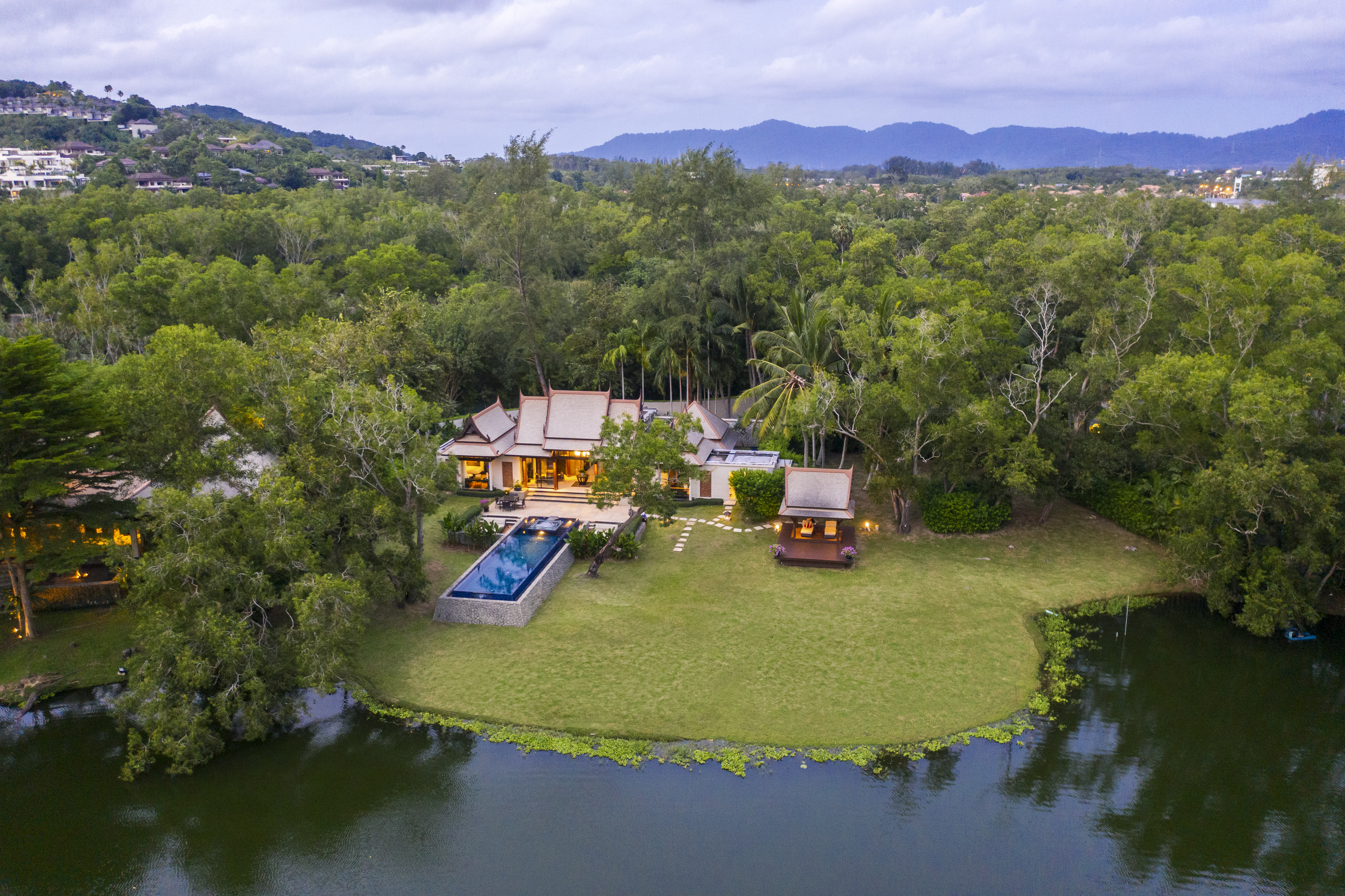
The first Banyan Tree location in Phuket, Thailand

Banyan Tree started when founder Ho Kwon Ping and his wife Claire Chiang came across a plot of land while they were on holiday in Bang Tao Bay, on the western coast of Phuket in the Andaman Sea. They purchased the land and embarked on a regeneration programme, reintroducing indigenous plants. Ten years later, in 1994, the first resort, Banyan Tree Phuket, was built.

In 2000, the sister brand (second brand in the group) Angsana Resorts & Spa was launched in June with the opening of Angsana Bintan.

In 2009, Banyan Tree Global Foundation was created as part of Banyan Group Limited. In December 2016, Banyan Tree entered into a partnership with a French hospitality company, Accor. As part of the deal, Accor would invest €16 million to Banyan Tree in exchange for a 5% stake in the company, with the option to purchase an additional 5% stake.

In 2015, the Banyan Group launched its 4th brand Cassia (besides Banyan Tree, Angsana, Laguna) in outposts like Bintan and Phuket which focused on extended stays with amenities like fully equipped kitchens. In October 2015, the Banyan Group launched its 5th brand Dhawa, and the First Dhawa opens in Cayo Santa Maria, Cuba, in December 2016.

On 26 November 2025, Banyan Group and Mandai Wildlife Group officially opened Mandai Rainforest Resort by Banyan Tree—Banyan’s 100th property and its first in Singapore—situated within the Mandai Wildlife Reserve as the first resort located inside a major wildlife and nature destination in the city. This is also Banyan Group's 100th property overall.

Scheduled to open in early 2026, Ubuyu will be Banyan Group’s first safari resort, located in Tanzania’s Ruaha National Park. The eco-luxury retreat will feature six artisan-crafted villas inspired by Maasai architecture, overlooking the Great Ruaha River and blending into the surrounding savannah where wildlife roams freely.

== Brands ==
As of July 2023, the company operates 70 resorts and hotels. Under its management are also 63 spas, 64 retail galleries, and three championship golf courses in 23 countries. Banyan Tree currently markets its properties under ten brands, including Banyan Tree, Angsana, Laguna, Cassia, Dhawa, Garrya, Homm, Banyan Tree Escape, Banyan Tree Veya, and Folio.

=== Notable Properties ===
- Banyan Tree Macau
- Banyan Tree Al Wadi

== See also ==
- Banyan
- Banyan Tree AlUla
