= Minfong Ho =

American writer (born 1951)

- Born: January 7, 1951 (age 75); Rangoon, Burma
- Education: Cornell University
- Occupation: Writer
- Relatives: Ho Kwon Ping (brother)
- Writing career
- Notable awards: Gold Star Story Award

Minfong Ho (born January 7, 1951) is a Singaporean–American writer. She received the Cultural Medallion, the highest arts accolade in Singapore, in 1997.

== Early life ==
Minfong Ho was born in Rangoon, Burma (now Yangon, Myanmar), to Ho Rih Hwa, a Singaporean economist, diplomat and businessman, and Li Lienfung, a Singaporean chemist and writer. Ho was raised in Thailand, near Bangkok, enrolled in Tunghai University in Taiwan and subsequently transferred to Cornell University in the United States, where she received her Bachelor's degree, and a Master's Degree.

It was at Cornell that she first began to write, as a way to combat homesickness. She submitted a short story, titled Sing to the Dawn, to the Council for Interracial Books for Children for its annual short story contest. She won the award for the Asian American Division of unpublished Third World Authors, and was encouraged to expand the story into a novel.

This she did, and through the process Ho began to see writing as "a political expression," as she once wrote in Interracial Books for Children Bulletin. She had mistrusted the stories about Thailand, Burma, and China she previously read, for she thought that their mostly idyllic portrayal of lives there misrepresented the Asia that she came to know during her childhood. In Sing to the Dawn, Ho brought her readers into a realistic rural Thailand through the eyes of a young village girl Dawan, whose struggle to convince those around her to allow her to take up a scholarship to study in the city reflected the gender discrimination faced by girls in rural Thailand.

After graduating from Cornell University in 1973, Ho returned to Asia and began working as a journalist for The Straits Times in Singapore. She left two years later for Chiang Mai University in Thailand, where she taught English. The three years she spent in Chiang Mai had a deep impact on her. Together with her students and colleagues, Ho spent several periods living and working in nearby villages, as part of the ongoing student movement to alleviate rural poverty. While the student leaders were preoccupied with organizing the peasants into a political group in their search for democracy, Ho became more aware of the emotional world of the women and children there.

However, on October 6, 1976, Ho witnessed the massacre of student protesters in a military coup d'état which restored military rule in the kingdom. But she did not stay long under such circumstance. After marrying John Value Dennis, Jr., an international agriculture policy person whom she met during her Cornell years, Ho left for her alma mater again, where she completed a Master's course in creative writing while working as an English literature teaching assistant. She had also spent some time in relief work along the Thai-Cambodian border in 1980.

In 1986, Ho gave birth to her first child, a son. And finally, a decade after returning from Thailand, she began writing fiction again. The result was Rice without Rain, a story centering on Jinda, a seventeen-year-old girl from the fictitious Maekung Village which was caught up in the political winds sweeping across the country when a group of university students from Bangkok arrived to encourage the landless farmers to take up a rent resistance movement. Set against the very same historical background as Ho had experienced herself, Jinda's realization that the peasant class was but pawns in the ongoing political tug-of-war and her journey to find her own path in life told the untold stories during those years of turmoil that shrouded Thailand.

Five years later Ho published her third book, The Clay Marble. This time she drew her inspiration from the interaction with Cambodian refugees during her relief work on the Thai-Cambodian border. Once again, she presented a strong female protagonist, a twelve-year-old girl named Dara who was one of the thousands of refugees escaping to the border at the end of the Khmer Rouge regime when Vietnam invaded the country. She also employed the theme of family unity in the face of adversity, as Dara persuaded her elder brother not to join the army but to return with family, sans their father, to restart life back at home.

In 1983, Ho returned to Singapore, where she worked as the writer-in-residence at the National University of Singapore for the next seven years. As a result, she is widely referred to there as a "local writer". Her works have been selected as teaching material for English literature in lower secondary schools. Since 1990, Ho has been living with her family in Ithaca, New York. She has also traveled and made presentations at various writing workshops in middle schools and high schools in the United States and international schools in Switzerland, Indonesia, Thailand, Poland, and Malaysia.

After the birth of her third and last child Ho shifted her focus to writing books for children. Collaborating with Saphan Ros, executive director of the Cambodian Association of Greater Philadelphia, she published two books on traditional Cambodian folktales, The Two Brothers and Brother Rabbit: A Cambodian Tale. In the meantime, she even translated sixteen Tang poems into English and compiled them into a picture book titled Maples in the Mist: Children's Poems from the Tang Dynasty. In 2004, she returned to writing for more mature readers with Gathering the Dew, a story of how a young Cambodian girl who lost her sister during the Khmer Rouge regime learnt to reconcile with life's harsh realities and live on.

== Literary criticism ==
Minfong Ho, in her four novels, presented to her readers realistic depictions of her native Southeast Asia. Despite being fictions, her stories were all set against the backdrop of real historical events that she herself had experienced or at least observed firsthand. Her optimistic central theme remains similar throughout all four books. So do the central figures, who are all young girls facing harsh realities of life unimaginable by their more fortunate contemporaries in developed countries. With her sensitivity for the emotional world of her characters, Ho showed her readers the humane side behind atrocities of the October 6 massacre of student protesters in Bangkok and the Khmer Rouge regime. Against poverty, sexual discrimination, oppression, war, loss of loved ones, she maintained that human spirit should prevail.

Ho's ability to interpret the East to the West came chiefly from her own upbringing. Having been born in the then Burma to Chinese parents, she was brought up both in Singapore and Thailand, allowing her to acquire three languages. According to her, Chinese, her first language, is the language of her "heart", Thai the language of her "hands", and English that of her "head". This multifaceted linguistic ability, coupled with her childhood experiences, has perhaps given her a unique insight into the world she writes about, which is not easily attainable by foreign writers.

Although she does not avoid relatively mature subjects such as poverty and war, Ho's writings have been hailed as excellent reading materials for children and young adults. She has received many awards, including Commonwealth Book Awards from the Commonwealth Book Council and Best Books for Young Adults from the American Library Association for Rice without Rain, Pick of the Lists from the American Booksellers Association for The Clay Marble, and Best Books selection from the New York Public Library for Maples in the Mist: Children's Poems from the Tang Dynasty, among others.

In award-winning novels such as Sing to the Dawn, Rice without Rain, and The Clay Marble, Minfong Ho presents realistic depictions of her native Southeast Asia. Characteristically focusing on strong female protagonists who interact with their families and friends against the backdrop of real events, Ho is often recognized for the sensitivity and understanding with which she treats the feelings of her characters as well as for her depiction of Asian life and locale. Her books include stories for young adult readers and middle graders as well as picture books for younger children. In all of these works, Ho does not avoid the harsher elements such as poverty and violent death, but she also weaves the theme of the stabilizing influence of family throughout her work. A contributor in St. James Guide to Young Adult Writers explained that Ho "creates a world of great beauty and gentleness, with loving family relationships and ancient customs. But she also creates a world of poverty, drought, dreadful injustice, starvation, and death. Her protagonists are set between these two visions, but in that situation they discover their pride, integrity, and determination to love the land and overcome injustice."

== Bibliography ==
- Sing to the Dawn (1975, Lothrop, Lee & Shephard; 1979, Lotus Book House; 1985, Times Books International; 2005, Marshall Cavendish Editions) ISBN 0688516904 ISBN 9971652676 ISBN 9789812610010
- Tanjong Rhu and Other Stories (1986, Federal Publications) ISBN 9971404893
- Rice without Rain (1986, André Deutsch Ltd, Times Books International; 1990, Lothrop, Lee & Shepard Books; 2004, Times Editions-Marshall Cavendish; 2008, Marshall Cavendish Editions) ISBN 9780688063559 ISBN 0688063551 ISBN 9789812615718 ISBN 9789812615718
- The Clay Marble (1991, Farrar Straus Giroux; 1992, Times Books International; 2004, Times Editions) ISBN 0374412294 ISBN 9812043136 ISBN 9812329323
- The Two Brothers (1994, Lothrop, Lee & Shepard, with Saphan Ros) ISBN 0688125506
- Hush!: A Thai Lullaby (1996, Orchard Books, illustrated by Holly Meade) ISBN 0531095002
- Maples in the Mist: Children's Poems from the Tang Dynasty (1996, Times Editions, Lothrop, Lee & Shepard, translator and compiler) ISBN 9812046879 ISBN 068812044X
- Brother Rabbit: A Cambodian Tale, (1997, Lothrop, Lee & Shepard, with Saphan Ros) ISBN 0688125522
- Gathering the Dew (The Stone Goddess) (2003; 2005, Scholastic) ISBN 0439381983
- Peek!: A Thai Hide-and-Seek (2004, Candlewick Press) ISBN 0763620416
- Journeys: An Anthology of Short Stories (2008, Marshall Cavendish Editions) ISBN 9789812614797
- The Ho Minfong Collection (2010, Marshall Cavendish Editions) ISBN 9789814302456

Selected works of Minfong Ho have been translated into Thai, Chinese, Japanese, Korean, Tagalog and French. Among these, Sing to the Dawn was also adapted into a musical in 1996 for the Singapore Arts Festival.
