= The Clay Marble =

1991 novel by Minfong Ho

- Author: Minfong Ho
- Cover artist: Me Fung Ho

The Clay Marble is a 1991 children's novel by Minfong Ho. It is set in war-torn Cambodia after the fall of the Khmer Rouge in the early 1980s. It is about a girl named Dara and her friend Jantu, and illustrates the struggles they face.
