= David Elliott (children's author) =

American writer (born 1947)

- Born: 1947 (age 78–79)
- Education: Rhode Island School of Design
- Occupation: Author
- Website: davidelliottbooks.com

David Elliott (born 1947) is an American author of children's books in verse and prose. He taught creative writing, adolescent literature and playwriting at Colby-Sawyer College in New London, New Hampshire from 1998 to 2013. He also served as their director of International Student Services.

== Work ==
David Elliott grew up in Ohio and wrote his first story when he was 16 and sent it to The New Yorker magazine. He recalls that it was returned to him torn in half.

Many of his children's books are humorous stories in verse and prose. On the Farm and its successors are sets of pithy poems about the natural world. Bull is a verse novel for young adults retelling the myth of the Minotaur. Voices is a novel in medieval verse looking at Joan of Arc's life from various points of view.

== Awards and honors ==
The Children's Book Committee (CBC) at Bank Street College of Education has recognized Elliott's work numerous times. In 2024, his children's picture book of poetry, At the Poles (illustrated by Ellen Rooney) (Candlewick), received the Claudia Lewis Award for Younger Poetry and appeared on the Best Children's Book of the Year list with Outstanding Merit. His fictionalized biography, Voices: the final hours of Joan of Arc (Houghton Mifflin Harcourt) won the CBC's 2020 Claudia Lewis Award for Poetry and appeared on the Best Children's Book of the Year list with Outstanding Merit. In addition to these titles, The CBC's Best Children's Book of the Year list has featured other work by Elliott including The Seventh Raven, In the Woods, In the Past, Bull, The Two Tims, Nobody's Perfect, On the Wing, In the Sea, In the Wild, Finn Throws a Fit, On the Farm, What the Grizzly Knows, Evangeline Mudd and the Great Mink Escapade, And Here's to You!, The Transmogrification of Roscoe Wizzle, and The Cool Crazy Crickets.

== Published Works ==
- The Transmogrification of Roscoe Wizzle (2001)
- And Here's to You! (2004, illustrated by Randy Cecil)
- One Little Chicken: A Counting Book (2007, illustrated by Ethan Long)
- Jeremy Cabbage and the Living Museum of Human Oddballs and Quadruped Delights (2008)
- Knitty Kitty (2008, illustrated by Christopher Denise)
- What the Grizzly Knows (2008, illustrated by Max Grafe)
- Wuv Bunnies From Outers Pace (2008, illustrated by Ethan Long)
- Finn Throws a Fit (2009, illustrated by Timothy Basil Ering)
- Nobody's Perfect (2015, illustrated by Sam Zuppardi)
- Baabwaa and Wooliam (2017, illustrated by Melissa Sweet)
- Bull (2017)
- Voices: The Final Hours of Joan of Arc (2019)

=== Evangeline Mudd series ===
- Evangeline Mudd and the Golden-Haired Apes of the Ikkinasti Jungle (2004, illustrated by Andréa Wesson)
- Evangeline Mudd and the Great Mink Escapade (2006, illustrated by Andréa Wesson)

=== Hazel Nutt series ===
- Hazel Nutt, Mad Scientist (2003, illustrated by True Kelley)
- Hazel Nutt, Alien Hunter (2004, illustrated by True Kelley)

=== Nature series ===
- On the Farm (2008, illustrated by Holly Meade)
- In the Wild (2010, illustrated by Holly Meade)
- In the Sea (2013, illustrated by Holly Meade)
- On the Wing (2014, illustrated by Becca Stadtlander)
- In the Past (2018, illustrated by Matthew Trueman)

=== The Cool Crazy Crickets series ===
- The Cool Crazy Crickets Club (2010, illustrated by Paul Meisel)
- The Cool Crazy Crickets to the Rescue (2010, illustrated by Paul Meisel)

=== This Orq. series ===
- He Cave Boy (2014, illustrated by Lori Nichols)
- He Say "Ugh!" (2015, illustrated by Lori Nichols)
- He #1 (2016, illustrated by Lori Nichols)
