= Ho Kwon Ping =

Singaporean businessman (born 1952)

Ho Kwon Ping DUBC
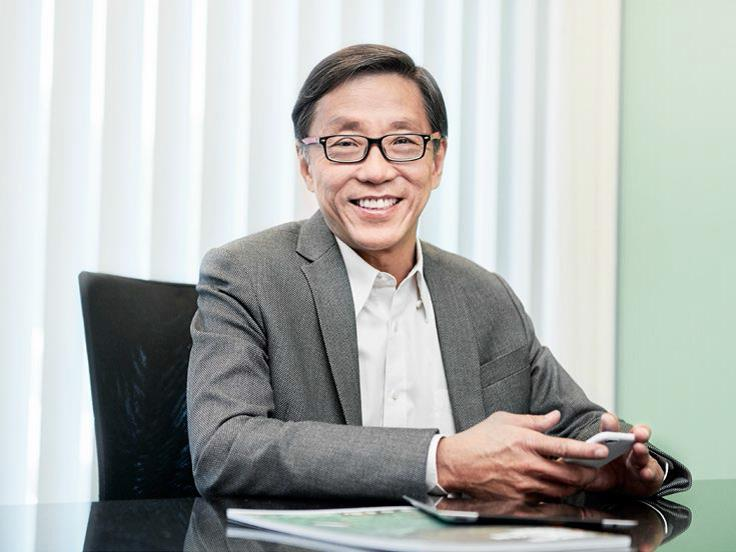

Banyan Tree Holdings Executive Chairman

Personal details
- Born: 24 August 1952 (age 74) British Hong Kong
- Citizenship: Singaporean
- Spouse: Claire Chiang
- Children: 3
- Education: Tunghai University, Stanford University, National University of Singapore

Ho Kwon Ping
- Chinese: 何光平
Transcriptions
Standard Mandarin
- Hanyu Pinyin: Hé Guāngpíng
Yue: Cantonese
- Jyutping: Ho4 Gwong1-ping4

Ho Kwon Ping DUBC (Chinese: 何光平; born 24 August 1952) is a Singaporean businessman. He is the founder and executive chairman of Banyan Group and Laguna Resorts and Hotels, and executive chairman of Thai Wah Public Company.

He was the founding chairman of Singapore Management University (SMU) and has chaired Singapore Power and MediaCorp Singapore. He has also served on the boards of Standard Chartered Bank, Diageo, Singapore Airlines, and GIC.

== Early life ==
Ho was born to Ho Rih Hwa, a businessman and diplomat, and Li Lienfung, the bilingual author.

Ho was born in Hong Kong, but spent his childhood in Thailand where his father, Ho Rih Hwa, was Singapore's ambassador to the country. He was educated in Thailand, Taiwan, the US and Singapore. He went on to Tunghai University in Taiwan where the exposure to Chinese culture left a deep impact on him. After a year in Taiwan, he left for Stanford University in the US. After returning to Singapore, he did his national service as a combat engineer. He later studied at the National University of Singapore, where he graduated in economics and history with a silver medal awarded by the Singapore Employers' Federation for being the second most outstanding student in the final year examination.

== Career ==
Currently, Ho Kwon Ping is the founder and executive chairman of Banyan Group and Laguna Resorts and Hotels, and executive chairman of Thai Wah Public Company. All three family-owned companies are listed in Singapore and Thailand.

He was the founding chairman of Singapore Management University (SMU) and has chaired Singapore Power and MediaCorp Singapore. He has also served on the boards of Standard Chartered Bank, Diageo, Singapore Airlines, and GIC.

In 1977, while working as a journalist for the Far Eastern Economic Review, an English Asian news magazine based in Hong Kong, Ho was detained under the Internal Security Act for writing articles in the Review and held in solitary confinement for two months. Many years later, in 2018, Ho shared in a candid dialogue session that he did not bear any grudges against Lee Kuan Yew, Singapore's founding prime minister, for detaining him. His detainment ironically boosted his academic grades as he was "so happy" to gain access to books that "he studied for 18 hours a day and topped the entire faculty in the examinations".

After Ho's release, he continued to work as a journalist, settling on Banyan Tree Bay in Hong Kong with his wife for three years. Ho's foray into the business world came several years later when he decided to join the family business after his father suffered a stroke. Assuming the mantle as the eldest son, Ho took the reins of the company. He went on to distinguish himself as a businessman, making the cover of Fortune International magazine in 1990, and opening the first Banyan Tree resort in Phuket in 1994.

Ho was appointed the inaugural S. R. Nathan Fellow by the Institute of Policy Studies in 2014, and delivered five public lectures on Politics & Governance, Economy & Business, Security and Sustainability, Demography and Family, and Society and Identity. Ho was conferred honorary doctorates by Johnson & Wales University in 2000, and Hong Kong Polytechnic University in 2015.

Among various awards, Ho has received the London Business School Entrepreneurship Award; CEO of the Year at the Singapore Corporate Awards; CNBC Travel Business Leader Award; Distinguished Alumnus Award from the National University of Singapore; and Lifetime Achievement Awards from the American Creativity Association, China Hotel Investment Summit and Australia Hotel Investment Summit.

Honoured for his contributions and accomplishments in the hotel industry in the Asia Pacific region and globally, Ho is the only two-time recipient of Hotel Investment Conference Asia Pacific – HICAP’s Innovation Award (2003) and Lifetime Achievement Award (2019) in its 30-year history. Most recently, Ho received the prestigious Outstanding Contribution award at AHEAD Asia 2024.

For his services to the country he has been decorated with the Meritorious Service Medal and the Distinguished Service Order by the Singapore Government.

In 2010, he became the first Asian to receive the American Creativity Association Lifetime Achievement Award in recognition of his creativity and innovation in various spheres of endeavour. In 2011, he was voted top Thinker in Singapore in the Yahoo! Singapore 9 Awards. In 2012, Ho was given CNBC's Travel Business Leader Award Asia Pacific 2012, in addition to being named to the board of Diageo, a British multinational.

In a 2018 interview article with Ho Kwon Ping, Singaporean media organisation Mothership said that Ho is "a man highly sought-after for his opinions" as "he is almost constantly being invited to conferences, organisations and educational institutes to give talks, sit on panels and get quizzed about geopolitical shifts, international relations, leadership, the business world".

In the interview article of Ho by Channel NewsAsia as Banyan Tree turned 25 in 2020, he is described as "easily one of Singapore's most recognisable entrepreneurs" as "the face of an award-winning hospitality empire that comprises 49 hotels and resorts, 64 spas, 76 retail galleries, and three golf courses in 23 countries".

== Personal life ==
Ho's father was businessman and diplomat Ho Rih Hwa. His mother was chemist and bilingual writer Li Lienfung. Ho is married to entrepreneur and former Nominated Member of Parliament, Claire Chiang. Claire is the co-founder and senior vice-president of Banyan Group, where she also chairs the company's China Business Development division and the Banyan Global Foundation. A strong advocate for gender equality and education, she served as a nominated member of Parliament from 1997 to 2001 and was inducted to the Singapore Women's Hall of fame in 2018.

In 2015, Ho wrote his first book, The Ocean in a Drop - Singapore: The Next Fifty Years, a compilation of his lectures during his time as the S R Nathan Fellow. He has also written a book, Asking Why, which reflects his journey in journalism and entrepreneurship.

In 2024, Ho Kwon Ping was the main subject of the book Behind the Banyan: Ho Kwon Ping on Building a Global Brand. The book shares the early beginnings of the Banyan Group along with portions from Ho's early life.

The couple has three children and five grandchildren.

== Bibliography ==
- Ocean in a Drop (World Scientific, 2015) ISBN 9789814730181
