= Gita Gutawa (album) =

Studio album by Gita Gutawa
- Released: 14 Maret 2007
- Genre: Pop, Symphonic pop, Musical theatre, Teen pop, Opera seria, Ballad, R&B, Pop rock
- Label: Sony Music Indonesia, Columbia Records
- Producer: Erwin Gutawa

Gita Gutawa (also known as Kembang Perawan, meaning Virgin Flower) is the debut album of Gita Gutawa. It was published by Sony Music Indonesia in 2007. After its launch, it sold 150,000 copies within four months, eventually being certified triple platinum. It also launched Gutawa's career.

== Production ==
According to Gutawa, she was approached by Sony Music Indonesia to produce an album after her duet with ADA Band, "Yang Terbaik Bagimu" ("The Best for You"), sold 800,000 copies. Gutawa, who at that time only sang as a hobby and had only recorded the duet by chance, accepted. She recorded the album only on weekends, for a period of a year.

Gutawa's father, noted composer and producer Erwin Gutawa, produced her album and did the arrangement on nine songs; "Your Love" and "Dengar" were arranged by Andi Rianto, and "Bukan Permainan" was arranged by Pink Pitt. Recording for all songs except "Bukan Permainan" took place in Antasari Studio in Jakarta; "Bukan Permainan" was recorded in Aluna Studio. The London Symphony Orchestra contributed some music. The album was mixed by Guy Gray of 301 Studio in Sydney, Australia; mastering took place at the Benchmark Studio.

== Track listing ==
No.	Title	Lyrics	Music	Length
1.	"Kembang Perawan" ("Virgin Flower")	Melly Goeslaw	Melly Goeslaw	3:16
2.	"Bila" ("If")	Glenn Fredly	Glenn Fredly	4:08
3.	"Bukan Permainan" ("Not A Game")	Dewiq	Dewiq	4:16
4.	"Surga di Telapak Kakimu" ("Heaven at the Soles of Your Feet")	Budi Rahardjo	Budi Rahardjo	4:57
5.	"Your Love" (Featuring Delon)	Ria Leimena	Andi Rianto	5:00
6.	"Doo Be Doo"	Eross Candra	Z. Mahola et al. (Note: Complete list of composers: Z. Mahola, J. Hawks, S. Attwell, A. Turest-Swarts, J. Sigauque, K. Smith, and P. Cohen. Originally published by Sony/ATV Music Publishing, South Africa. Gita Gutawa 2007, liner notes.)	4:13
7.	"Apa Kata Bintang" ("What Do the Stars Say")	Harry Budiman	Harry Budiman and Desty	4:34
8.	"Alunan Sebuah Lagu (Aluna Sagita)" (A Song's Oscillation (Aluna Sagita))	Lulu Gutawa	Erwin Gutawa	4:10
9.	"Sahabat Kecilku" ("My Little Friend")	Khrisna Balagita	Khrisna Balagita	4:06
10.	"Dengar" ("Listen" (Note: Published by Jawara Publishing. Gita Gutawa 2007, liner notes.))	Pia Utopia	Pia Utopia	4:20
11.	"Vocalizing"		Erwin Gutawa	3:38
12.	"To Be One"	Ria Leimena	Budi Bachtiar	3:27

== Release ==
Gita Gutawa was released in February 2007. It was well received, selling 150,000 copies within four months and receiving triple platinum certification. After the launch of the album, Gutawa was asked to play in the sinetron (soap opera) Ajari Aku Cinta (Teach Me Love), which used "Bukan Permainan" as its theme song; the role was mainly promotional. She was also invited to do numerous commercials, interviews and become the teen ambassador of six different companies. However, Gutawa felt that the public considered her popular only because of her father; as such, she began to work to convince people otherwise.

Because of the popularity of her album, Gutawa received the 2007 SCTV music award for best singer; the following year, SCTV awarded Gita Gutawa best album. The album also received the Anugerah Musik Indonesia award for Best Album, with Gutawa earning the Best Newcomer award.
