= Branded residence =

Housing affiliated with a hotel or luxury brand

A branded residence is a residential property developed in association with an established brand, most often a luxury hotel company, whose owners receive services and amenities linked to that brand. The brand usually licenses its name to a property developer in return for fees. According to the property consultancy Knight Frank, there were 903 completed branded residence schemes worldwide at the end of 2025.

== History ==
Early apartment hotels in New York, such as The Sherry-Netherland (1927) and the Carlyle Hotel (1930), combined private apartments with hotel services and laid the foundations for branded residences. The Sherry-Netherland's name drew on the reputation of Sherry's, a well-known New York restaurant. The building converted its apartments to cooperative ownership in 1955, and the Carlyle later did the same. In both buildings, residents own their apartments with hotel rooms continuing to operate alongside them. The model of combining hotel services with private residences gained momentum only in the late twentieth century, when luxury hotel companies began to expand into residential development.

In the 1980's, luxury hotel companies began attaching their brands to residences for sale, offering owners hotel-style service in their own homes based on the condominium hotel model. Four Seasons sold its first residences in Boston in 1985, and Aman launched the first international scheme in 1988, with 30 villas at Amanpuri in Phuket. Mandarin Oriental and Trump International were also early proponents, and Ritz-Carlton entered the market in 2000 with residences in Washington, D.C.

The British company YOO, founded in 1999 by property developer John Hitchcox and designer Philippe Starck, is credited by Knight Frank with pioneering branded residences that are not tied to a hotel.

The 2008 financial crisis slowed the sector, as the price premiums seen in earlier years became hard to achieve and buyers in many markets stopped purchasing second homes. At the time, branded residences were well established in the United States and the Caribbean and were becoming more prominent elsewhere, offered by operators such as Ritz-Carlton, Fairmont, St Regis, Banyan Tree and Kempinski.

== Business model and types ==
Branded residences are usually created through a partnership between a developer and a brand. The brand licenses its name to the project, and the developer pays the brand fees for its use. Owners generally pay management fees for the services provided, and in many developments they can rent out their units, although rental income is typically not the main reason buyers purchase. Unlike timeshares, in which buyers acquire the use of a property for a set interval each year, or fractional ownership, in which a property is sold in shares, branded residences are sold outright. Daye identifies four types:

- Co-located residences, which share a site and some amenities with a hotel
- Condominium hotel residences, which are units inside a hotel
- Standalone hotel residences, located near a hotel of the same brand but separate from it
- Non-hotel residences, associated with brands outside the hotel industry

Residents typically have access to facilities such as spas, fitness centres, pools and a concierge. In developments located next to a hotel, owners can often use hotel services such as room service, housekeeping and laundry.

Non-hotel brands active in the sector include fashion houses such as Armani, Elie Saab and Missoni, and automotive brands such as Aston Martin, Pininfarina and Lamborghini. In non-hotel schemes services are often provided by outside management companies.

== Market ==
According to Knight Frank, the number of completed branded residence schemes rose from 354 in 2015 to 903 at the end of 2025. Hotel brands accounted for about 70 per cent of operational schemes. By number of schemes, the largest hotel groups in the sector were Marriott International, Accor, Hilton, Four Seasons and Banyan Group.

The United States had the largest number of operational schemes, while the Middle East accounted for a large share of new development. Dubai was the largest city market, with 175 completed and planned schemes, followed by Miami and New York. More than half of schemes were located outside major cities, in coastal, island or mountain destinations, compared with fewer than four in ten in 2016.

According to Savills, branded residences sold at an average premium of about 35 per cent over comparable unbranded properties in 2019, although the premium varied widely by location and was smaller in mature markets such as New York.
