= Haddad Alwi =

Indonesian nasheed singer

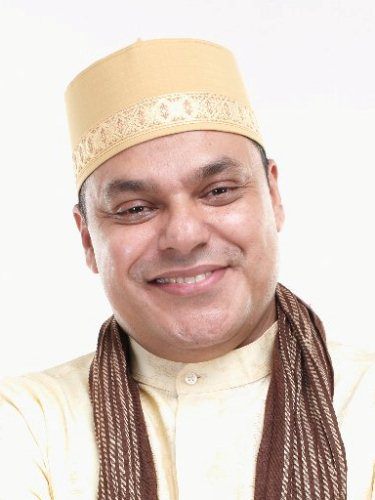

Background information
- Birth name: Haddad Alwi Assegaff
- Born: 13 March 1966 (age 59)
- Origin: Banjarnegara, Indonesia
- Genres: Nasheed
- Labels: Musika Selaras Citra (1997—2004); Sony Music Entertainment Indonesia (2003—2009); Warner Music Indonesia (2007); Falcon Music (2010—2013); Sugi Surya Gemilang (2015—present); GP Records

Haddad Alwi Assegaff (Arabic: حداد علوي السقاف Ḥaddād Alawī al-saqqāf) (born 13 March 1966 in Jakarta, Indonesia) is an Indonesian nasheed singer and actor. His first album, Cinta Rasul 1 (1999) is the best-selling nasheed album in Indonesia.

== Discography ==
=== Album ===
- 1999: Cinta Rasul
- Cinta Rasul 2
- Cinta Rasul 3
- Cinta Rasul 4
- Cinta Rasul 5
- Cinta Rasul 6
- Cinta Rasul 7
- Jalan Cinta
- Jalan Cinta 2
