= Sing to the Dawn =

- Author: Minfong Ho
- Language: English
- Genre: Short story
- Publisher: William Morrow & Co
- Publication date: 1975
- Publication place: Thailand
- Media type: Print (Hardcover & Paperback)
- Pages: 160 pp
- ISBN: 0-688-41690-X
- OCLC: 1103075
- LC Class: PZ7.H633 Si

Sing to the Dawn is a story by Chinese-American author Minfong Ho, which was originally published as a short story and was awarded first prize by the Council of Interracial Books for Children in New York City in 1975. It was later extended to a full-length novel.

== Plot summary ==
Dawan, a young village girl, gets first place in an examination and wins a scholarship to study in a city school. Her brother, Kwai, places second in the examination and is initially jealous, creating a rift between the two previously-close siblings. This hostility is further exacerbated by Dawan's father, who feels that the city is no place for a girl, and that Dawan should give in to Kwai and let him go to the city instead of her.

Dawan eventually overcomes these obstacles and proves to herself and to others that she is fully capable of handling the scholarship and the responsibility it entails. But she faces the disapproval of her father, who remain's convinced that city life and further schooling are not for a girl.

== Adaptations ==
- Sing to the Dawn was adapted into a critically acclaimed musical by Singaporean composer Dick Lee in 1996 and was directed by Steven Dexter. The musical has proved extremely popular after its initial run, and has been restaged several times, including a restaging by the Singapore Management University's production house in 2003 and a joint production between Raffles Institution and Raffles Girls' School in 2004.
- A full-length feature animation based on the book was produced in collaboration by MediaCorp Raintree Pictures, the Media Development Authority of Singapore and Infinite Frameworks, and was released on 30 October 2008, with the Chinese title of 曦望. The movie was localised into an Indonesian version with the title "Meraih Mimpi" and released on Indonesian cinemas on 16 September 2009.
