= Erwin Gutawa =

Indonesian composer (born 1962)

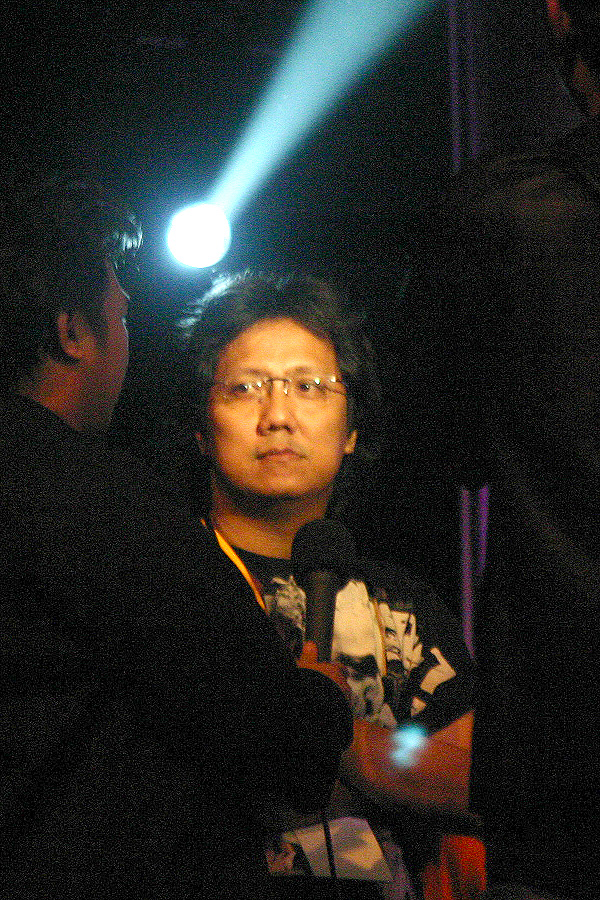
- Erwin Gutawa in 2004

Background information
- Born: Erwin Gutawa Sumapraja; 16 May 1962 (age 64); Jakarta, Indonesia
- Occupations: Arranger; Bassist; Conductor; Composer; Producer
- Years active: 1985–present

Erwin Gutawa Sumapraja (born 16 May 1962) is an Indonesian composer. In 1985, he started his professional music career by joining the jazz band Karimata, later becoming an independent composer in 1991. As a composer, he won the 1992 Midnight Sun Song Festival in Finland, together with Ruth Sahanaya. In 2001, he won the Anugerah Musik Indonesia award for best music arranger for his concert Rockestra.

== Biography ==
Erwin Gutawa was born in Jakarta, Indonesia, on 16 May 1962. As a child, he enjoyed playing basketball and association football. During this period he also played music on Bina Musika under the direction of Agus Rusli on Televisi Republik Indonesia. As a teen, he continued playing music with his friends. After graduating high school, Gutawa earned a bachelor's degree in architecture from the University of Indonesia.

In the early 1980s Gutawa worked as sound arranger for the TVRI series Telerama. However, his professional career began in the 1985 when he joined the jazz band Karimata as a bassist, playing along with Candra Darusman, Aminoto Kosin, Denny T.R. and Uce Hariono. Together with Karimata, he performed at the North Sea Jazz Festival in The Hague that same year.

During that period, he also worked as an arranger and producer for other singers. After Karimata disbanded in 1991, Gutawa formed his own orchestra and worked as a composer. Besides composing, Gutawa also organised concerts for other artists.

On 3 November 2000, Gutawa presented Rockestra, a rock concert featuring Slank, Gigi, and Dewa. Involving an orchestra of 85 musicians, the concert was held at the Plenary Hall of the Jakarta Convention Center. Guest musicians included Ahmad Albar, Roni Harahap, Jockie Soerjoprajogo, and Nicky Astria.

On 16 May 2002, Gutawa celebrated his 40th birthday by holding his first solo concert, Konser EG. It took place at the Plenary Hall of the Jakarta Convention Center and also featured Chrisye, Ruth Sahanaya, Krisdayanti, Sheila on 7, and Slank. Since then, he has held numerous concerts, including the Islamic-themed The Spirit of Ramadhan (2008) and a farewell concert for his daughter Gita Gutawa entitled A Masterpiece of Erwin Gutawa (2011).

In 2005, Gutawa went to London, England to work as a conductor at the London Symphony Orchestra in Royal Albert Hall.

In 2010, Gutawa was selected to be one of the judges for Indonesian Idol's sixth season.

== Personal life ==
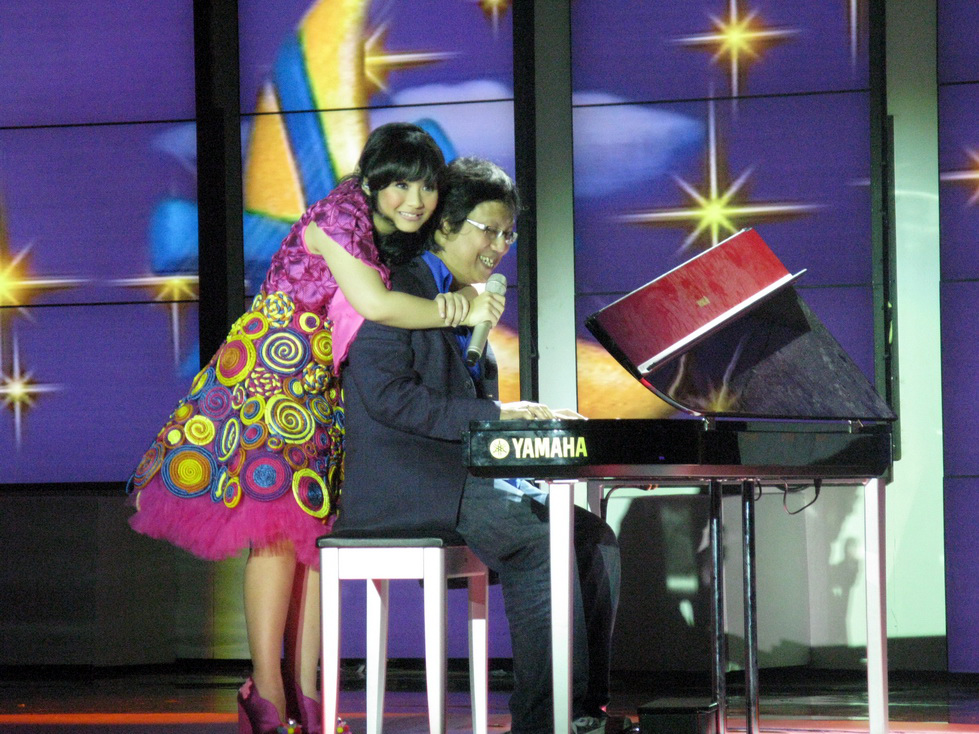
Erwin Gutawa and his daughter Aluna Sagita, 2008

Gutawa is married to Lufti Adriani, also known as Lulu. Together, they have two children, Aluna Sagita and Aura Aria Gutawa. He enjoys cycling and home cooking, especially Indonesian food.

== Legacy ==
In 1992, Erwin Gutawa and Ruth Sahanaya's song "Kaulah Segalanya" (English: "You are Everything") won the 5th Midnight Sun Song Festival in Finland. In 2001 he won the Anugerah Musik Indonesia award for best music arranger for his album Rockestra.

Gutawa has been described as having "a Midas touch" for music, with a sharp intuition.

== Partial discography ==
(As arranger)

- Kala Cinta Menggoda (1997, for Chrisye)
- Badai Pasti Berlalu (1999, for Chrisye)
- Konser Tur 2001 (2001, for Chrisye)
- Dekade (2002, for Chrisye)
- Senyawa (2004, for Chrisye)
- Salute to Koes Plus/Bersaudara (2004)
- Rockestra (2007)
- Balada Shalawat (2010, for Gita Gutawa)
