= Pop kreatif =

1970s Indonesian pop music genre

- 1987 cassette cover of a pop kreatif compilation tape, featuring various pop artists. The tagline reads: "They call it... Pop Kreatif."
- Other names: Indonesian city pop (popular)
- Stylistic origins: Pop; funk; R&B; disco; soft rock; progressive rock; city pop; yacht rock; jazz fusion; boogie; new wave; electronic; bossa nova; Balinese; Javanese; Kroncong; Moluccan
- Cultural origins: Late 1970s – late 1990s, Indonesia
- Derivative forms: Pop urban

Other topics
- Indo pop; Pop melankolis

Pop kreatif (English: creative pop) is an Indonesian offshoot and subgenre of Indo pop that emerged in the late 20th century as a fusion of Indonesian music and contemporary global influences such as funk, jazz, disco, new wave and soft rock. Rooted in urban culture, the genre is often characterized by its smooth melodies, upbeat rhythms, and nostalgic themes. Initially, the genre had been associated and reflective to the rapid modernization and economic growth of Indonesia during the 1980s and early 1990s. By the late 2010s, pop kreatif gained popularity among Indonesian youth and has seen a resurgence within the Indonesian music scene.

According to Wallach, pop kreatif can be described as "fashionable, urban pop supported by the upper-middle class of cities." It emerged as a distinct form of music that diverged from the mainstream trends of the time. Other terms associated with the genre include "contemporary pop," "trendy pop," and "high-class pop" (pop kelas atas). Though pop kreatif developed as a distinct genre, the global resurgence of Japanese city pop has led to modern-day listeners referring to it as "Indonesian city pop".

== Definition ==
The term "pop kreatif" first appeared in Indonesian media in the 1980s. Journalists Seno M. Hardjo and Bens Leo were cited to have popularized this term to differentiate the music presented by musicians such as Guruh Soekarnoputra, Eros Djarot, Chrisye, Fariz RM, and Dian Pramana Poetra from the musical artists of the pop melankolis genre. Frans Sartono, a former journalist for the daily Kompas who often collaborated with Bens Leo, stated that the term "pop kreatif" emerged from a discussion over how to classify different kinds of Indonesian pop music. According to Sartono, Bens Leo suggested that songs by Rinto Harahap, Pance Pondaag and similar composers be described simply as pop songs, while songs by Chrisye, Yockie Suryoprayogo, Eros Djarot and Addie MS be classified as "pop kreatif". In the late 1980s, the BASF Awards and HDX Awards, both later precursors to the Anugerah Musik Indonesia award, adopted a "Pop Kreatif" category to accommodate works outside the commercially dominant pop associated with Rinto Harahap, Pance Pondaag and Ari Wibowo. From so, the term was standardised across the Indonesian market.

Ihsandia Muhammad of Geotimes described pop kreatif as featuring intricate instrumental arrangements, with prominent use of synthesizers and other electronic instruments. The lyrics of pop kreatif songs are often poetic and introspective than those of mainstream pop music, thus coining the term. The term itself also shaped public perception, positioning the genre as sophisticated and emblematic of the glamour of urbanists, in stark contrast to pop melankolis, which was often dismissed as tacky, rural, and outdated by the younger generation at the time. Indonesian composer Erwin Gutawa once described two distinct decades of pop kreatif; the 1980s as the era of solo vocalists, and the 1990s as the era of bands.

The ban on pop melankolis had created an opportunity for musicians experimenting with jazz fusion and new wave styles, characterized by heavy use of synthesizers, to rise to prominence. Leveraging new technologies like synthesizers and drum machines, Indonesian musicians drew inspiration from Japanese City Pop, European Synth Pop, and American Boogie, blending these styles with Indonesia's musical undertones and flow taken from genres such like Gamelan and Keroncong. Arista Estiningtyas of Tirto.id noted that artists who are categorized within the creative pop genre tended to focus on creating unique rhythms, melodies, harmonies, instruments, dynamics, styles, and creative lyrics.

== Musical origin ==
The origins of pop kreatif can be traced back to Indonesia's long history of musical fusion. Even before the genre's formal emergence, Indonesian music was marked by the integration of local traditions with external influences. Wallach cites genres like Kroncong and Dangdut that showcased this blending; with Kroncong drawing from Portuguese folk traditions and Dangdut incorporating elements of Indian film music. During the 1960s and 70s, the rise of Pop Melayu entered Indonesia's ability to merge Western pop music with regional Malay musical styles. Artists such as Rhoma Irama introduced modern instruments and pop arrangements into traditional forms, laying the groundwork for the eventual development of pop kreatif. At the time, president Sukarno had banned all rock-and-roll music, which he pejoratively called "Ngak-Ngik-Ngok" music. Sukarno considered Western songs as hedonistic and a display of cultural imperialism from which was contrary to the personality of the Indonesian nation. The government took stringent measures to suppress cultural influences perceived as Western or counterproductive to its vision of national identity. This extended to popular music, where bands and individuals produce or played such songs faced sanctions and even jailtime.

After the 30 September Movement and the subsequent rise of the New Order regime, the political ramifications of Sukarno's anti-Western stance in the arts and culture left Indonesia's creative industry relatively isolated from contemporary global music genres. During this period, particularly in the 1960s and early 1970s, the Indonesian music industry primarily focused on promoting traditional folk music and regional styles. This isolation persisted until the mid-1970s, when the New Order government aggressively pursued foreign investment and unchecked crony capitalism attributed to the Berkeley Mafia. This led to the rise of a capitalist elite and the infusion of foreign cultural influences. Alongside this economic boom, Indonesia's burgeoning tourism and entertainment industries adapted to global tastes. During this period, Indonesian musicians increasingly incorporated rock, disco and jazz fusion into their compositions. While imported records remained influential, Indonesian artists continued to adapt foreign styles through local musical practices.

=== Early beginnings ===
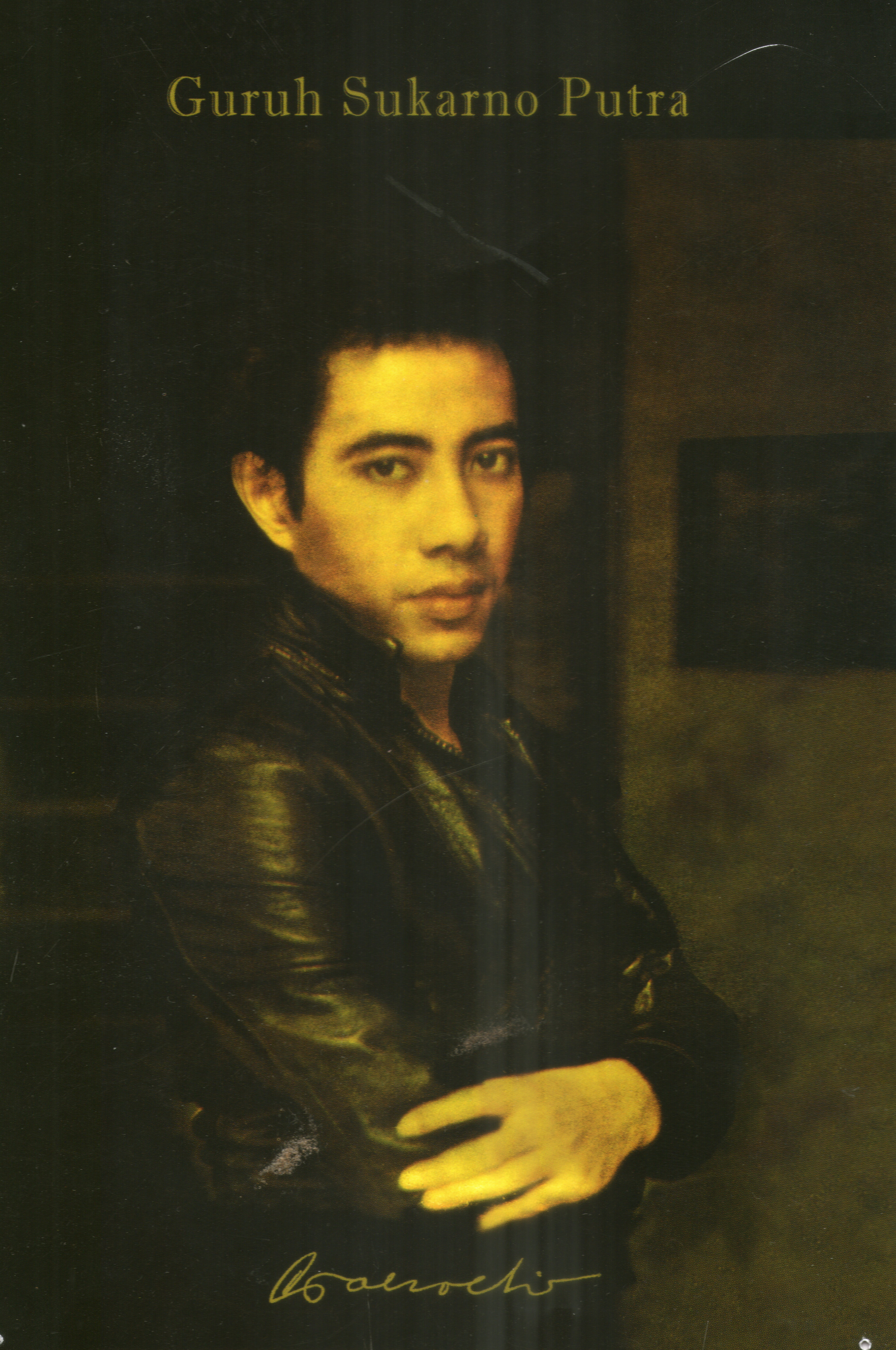
Portrait of Guruh Sukarnoputra

Pop kreatif was heavily influenced by progressive rock and jazz, particularly during its emergence in the mid-1970s. Progressive rock pioneers played a significant role in shaping the pop kreatif phenomenon. One key figure was Guruh Sukarnoputra, the son of Indonesia's first president, Sukarno, who could be said as the founder or one of said pioneer in the genre. Western music-obsessed intellectual elites around Guruh increased the popularity of pop kreatif from the late 1970s onwards. Guruh co-formed Gipsy in the mid-1970s, a group known for its innovative fusion of progressive rock and traditional Indonesian instruments, such as the Balinese gamelan. The group released their self-titled album, Guruh Gipsy, in 1976. Although the album's avant-garde style and experimental nature did not achieve commercial success at the time, it was later reevaluated and recognized as a foundational work in the history of Jakarta music. Guruh Gipsy gained acclaim for its influence on Indonesia's music scene. In December 2007, Rolling Stone Indonesia selected Guruh Gipsy as the second-best Indonesian album of all time, behind another pop kreatif album, Badai Pasti Berlalu. Three of its songs, Badai Pasti Berlalu, Merpati Putih, and Merepih Alam, were listed by Rolling Stone as among the best Indonesian songs ever released whist the album was listed as the best Indonesian album of all time.

The post-breakup activities of members of Guruh Gipsy significantly influenced the development of pop kreatif. After 1977, Guruh Sukarnoputra, Chrisye, and the Nasution brothers, Keenan Nasution and Debby Nasution, emerged as key figures in the genre. The Nasution brothers played a role in nurturing Indonesia's pop kreatif movement by personally mentoring the new generation of musicians from their home in Menteng. Their residence became a hub for musical collaboration, where emerging talents such as Elfa Secioria received guidance and as a gathering place for contemporaries in the pop kreatif scene. Two major works from 1977 are widely regarded as pioneering efforts in pop kreatif: the soundtrack for the melodrama film Badai Pasti Berlalu (The Storm Shall Pass) and the Lomba Cipta Lagu Remaja (LCLR) anthology. These albums showcased a sophisticated, Western-oriented style of pop music distinct from traditional Pop Melayu and sentimental pop. Members of Guruh Gipsy, including Chrisye and the Nasution brothers, collaborated with Yockie Surjoprajogo, keyboardist of the rock band God Bless, on both projects. To academic Kim Yujin, their work demonstrated the potential for a refined, modern form of Indonesian pop music. Guruh Sukarnoputra would also contribute to the advancement of pop kreatif by composing works for Chrisye and mentoring a new generation of musicians who would shape the genre in the 1980s. The soundtrack for Badai Pasti Berlalu was overseen by Eros Djarot, who had previously been active in the progressive rock scene of the 1970s. Thus prominent figures from Indonesia's dying rock "golden age" transitioned to become key players in the early development of pop kreatif.

=== LCLR competition ===
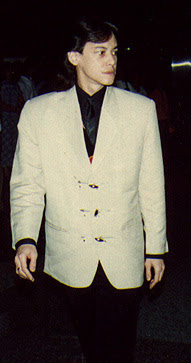
Fariz RM, who contributed to the emergence of pop kreatif

Music intellectuals, especially those with some classical background, condemn pop outright as an art form that is, in English terms: dumb, vulgar, cheap, tasteless, rough, crude, degrading, uninspired ... Pop music is commercial music. So when pop musicians are asked to think, they think about profit. The people who compose, sing, and bankroll the recording of pop songs are not thinking about whether what they record has ethical value, or whether that art can withstand criticism in an aesthetic sense. What they think about is this: once the recording is finished and advertised for a month on TVRI at a cost of Rp. 2.5 million, it will bring them a profit of Rp. 25 million.

— Remy Sylado in Prisma (1977), on the commercialization of Indonesian pop music.

The pop kreatif genre was popularized by young artists who participated in the "Lomba Cipta Lagu Remaja" festivals in 1977 and 1978. In the mid-1970s, Indonesian pop music was dominated by groups like Koes Plus, Favorite's Group, Panbers, The Mercy's, and D'Lloyd. Their music tended to have similarities in melody, chords, and simple lyric writing patterns. Music critic Remy Sylado criticized the shallowness of themes in Indonesian pop music at that time, noting that almost all songs were filled with the word "Mengapa!" (English: Why!). Prambors Radio, once known to be a radio station that caters to young people, then created a competition through LCLR, sought to harness the creative potential of young people in songwriting and, according to Prambors representative Imran Amir, "[...] to address the stagnation of the pop music industry, which had become overly commercial and monotonous."

In its first implementation, LCLR 1977 produced the song "Kemelut" by Junaedi Salat, sung by Keenan Nasution, as the first winner and "Lilin-Lilin Kecil" originally by James F. Sundah, sung by Chrismansyah Rahadi, which was chosen as the "Favorite Song" based on listeners' choices. Among the ten winners, three songs were then created by a vocal group from a local highschool, SMA Negeri 3 Jakarta, as one of the winners: "Akhir Sebuah Opera," "Angin," and "Di Malam Kala Sang Sukma Datang." Students like Fariz R. Munaf, Adjie Soetama, Raidy Noor, and Iman RN later were later described as movers in Indonesian pop music. Fariz RM has expressed admiration for his predecessors, referring to figures such as Chrisye, Harry Roesli, the Nasution brothers, Yockie Suryoprayogo, and others as his "big brothers" for their influence.

In LCLR 1978, the song "Khayal" by Christ Kayhatu and Tommy WS became the first winner, while "Kidung" by Chris Manusama was selected as the "Favorite Song." This event continued to produce songwriters such as Ikang Fawzy, Dian Pramana Poetra, Yovie Widianto, and many others. In the 1977‒1978 era, with the height of popularity within the LCLR competition, several musicians like Chrisye, Keenan Nasution, Eros Djarot, and God Bless were open about producing alternative works to mainstream melancholic pop music. By LCLR 1978, the musical arrangements presented by Yockie Soerjoprajogo in LCLR thought to have led to wide experinmentalisation. Harlan boer of Pophariini noted Yockie's tendency to adopt progressive rock elements with keyboard-dominated instruments presented broader chords and more poetic lyric writing in the musical arrangements of Indonesian Pop. This style of musical arrangement then continued when Yockie Soerjoprajogo worked on Chrisye's solo albums such as Sabda Alam, Percik Pesona, Puspa Indah Taman Hati, Pantulan Cinta, Resesi, Metropolitan, and Nona who would be a signature of then's indonesian pop. Jazz influences began to appear in LCLR 1980 with arrangements crafted by Abadi Soesman and Benny Likumahuwa. By the 1980s LCLR then prioritized emerging music trends, making it a barometer of innovation in the Indonesian pop music industry and an artist favorite. With the Indonesian Music Museum cited LCLR's contribution as "an early revolution of pop music in Indonesia" due to the music talents, musicians, writers, and singers it had introduced.

With cassettes and tape recorder eventually being sold with lower prices since the end of the 70's, this has then allowed most of the Indonesian population to enjoy songs from foreign bands as interest from outside culture and music began to seep in from the New Order's cultural relaxation policy. The success of LCLR led to Prambors Radio packaging its songs to the wider public in the form of cassettes. Both cheap cassettes and radio had led to the mass propagation of the pop kreatif genre. Finalist songs from LCLR were regularly introduced on TVRI through a special program, and the competition's final night was broadcast nationally. The television exposure helped bring the songs to audiences across Indonesia and contributed to their commercial success, including works with more complex compositions than much of the mainstream commercial pop then circulating in the market.

=== Harmoko and the fall of pop melankolis ===
"Stop it with that kind of songs!"

— Harmoko, on the "whiny pop" industry.

In the late 70's, pop kreatif was in competition with Melancholic Pop, a mellow music genre that takes its inspiration from 1950's American Traditional Pop. According to Philip Yampolsky, he argued that Melancholic Pop had drawn Indonesians as a way to express criticism to the New Order government and reflect over the living conditions, political repression, and economic situation inherited by the government. As so, Remy Sylado criticised the genre as producing "mass-produced hits", arguing that major record companies were commercializing and "raking in profits from weepiness." In an interview with BADAI TiVi, Pop kreatif musician Deddy Dhukun described the genre's emergence as a struggle against the dominance of pop melankolis saying that he and his contemporaries were "[...] fighting pop that was different from ours." He once criticised record producers for favouring formulaic songs in the pop melankolis style and recalled that pop kreatif compositions were initially rejected by studios because producers "did not understand them", even after presenting sample songs. Dhukun stated that, when he and Dian Pramana Poetra submitted their music to Musica Studios, they were instead encouraged to imitate the label's existing releases. According to Deni Sujana of Radio Republik Indonesia, the pop melankolis genre had racked millions in sold cassette tapes, and such had incentivized record companies to stick to successful formulas.

In a televised speech at the 26th Anniversary of the TVRI, Harmoko would publicly denounce the genre after listening to a then hit song "Hati Yang Luka" released in 1988, created by Obbie Messakh and sung by Betharia Sonata. He ordered an immediate ban on "whiny pop", stating "the matter of the song Hati Yang Luka, which singer Betharia Sonata used to sing while crying, really attracted attention." It is also speculated that President Suharto personally disliked the song. In Harmoko's view, such songs were seen as obstacles to national development, as he believed they failed to "foster work enthusiasm." He then criticized the content of TVRI's programs, which he described as being filled with "low-taste laments of broken spirits, broken households, or whiny things," deeming them unsuitable for promoting a productive and motivated society. It is alleged that he hated the song as it contained lyrics that 'paralyzed the spirit', which was considered very contradictory to the spirit of development echoed by the New Order government. The subgenre was eventually banned from airing on TVRI, Indonesia's national and only television network, in 1988 by Harmoko, Indonesia's Minister of Information at the time. From this ban, it had left many artists bankrupt and led to the destruction of the once dominating pop melankolis industry.

Damar Senoaji of Mojok.co argued that the New Order government helped popularise the label "whiny pop" as "a way of manipulating public opinion to make people perceive the music as 'kampung music'." By contrast, he wrote that the New Order government promoted the term ''pop kreatif'' so that the music would be "perceived by the public as songs for city dwellers, modernists, and high-class people". He argued that both labels formed part of a process of Suhato's wider stigmatisation policy, which contributed to the absence of the pop melankolis genre from the Indonesian music market in the 1990s. One result of the dichotomy was that artists previously regarded as ordinary pop musicians were increasingly grouped into one of the two categories, prompting objections from figures such as Rinto Harahap, who rejected the characterisation of his songs as "close to being whiny" nor intended to "make people cry". Without hindrance, pop kreatif and Indonesian jazz fusion began to develop rapidly along the years, starting from an underground movement to mainstream, with the government actively promoting the genre and led to the popularization of pop kreatif artists through national broadcasting. Deddy Dhukun suggested the year 1987 as a turning point, after which pop kreatif began to gain wider acceptance.

According to a Culture of Soul writer, the courtship of the government to heavily promote the genre was likely also that of politics and business. To which, Suharto had "[...] aggressively courted western corporations to do business in Indonesia, which led to the need for more and more entertainment to distract the expatriates after hours." Such had contributed to the growth of discotheques, nightclubs, and restaurants in Jakarta that had a culture of the "[...] traditional Indonesian ambience with the sexy ultramodern pulse of the disco beat." Such had made artists such as Chaseiro, Rafika Duri, the Rollies, and Lydia Kandou to adopt synthesizers, drum machines, and modern studio-production techniques in their music whilst drawing on Western pop, rock, funk, boogie, disco, jazz, yacht rock, and Japanese city pop for inspiration.

== Popularity ==
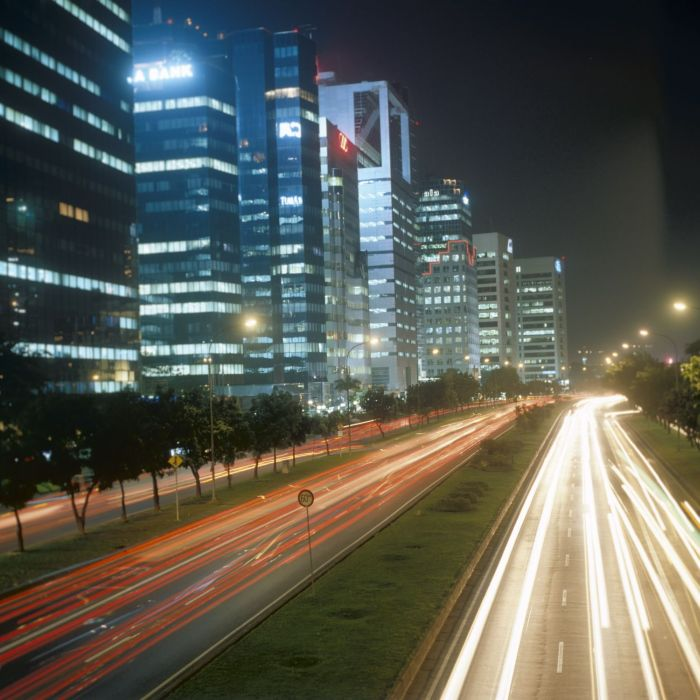
Jakarta during its era of rapid urbanization in the early 80-90s, contributed to the wide appeal of Pop kreatif.

The emergence of pop kreatif in the late 20th century coincided with Indonesia's rapid urbanization and increased exposure to global culture under the cultural relaxation of the New Order government. To the deduction of Alvin Yunata of Harper's Bazaar, International music trends like Western disco and funk influenced Indonesian airwaves, inspiring local artists to create music that reflected the lifestyles of an urbanizing Indonesia while maintaining local appeal. Pop kreatif artists adopted modern production techniques and global aesthetics, but they also retained distinct Indonesian elements, such as formatting and melodic structures. The genre resonated strongly with Indonesia's growing middle class, urbanites, and the leisure class who sought to embrace cultural affinity with foreign culture.

"Jawab Nurani" from Hotel San Vicente (1981)
A track from Transs's Jawab Nurani. Note the usage of synthesizers and creative wordplay; a prevalent element of Pop kreatif.

Popular singers and/or composers in this subgenre include Chrisye, Fariz RM, KLa Project, Utha Likumahuwa, Vina Panduwinata, January Christy, Harvey Malaiholo, Christ Kayhatu, Lydia Kandou, and Dodo Zakaria. The genre also gave recognition to songs popularised by such artists, whose music involved figures including Addie MS, Dodo Zakaria, Yockie Suryoprayogo, and Billy J. Budiarjo. The genre also gave rise to Indonesia's first boy band group, Trio Libels. Just as Japanese city Pop often regards singer-songwriter Tatsuro Yamashita as the "King of City Pop," the pop kreatif genre in Indonesia sometimes considers Chrisye as its "Raja." The success of Badai Pasti Berlalu soundtrack and Fariz RM's Sakura album became the momentum for the growth of pop kreatif. Fariz RM and Dian Pramana Poetra are examples of musicians who succeeded in this genre. The album "Sakura" (1980) by Fariz RM and "Indonesia Jazz Vocal" (1982) by Dian Pramana Poetra received positive responses and captivated much of the Indonesian new generation. After the success of the solo album "Sakura", artists such as bassist Erwin Gutawa, Uce Haryono on drums, and keyboardist Eddie Harris, held intent on the "renewal of Indonesian music in color, personality and style." Collaborating with Fariz RM, they formed Transs, a group dedicated to jazz fusion music focused on improvisation and infused with influences from genres such as bossa nova, samba, disco, and funk. According to Fariz RM, the name Transs was derived from the shortened form of "Transition", as it "[...], more or less show 'renewal' within music and generation," believing that the band would bring a "transition" in the Indonesian music industry. Mukthi of historia.id deducted that the band was driven by a personal agenda to challenge and innovate the existing musical scene, aiming to introduce new styles and influences. Their album "Hotel San Vicente" went on to become one of the most acclaimed Indonesian Jazz fusion music albums, Rolling Stone Indonesia later placed it at number 35 on its list of "The 150 Greatest Indonesian Albums of All Time" in issue no. 32, published in December 2007.

=== Jazz Fusion and the Yamaha connection ===
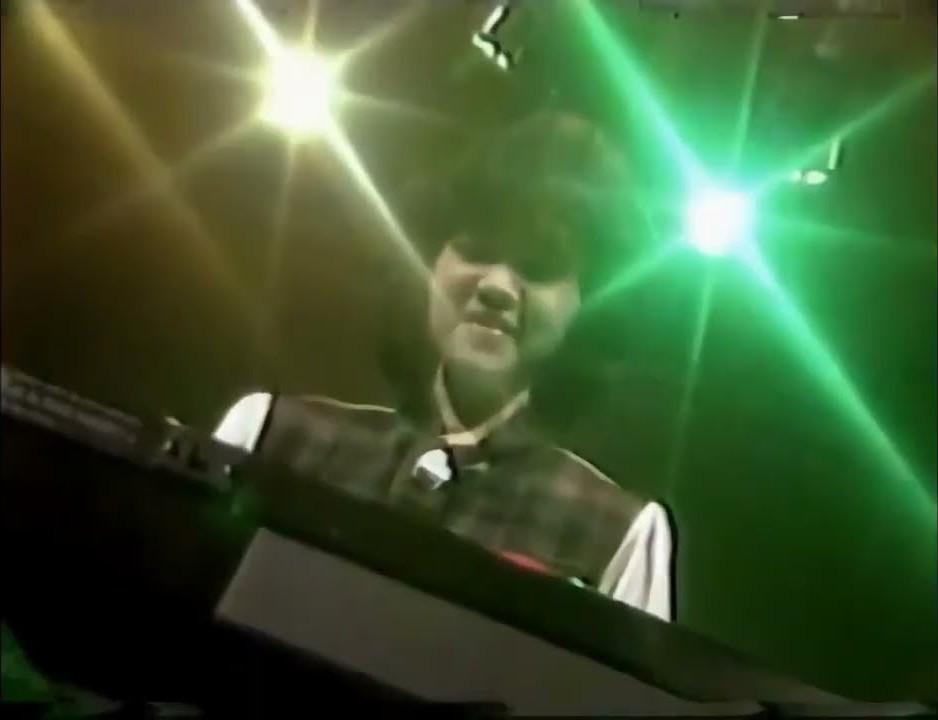
Still image of Yani Danuwijaya, a student of Elfa Secioria's music school, performing in Indonesia 6 (1989).

Music historian and critic Denny Sakrie argued that Transs later became one of the blueprints for the development of fusion music in Indonesia as well as the pioneer of the birth of other music groups with jazz fusion styles such as Karimata, Krakatau, Black Fantasy, Emerald Band, Bhaskara 86, and others. Whilst Dicky Harisman of Pikiran Rakyat suggested that the emergence of Casiopea, a pioneering Japanese jazz-rock group, also influenced the formation of several Indonesian jazz-rock and fusion bands, including Krakatau, Karimata, and Emerald Band. Works such as "Halle", "Midnight Rendezvous", "Galactic Funk", "Asayake", and "Black Joke" became popular in Indonesia and helped inspire local jazz fusion musicians. Jazz had a significant influence on pop kreatif, with many performers of the genre being exposed to jazz during their childhood. Indra Lesmana, son of Jack Lesmana (who was known as the "father of Indonesian jazz"), became a prominent figure in pop kreatif after forming the band Krakatau in the 1980s. Similarly, singers from affluent families, such as Candra Darusman, developed a love for jazz early on, influenced by their parents' musical preferences. Jazz became a defining element of pop kreatif partly due to the contributions of graduates from the music school "Elfa Studio," established by jazz musician Elfa Secioria. Many of these graduates rose to prominence as pop kreatif performers. Dwiki Dharmawan, a member of Krakatau, was among those influenced by Elfa's teachings, having learned jazz piano under his guidance at a young age. At one point for Krakatau and Casiopea's reunions, both bands had once shared a stage and played against each other at the 21st Economics Jazz at Gadjah Mada University.

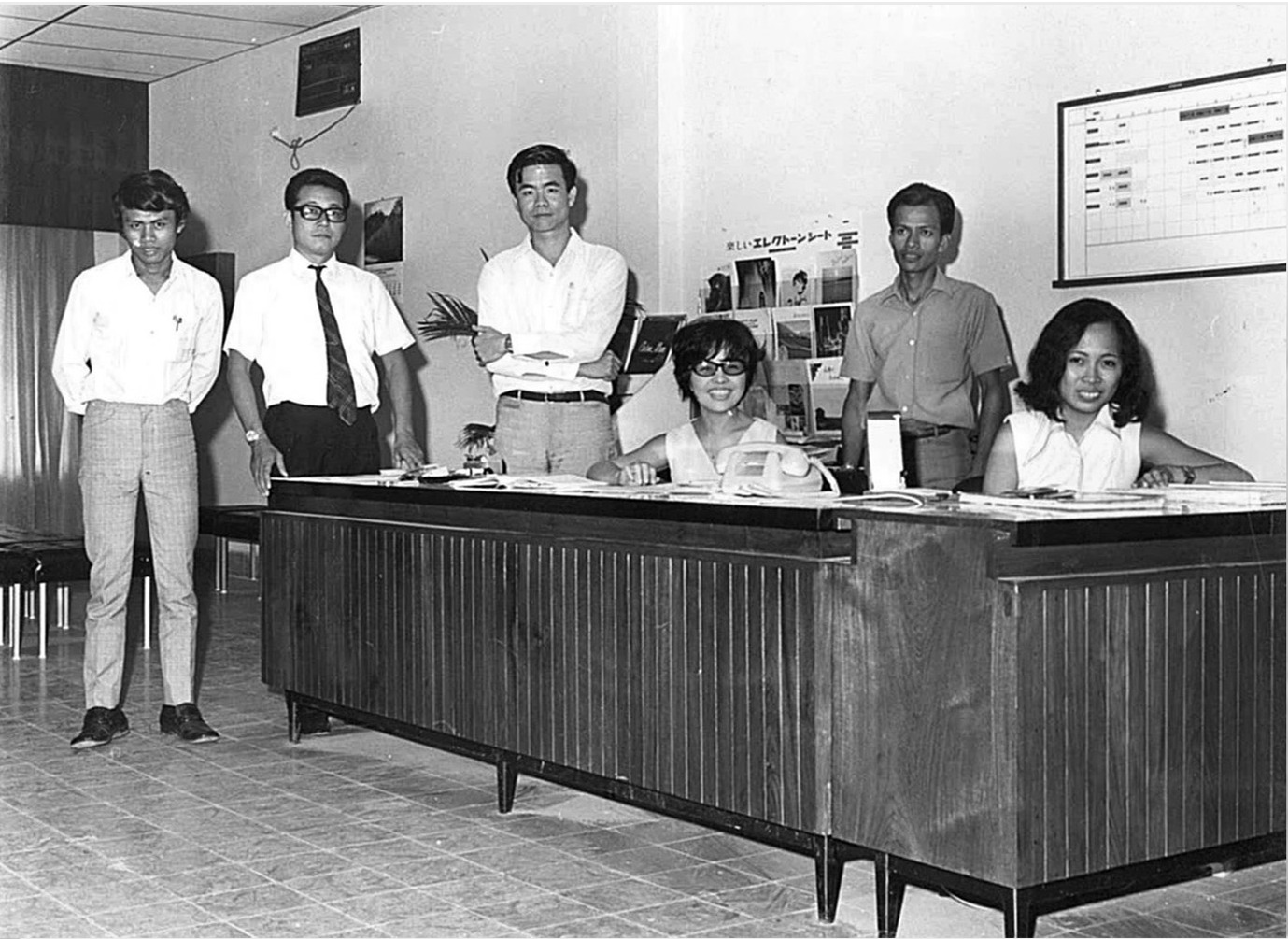
Start of the Yamaha Music Foundation on Jl. Hayam Wuruk, Jakarta in 1971. Yasuke Sato pictured second from the left.

Such bands would gain recognition through their participation in the Yamaha Light Music Contest in Japan. The exportation of music was favored by the government, allowing groups like Krakatau, Emerald, and Karimata to break into the mainstream. Cooperation between Indonesia and Yamaha started in 1970, when Yasuke Sato, a representative of the Yamaha Corporation, met with Sri Sultan Hamengkubuwono IX, then State Minister of Economics, Finance, & Industry and Sultan of Yogyakarta, to discuss the potential for cooperation in promoting music in Indonesia. This partnership ultimately led to the establishment of the Yamaha Music Foundation, under the leadership of Police Chief Hoegeng Iman Santoso, who was then known as "the singing general" and was recognized for his passion for music. The foundation was later renamed the Indonesian Music Foundation (YMI) and played a significant role in advancing music education and promotion in Indonesia. Starting out as a sponsorship, Yamaha would often promote artists, composers, and bands by holding competitions abroad and/or at local competitions in Indonesia (such as the "Band Explosion" and "Music Quest" competitions).

Collaborators of Elfa Secioria were often paired with writer Wieke Gur. Dewi Safitri of the BBC, once wrote that Wieke Gur wrote "lyrics that flowed and led to songs that became hits in the 80s and 90s." Her work contributed to the popularization songs performed by artists such as Harvey Malaihollo, Elfa's Singers, Emilia Contessa, Yopie Latul and Shakila, and included entries that reached domestic and international stages. Indonesia 6, a group formed by Elfa Secioria, won awards at the Yamaha Light Music Contest in Tokyo in 1987; Yani Danuwijaya was named "Best Keyboard Player International" and Dezzy Arnas won "Best Bassist Player". Following their success, Indonesia 6 released the song "Fatamorgana", which was heavily inspired by the Japanese jazz-fusion band Casiopea. Other standout performers included Squirrel Band from Surabaya, which earned Dewa Budjana the title of "Best Guitarist" in 1984, and Krakatau Band, which won the Light Music Contest Indonesia in 1985 and subsequently performed in Tokyo. Dwiki Dharmawan achieved recognition as "Best Keyboard Player," while Emerald Band garnered two awards in Japan. This government support provided these bands opportunities to showcase their talents on platforms like TVRI and RRI. Through these televised performances, they reached wider audiences, expanding their fan base and introducing new music styles to the Indonesian public.

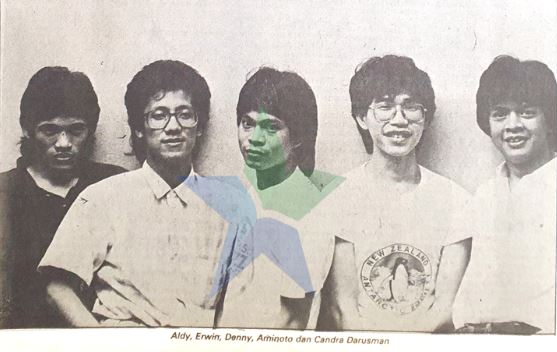
Members of Karimata in 1987.

In the late 1980s, KLa Project emerged and strengthened the pop kreatif genre with new wave influences and the use of synthesizers. Their debut album with hits like "Tentang Kita" and "Yogyakarta" marked the golden era of KLa Project and expanded the acceptance of pop kreatif music in Indonesia. The Indonesian Popular Song Festival reached its heyday in the mid-80s, in the sense that the songs produced won international awards as well as selling in the market. In 1985, the FLPI committee managed to get 12 songs that were selected as 'truly best'. Almost all songs became hits, and the winners were able to speak at International Festivals, specifically that of the World Pop Song Festival (世界歌謡祭) at Budokan Hall, Tokyo, Japan. In 1982, Harvey Malaiholo performed "Lady" by Anton Issoedibyo, Fariz RM, and the Symphony group at the WPSF, earning the Kawakami Special Award, outperforming Celine Dion and Bryan Adams. In 1985, Vina Panduwinata's song "Burung Camar" won the Kawakami Awards, outperforming entries from other finalists such as La Toya Jackson and David Pomeranz. Harvey would continue to gain recognition in subsequent years, winning "The Best Singer" award in 1986 for his performance of "Seandainya Selalu Satu," composed by Elfa Secioria and Wieke Gur. In 1987, Yopie Latul then won as the last winner of the Kawakami Awards ever held by the competition for his performance of "Kembalikan Baliku", created by Guruh Soekarnoputra with arrangements by Candra Darusman. Other Indonesian acts also gained international exposure, included Bhaskara 86 who were notable for its appearance at the North Sea Jazz Festival in Europe.

=== Decline and split to pop urban ===
With the fall of the New Order government, the monopoly on the country's airwaves came to an end. This shift allowed new media companies to emerge, providing the Indonesian populace with a greater variety of options and genres to explore. pop kreatif was eventually overshadowed by a genre known as Pop Melayu originating from Malaysia. The emergence of Pop Melayu, with its sentimental and melodious lyrics, marked a period when pop kreatif began to decline in popularity. In the late 1980s and early 1990s, Indonesian music trends then began to shift from pop music to the emerging slow rock genre. This change was sparked by the success of the Malaysian rock group Search and its lead vocalist, Amy (Suhaimi), who achieved massive popularity with their hit song "Isabella". Amy's influence in the Indonesian music scene was soon followed by the rise of Nike Ardila, whose hit "Bintang Kehidupan" solidified slow rock's place in Indonesia. As the tastes of Indonesian audiences gravitated toward slow rock, the commercial viability of melancholic pop songs declined significantly. Pop kreatif, along with Pop Melancholis, once heavily promoted through government-backed platforms like RRI and TVRI, struggled to achieve the same levels of success in the changing music scene. By the early 2000s, pop kreatif was gradually forgotten by music enthusiasts, eventually fading into obscurity as pop melayu captured the public's attention. By 2008, pop kreatif had become a niche genre, with its popularity primarily sustained by older generations who had grown up with its music. Its presence in the Indonesian music scene was largely maintained by a small community of bloggers and music archivists dedicated to preserving and documenting the genre. That same year, Fariz RM criticised the state of Indonesian pop music, saying that, in his view, it was "much better two decades or even five years ago". He argued that the Indonesian music scene had a "deficit of ideas and references" and was marked by the "blatant repetition of the same musical concepts", which he said to have led to a decline in musical appreciation. Fariz also partly blamed mobile-phone ringtones and shorter concert sets for such decline.

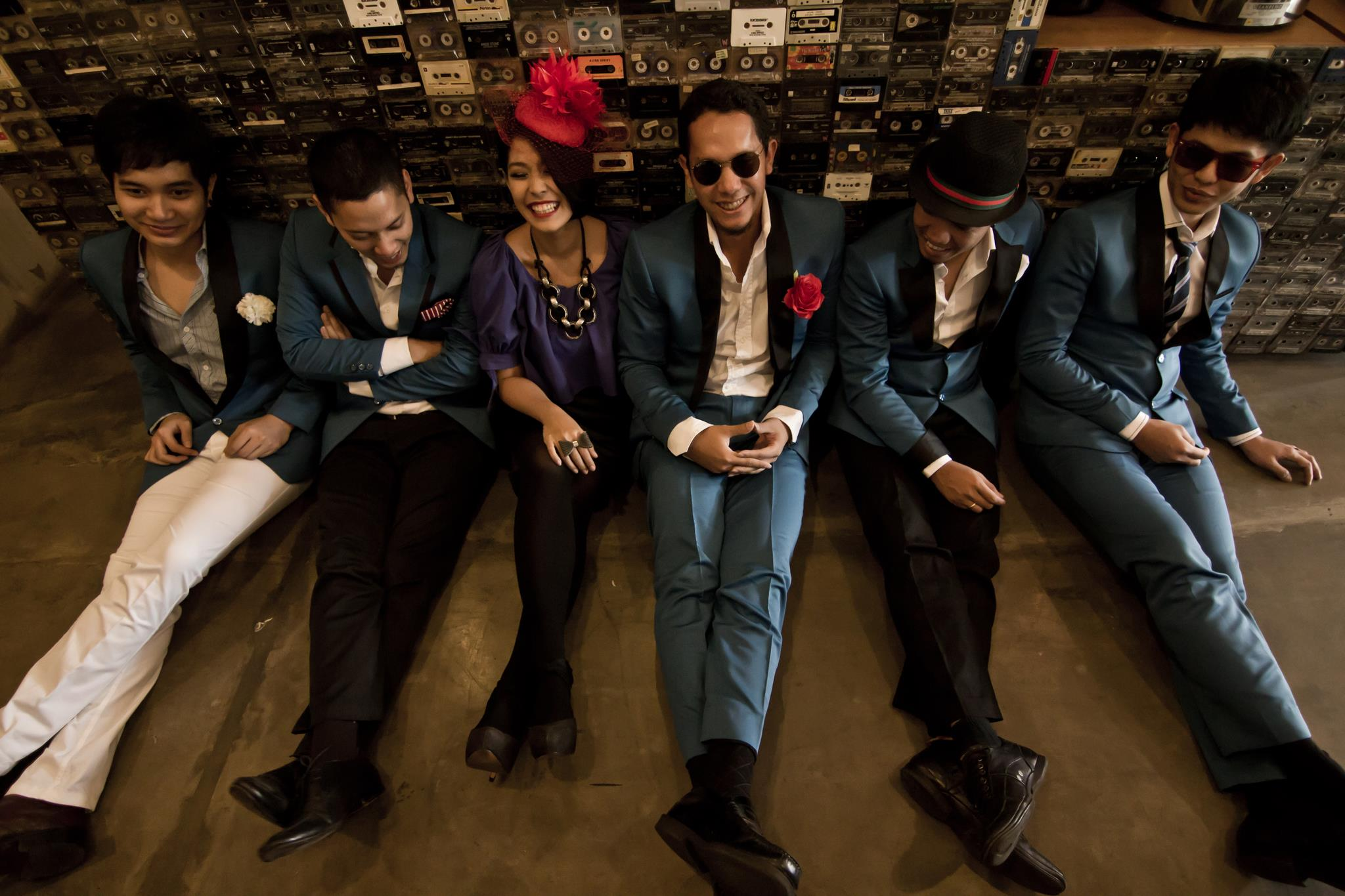
Maliq & D'Essentials, pictured in 2012, were associated with a shift in the musical direction of pop kreatif in the 2000s, as soul, R&B, and brass jazz influences became more prominent.

Attempts at reviving the pop kreatif genre prior to its emerging trend in the 2010s were meager, as the Indonesian music landscape became increasingly diverse with the emergence of various other genres. One notable effort was the Pagelaran Zaman Emas Fariz RM concert, held on August 21, 2003, at Plenary Hall, JCC Jakarta. The event's lineup included Sherina Munaf, Reza Artamevia, Titi DJ, Katon Bagaskara, Warna, /rif, and Syaharani. Dwiki Dharmawan was appointed to arrange the musical compositions for the concert. The concert was considered a commercial failure with low turnout of 2,000 attendees in a venue with a 5,000-person capacity. There was also pushback from the music industry regarding the pop kreatif genre. The Anugerah Musik Indonesia (AMI) committee had set the renaming the category to "Pop urban" for its 2013 AMI Awards competition. The committee deemed the name took offense at the implication that songs outside the pop kreatif classification might be perceived as "lacking creativity", arguing that all music genres should be "continuously refined over time." An unintended consequence of the attempt to rename pop kreatif to "pop urban" was the division of the genre into two separate distinct varieties. The first retained the original synth-heavy, 1980s-inspired sound, exemplified by artists like Fariz RM, while the later emerged in popularity post-2010, incorporating more contemporary elements of soft jazz and modern funk, groove-oriented style, represented by acts such as Maliq & D'Essentials, Ecoutez!, RAN, Soulvibe, and Tompi, then popularly labeled as 'maliq's music' to describe such style.

According to Susi Ivvaty of Kompas, such bands wanted to deviate pop kreatif to "survive in an industry still dominated by similar pop-rock bands, which sounded similar to each other." Maliq's music' opted to retain a pop structure, but used jazz-influenced progressions and chords, giving their music a sound closer to neo-soul. Once debuted, Maliq & D'Essentials were initially labeled as pop kreatif and was once hailed by the media in the mid-2000s as the start of the "revival of pop kreatif". Though as years pass, it later sprung a movement for the popularity of "pop urban". According to Widi Puradiredja, prior to the rise of Maliq & D'Essentials and similar bands, there were already groups performing a similar style of music, such as Humania, The Groove, and Bunglon. However, these earlier acts struggled to gain significant attention from both the music industry and the general public, as their music was perceived as being too complex or heavy for mainstream appeal. By the recycling of pop kreatif with a more jazz-oriented sound, such arrangement was seen as making the style "more easy for the ears of younger listeners."

=== 21st century resurgence ===
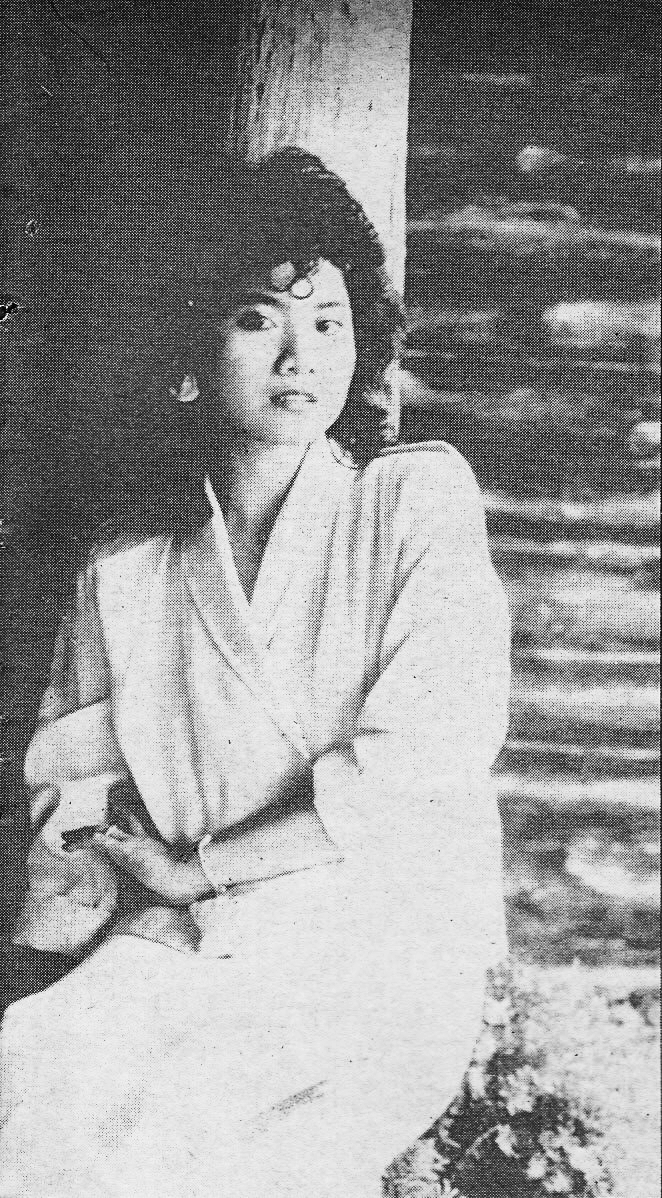
Vina Panduwinata, an Indonesian pop kreatif singer whose work has attracted renewed attention amid a revival of the genre.

"Aku Semakin Ragu" by Lydia Kandou (1982)
Although some songs may sound similar to its Japanese counterpart, songs within pop kreatif had developed independently to the citypop genre.

With growing interest from younger generations, many Indonesians have begun referring to pop kreatif from the 1980s and 1990s as "Indonesian City pop." This trend, appearing in the 2010s in Indonesia, has gained traction among young music enthusiasts, coinciding with the global revival of Japanese city pop, which has been fueled by the rise of internet streaming platforms like YouTube and Spotify. To Wisnu Dewabrata of Kompas.id, a major factor behind Indonesia's city pop and pop kreatif revival was the popularity of Miki Matsubara's "Stay With Me," which in turn renewed attention to songs such like Christ Kayhatu's "Kau Yang Ceria" on social media. Hakam Alghivari of Radar Bojonegoro noted that Spotify and YouTube algorithms had frequently promoted songs with a "lighthearted feel, gentle melodies, and harmonious arrangements" as a factor in the music's renewed popularity, noting the prevalence of pop kreatif songs on nostalgia- and city pop-themed playlists. Such songs are also widely used in short-form videos, where it had "[...] become part of the digital aesthetic favored by the younger generation." A similar phenomenon has also been observed in the revival of Japanese city pop. Spotify Indonesia data from 2024 shows a 120% increase in streaming of 'Indonesian City Pop'-themed playlists compared to the previous year, driven largely by renewed interest among Millennial and Gen Z listeners. As a result, Indonesian youths have been rediscovering pop kreatif, embracing its nostalgic charm and its parallels to the cosmopolitan aesthetics of Japanese city pop. The revival of Indonesian, Malaysian, and Japanese city pop had also led to an interest amongst young people to buy physical media, largely vinyls.

There is no well-defined or established connection between Japanese city pop and pop kreatif. However, both genres share a common root in soft rock and jazz fusion. Both also appealed to the urban leisure classes in their respective countries, amid rapid technological and socio-economic change. Japanese popular music were also circulating in Indonesia, with names such as Mariya Takeuchi and Tatsuro Yamashita being known in the country during this period. Tatsuro Yamashita reportedly gained popularity in Indonesia through the release of songs such as "Morning Glory", "Mermaid", and "Rainy Walk". In the context of the musical development of pop kreatif, scholar Kitano wrote, "it would not be wrong to think of [pop kreatif] as the equivalent of Japanese pop after the emergence of so-called 'new music,' such as Tatsuro Yamashita." Sommet and Kat suggest, however, that the development of both Japanese city pop and Indonesian pop kreatif likely paralleled each other, in line with broader trends in the reception of Western popular music across Asia throughout the 20th century, thereby defining their similarities. Adding that the influence of soft rock, jazz fusion, funk, and disco from the United States and Europe played a crucial role in shaping both genres, as local musicians adapted these styles to their own cultural and musical landscapes. This historical context may also contribute to the contemporary revival of city pop, as listeners across Asia and beyond, rediscover and reinterpret these genres within a modern musical framework.

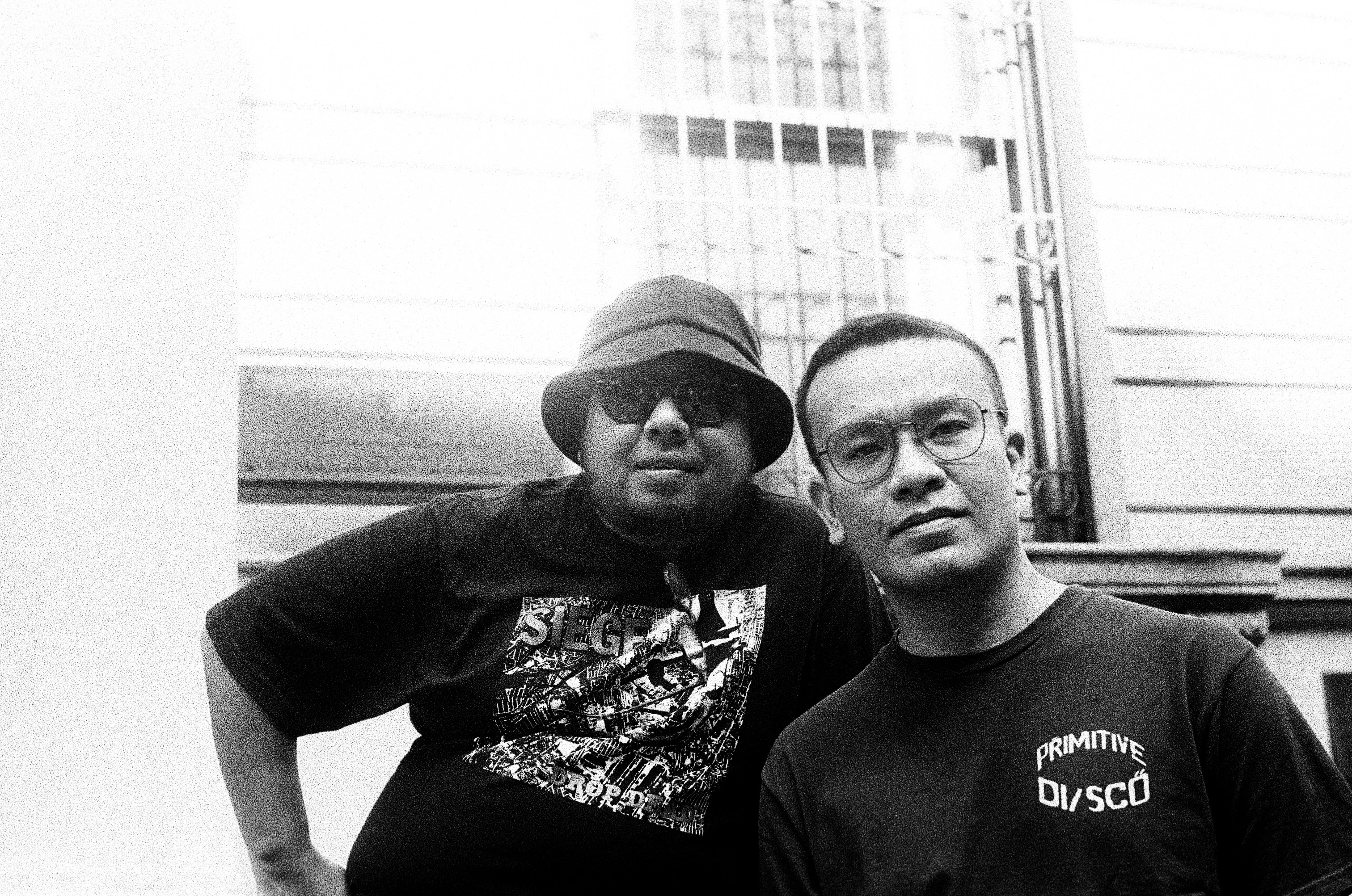
Fadli Aat and Merdi Simanjuntak of Diskoria, recognized for their efforts in bringing local Indonesian disco-pop kreatif music to the wider audience.

While some Indonesian artists, primarily from the Indie music scene, such as Mondo Gascaro, Kurosuke, and Ikkubaru (イックバル), have sought to directly emulate Japanese city pop and can fall within the label of "Indonesian city pop", the broader classification of pop kreatif as "Indonesian City Pop" is controversial. This broad categorization has led to the inclusion of genres such as Indonesian disco, 90s hard rock, and even proto-pop-Malay groups under the same label, diluting the distinct identity of pop kreatif. Anto Arief of Pophariini believes that this blending can cause confusion, particularly for international listeners seeking to understand the unique characteristics of pop kreatif as a genre. Member of Diskoria, Merdi Simanjuntak, expressed disagreement at this categorization to the group and wider labeling of genre as a whole, stating, "I could only laugh!" Musician Fariz RM once commented on his connection to the city pop genre by stating that his inspiration came from a wide range of sources, not exclusively from Japanese city Pop. He credited much of the genre's influence to figures like Harie Dea as its actual originator. When asked about the term "Indonesian City Pop" and whether it should be an established genre, Fariz RM personally rejected the label, saying that "the term didn't come from musicians, but from observers or listeners. [...] musicians are solely responsible for making music." Whilst commenting on the city pop trend after releasing a song under the label as part of her revival, musician Ruth Sahanaya remarked, "Actually, this is the same genre I performed on my early albums. [...] It is only now that people call it by that name, even though it was the same kind of music back then."

The hallmark of city pop-style songs that are gaining popularity in Indonesia today, sometimes known as Pop urban, lies in their blend of influences from incorporating elements of funk, electronic music, and jazz. While "Indonesian city pop" playlists have been largely dominated by music from the 1980s, many contemporary musicians within the Indonesian music industry are increasingly producing their own pop kreatif-inspired tracks. To differentiate pop kreatif and contemporary pop urban, Ruth Sahanaya observed that, within the genre, contemporary songs tend to be "much more straightforward" and use language closer to everyday conversation, while songs from her era tended to "have more poetic lyrics." Among the prominent figures in this upbringing is Diskoria. Starting with their debut track "Balada Insan Muda" and gaining widespread recognition with "Serenata Jiwa Lara", Diskoria has played a pivotal role in reintroducing Indonesian music from the past, repackaged in a Jazz and modern-pop disco style that resonates with today's youth. Artists such as Laleilmanino and Lalahuta can be also said as pop kreatif revivalists. Additionally, the works of artists like Vira Talisa, Mondo Gascaro, Aya Anjani have also emerged as significant contributions to the current era of the genre in the Indonesian music scene. Current trends usually revolve around creating and remixing new songs that deliberately emulate the old pop kreatif/city pop sensibilities. A notable reintroduction of old-esque Indonesian Pop is that of Adikara's "Primadona". Made as a homage of the genre, the song had been played more than 150,000 times on TikTok and 1,7 million times in YouTube, and had at one point reached the top 5 on the Billboard Indonesia chart for 7 weeks in 2024.

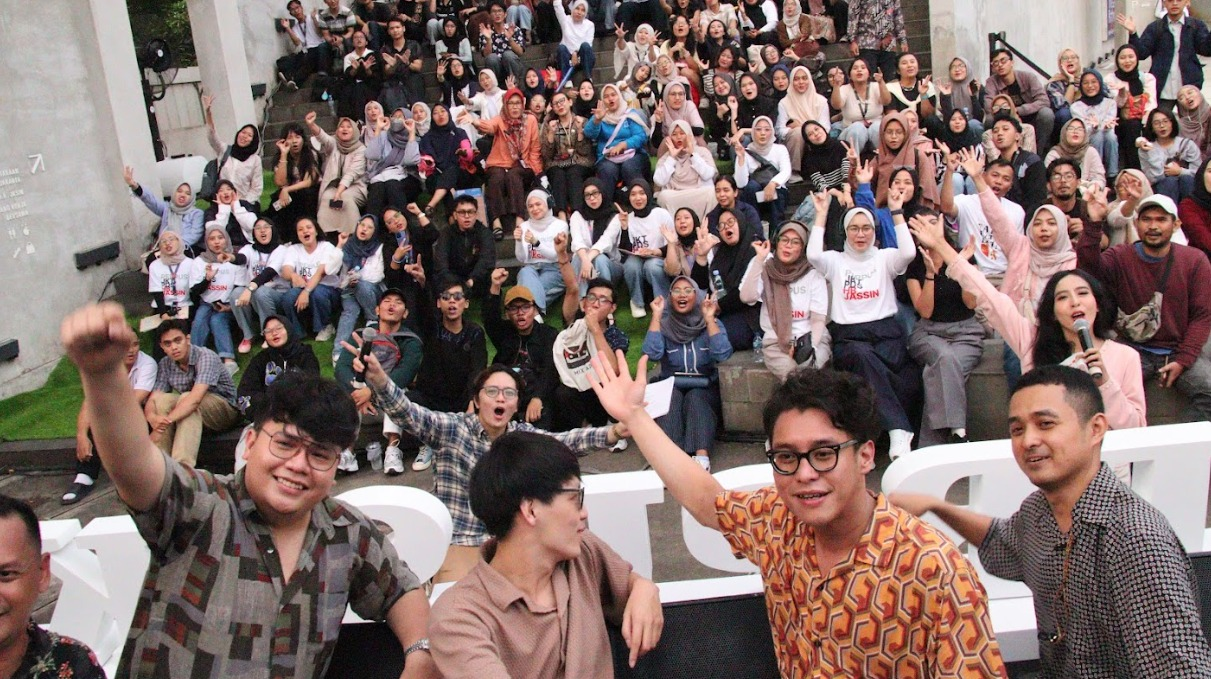
Wijaya 80, an Indonesian jazz fusion revivalist indie band, performing at the Jakarta Library on 8 August 2025.

Momentum for interest within the genre led the recycle of old pop kreatif songs into a mini album, "Lagu Baru dari Masa Lalu Volume 1" released by Demajors, an independent record label. In the essence of the now defunct LCLR competition, it was an attempt by music archivist organization, Irama Nusantara, to appreciate and inspire more artists delving into the pop kreatif genre. The album was pushed in the hopes of improve the copyright management and archiving of old Indonesian pop kreatif songs. For the project, five songs from the 1980s were arranged and re-sung by eight different musicians. The first track of the album, "Walau dalam Mimpi", which is a song from the album of the same name by jazz singer Ermy Kullit, was arranged and sung by Dhira Bongs. Adoria and Vira Talisa performed Jimmie Manopo's "Dunia yang Ternoda". Aya Anjani, daughter of pop kreatif musician and singer-songwriter Yockie Suryo Prayogo, recycled his song "Terbanglah Lepas" together with Parliament Pop. Andien and Mondo Gascaro sang a duet song "Kisah Insani" which was first popularised by Chrisye and Vina Panduwinata. Christianto Ario Wibowo or known by the name Kurosuke performed a song from Transs music group "Senja dan Kahlua". Attempt by music archivist, Munir Septiandry, had also uncovered and tried to re-release many of pop kreatif's lost songs through an archive titled "Tanamur City." The project serves as both a cultural preservation initiative and a tribute to Indonesia's first discotheque, Tanamur, which played a pivotal role in shaping the country's urban music and nightlife scene during its heyday.

== Influence ==
=== In Malaysia ===
Pop kreatif in Malaysia is a relatively young genre. Culturally and musically, Malaysia did not have a robust 80's Music scene. Music such as Malaysian Hip Hop and rap was not accepted by the mainstream media, which was dominated by government-owned stations and was labeled as Haram by stations, mainly Radio Televisyen Malaysia (RTM). This followed a 1986 declaration by the Association of Muslim Ulama, a body of religious officials, that all forms of pop music were haram (forbidden). It also held that women who sang for a living were violating Islamic requirements of female modesty, a position that was echoed by major Islamic political parties in Malaysia, which condemned popular music and its performers as "immoral". Some pop kreatif songs were also banned for being deemed "not to meet Islamic law" by RTM, specifically its lyrics. Some attempts at introducing the pop kreatif genre to Malaysia had various degree of success. For a brief period, the 1992 7th Anugerah Juara Lagu (AJL) competition would use pop kreatif as one of their genres. This led to Ziana Zain to briefly experiment with the pop kreatif genre on her song "Madah Berhelah" created by Saari Amri where she reached the position of Finalist at the 1992 7th AJL competition. Other runner ups include "Syakila" by Rahim Maarof, "Kekasih Awal dan Akhir" by Jamal Abdillah, and "Pada Syurga Di Wajahmu" by Nash Elias as the finalist. The AJL competition would change the pop kreatif genre as one of its categories to Ballad, likely due to the songs produced being similar to Ballad instead.

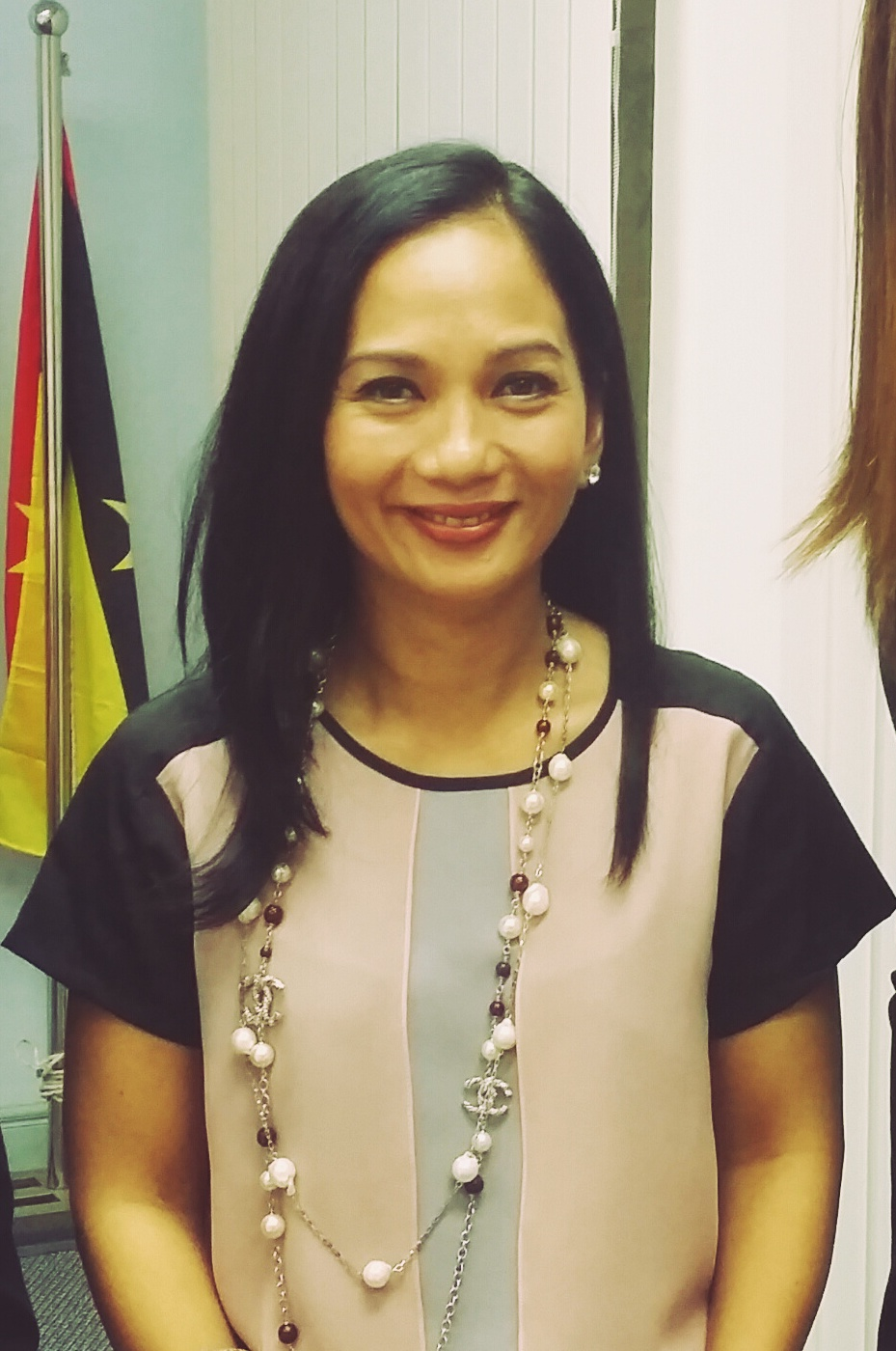
Sheila Majid, Malaysia's Queen of Jazz.

Thus during the 80's and 90's, Malaysia's public music taste had more interest within the traditional music genres such like Irama Malaysia ("Malaysian Melodies"), etnik kreatif ("creative ethnic [music]") or pop etnik ("ethnic pop") and even Indonesian Dangdut. Songs that were considered distinct or pop sounding rather than from mainstream music were more popularly labeled as Jez (English: Jazz) in Malaysia. This was likely attributed in part to Sheila Majid, as, according to her, the city pop-sounding music she brought to Malaysia, particularly her song Sinaran, was "considered quite different and ahead of its time." Aina Nur Sarah of British society magazine Tatler wrote, "when [Sheila's] music first reached the public, few knew what to make of it. It wasn’t Malay pop or rock; nor was it pure jazz," and the label subsequently stuck. Sheila Majid, popularly labeled Malaysia's "Queen of Jazz" for this reason, does not consider herself a jazz artist and instead insists that she is a pop artist. She once remarked that when she went to Japan, it was "[...] troubl[ing] telling music critics there that I don't sing jazz because they thought I was 'smart' enough to say I sing jazz."

Sheila Majid's second album, Emosi (1986), introduced a pioneering fusion of jazz and R&B, a genre that was innovative in Malaysia at the time. The album features the hit single "Antara Anyer dan Jakarta," written by Indonesian composer Oddie Agam. The album gained significant traction in Indonesia's burgeoning pop kreatif scene, which led her to try the Indonesian market. Sheila Majid collaborated with Indonesian songwriters and producers, particularly during the mid to late 1980s, influencing her musical styles. Notably, her 1988 album "Warna" was recorded in Jakarta and featured collaborations with Indonesian composer Indra Lesmana on tracks such as the title song "Warna" and "Takkan Sendiri (Untuk Ibu dan Ayah)." By the 1989, Sheila Majid had also recorded "Dia", a song written by Indonesian composer Randy Anwar and earlier popularised by Vina Panduwinata, whom Majid has described as her idol. Although originally associated with the Malaysian music scene, Sheila Majid was regarded as a pop kreatif singer during her peak popularity in the 1980s following the success of her albums "Warna", "Kasih", and "Emosi", which incorporated jazz influences.

Boosted by the popularity in Indonesia, "Sinaran" charted internationally, including in Japan. In 1989, a special Japanese edition of "Sinaran" was issued, featuring a new arrangement adapted to appeal to Japan's then-flourishing city pop market. Sheila Majid's popularity in Japan was further cemented when she performed at the 18th Tokyo Music Festival in 1989, showcasing "Sinaran" to a broader international audience. She would thus become the first Malaysian artist to perform at the Nippon Budokan Hall. The song reportedly reached the No. 1 spot on NHK Sapporo Radio Station's charts shortly after its release. It was also listed at number 38 on Radio Osaka's Carta Top 40. Sheila Majid also had once performed a cover of "Sparkle" by Tatsuro Yamashita during a joint concert for her "Legenda: The Concert" album in 1991. In a New Straits Times interview, Sheila Majid commented that the city pop genre was also "[...] not something foreign to me. It's where my musical roots began."

Sheila Majid's "Sinaran" (1986)
The first track from Emosi, re-recorded in Japan. To the Living History project, the album had "introduced a unique blend of pop, jazz, and R&B to local audiences — at a time when the genre was relatively unknown in Malaysia."

Other artist within the Malaysian 80's pop/Jez scene also include Fairuz Hussein, Mazlan Hamzah, and Freedom/Seha. Fairuz Hussein also worked with Indonesian singers and composers, including Harry Sabar and Elfa Secioria. Parts of her song "Kali Pertama" were recorded in Jakarta, while her first album included "Lagu Cinta," composed/arranged by Indonesian musician Elfa Secioria, with Elfa's Singers contributing backing vocals. Kamsah Sirat of Berita Harian argued that, unlike Sheila Majid, her popularity in Indonesia was primarily through the Indonesian film industry. In particular was through the film, Catatan Si Boy II, where she was entrusted to the making of its theme song. In Batam, in close proximity with Singapore, both her and Sheila Majid's song were reported to be popular. Fairuz also collaborated with the Indonesian jazz-fusion band Indonesia 6, recording "Doo De Doo Daa" and "Bawalah Daku". She later duetted with pop kreatif singer Harvey Malaiholo and covered a rendition of Fariz's RM's "Night in Barcelona". Fairuz Hussein would also perform at the 19th Tokyo Music Festival on 30 May 1990 at Nakano Sunplaza, Tokyo, by singing "Samba Ria", taken from her self-titled second album. The second album was also released in Indonesia and included songs by Indonesian songwriters, including "Api Cinta" by James F. Sundah and "Cuba Lagi" by Billy J. Budiarjo." Although not reaching to the similar heights of Sheila Majid, Fairuz would be known to become the first Southeast Asian singer to issue an album on compact disc, and that a copy of the CD was subsequently placed in Malaysia's National Museum.

Akin to Indonesia, rock kapak became mainstream in Malaysia and Singapore. Indonesian dangdut also regained popularity in Malaysia by the mid-1990s to early 2000s after a period of decline in the early 80s', with its revival closely associated with Amelina’s commercial success. However, Malaysian popular music was said to have largely declined amid the spread of illegal downloading on the internet. According to Recording Industry Association of Malaysia (IFPI), a non-profit music organization, total industry revenue dropped from roughly RM200 million per year in the late 1990s down to RM87 million in 2006. Nearly 60%-70% of sales for CDs were illegal copies and members of IFPI to lose RM300 million in sales each year. Such was due to online piracy and illegal file-swapping industry in Malaysia for eroding profits. Speaking to the BBC, a representative of IFPI once remarked, "It is a sad fact there are relatively few new artists emerging over the last five years in the local music scene, simply because the recording companies are having a tough time competing with the pirates." Sheila Majid would stop releasing new songs during the 2000s citing widespread music piracy, explaining, "We 'give' but people 'keep taking'. I'm thinking, how are we going to make a profit?". Sheila Majid also criticised the state of local Malaysian pop, arguing that Malaysian listeners should have supported it "like we did in the late 80s", when, in her view, "our music was very good." In 2013, referring to the state of Malaysian pop music and rampant piracy, she warned that "music in Malaysia does not receive the respect it deserves" and that "one day, the Malaysian music industry will die".

In 2024, Sheila Majid collaborated with the Indonesian DJ duo Diskoria in a concert in Kuala Lumpur, blending her music with Indonesian disco and funk influences. Amid the resurgence of pop kreatif and city pop-inspired trends, Sheila Majid has attracted renewed interest among younger Malaysian listeners. Commenting on her association with the city pop label, she remarked: "Suddenly, I’m hip again! [...] I’m trending!"

=== In the Philippines ===
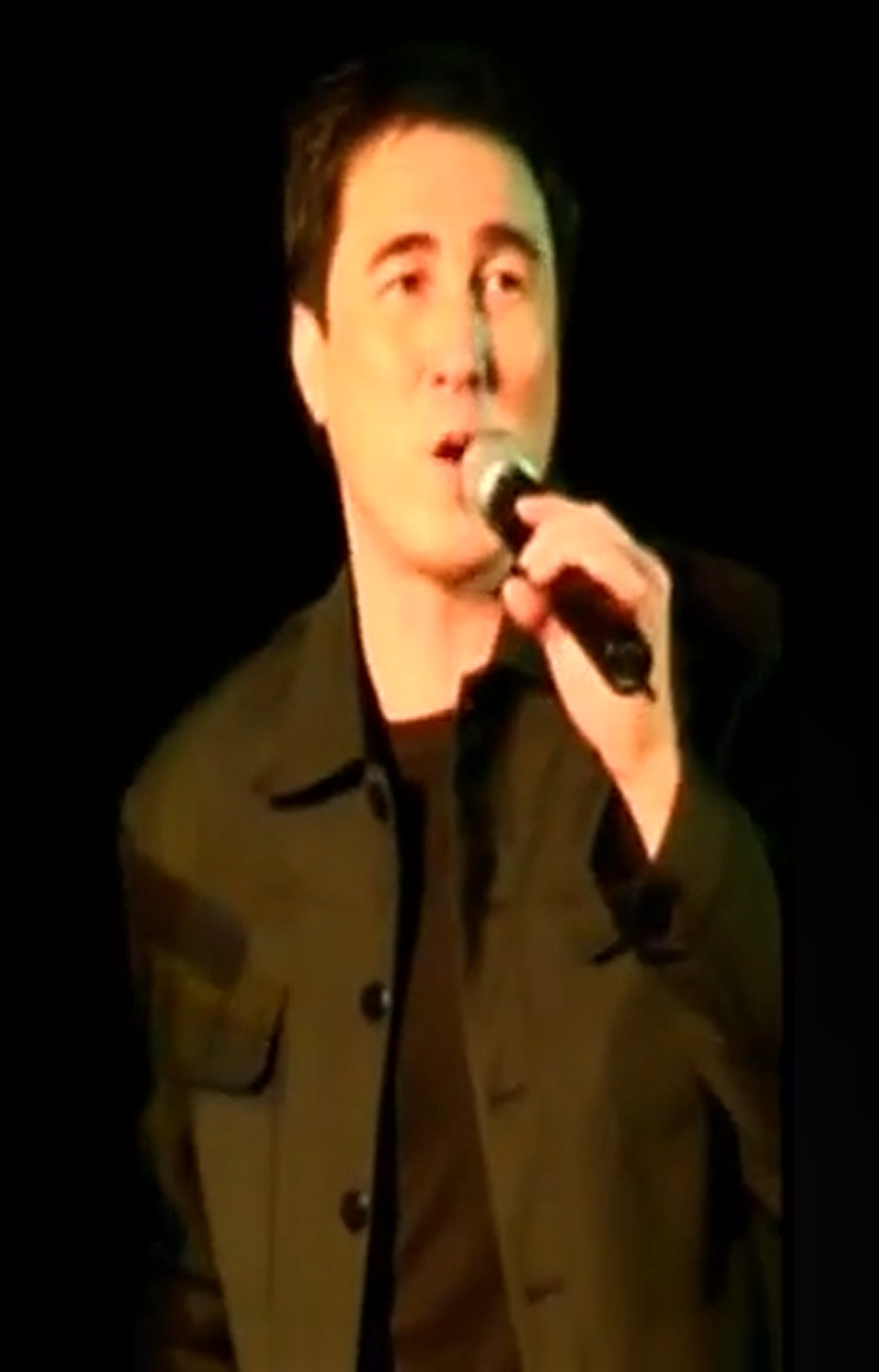
Filipino singer Gino Padilla, who recorded "Gusto Kita", a Tagalog adaptation of Utha Likumahuwa's "Sesaat Kau Hadir".

Indonesian Pop kreatif had some transmission to the Philippines as early as 1979, when Filipino singer Victor Wood shipped a cassette containing Indonesian songs from pop kreatif artists such as Achmad Albar, Chrisye, Jockie Soerjoprajogo, and Minggus Tahitoe. Such was received with mixed reactions, as some artists believed that it constituted copyright infringement, while others were proud that the music was being propagated abroad. Victor Wood himself had helped by pop kreatif songwriter James F. Sundah, including the translation work of Chrisye's song "Lilin-Lilin Kecil" to the Filipino audience. Victor Wood's songs were also popular in Indonesia during the 1970s.

Pop kreatif was also represented at the 1989 ASEAN Popular Song Festival in Manila, where several Indonesian performers associated with the genre received awards. Elfa's Singers' "Kau Kekasihku" won "Best Performer" and second-place "Best Song" of the ASEAN Pop Song Festival, while Yana Julio was named runner-up. Utha Likumahuwa placed second in the "Best Performer" category, and his song "Sesaat Kau Hadir", written by Budi Bachtiar and Aldino, was selected as "Best Song". OPM songwriter Snaffu Rigor later heard the song and considered it "an Indonesian tune so good" that he translated it into Tagalog. The resulting adaptation was co-written with OPM singer Gino Padilla under the title "Gusto Kita". The song would become popular in the Philippines and be covered by various artists such like Ronnie Liang (which would be his "second hit song"); Daniel Padilla, Khalil Ramos, and Enrique Gil (under Princess and I soundtrack); Angeline Quinto; and Kelvin Miranda & Ally Gonzales (as a duet).

== See also ==
- List of pop kreatif artists
- Jazz Goes To Campus – oldest jazz fusion concert in Indonesia created by pop kreatif veteran Candra Darusman

== Suggested listening ==
- Indonesia's Top 10 '89 (Team Records, cassette compilation, 1989)
- Mereka Menyebutnya... Pop Kreatif (Aquarius IND., 12-track compilation, 1990)
