= List of pop kreatif artists =

The following is a list of artists and bands associated with Pop kreatif (also referred to as Indonesian City Pop), a music genre that gained prominence during the late 1970s and 1980s. While not all listed were exclusively Pop kreatif artists, they contributed to the genre's development and popularity.

Groups and artists with aliases are listed alphabetically by the first letter of their name, while individual artists are listed by their surname.

- AB Three (band)
- Andi Meriem Matalatta
- Asrie
- Bening (band)
- Candra Darusman
- Chaseiro
- Christ Kayhatu
- Chrisye
- Cici Sumiati
- Deddy Dhukun
- Dian Pramana Poetra
- Dodo Zakaria
- Dwen (Brunei)
- Elly Sunarya
- Elfa Secioria
- Elfa's Singer (formerly, 80's)
- Emilie S. Praja
- Eramono Soekaryo
- Fairuz Hussein (Malaysia)
- Fariz RM
- Guruh Soekarnoputra
- Hentriesa & Wieke Gur Salameh
- Imaniar
- Ina Rawie
- James F Sundah
- January Christy
- Katara Singers (band)
- K3S
- Kiki Maria
- Luluk Purwanto
- Lydia Kandou
- Malyda
- Modulus Band
- Mus Mujiono
- Neno Warisman
- Nia Zulkarnaen
- Nourma Yunita
- Pretty Sisters (band)
- Purnomo Sikas
- Rafika Duri
- Rina Megasari
- RSD (Rida Sita Dewi)
- Rumpies (band)
- Ryan Kyoto
- Sheila Majid (Malaysia)
- Tika Bisono
- Titi DJ (formerly, 80's)
- Tito Soemarsono
- Transs
- Utha Likumahuwa
- Vina Panduwinata
- Wiwiek Lismani
- Yopie Latul
- 2D
