= Indonesia 6 =

Indonesian jazz fusion band

- Indonesia 6 band members (1989)

Background information
- Origin: Indonesia
- Genres: Indonesian pop; pop kreatif; jazz fusion; Latin; folk
- Years active: 1984–1990
- Label: Team
- Spinoffs: Kahitna
- Past members: Hentriesa Yulmedia; Yani Danuwijaya; Desi Arnaz Lahat; Iwan Wiradz; Bubi Iradiadi; Yovie Widianto

Indonesia 6 (Indonesian: Indonesia Enam; Japanese: インドネシア・アナム, romanized: Indonesia Anam) was a jazz fusion band from Indonesia, active primarily in the late 1980s. The group was notable for its contributions to the Indonesian music scene and for being an early platform for musician Yovie Widianto and as precursor to the formation of the well-known band Kahitna. The band originated from earlier formations known as Coops Rhythm Section and Rooster, which eventually evolved into Indonesia 6. The lineup included Yovie Widianto on keyboards, Iwan Wiradz, Desi Arnaz, Hentriesa, Bubi Iradiadi, and Yani Danuwijaya.

== Formation ==
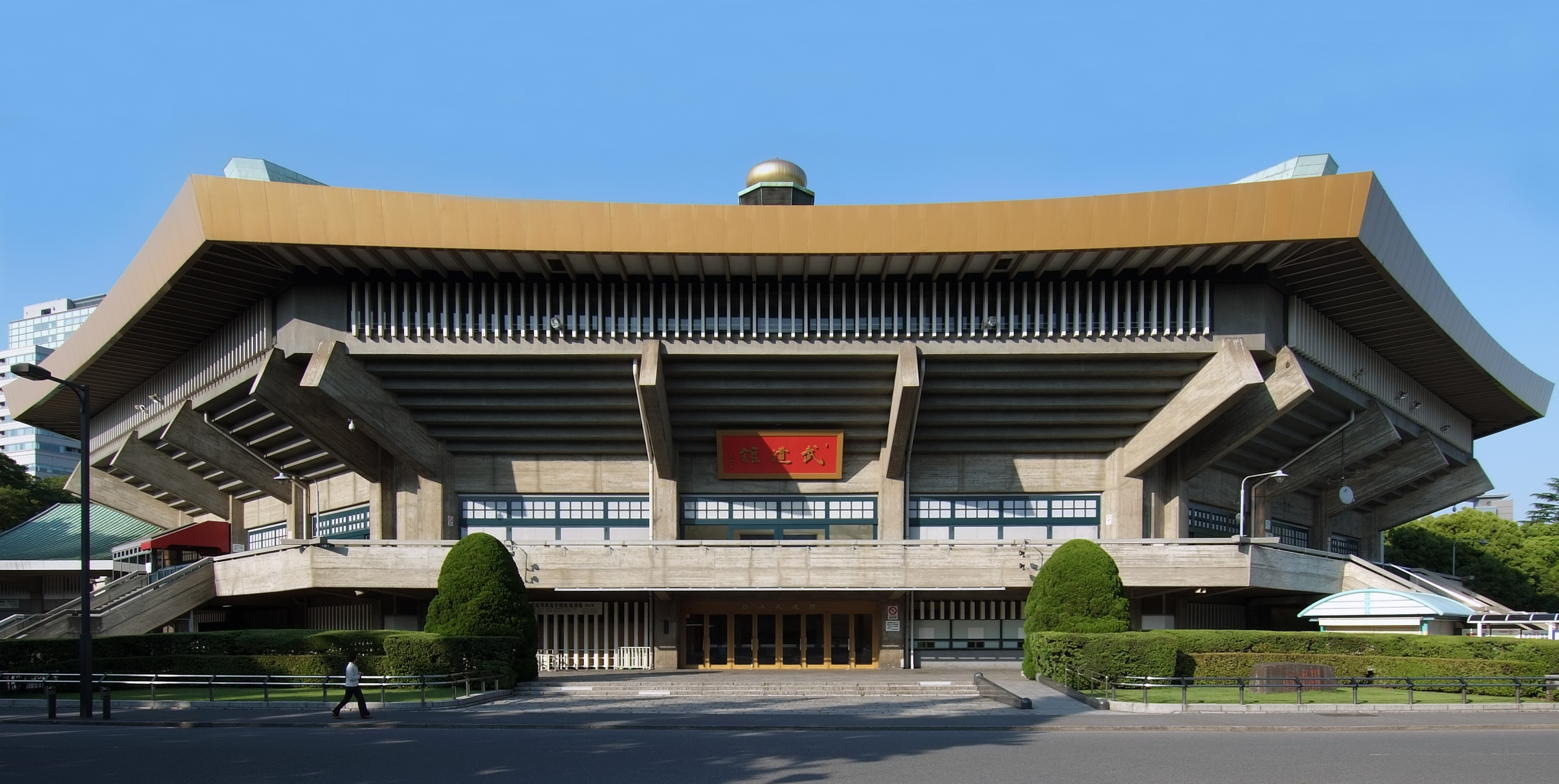
Nippon Budokan Hall (日本武道館) in Tokyo, Japan, where the group achieved breakthrough success and popularity

In 1987, Indonesia 6 gained national recognition by participating in the World Band Explosion, also known as the Yamaha Light Music Contest, held at Budokan Hall in Tokyo. Indonesia 6, a jazz-fusion band formed in 1984, gained international recognition after their performance at the International Light Music Contest 1987 in Tokyo, where they won Best Keyboard Player and Best Bassist awards. The International Light Music Contest 1987 were judged by Issei Noro of Casiopea (JP), Nathan East (USA), Haruomi Hosono of Yellow Magic Orchestra (JP), John Robinson (USA), Hideo Yamaki (JP), Akira Inoue (JP), Masaki Ueda (JP), and Ryo Asuka (JP). Their performance of "All the Things You Are", rearranged into a samba rhythm with Latin influence, stood out for its complex improvisations and fusion elements reminiscent of bands like Casiopea, Spyro Gyra, and Level 42. The band originally performed under the name Kahitna, with all members being students of Elfa Music Studio in Bandung. The group later adopted the name Indonesia 6 to align with their participation in the Light Music Contest, referencing the band's six-member lineup. The members included:

- Hentriesa Yulmedia (drums)
- Yani Danuwijaya (keyboards; Best Keyboard Player Award)
- Desi Arnaz Lahat (bass; Best Bassist Award)
- Iwan Wiradz (percussion)
- Bubi Iradiadi (keyboards)
- Yovie Widianto (keyboards)

The band represented Indonesia and Asia alongside participants from 22 groups across 11 countries, including Japan. 6,500 bands from Japan and 5,500 bands from other countries had originally competed for the opportunity to perform in Tokyo. The group's music was primarily influenced by Latin jazz, but they incorporated Indonesian ethnic elements for international appeal. Elfa Secioria, their mentor and musical director, emphasized the band's fusion style that blended traditional Indonesian sounds with Latin percussion and modern jazz. Yani Danuwijaya, the youngest member at 15 years old, had already gained international recognition through the Junior Original Concert (JOC) in Tokyo and Osaka and had performed for UNICEF and at the United Nations Headquarters in New York. Despite her classical training, Yani transitioned into jazz with guidance from Tamam Hussein, focusing on developing her jazz improvisation skills.

== Discography ==
Indonesia 6

Studio album by Indonesia 6
- Released: July 1989
- Recorded: 1988–1989
- Genre: Jazz fusion; pop kreatif; Latin
- Label: Team
- Producer: Jan Djuhana

Singles from Indonesia 6
- 1. "Fatamorgana" Released: 1988

The band's self-titled debut studio album was released in 1989 under Team Records, shortly after their success in Tokyo, showcasing their Latin jazz style with a strong fusion influence and tracks like "Fatamorgana", which drew direct inspiration from Casiopea and Shakatak. The album featured collaborations with prominent artists such as Yana Julio, Harvey Malaihollo, Ferina Widodo, Lita Zen and Malaysian singer Fairuz Hussein.

"Fatamorgana" from Indonesia 6 (1988)
Hear the incorporation of Latin jazz and Indonesian folk instruments in the ensemble, with notable direct inspiration from Casiopea

=== Track listing ===
Side A
No.	Title	Lyrics	Length
1.	"Monica"	Hentriesa Yulmedia, Ferina	3:55
2.	"Speed Driver"	Yovie Widianto	4:26
3.	"Bawalah Daku"	Elfa Secioria, Wieke Gur	4:20
4.	"Crystal"	Yovie Widianto	4:35
5.	"Crazy Love"	Bubby Iradiadi, Inggrid, Yovie Widianto	3:21
6.	"Janji"	Yani Danuwijaya, Iwan Wiradz, Dieh Wiradz	3:10

Side B
No.	Title	Lyrics	Length
7.	"Fatamorgana"	Yani Danuwijaya, Ferina	3:55
8.	"Winners Cup"	Yovie Widianto	4:46
9.	"Doo Dee Doo Da (Getaran Cinta)"	Desi Arnaz Lahat, Ferina	3:21
10.	"Matahari"	Indonesia 6	7:00
11.	"Asa"	Iwan Wiradz	3:46

=== Singles ===
- Indonesia's Top 10 '89 (1989) - Um Samba

== Legacy ==
While Indonesia 6 showed immense promise, the band members were still students with academic aspirations beyond music. Yani planned to continue his education, while Desi aimed for a degree in economics. Hentriesa, however, declared his full commitment to music. Thus led to the disbandment of Indonesia 6 after their debut album. The second album of Indonesia 6 was ultimately never released due to unspecified reasons. One of the songs from the unreleased album, titled "Pinocchio", was later repurposed and released in 1998 as part of Kahitna's album Sampai Nanti. Whilst was short-lived, the members continued to influence the Indonesian music industry. Notably, Yovie Widianto went on to form Kahitna in 1986 as a successor of the group, achieving significant success in the Indonesian pop and jazz scenes.

In 2017, to commemorate the 30th anniversary of their performance in Tokyo, Indonesia 6 reunited for a nostalgic concert, named "The History of Victory", at the Jakarta Hard Rock Cafe. The event celebrated their past achievements and contributions to Indonesian music. Including their performance of "All the Things You Are" and their unreleased track rendition of "Pinocchio".
