= Yopie Latul =

Indonesian singer (1955–2020)

- Born: 7 September 1955; Ambon, Maluku, Indonesia
- Died: 9 September 2020 (aged 65); Cibinong, Bogor, Jawa Barat, Indonesia
- Genres: Dance; House; Pop; Funk/soul; Pop Kreatif
- Occupation: Singer
- Years active: 1982–2020
- Labels: JK Records; Pelita Utama; Akurama Records; KRI Record; HP Records; Musica Studios

Yopie Latul (7 September 1955 – 9 September 2020) was an Indonesian singer.

== Career ==
Latul was born in Ambon. He started his singing career in 1982, becoming known to the public after releasing his single titled "Ayun Langkahmu" by Elfa Secioria and Wieke Gur in 1986. In addition, Latul was also known for his song "Kembalikan Baliku" created by Guruh Soekarnoputra, which he performed at the 1987 Indonesian Popular Song Festival with the Swara Mahardhika choir.

Latul was also famous for the popular ethnic dance song "Poco-poco" (1995), for which he won the 2001 Indonesian Music Award in the category of Best Disco Singer/House Music/Rap/Dance Music.

== Death ==
Death Reason In early September 2020 : Latul tested positive for COVID-19 during the COVID-19 pandemic in Indonesia after attending an Independence Day event in Bogor with his band "Sound of Curly"; two of his band members also tested positive. He was initially asymptomatic, but on 7 September he was rushed to the Sentra Medika Hospital in Cibinong, West Java. He died two days later, aged 65, two days after his birthday. He was buried in the Ranggon public cemetery in East Jakarta, in accordance with local health and safety protocols for the burial of COVID-19 victims.

== Discography ==
=== Solo albums ===
- Poco Poco (2000)
- The Best of Yopie Latul (1998)
- Tiada Berdaya (1994)
- Remix Hitam tapi Manis (1994)
- Kusesali (1994)
- Simalakama II (1993)
- Hey Gadis (1991)
- O Sussy Sayang (1989)
- Dansa Gepe-Gepe (1984)
- Jopie Latul – Ambon Jazz Rock (1982)

=== Collaborations/featuring ===
- OST Bella Vista (1994, with the song "Ibunda")
- First Winner of the Indonesian Popular Song Festival 1989–1990 (1990; singing the song "Bila" with Trie Utami)
- Jangan Menambah Dosa (1989, singing the song "Daripada-Daripada" with Mus Mujiono & Deddy Dhukun and "Angan Pesona")
- Album Cinta Pop Kreatif (1989; singing the song "Ketika Cinta Bersatu")
- Kharisma Indonesia 2 (1989; singing the song "Dea Deo" with Ancha Haiz)
- Duet Plus (1988, singing the song "Jumpa Lagi" with Andi Meriem Matalatta)
- Development Songwriting Competition 1987 (1987; with the song "Bersatulah")
- Indonesian Popular Song Festival 1987 (1987; with the song "Kembalikan Baliku")
- Indonesian Popular Song Festival 1986 (1986; with the song "Ayun Langkahmu")
- Suara Persaudaraan (1985; singing the song "Perdamaian" with Vina Panduwinata and Utha Likumahuwa)
- Album Pesta, Vol. 2 (2017; singing "Hioko Tobelo II" with Cavin Sahilatua and MCP Sysilia)
