= Sakura (Fariz RM album) =

Studio album by Fariz RM
- Released: February 1980
- Studios: Gelora Seni, Jakarta
- Genres: Pop kreatif; city pop; teen pop; disco; funk; R&B
- Length: 52:22 (cassette version); 32:00 (vinyl version)
- Label: Akurama
- Producer: Fariz RM

Fariz RM chronology
| Sakura (1980) | Selangkah ke Seberang (1980) |

Record plate cover
- "Sakura" cover intended as a radio promo

Sakura is the debut album by musician Fariz RM, released in 1980 under the Akurama Records label. The album features Fariz performing all the instruments using an overdubbing system. The album was a major success and catapulted Fariz RM's name as a musician. In 2007, the album was listed among the 150 Best Indonesian Albums of All Time by Rolling Stone Indonesia magazine.

== Background ==
Fariz RM's early influence from David Bowie is clearly reflected in the highly descriptive, documentary-style lyrics. The songs on this album are rich in elements of ballad, romance, and melancholy, which would become hallmarks of Fariz RM's style, and are delivered in a mix of disco and R&B genres, relying heavily on drum machines, keyboards, and synthesizers. After the repeated delay of the album Selangkah ke Seberang, Chrisye attempted to circulate the album's master cassette to various parties to gain attention. This caught the interest of Diwandida Film, which was developing a screenplay for a romance film that would eventually be titled Sakura dalam Pelukan. Under the direction of filmmaker Fritz G. Schadt, Fariz RM wrote a song titled "Sakura", which became the theme song for the film, featuring Grace Simon as the lead vocalist. At Grace Simon's urging, Fariz also performed "Sakura" himself, which led to the creation of a new album of the same name.

Sakura was recorded at Gelora Seni Studio in Jakarta using the overdubbing technique. Fariz RM provided lead vocals and performed all instruments, including string instruments, bass, drums, guitar, brass instruments, keyboards, synthesizers, percussion, and electric piano. He composed and arranged all the songs (some co-written with Anton Panggabean and Jimmy Paais), including new arrangements of three songs from the previous album: "Selangkah ke Seberang", "Mega Bhuana", and "Cermin Noda". Anita Carolina Mohede performed duets on three tracks: "Nada Cinta", "Mega Bhuana", and "Malam Kesembilan". A Japanese-language narration in the track "Sakura" was provided by Mrs. Herawati.

In producing the album, Fariz experimented with various approaches, drawing inspiration from elements of contemporary pop music and disco that were popular at the time. He also incorporated influences from the falsetto vocal technique and brass instrumentation, inspired respectively by the musical styles of the Bee Gees and Earth, Wind & Fire.

== Reception ==
The album achieved great success and elevated his reputation both as a musician and a singer. Songs such as "Sakura", "Selangkah ke Seberang", and "(Belenggu) Perjalanan" became some of his most popular works and have been rearranged and covered by various artists.

The album Sakura was ranked 17th in the list of the "150 Best Indonesian Albums" by Rolling Stone Indonesia magazine, published in issue No. 32 in December 2007. Two songs from the album—"Sakura" and "Selangkah ke Seberang"—were ranked 9th and 121st, respectively, in the list of "150 Best Indonesian Songs", published in issue No. 56 in December 2009 by the same magazine.

== Track listing ==
Sisi A
| No. | Title | Lyrics | Length |
|---|---|---|---|
| 1. | "Sakura" | Fariz RM, Jimmy Paais | 6:22 |
| 2. | "Selangkah ke Seberang" | Fariz RM | 6:32 |
| 3. | "(Belenggu) Perjalanan" | Fariz RM, Jimmy Paais | 5:04 |
| 4. | "Semusim" | Fariz RM, Jimmy Paais | 4:58 |
| 5. | "Nada Cinta" | Fariz RM, Jimmy Paais | 4:36 |

Sisi B
| No. | Title | Lyrics | Length |
|---|---|---|---|
| 6. | "Mega Bhuana" | Fariz RM, Anton Panggabean | 4:28 |
| 7. | "Suasana (Yang Ada)" | Fariz RM, Jimmy Paais | 6:13 |
| 8. | "Cermin Noda" | Fariz RM, Anton Panggabean | 5:53 |
| 9. | "Malam Kesembilan" | Fariz RM, Jimmy Paais | 8:16 |
| Total length: | | | 52:22 |

Edisi promo radio
| No. | Title | Lyrics | Length |
|---|---|---|---|
| 1. | "Sakura" | Fariz RM, Jimmy Paais | 6:22 |
| 2. | "(Belenggu) Perjalanan" | Fariz RM, Jimmy Paais | 5:04 |
| 3. | "Selangkah ke Seberang" | Fariz RM | 6:32 |
| 4. | "Mega Bhuana" | Fariz RM, Anton Panggabean | 4:28 |
| 5. | "Nada Cinta" | Fariz RM, Jimmy Paais | 4:36 |
| 6. | "Semusim" | Fariz RM, Jimmy Paais | 4:58 |
| Total length: | | | 32:00 |

=== Notes ===
- In the 1992 cassette re-release and the 2020 vinyl, the duration of the song "Selangkah ke Seberang" is shortened to 4:36.

== Personnel ==
- Fariz RM – Main Vocalist, player of all instruments

=== Additional personnel ===
- Wibi – percussion on "Cermin Noda" and "Ninth Night"
- Anita Carolina Mohede – vocals on "Nada Cinta", "Mega Bhuana" and "Ninth Night"
- Mrs. Herawati – background vocals on the song "Sakura"

=== Production ===
- Boy Delihaye – sound engineer
- Dannes Item – sound engineer

== Release history ==
| Country | Date | Label | Format | Catalogue number |
|---|---|---|---|---|
| Indonesia | 1980 | Akurama | Cassette | |
| Indonesia | 1980 | Akurama | Vinyl record | |
| Indonesia | 1992 | Akurama | Cassette | |
| Indonesia | 22 January 2020 | Hitam Manis | Digital platform | |
| Indonesia | 11 December 2020 | Musica, Hitam Manis | Vinyl record | MPH0035T |
