= Pop melankolis =

Subgenre of Indonesian pop music from the 1960s

- 1989 album cover of a pop melankolis compilation tape, featuring various pop artists from the genre.
- Other names: Pop manis, pop cengeng, lagu cengeng
- Stylistic origins: Traditional pop; country; blue-eyed soul
- Cultural origins: 1960s-1980s, Indonesia
- Derivative forms: Congdut

Other topics
- Indo pop; pop kreatif

Pop melankolis (English: melancholic pop), also known as pop manis (sweet pop) and pejoratively as pop cengeng or lagu cengeng (weepy pop or weepy song), is a subgenre of Indo pop originated in the 1960s and reached its peak popularity in the 1980s, characterized by its slow tempo, sentimental themes and influences from 1950s American traditional pop, incorporating elementary chord progressions. This subgenre was briefly banned from being broadcast on TVRI in 1988 by Harmoko, Indonesia's then Minister of Information.

== Definition ==
The term "pop melankolis" was coined by Indonesian songwriter Rinto Harahap to describe his style of music, which was described as "cengeng" (whiny or weepy) by Harmoko. It is also known as "pop manis" (sweet pop).

The music of pop melankolis is characterized by elementary chord progressions harkening back to American traditional pop from the 1950s-1960s, as heard in songs like "Unchained Melody", which follows the progression of C major – A minor – F major – G major, sometimes with additional variations like E minor or D minor. This structure gives pop melankolis its signature sentimental and sorrowful feel, making songs in this genre easily recognizable for their evocative and poignant mood. Instruments used include guitars, keyboards and drums, and often include synthesizers especially in the 1980s.

While the music may be more sophisticated or up-to-date in comparison to traditional pop, the singing style remains deeply influenced by it. Philip Yampolsky describes the singing as "wispy, disembodied, without tension or defiance, without edges". The lyrical subject of pop melankolis varies, some religious, but most are about love and heartbreak, and often are straight-ahead. Television performances and music videos of pop melankolis songs often feature the artists weeping or crying while performing. Answer songs, a staple of country music in the 1950s, was also a common trend in this subgenre.

== Musical origin ==
The origin of pop melankolis can be traced back to the 1963 country ballad "Patah Hati" by Rachmat Kartolo, which gained popularity after Sukarno banned rock and roll music which he dubbed "ngak-ngik-ngok". According to music critic Remy Sylado, writing in 1977, this and other songs by Kartolo became a monumental change in Indonesian pop music, which became characterized by "crying and weeping because of broken heart".

Following the success of "Patah Hati", many rock and roll bands in the 1960s and 1970s such as Koes Plus, Panbers, and The Mercy's began moving towards playing pop melankolis music. Many songwriters and composers who would be influential to the genre originated from these bands, such as Rinto Harahap (who was part of the band The Mercy's), Pance Pondaag (who was part of the band Peace), and Deddy Dores (who was part of the band God Bless). Pop singers would later began releasing similar sentimental songs, such as Broery Pesulima and Titiek Puspa.

=== Lolypop and JK Records ===
A key figure in this subgenre is Rinto Harahap of The Mercy's. Rinto has composed over 500 songs in his lifetime, most of which are in this subgenre. After The Mercy's disbanded, Rinto alongside his brother Erwin Harahap formed the record label Lolypop. The label became instrumental in launching the careers of several artists associated with pop melankolis, including Diana Nasution, Rita Butar Butar, and Betharia Sonatha. Iis Sugianto, a singer from the pop kreatif subgenre under the label Jackson Record's, was approached by Rinto. Sugianto would release her third album in 1979 under Lolypop, with the song "Jangan Sakiti Hatinya" becoming a huge hit, commencing the rise of pop melankolis in the 1980s.

Another important label in this subgenre is JK Records, which specialized in pop melankolis releases. This label launched the careers of various other artists associated with the subgenre, including Dian Piesesha, Meriam Bellina, and Chintami Atmanagara.

== Popularity ==
"Tak Ingin Sendiri" by Dian Piesesha (1984)
A track from Dian Piesesha's Tak Ingin Sendiri, features soft keyboard melodies, string, and restrained percussion, creating a melancholic atmosphere that complements the emotive vocals.

The subgenre would reach its peak popularity in the 1980s. Prominent composers in this subgenre included Rinto Harahap, Pance Pondaag and Obbie Messakh. Rinto is often considered as this genre's "king". Other prominent composers include A. Riyanto, Deddy Dores, Pompi, and Youngky RM. Popular singers included Dian Piesesha (whose album Tak Ingin Sendiri sold over 2 million copies), Nia Daniaty, Iis Sugianto, Iis Sugiarti, Nani Sugianto, and Betharia Sonatha (whose album Hati yang Luka became a major hit in 1988).

Pop melankolis, alongside dangdut, became popular with the lower middle-class, in contrast to the upper middle-class who mostly prefer pop kreatif.

=== "Hati yang Luka", Harmoko, and genre ban on TVRI ===
On January 11, 1988, the song "Hati yang Luka", written by Obbie Messakh and performed by Betharia Sonatha, was released. The lyrical content was different from other pop melankolis songs, as it is from the perspective of a married woman who is abused by her husband. The song became very popular, selling over 1 million copies, and various covers and answer songs were made. Later that year, on TVRI's birthday, pop melankolis was officially banned from airing on TVRI, Indonesia's only television network at the time, by Harmoko, the then Minister of Information. The decision came after he listened to the aforementioned "Hati Yang Luka". Disturbed by the song's emotional delivery, where Betharia often sang while crying, Harmoko immediately ordered a ban on what he called "pop cengeng" (whiny pop). He argued that such songs discouraged a strong work ethic and were incompatible with the government's vision for national development. Harmoko criticized TVRI's programming, which he claimed was saturated with sorrowful themes of heartbreak and despair, deeming them unfit for fostering a motivated and productive society. Some sources suggest that President Suharto himself disliked the song. The ban devastated the pop melankolis industry, leaving many artists financially ruined and ultimately leading to the decline of the once-dominant subgenre.

=== Decline, brief resurgence and later influence ===
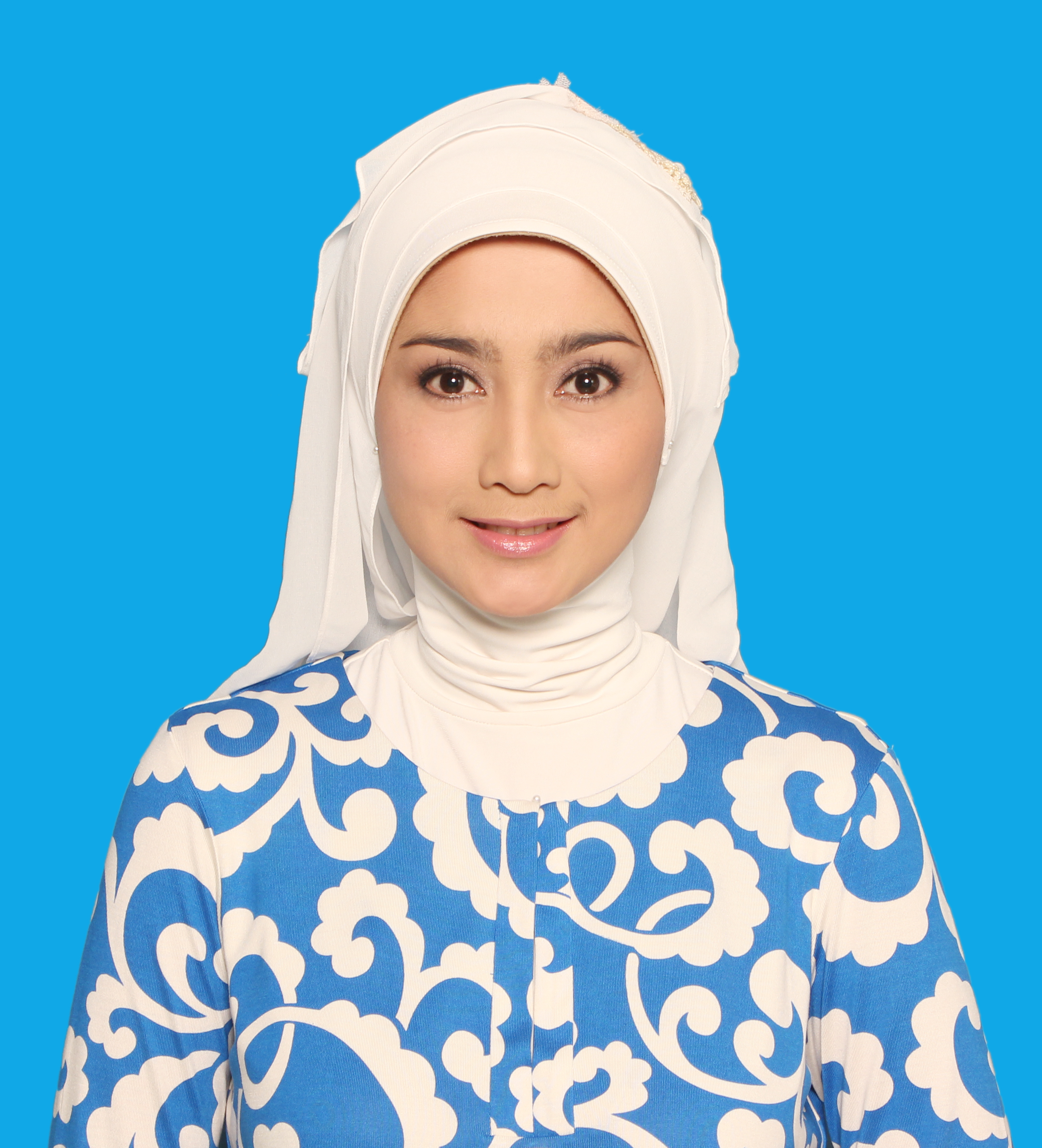
Actress and singer Desy Ratnasari became a prominent figure in pop melankolis' revival in the mid-1990s.

The changing landscape of the Indonesian music scene, driven by the ban on pop melankolis on TVRI, as well as the rising popularity of pop kreatif, dangdut, and Malaysian rock kapak (known as slow rock in Indonesia), led to shifts in the industry. Some pop melankolis artists would move to pop kreatif, such as Chintami Atmanagara and Jayanthi Mandasari, while others such as Obbie Messakh would move to dangdut and finding success in this genre, launching the career of dangdut singer Meggy Z. Deddy Dores would return into making rock music, but it remained heavily influenced by pop melankolis, as evident in the songs of rock singer Nike Ardilla, most of which were written by him. Betharia Sonatha would continue releasing songs in this genre despite the ban, but the music arrangement would gradually diverge from the genre, as evidenced by her later songs such as "Tak Mungkin Lagi".

Despite the rise of pop kreatif as well as Malaysian-influenced slow rock following the ban of pop melankolis in 1988, the genre would experience a resurgence in the mid-1990s, beginning in 1993 with Dewi Yull's "Kau Bukan Dirimu", written by Amin Ivo's. Amin also played a key role in reviving the careers of pop artists previously associated with the genre, such as Broery, Iis Sugianto, and Rafika Duri. Another significant figure in this resurgence was actress Desy Ratnasari, who became popular as a singer with pop melankolis-styled songs such as "Tenda Biru" and "Sampai Hati". However, the revival was short-lived, and by the late 1990s, the genre had virtually disappeared.

The congdut fusion genre of kroncong and dangdut, popularized by Didi Kempot and other artists such as Denny Caknan, was influenced by pop melankolis and in particular the songs of Rinto Harahap, acquiring its characteristic chord progressions and sentimental themes, and thus is often seen as its successor. Sentimental themes and slow tempo remained popular in wider Indo pop music.
