= Widianto =

Widianto is a surname. Notable people with the surname include:

- Nova Widianto
- Yovie Widianto
- Riky Widianto
