= Kahitna =

Indonesian pop band

- Origin: Bandung, Indonesia
- Genres: Pop; jazz; jazz fusion; smooth jazz; pop kreatif; funk; Indo pop
- Years active: 1986–present
- Labels: Musica
- Spinoff of: Indonesia 6
- Members: Yovie Widianto; Bambang Purwono; Hedi Yunus; Mario Ginanjar; Dody Isniani; Harry Suhardiman; Budiana Nugraha; Andrie Bayuajie
- Past members: Ronni Waluya; Carlo Saba

Kahitna (pronounced [kaˈhɪtna]), is a music group from Bandung, Indonesia. It was formed in 1986 and founded by Yovie Widianto. Although most of the songs contain love themes in the lyrics, the group is also well known to be able to combine elements of other music genres such as jazz, pop, fusion, Latin and even traditional music. The band adopted its name from a former jazz fusion group that Yovie Widianto was part of during his high school years, which changed its name to Indonesia 6 to compete in Japan.

== Members ==
Current members
- Yovie Widianto – piano, keyboard (1986–present)
- Bambang Purwono – keyboard, backing vocal (1986–present)
- Hedi Yunus – vocal (1986–present)
- Mario Ginanjar – vocal (2003–present)
- Dody Isniani – bass, acoustic guitar (1986–present)
- Andrie Bayuadjie – lead guitar, acoustic guitar (1986–present)
- Budiana Nugraha – drummer (1986–present)
- Harry Sudirman – percussion (1986–present)

Past members

- Ronni Waluya – vocal (1986–1995)
- Carlo Saba – vocal (1986–2023; died 2023)

Timeline

== Discography ==
Studio Albums

- "Cerita Cinta" (1994)
- "Cantik" (1996)
- "Sampai Nanti" (1998)
- "Permaisuriku" (2000)
- "Cinta Sudah Lewat" (2002)
- "Soulmate" (2006)
- "Lebih Dari Sekedar Cantik" (2010)
- "Rahasia Cinta" (2016)

Compilations

- "The Best of Kahitna" (2003)
- "Cerita Cinta: 25 Tahun Kahitna" (2011)

== See also ==
- Indonesia 6
- Yovie & Nuno
- Pradikta Wicaksono
