= Avi Naif =

Indonesian model (1970–2006)

Jeanny Stavia (18 December 1970 – 19 January 2006), known professionally as Avi Naif, was an Indonesian model. Her professional name came from appearing in a music video by Naif.

== Early life and career ==
Avi was born on 18 December 1970. Her mother's name was Marina Suwito. She later came out as a transgender woman, and was crowned Transgender Queen of Indonesia in 1997. She starred in the music video for Naif's song "Posesif", off of their 2000 album Jangan Terlalu Naif. The song itself was named to Rolling Stone Indonesia's 150 Greatest Indonesian Albums of All Time. The role also earned her the Best Video Clip Model award from MTV in 2001.

== Personal life ==
In 2004, Avi was arrested for possession of cannabis. She was sentenced to one year in jail and fined two million rupiah by the South Jakarta District Court on April 26, 2004. After receiving remission, she was released from the Pondok Bambu Penitentiary Institution on August 24, 2004, having served only four months in jail.

Avi planned to marry her boyfriend, Paul Jureen. She planned an engagement for July 17, 2005, with plans to marry in the Netherlands because Indonesia did not recognize same-sex marriage or gender marker changes. News coverage of their plans attracted condemnation from the Islamic Defenders Front, Lutfiah Sungkar, Guruh Sukarnoputra, and Alex Soesilo Wijoyo, a representative from Bishops' Conference of Indonesia. The marriage plans were eventually cancelled.

On November 11, 2005, a tumor was found in her lungs. She was diagnosed with lung cancer. She died on 19 January 2006 from the disease and was buried on Tempat Pemakaman Umum Kampung Kandang.
