= Diskoria =

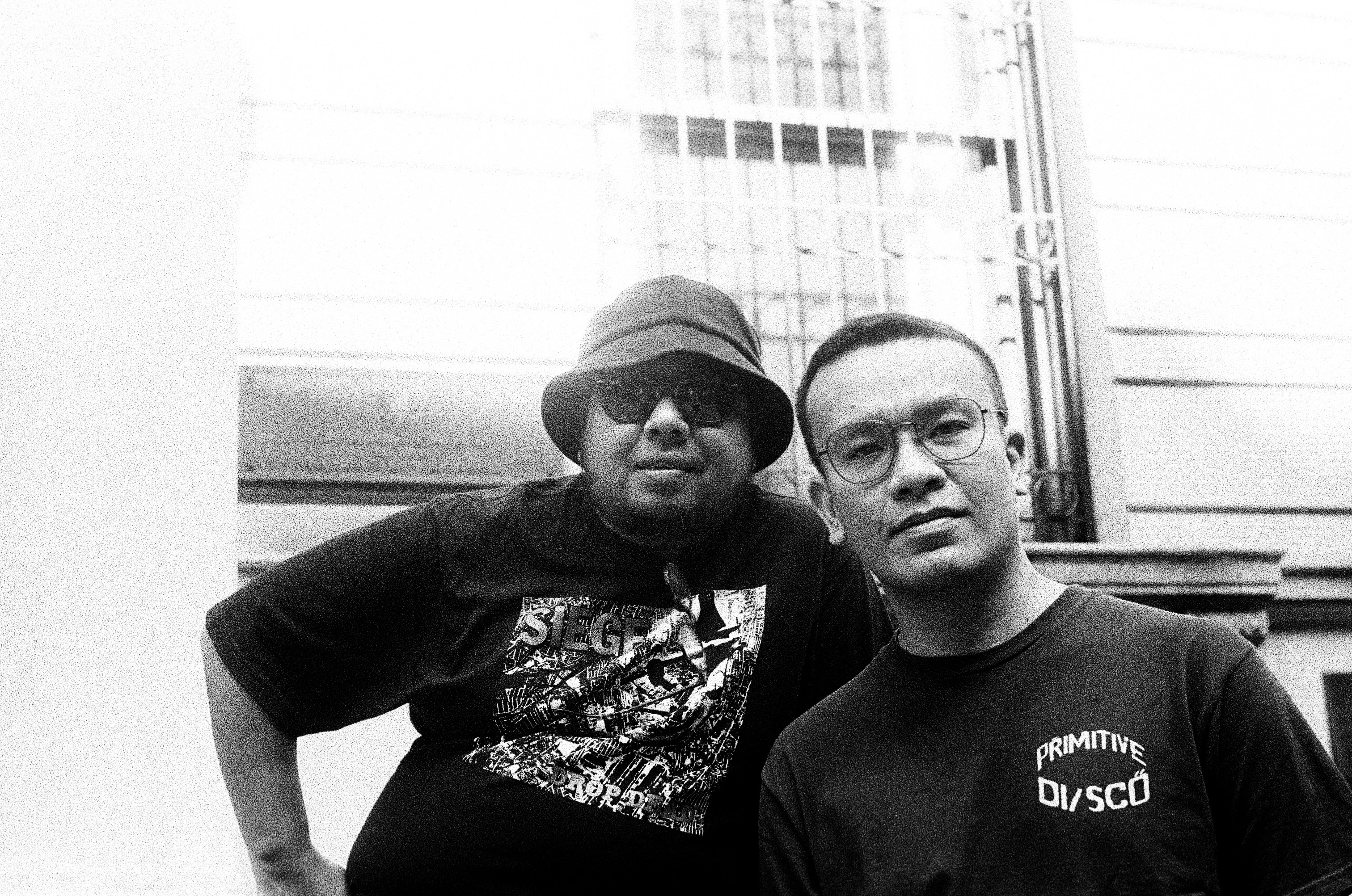
- Diskoria performing in New York, 2019

Background information
- Origin: Jakarta, Indonesia
- Genres: Disco, disco-pop, funk, pop kreatif
- Years active: 2015–present
- Label: Suara Disko
- Members: Merdi Simanjuntak; Fadli Aat

Diskoria is an Indonesian composer duo that comprises Merdi Simanjuntak and Fadli Aat. The group is considered one of the pioneers in reviving local disco music in modern-day Indonesia.

== Background ==
Diskoria's concept of playing exclusively Indonesian disco tracks in their DJ sets was sparked by restrictions against performing those songs in local clubs.

== Musical career ==
Diskoria released their debut single, "Balada Insan Muda", on 14 February 2019, in collaboration with the production team Laleilmanino. Their second single, "Serenata Jiwa Lara", featuring actress and singer Dian Sastrowardoyo, was released on 17 March 2020. All commercial proceeds from the song were donated to the Irama Nusantara Foundation, an organization dedicated to archiving Indonesian music. On 15 October 2020, Diskoria released a cover version of Hetty Koes Endang's "Pelangi Cinta" in collaboration with musician Afifah Yusuf.

== Discography ==
=== Singles ===
Title	Year	Album
"Balada Insan Muda"	2019	Non-album single
"Serenata Jiwa Lara" (featuring Dian Sastrowardoyo & Laleilmanino)	2020	Non-album single
"Pelangi Cinta" (featuring Afifah Yusuf)	2020	Non-album single
"Simfoni Rindu" (featuring Joe Taslim & Fathia Izzati)	2020	Non-album single
"C.H.R.I.S.Y.E" (featuring Eva Celia & Laleilmanino)	2021	Non-album single
"Yth: Naif" (featuring Isyana Sarasvati, Ardhito Pramono & KawaNAIF)	2021	Non-album single
"Badai Telah Berlalu" (featuring Bunga Citra Lestari & Laleilmanino)	2023	Non-album single
"Sakura Abadi" (featuring Neida Aleida & Laleilmanino)	2024	Intonesia

== Awards and nominations ==
Year	Award	Category	Nominated work	Result	Ref.
2019	Anugerah Musik Indonesia	Best Newcomer	"Balada Insan Muda"	Nominated	
2019	Anugerah Musik Indonesia	Best Soul/R&B Duo/Group/Collaboration	"Balada Insan Muda"	Nominated	
2020	Anugerah Musik Indonesia	Best Collaborative Production	"Serenata Jiwa Lara" (feat. Dian Sastrowardoyo)	Nominated	
2021	Anugerah Musik Indonesia	Best Collaborative Production	"C.H.R.I.S.Y.E." (with Laleilmanino and Eva Celia)	Won	
2021	Anugerah Musik Indonesia	Best Pop Music Arranger	"C.H.R.I.S.Y.E." (with Laleilmanino)	Nominated	
2021	Anugerah Musik Indonesia	Best Record Producer	"C.H.R.I.S.Y.E." (with Laleilmanino)	Won	
2022	Bandung Music Awards	Most Popular Pop Duo/Group/Vocal	"C.H.R.I.S.Y.E." (with Laleilmanino and Eva Celia)	Won	
2023	Anugerah Musik Indonesia	Best Pop Music Arranger	with Laleilmanino – "Badai Telah Berlalu" (by Diskoria, Laleilmanino & Bunga Citra Lestari)	Won	
2023	Anugerah Musik Indonesia	Best of the Best Production Work	with Laleilmanino – "Badai Telah Berlalu" (by Diskoria, Laleilmanino & Bunga Citra Lestari)	Won	
2023	Anugerah Musik Indonesia	Best Record Producer	with Laleilmanino – "Badai Telah Berlalu" (by Diskoria, Laleilmanino & Bunga Citra Lestari)	Won	
2023	Anugerah Musik Indonesia	Best Collaborative Production	with Laleilmanino – "Badai Telah Berlalu" (by Diskoria, Laleilmanino & Bunga Citra Lestari)	Nominated	
