= Denny Sakrie =

Indonesian music critic and radio host

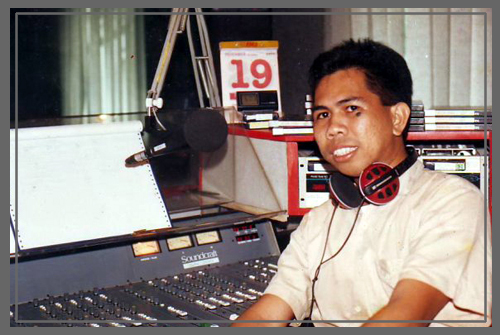
- Denny Sakrie while working as a radio broadcaster
- Born: Hamdhan Syukrie; July 14, 1963; Ambon, Maluku, Indonesia
- Died: January 3, 2015 (aged 51); South Tangerang, Banten, Indonesia
- Resting place: TPU Pondok Benda, Jl. Arjuna, RT.01/RW.09, Pondok Benda, Pamulang, South Tangerang
- Occupations: Music critic music historian musician

Hamdhan Syukrie (July 14, 1963 – January 3, 2015), better known as Denny Sakrie, was an Indonesian writer, music historian, and critic. He began his career as a music columnist while still in junior high school (in 1979) at the newspaper Pedoman Rakyat, published in Makassar, South Sulawesi. In addition, his writings were also published in other media outlets such as Hai, Variasi, Vista, Mode, Gadis, Sinar Harapan, Suara Pembaruan, and Republika. As a music critic, Denny Sakrie frequently appeared on private television channels commenting on various aspects of the Indonesian music industry. He is known amongst his peers in the industry as the "walking musical encyclopedia."

Prior to his music critic career, Denny Sakrie had a stint in a band, XX Band in 1986 and Whip Band 1988. Participating in both the Yamaha Light Music Contest and Band Explosion.

During his time as a music critic, accounts from his family and colleagues described the modest circumstances in which he worked. According to his wife, Mike Hendarwati, Sakrie often relied on internet cafés for research and writing because he did not own a computer or laptop, including while completing 100 Tahun Musik Indonesia. She also stated that he sold part of his cassette and vinyl collection to help meet household needs. Musician and conductor Addie MS similarly recalled that Sakrie was not particularly concerned with financial gain and was more focused on his work than on material matters. Singer Joshua Matulessy also recounted that Sakrie's mobile phone was frequently broken, which sometimes made it difficult to contact him.

Before his death, Denny Sakri was a regular contributor to Tempo magazine, the daily newspaper Kompas, and Rolling Stone Indonesia magazine. In addition to writing, he also worked as a radio announcer, a voice-over artist for radio and television commercials, a host, a scriptwriter for several television shows, and was a member of a number of music groups.

He died on Saturday, January 3, 2015, and was buried the following day in Pondok Benda, Pamulang, South Tangerang.

== As a radio announcer ==
- Began his career in radio by joining Radio Madama Makassar as music director and announcer. (1988)
- Joined Radio Suara Irama Indah in Jakarta as an announcer, co-hosting shows with known announcers such as Rusman Pandjaitan, Rama, Zakir, and Nien Lesmana (mother of Mira Lesmana and Indra Lesmana). (1991)
- Prambors Radio Group, serving as Music Continuity Officer at Prambors Radio Network (1992)
- Broadcaster at FeMale Radio. (1992)
- Joined M97 FM, a station dedicated to playing classic rock songs. (1995)
- Woman Radio, hosting a lifestyle-themed show titled Life Trax. (2004)
- Co-hosted the show "Galeri Musik Indonesia" with singer Irianti Erningpraja on Radio Trijaya Jakarta. (2005)
- Hosted the music show "Musical Box," broadcast nationally to 10 cities across the Radio FeMale and Delta FM networks. (2006)
- Hosted the daily program "Marketeers Mix with Denny Sakrie" on Marketeers Radio (www.marketeers.com) (2012–2014)

== Television shows ==
- Supported the music quiz show "Persembahanku" in collaboration with Ani Sumadi Production, aired on Indosiar. (1997)
- With Helmy Yahya (Triwarsana, 2001) as:
  - Question writer and creative team for the show "Kuis Siapa Berani" on Indosiar.
  - Question-writing team for the "Gladiator 1 Miliar" quiz
  - Question-writing team for the "Celebrity For Charity" quiz
  - Question-writing team for the "HP Hour" quiz
  - Question-writing team for the "Gossip or Fact?" quiz

== As a music Jurist ==
- Lomba Cipta Lagu Remaja (1996 s.d 1997)
- Tawuran Musik Levi's (1997 s.d 1999)
- Judging Panel for Anugerah Musik Indonesia (2006 s.d 2008)
- Jazz Goes To Campus Awarding (2007 s.d 2009)
- Lomba Vokal Group Indomaret Se-Indonesia (2006)
- Java Jazz International Festival Award (2008)
- Lomba Cipta Lagu BNI’46 (2008)
- Indigo Music Award Telkomsel (2009)

== Bibliography ==
- Musisiku (Bersama Komunitas Pencinta Musik Indonesia as writer and editor). Published by Republika (2007).
- Audio book Chrisye Masterpiece published by PT Musica Studio's Jakarta. (2007)
- 100 Tahun Musik Indonesia. Editor ahli David Tarigan. Jakarta: GagasMedia. 2015. ISBN 979-780-785-1.

Books that are still in process include:

- Together with Bens Leo and Theodore KS, he is currently working on a book titled The Record Man, which chronicles the 40-year history of the Aquarius Jakarta record company.
- Ensiklopop Indonesia 1950–2000
- A biography of Koes Plus to be published by Akoer Jakarta.

== Filmografi ==
- Garasi, directed by Agung Sentausa and produced by Miles Films Productions. In this film, which centers on the struggles of an indie band, Denny plays Hagi Haryadi, a music critic. The film stars Fedi Nuril and Ayu Ratna, among others. (2005)

== Achievements ==
- Finalist in the Light Music Contest at Hotel Indonesia, with XX Band (1986).
- Finalist in the Band Explosion, with Whip Band (1988).

== Death ==
On January 3, 2015, Denny Sakrie died of a heart attack. He passed away whilst being taken to Siloam Hospital Karawaci, the former radio announcer breathed his last on the way, at 12:25 WIB.

== See also ==
- Rolling Stone Indonesia's 150 Greatest Indonesian Albums of All Time
