= Transs =

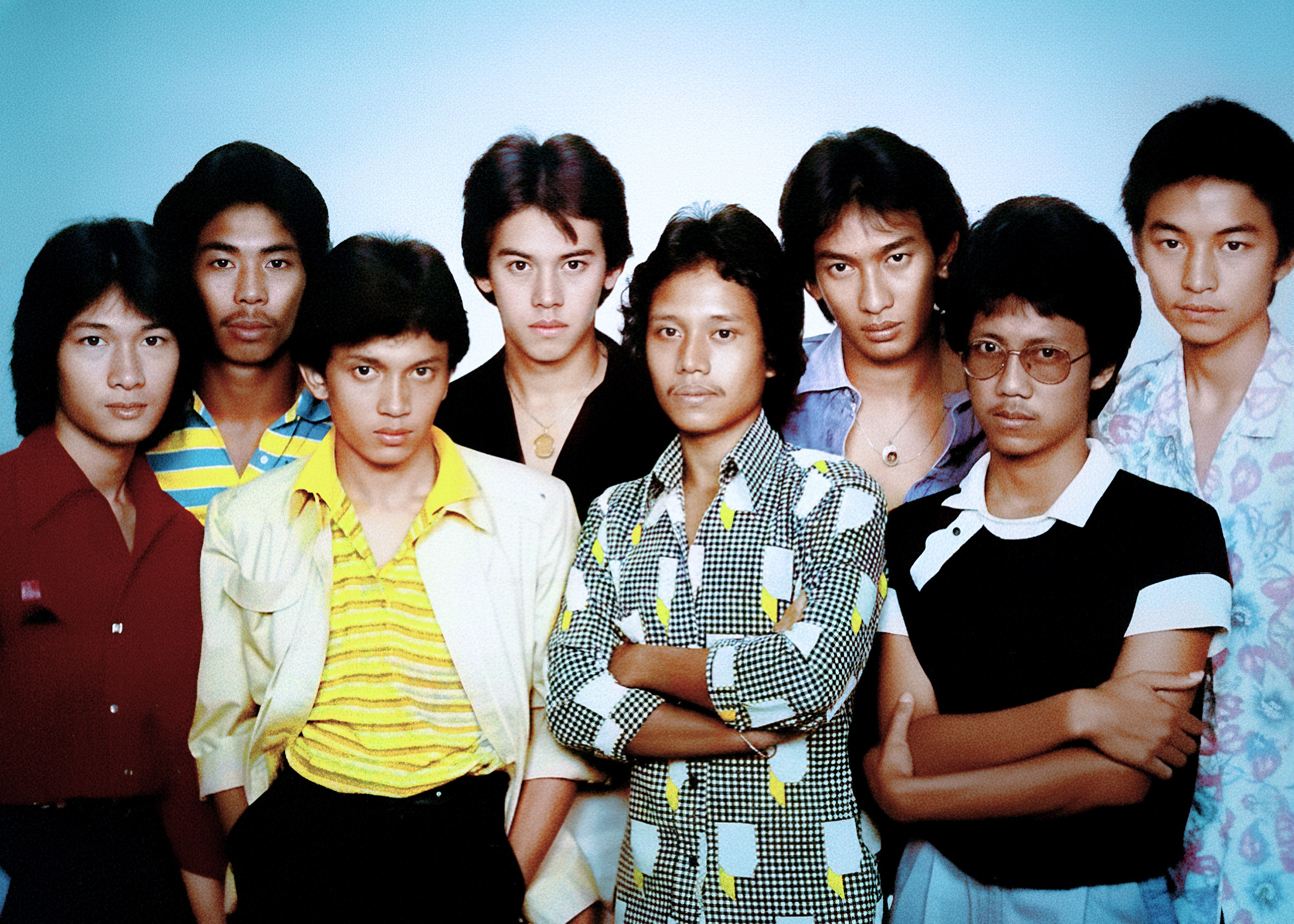

Background information
- Origin: Jakarta, Indonesia
- Genres: Jazz fusion, pop kreatif, disco, funk
- Years active: 1980–1981
- Label: Akurama Records
- Past members: Fariz RM; Erwin Gutawa; Uce Hudioro; Jundi Karjadi; Eddy Harris; Hafil Perdanakusumah; Wibi AK; Dhandung SSS

Transs were an Indonesian jazz fusion band formed on 6 June 1980. The band consisted of Fariz RM (vocals, keyboards), Erwin Gutawa (bass), Uce Haryono (drums), Jundi Karyadi (keyboards), Eddy Harris (keyboards), Hafil Perdanakusumah (flute, vocals), Wibi AK (percussion), Dhandung SSS (vocals), and backup singer Wiwiek Lismani (vocals). Transs were formed after Fariz RM served as a judge in a band competition for high school bands, where he handpicked aspiring musicians from different bands. The band released only one studio album titled Hotel San Vicente in 1981. Harlan Boer of Pophariini considered the album as a 'starting point' of Indonesian jazz fusion, which would be continued by other bands such as Karimata, Krakatau, Emerald, Spirit, and Modulus. Hotel San Vicente was also considered the 35th best Indonesian album in a 2007 Rolling Stone Indonesia list. The band also contributed to the compilation album Tembang Remaja 1981.

== Discography ==
=== Studio album ===
- Hotel San Vicente (Akurama Records, 1981)

=== Compilation album ===
- Tembang Remaja 1981 (Sky Records, 1981)
