= Christ Kayhatu =

Christ Kayhatu (27 January 1957 – 8 August 1991) was an Indonesian keyboardist, songwriter, producer, and arranger of Moluccan origin. He is best known for hit songs such as "Misteri Cinta", "Rame-rame", "Kata Hatiku", "Tersiksa Lagi", "Ambon Manise", and "Bawalah Cintaku Ini". One of his songs, "Resah", became a finalist of the Lomba Cipta Lagu Remaja 1978 competition. The song was included in the album of the same name, which was later considered by Rolling Stone Indonesia as the 3rd best Indonesian album of all time. He also created a music group that would be later named Funk Section.
