= Benny Likumahuwa =

- Born: June 18, 1947; Kediri, East Java, Indonesia
- Died: June 9, 2020 (aged 72); Kompleks Villa Mutiara, Ciputat, Tangerang Selatan, Banten, Indonesia
- Citizenship: Indonesia
- Occupation: Jazz musician
- Years active: 1965–2020
- Children: Barry Likumahuwa

Benny Likumahuwa (18 June 1947 ‒ 9 June 2020) was an Indonesian musician, the older brother of Utha Likumahuwa, and the father of Barry Likumahuwa. He died on 9 June 2020.

== Filmography ==
=== Film ===
Year	Title	Credited as	Notes
Year	Title	Composer	Notes
1978	Jaringan Antar Benua	Yes	
1978	Senja di Pulo Putih	Yes	
