= Antara Anyer dan Jakarta =

Song by Atiek CB

from the album Antara Anyer dan Jakarta
- Language: Bahasa Indonesia
- Released: 1986
- Recorded: 1986
- Genre: Pop kreatif, R&B
- Length: 4:11
- Label: Atlantic Records Indonesia
- Songwriter: Oddie Agam
- Composer: Erwin Gutawa

Music video
- Antara Anyer dan Jakarta on YouTube

"Antara Anyer dan Jakarta"

Song by Sheila Majid

from the album Emosi
- Language: Bahasa Indonesia
- Released: 1986
- Recorded: 1986
- Genre: Pop kreatif, City pop, R&B
- Length: 4:11
- Label: EMI Music Malaysia
- Songwriter: Oddie Agam
- Composer: Erwin Gutawa
- Producer: Roslan Aziz

Music video
- Antara Anyer dan Jakarta on YouTube

Antara Anyer dan Jakarta is an Indonesian song from the late 1980s written by Oddie Agam and popularised by Sheila Majid. The song describes the natural beauty of Anyer Beach.

This song was first released by Atiek CB in an album of the same title. The album was produced in 1986 with Erwin Gutawa as music director.

== Other version ==
Mytha Lestari and Karina Salim sang this song as a duet on the compilation album The Great Composers in 2015.
