= Poco-poco =

Indonesian popular line dance

Poco-poco or Poco poco is a popular line dance from North Maluku province in Indonesia.

The Poco-poco dance became popular in early 1998. At first, the Poco-Poco dance was only an environment known for its emotional closeness with family, relatives, and relatives in North Maluku. This dance is accompanied by a song from North Maluku which is also titled poco-poco. The poco-poco song was composed by a native Indonesian Ternate songwriter named Arie Sapulette and sung by a famous singer at the time named Yopie Latul. The Poco-Poco dance has found its place in the hearts of the Indonesian people. Since its release, the song and/or accompanying dance have made their way into weddings, family gatherings, and other gatherings of Indonesian people.

== History ==
The origins of Poco-poco are heavily contested, with multiple competing claims, both within Indonesia and internationally.

=== Indonesian claim ===
- North Maluku/Ternate/Ambon: Traditional claim that it originated from North Maluku province, specifically associated with local cultural traditions.
- Manado/North Sulawesi: Some claimed that this popular line dance originated from Manado, northern Sulawesi and is popularly performed by the Indonesian soldiers as a military recreational exercise

=== International Claims ===
- Philippines: Chain emails claiming that Poco-poco actually originates from the Philippines, used widely by the Christians there

== See also ==
- Cakalele
- Dance in Indonesia
