= Sinaran (song) =

Single by Sheila Majid

from the album Emosi
- Released: 1986
- Genre: Pop kreatif
- Length: 5:31
- Label: EMI Music Malaysia
- Songwriters: Adnan Abu Hassan, Johan Nawawi

"Sinaran" is a song performed by Malaysian singer Sheila Majid. It was released as the lead single from her second studio album, Emosi.

== Release ==
"Sinaran" was written by Adnan Abu Hassan and Johan Nawawi. The recording process for the song took place in Japan.

== Cover versions ==
"Sinaran" has been re-recorded four times. The song was famously performed by Azharina during her participation in Bintang RTM in 2001 and again during the second week of the reality show Gegar Vaganza in 2016. It was later re-recorded in a new version by Ayda Jebat.

American smooth jazz musician Dave Koz recorded "Sinaran" on the saxophone as a promotional single in December 1989.

Indonesian pop group Warna re-recorded "Sinaran" in 2000 with their own version while maintaining its jazz and R&B rhythm. DJ Dipha Barus also produced a remixed version of the song.

== Reception ==
"Sinaran" was released in 1986 as the lead single from the album Emosi. It became one of Sheila Majid's signature songs.

Sheila celebrated the 30th anniversary of "Sinaran" in 2016. The song was also one of several Sheila Majid tracks used as part of the soundtrack for the 2015 film of the same name, directed by Osman Ali.
