= Seno M. Hardjo =

Indonesian musical artist

Seno M. Hardjo is an Indonesian musician, producer, journalist, and poet, known for his works with singers and musicians such as Hedi Yunus, Dian Pramana Poetra, and Malyda. He is also a member of the Anugerah Musik Indonesia Board of Directors. During the 2018 Asian Para Games, Hardjo was involved as one of the composers for the opening ceremony. Seno also had a career as a poet, publishing his works in various newspapers and being featured in several poetry anthologies, including Dari Negeri Poci.

== Discography ==
- The Best of Malyda
- Born to be Singers
- The Great Composers
- Dua Dekade
- Fariz RM & Dian PP in Collaboration with
- Best Cuts of Piyu
