= Tanamur =

Former discotheque in Jakarta, Indonesia

- Interactive map of Tanamur
- Location: Jalan Tanah Abang Timur No. 14; Gambir, Jakarta, Indonesia
- Coordinates: 6.179519°S 106.8178285°E
- Owner: Ahmad Fahmy Alhady
- Type: Discothèque

Construction
- Opened: 12 November 1970
- Years active: 1970-2005

Tanamur was a nightclub in Gambir, Central Jakarta. It was inaugurated by Ahmad Fahmy Alhady in 1970 and operated until 2005. Tanamur was one of the first legally established nightclubs in Jakarta and also became one of the most renowned nightclubs in Indonesia.

The club was widely known for frequently being visited by prominent guests, such as local and international celebrities. It is also known for its egalitarian atmosphere with relaxed rules, as well as distinctive architectural style that set it apart from typical discotheques or bars.

== History ==
Under the leadership of Governor Ali Sadikin, Jakarta was rapidly developed in an effort to modernize the city into a metropolitan. One of the approaches was to attract foreign investors and promote the tourism sector. Gambling and the establishment of entertainment venues such as massage parlors (which functioned de facto as brothels) and nightclubs were permitted in order to generate tax revenue that could serve as a source of income for the province of DKI Jakarta, as well as to encourage foreign workers to remain in the city.

An Arab-Indonesian textile entrepreneur named Ahmad Fahmy Alhady, who was studying industrial engineering in Germany at the time, saw an opportunity to establish an entertainment venue that would be accessible to people from various social backgrounds. He decided to discontinue his studies and set out to build a discothèque. With a capital of around 20 to 25 million rupiah, he renovated an old house in East Tanah Abang, drawing inspiration from various discothèques in the United States, France, and Germany. After fulfilling the licensing requirements, the Tanamur nightclub officially opened on 12 November 1970. The name “Tanamur” is an acronym for “Tanah Abang Timur” (East Tanah Abang). In its early days, Tanamur also provided female hostesses.

=== Closing ===
After experiencing a decline in visitor numbers during the 1997–1998 monetary crisis—further worsened by the 2002 Bali bombings, which indirectly affected the number of guests—Tanamur was closed in 2005.

== Prominent guests ==
- Deep Purple
- God Bless
- Peter F. Gontha
- Sardono Waluyo Kusumo
- Nurul Arifin
- Bagong Kussudiardja
- Setiawan Djodi
- Muhammad Ali
- Bee Gees
- Ruud Gullit
- Gonzo 6.5 Scifo
- Guegue Kador Lalle
- Max La Classe
