= Fritz G. Schadt =

Indonesian actor (1940–2001)

- Born: Fritz G. Schadt; 21 May 1940; Medan, Dutch East Indies
- Died: 5 March 2001 (aged 60); Indonesia
- Occupations: Actor; director
- Years active: 1963–1991
- Spouse: Thendra
- Children: 4

Fritz G. Schadt (21 May 1940 – 5 March 2001) was an Indonesian director and actor. Apart from making films, he is also a lecturer at the Cinematography Academy at Institut Kesenian Jakarta.

== Personal life ==
His father was a plantation entrepreneur from Germany who had settled in Indonesia before independence, while his mother is of Dutch descent. His love to Indonesia made him decide not to come back to Europe and decided to become an Indonesian citizen after independence.

In 1967, he is married to Thendra, with whom he has four children, namely Atalarik Syach, Teddy Syach, Attila Syach and Attar Syach. Three of them became actors.

== Filmography ==
=== As an Actor ===
- Penjeberangan (1963)
- Suzie (1966)
- Matt Dower (1969)
- Si Bego Menumpas Kutjing Hitam (1970)
- Lingkaran Setan (1972)
- Anak Yatim (1973)
- Ibu Sejati (1973)
- Naga Merah (1976)
- Melati Hitam (1978)
- Midah Perawan Buronan (1983)
- Itu Bisa Diatur (1984)
- Nagabonar (1987)
- Tjoet Nja' Dhien (1988)
- Bisa Naik Bisa Turun (1991)

=== as a Director ===
- Si Gondrong (1971)
- Takdir (1973)
- Bobby (1974)
- Benyamin Si Abunawas (1974)
- Pembalasan Naga Sakti (1976)
- Balada Dua Jagoan (1977)
- Cacat dalam Kandungan (1977)
- Bang Kojak (1977)
- Si Ronda Macan Betawi (1978)
- Sakura dalam Pelukan (1979) starring Eva Arnaz dan Liem Swie King
- Cantik (1980) starring Dana Christina
- Buaya Putih (1982)
- Si Jagur (1982)
- Jaka Geledek (1983)
- Kupu-Kupu Beracun (1984)
