= Fairuz Hussein =

Malaysian musical

Fairuz bin Hussein
- فيروز حسين
- Born: 12 October 1965 (age 60); Kuala Lumpur
- Occupations: R&B/Jazz singer, songwriter, producer
- Years active: 1988–present
- Parents: Hussein Abu Hassan (father); Mahyon Ismail (mother)
- Relatives: Faizal Hussein
- Musical career
- Genres: Pop, ballad, pop kreatif, pop urban
- Instrument: Vocals

Fairuz bin Hussein (born 12 October 1965) is a Malaysian R&B and jazz singer, songwriter, and producer.

Recording artiste Fairuz Hussein is a familiar name in the Malaysian music industry. The talent of second daughter to award-winning director/actor Hussein Abu Hassan A.M.N. and actress Mahyon Ismail was discovered by well known composer and producer Adnan Abu Hassan and later was offered to sign a recording contract with international label Sony (CBS) in 1988. Fairuz Hussein was the first ever Malaysian Singer to record album in CD. Kali Pertama album was released by CBS (Sony Music), produced by Adnan Abu Hassan. It was launched on August 8, 1988. The album launch event was even on the TV news. and she is known for her hits such as Kali Pertama, Lembayung Sepi, Ku Menyintai, Kedewasaan Cinta, Coba Lagi, Sambaria, Curiga, Let's Dance etc. She is also known as Vocal educator on hit reality TV show Studio Bintang Kecil and toured Malaysia with Akademi Fantasia (season 8) as a professional jury in 2010. She is also the creator for reality TV show and producer for Geng Bakat ( RTM ) in 2012 and Eco Pintar a sitcom/art show starring Erul AF, Intan Farhani Fadzil etc. in 2013.

== Recording career ==
While singing at the Holiday Inn, her talent was discovered by award-winning producer Adnan Abu Hassan and she recorded her first album in 1988. The recordings took place in Kuala Lumpur and Jakarta. Her second album followed in 1989. She had the privilege to work with established producers and songwriters such as Harry Sabar, Elfa Seciora, Johan Nawawi, Zul Nadzar, James F Sundah, Billy J Budiardjo, Fariz RM and many more.

== Discography ==
- 1988 – Kali Pertama
- 1989 – Fairuz Hussein
- 2004 – Anugerah

== Ghetto Music Production ==
Started the company with her partner/husband Zulkifli Nadzar in 1991 intended to be only a publishing house to hold the rights for their songs. In 2003 they opened a recording studio and released two singles Lets Dance and Ketenangan Abadi and later released 'Anugerah'. One of the songs in the album, 'Yamano Ima' was chosen as finalist in the USA Songwriting competition in 2005.

She has collaborated with Zul for several albums and TV soundtracks one of them was the hit Telenovela 'A Time For Us' (in which they wrote and sang the beautiful duet 'A Place For You') a joint Malaysia/Philippines TV episodes which also has been nominated for best Telenovela in the 2010 International Emmy Awards and also in hit reality show 'Studio Bintang Kecil' where Fairuz was the vocal educator and Zul was the musical director.

== Personal life ==
Fairuz has a son, Syarifudin Amin with producer husband Zulkifli Nadzar. Though she is very active in her music career she still paints.Her Paintings are being sold at art Galleries in Petaling Jaya and Kuala Lumpur.

She and her husband are known not only as artists but also as music activists. She has spoken out against dirty politics in the Malaysian music industry and also boycotted the AIM.
