= Yovie & Nuno =

Indonesian Musical Band

- Also known as: Yovie & The Nuno (2004–2007)
- Origin: Bandung, West Java, Indonesia
- Genres: Pop rock
- Years active: 2000–present
- Label: Sony Music Indonesia Universal Music Indonesia
- Members: Yovie Widianto (Note: Since 2019, he has not played keyboards, but he remains a producer and is responsible for behind the scenes of every production of Yovie & Nuno's work.); Muchamad Ahadiyat; Ady Julian; Adhyra Yudhi Fajar Maulan; Chico Andreas Sibuea
- Past members: Agung Yudha; Yuke Sampurna; Gail Satyawaki; Rere Reza; Dudy Oris; Arya Windura; Pradikta Wicaksono
- Website: yovienuno.com

Yovie & Nuno is an Indonesian band founded in Bandung, West Java, consisting of Yovie Widianto, Dudy Oris, Muchamad Ahadiyat, Gail Satiawaki, Ersta, and Rere at the beginning of the formation and brought the name of Yovie & Nuno in March 2004 (formerly Yovie & The Nuno). At the end of 2005, with the resignation of Gail, Ersta, and Rere, the band changed their name back to Yovie & Nuno; as well as the addition of vocalist Dikta and guitarist Diat. Also in 2012, one of the vocalist member in Yovie & Nuno Dudy resigned from that band.

== Members ==
- Yovie Widianto (1999–2019)
- Yuke Sampurna (1999–2001)
- Rere Reza (1999–2007)
- Dudy Oris (1999–2012)
- Gail Satiawaki (2002–2005)
- Arya Windura (2014–2021)
- Pradikta Wicaksono (2007–2022)
- Muchamad Adidayat (1999–present)
- Ersta Satrya Nugraha (2001-2007 dan 2022–present)
- Ady Julian (2019–present)
- Adhyra Yudhi Fajar Maulana (2022–present)
- Chico Andreas Sibuea (2022–present)

== Discography ==
- Semua Bintang (2001) - by name Yovie & Nuno
- Kemenangan Cinta (2004) - by Yovie & The Nuno
- The Special One (2007) - by Yovie & Nuno
- Winning Eleven (2010)
- Single Galau (2012)
- Still The One (2014)
- Demi Hati (2019)
- Sajadah Panjang (2021)
- Misal (2022)
- Yang Baru (2024)
- Bunga Jiwaku (2025)

== Awards ==
The band's 2007 album, The Special One, won Best of the Best Album at the 2009 Anugerah Musik Indonesia (AMI) Awards. Their 2010 album, Winning 11, won Best Pop Album at the 2011 AMI Awards.

== Film and TV series ==
- Yovie & His Friends

== See also ==
- Indonesia 6
- Kahitna
- Pradikta Wicaksono
