= Pance Pondaag =

Indonesian singer

Pance Frans Pondaag (February 18, 1951 – June 3, 2010) was an Indonesian pop singer and songwriter. The Jakarta Post described Pondaag as one of Indonesia's most famous pop singers during the 1980s.

Pondaag was born on February 18, 1951, in Makassar, South Sulawesi. Pance Pondaag died of a stroke at his home in Pluit, North Jakarta, at 5 p.m. on June 3, 2010, at the age of 59. He was from the Minahasa and Sangirese ethnic groups of North Sulawesi.
