= Utha Likumahuwa =

Indonesian singer (1955–2011)

- Born: Doa Putra Ebal Johan Likumahuwa; 1 August 1955; Ambon, Indonesia
- Died: 13 September 2011 (aged 56); Jakarta, Indonesia
- Other name: Utha Likumahuwa
- Occupation: Vocalist
- Years active: 1981–2011
- Musical career
- Genres: Jazz; pop; city pop; pop kreatif
- Instrument: Vocals
- Label: Warner Music Indonesia

Doa Putra Ebal Johan "Utha" Likumahuwa (1 August 1955 – 13 September 2011) was an Indonesian singer from Ambon, Maluku.

He rose to fame in Indonesia in the 1980s with his album Nada & Apresiasi (1982) and the song "Tersiksa Lagi". His 1985 album Aku Pasti Datang was later ranked 75th in the 32nd Edition of the "150 Best Indonesian Albums" in Rolling Stone magazine.

== Career ==
Likumahuwa started his career in the 1970s as the drummer of a rock band when living in Bandung. Afterwards, he joined a jazz-rock group which played frequently in Jakarta.

In 1982, he released his debut album Nada & Apresiasi. It became a success, enabling him to continue forward into the early 2000s.

=== Achievements ===
In 1989, he received the second best performance award at the 1989 ASEAN Pop Song Festival in Manila.

Likumahuwa's other achievements include second place in the Asia Pacific Singing Contest in Hong Kong (1989) and second place in the Asia Pacific Broadcasting Union/ABU Golden Kite World Song Festival in Kuala Lumpur (1990).

== Personal life ==
Likumahuwa was married to Debby Farida Likumahuwa and has two children. He was the uncle of Barry Likumahuwa. After his career in entertainment, he was active in his community leading church services.

== Death ==
Likumahuwa fell ill while on holiday in Pekanbaru on 26 June 2011. He was treated but suffered from a stroke shortly after, leaving him paralyzed on the right side of his body. He died on 13 September 2011 after a surgery to treat his paralysis.
