= Elfa Secioria =

Indonesian composer and songwriter

Elfa Secioria Hasbullah (20 February 1959 – 8 January 2011) was an Indonesian composer and songwriter. He was the founder of the teen pop group Elfa's Singers.

Secioria was born in Garut, Indonesia, and died at Pertamina Jaya Hospital, Cempaka Putih, Jakarta, due to complications from kidney disease.

Secioria represented Indonesia at the 1987 ABU Popular Song Contest as Elfa's Singers with the song "Pesta".
