= Rolling Stone Indonesia's 150 Greatest Indonesian Albums of All Time =

The 150 Greatest Indonesian Albums of All Time (In Indonesian : 150 Album Indonesia Terbaik Majalah Rolling Stone) is the best album list according to Rolling Stone Indonesia. The list was published in December 2007 edition.
