= 14th Annual Anugerah Musik Indonesia =

Indonesian annual music award

Annual Anugerah Musik Indonesia
- Location: Ballroom Central Park, Tanjung Duren Selatan, West Jakarta
- Country: Indonesia
- Hosted by: Okky Lukman; Raffi Ahmad; Pica Priscilla

Highlights
- Most awards: Kotak (4)
- Most nominations: Irma Darmawangsa (11)
- Website: www.rcti.tv/sinopsis/anugerah-musik-indonesia-2011

Television/radio coverage
- Network: RCTI
- Runtime: 180 minutes (since 21:00 PM - 23:00 PM WIB)

The 14th Annual Anugerah Musik Indonesia was held on July 6, 2011, at the Ballroom Central Park in Tanjung Duren Selatan, West Jakarta. The show was broadcast live on RCTI and was hosted by Okky Lukman, Raffi Ahmad and Pica Priscilla.

The show was a collaboration between Anugerah Musik Indonesia Foundation and RCTI. The theme of the show was Mahakarya Musik Indonesia. Musicians, singers, and composers were nominated for 46 different categories awards. Besides the categories used in previous years, this year will also have the category Pop Trendy, a subdivision of the pre-existing pop category.

Irma Darmawangsa became the most-nominated artist in Anugerah Musik Indonesia history for the nominations with eleven times, nevertheless Darmawangsa taking home with empty-handed. Kotak became the biggest winner of the night with four wins of eight nominations, including "Best of the Best Album" for Energi, "Best Pop Song" for "Pelan-Pelan Saja", and "Best Pop Duo/Group". Other winners included Agnes Monica, Sandhy Sondoro, Evie Tamala, and Cici Paramida, who won three awards. Umay Shahab only took home two trophies each.

Elfa Secioria received the "AMI Legend Award" for a musician who has a very great service to world of Indonesian music, both of national and international.

== Host/presenters ==
- Okky Lukman
- Raffi Ahmad
- Priscilla Febrina

co-host

- Boy William
- Karenina Sunny Halim
- Ayu Dewi
- Adi Nugroho

== Nomination readers ==
- Geisha
- Bondan Prakoso
- Keisha Alvaro
- Astrid Sartiasari
- D'Masiv
- Andy/Rif
- Marcell Siahaan
- Arumi Bachsin
- Giring Ganesha
- Andien
- Erwin Gutawa
- Addie MS
- Andi Rianto

== Performers ==
- Melinda
- Killing Me Inside
- Yuni Shara
- Iwa K
- Wali
- Dira Sugandi
- Syaharani
- Andien
- Tompi
- Glenn Fredly
- Sandhy Sondoro
- Nidji
- ST 12
- Max 5
- Coboy Junior
- Yovie Widianto
- Vidi Aldiano

== Winner and nominees ==
The nominees were announced on June 15, 2011. Winners are listed first and highlighted in boldface.

=== Pop ===
**Best Pop Female Solo Artist**: **Agnes Monica – "Karena Ku Sanggup"**; Andien – "Moving On"; Astrid – "Tentang Rasa"; Gita Gutawa – "Lelaki Sempurna"; Rossa – "Memeluk Bulan"	**Best Trendy Pop Female Solo Artist**: **Alyssa Soebandono – "Cerita Cinta Kita"**; Cut Memey – "Main Mata"; Nindy – "Katakan Sejujurnya"; Poppy Bunga – "Mama Papa"; Titi Kamal – "Jatuh Cinta"
**Best Pop Male Solo Artist**: **Sandhy Sondoro – "Bunga Mimpi"**; Ari Lasso – "Huma Diatas Bukit"; Glenn Fredly – "Tersimpan"; Marcell – "Takkan Terganti"; Once Mekel – "Pasti Untukmu"; Tompi – "Aku Jatuh Cinta"	**Best Trendy Pop Male Solo Artist**: **Teuku Wisnu – "Dia Yang Kuminta"**; Adi Bing Slamet – "Kedamaian Hati"; Aditya – "Hingga Akhir Waktu"; Andhika Pratama – "Kesalahan Terbaik"; Febrian – "Cinta Itu Gila"
**Best Pop Duo/Group**: **Kotak – "Pelan-Pelan Saja"**; ADA Band – "Pemujamu"; D'Masiv – "Sudahi Perih Ini"; Kerispatih – "Tertatih"; Maliq & D'Essentials – "Terlalu"; Ungu – "Do'a Untuk Ibu"	**Best Malay Pop Duo/Group**: **D'Bagindas – "C.I.N.T.A"**; Armada – "Ku Ingin Setia"; Hijau Daun – "Aku dan Air Mata"; ST 12 – "Aku Padamu"; Wali – "Harga Diri"
**Best Pop Song**: **Pay and Dewiq – "Pelan-Pelan Saja" (performed by Kotak)**; Zulkifli – "Aishiteru" (performed by Zivilia); Tompi – "Aku Jatuh Cinta" (performed by Tompi); Michael Christian – "C.I.N.T.A" (performed by D'Bagindas); Agnes Monica and Andi Rianto – "Karena Ku Sanggup" (performed by Agnes Monica); Yovie Widianto – "Mantan Terindah" (performed by Kahitna)	**Best Pop Recording Producer**: **Yovie Widianto – "Mantan Terindah" (performed by Kahitna)**; Badai – "Aku Harus Jujur" (performed by Kerispatih); Armand Maulana, Dewa Budjana, Gusti Hendy and Thomas Ramdhan – "Amnesia" (performed by Gigi); Andi Rianto – "Karena Ku Sanggup" (performed by Agnes Monica); Pay and Dewiq – "Pelan-Pelan Saja" (performed by Kotak)
**Best Pop Album**: **Winning 11 – Yovie & Nuno**; 1000 Kisah Satu Hati – Ungu; Energi – Kotak; Perjalanan – D'Masiv; Tak Pernah Setengah Hati – Tompi

=== Rock ===
**Best Rock Duo/Group Solo Artist**: **Slank – "Jurus Tandur"**; J-Rocks – "Madu dan Racun"; Edane – "Jadi Beken"; Koil – "Aku Lupa Aku Luka"; Power Metal – "Keyakinanku"	**Best Rock Album**: **Edan – Edane**; Blacklight – Koil; Jurus Tandur – Slank; Killing Me Inside – Killing Me Inside; Nothing But Love – Whizzkid

=== Jazz/Instrumental ===
**Best Jazz/Instrumental Jazzy Duo/Group Solo Performers Artist**: **Java Jazz – "Exit Pedmit"**; F.A Talafataral – "Getting There"; Indro Hardjodikoro – "My Angels"; Jubing Kristianto – "Rek Ayo Rek"; Sketsa – "Chilhood's Dream"	**Best Vocal Jazz Duo/Group Solo Performers Artist**: **Syaharani & Queen Fireworks – "Sayang Sayang Sayang"**; Clorophyl – "Bila Cinta di Hati"; Dira Sugandi – "Inside Love"; Emerald Band – "Sudah Cukup Lama"
**Best Vocal Jazz/Instrumental Jazzy Album**: **Sandhy Sondoro – Sandhy Sondoro**; Joy Joy Joy – Java Jazz; Kirana – Andien; Save the Planet – Tohpati; Something About the Girl – Dira Sugandi; The Beginning of a Beautiful Life – Maliq & D'Essentials

=== Dangdut ===
**Best Dangdut Female/Male Solo Artist**: **Evie Tamala – "Akhir Sebuah Cerita"**; Hamdan ATT – "Rekha"; Ine Sinthya – "Bila Kau Pacarku"; Irma Darmawangsa – "Jangan Ganggu"; Rita Sugiarto – "Apa Salah dan Dosaku"	**Best Dangdut Duo/Group**: **3 Kembang – "Kegagalan Cinta"**; D'Mawar – "Kau Tetap Yang Kucinta"; Erni AB & Beninqno – "Doa"; HS. Kacheba & Irma Darmawangsa – "Ketangkep Basah"
**Best Dangdut Song**: **Evie Tamala – "Akhir Sebuah Cerita" (performed by Evie Tamala)**; Dorce Gamalama – "Apa Salah dan Dosaku" (performed by Rita Sugiarto); Edo Yahya – "Jangan Ganggu" (performed by Irma Darmawangsa); Dorce Gamalama – "Kecewa" (performed by Meggy Z); HS. Kacheba and Irma Darmawangsa – "Ketangkep Basah" (performed by HS. Kacheba (featuring Irma Darmawangsa))	**Best Dangdut Recording Producer**: **Evie Tamala and Fris Arsudi – "Akhir Sebuah Cerita" (performed by Evie Tamala)**; Babas and Supri – "Apa Salah dan Dosaku" (performed by Rita Sugiarto); Edo Yahya – "Jangan Ganggu" (performed by Irma Darmawangsa); Babas and Supri – "Kecewa" (performed by Meggy Z); Edo Yahya – "Ketangkep Basah" (performed by HS. Kacheba (featuring Irma Darmawangsa))

=== Contemporary Dangdut ===
**Best Contemporary Dangdut Female Solo Artist**: **Erie Suzan – "Tak Dapat Menunggu"**; Cici Paramida – "Cinta Dibuat-buat"; Iis Dahlia – "Mengukir Cinta"; Irma Darmawangsa – "Ratu Geol Donat"; Meggie Diaz – "Madu Merah"	**Best Contemporary Dangdut Male Solo Artist**: **Beniqno – "Pujaan Hati"**; Beniqno – "Hadirmu Bagiku"; Eric Tan – "Memang Keong Racun"; Indra L. Brugman – "Aku Mau Kawin"
**Best Contemporary Dangdut Song**: **Cici Paramida and Siti Rahmawati – "Cinta Dibuat-buat" (performed by Cici Paramida)**; Edo Yahya – "Boleh-boleh Aja" (performed by HS. Kacheba & Irma Darmawangsa); Suto Pranto – "Mengukir Cinta" (performed by Iis Dahlia); Irma Darmawangsa and HS. Kacheba – "Ratu Geol Donat" (performed by Irma Darmawangsa); Adi Sahrul Hartono and Abidal Sahrul – "Tak Dapat Menunggu" (performed by Erie Suzan)	**Best Contemporary Dangdut Recording Producer**: **Cici Paramida and Siti Rahmawati – "Cinta Dibuat-buat" (performed by Cici Paramida)**; Edo Yahya – "Boleh-Boleh Aja" (performed by HS. Kacheba & Irma Darmawangsa); H. Nano S – "Jangan Tanya-tanya" (performed by Erni AB); Suto Pranto – "Mengukir Cinta" (performed by Iis Dahlia); Adi Sahrul Hartono and Abidal Sahrul – "Tak Dapat Menunggu" (performed by Erie Suzan)

=== Children ===
**Best Children Female Solo Artist**: **Audy – "Liburan"**; Calista – "Cerah Hati"; Chilla Irawan – "Ayo Menanam"; Dara – "Tiga Kata Ajaib"; Desi Tahmila Elfa – "Mama, Aku Ingin Pulang"	**Best Children Male Solo Artist**: **Umay Shahab – "Jagoan Sejati"**; Lintar Idola Cilik – "Bundaku"; Rio Idola Cilik – "Rindukan Dirimu"; Marvin Martin – "Jangan Merokok"; Steven – "Abang Tukang Bakso"
**Best Children Duo, Group/Collaboration Artist**: **Fortunate Kids – "Menanam Jagung"**; 3C – "Putri Impian"; Ashira Brothers – "Burung Berkicau"; Monique, Hilmi and PS. Gema Tunas Pertiwi – "Jayalah Indonesiaku"; Nina, Anthony's, Fajar, Jesslyn, Angel and Tasya – "Aku Anak Pintar"; The Ladies – "Mama, Aku Ingin Pulang"	**Best Children Songwriter**: **Elfa Secioria and Fera Syl – "Mama, Aku Ingin Pulang" (performed by The Ladies)**; Nyonk Kunci and David Lau – "Ayo Menanam" (performed by Chilla Irawan); Giring Nidji and Andro Nidji – "Bundaku" (performed by Lintar Idola Cilik); Shelly – "Jagoan Sejati" (performed by Umay Shahab); Nyonk Kunci – "Jangan Merokok" (performed by Marvin Martin)
**Best Children Recording Producer**: **Elfa Secioria – "Burung Berkicau" (performed by Ashira Brothers)**; JJ. Jonathan – "Abang Tukang Bakso" (performed by Steven); Imam Pras – "Aku Anak Pintar" (performed by Nina, Anthony's, Fajar, Jesslyn, Angel and Tasya); Oni Krisnerwinto – "Bundaku" (performed by Lintar Idola Cilik); Wawan TMG – "Putri Impian" (performed by 3C)	**Best Children Album**: **Umay – Umay Shahab**; Cerita Anak – Calista; Putri Impian – 3C; Tiga Kata Ajaib – Dara

=== Production Work ===
**Best Alternative Production Work**: **Endah N Rhesa – "Monkey Song"**; Bangku Taman – "Ode Buat Kota"; Endank Soekamti – "Semoga Kau di Neraka"; Funky Kopral – "Bukan Hidupku"; Melanie Subono (featuring Anda Perdana) – "Dia Sahabat"; Super Glad – "D'4LL@Y5"	**Best R&B Production Work**: **Joeniar Arief – "Terlambat"**; Zarro – "Babe"; Dewi Marfa – "Jejak Luka"
**Best Rap/Hip-Hop Production Work**: **Bondan Prakoso & Fade 2 Black – "Ya Sudahlah"**; Bondan Prakoso & Fade 2 Black – "Kita Selamanya"; Denada – "Bisa Gila"; Mizta D – "Memble Tapi Kece"; Mizta D (featuring Rizal Armada) – "Untuk Yang Tersayang"	**Best Dance/Electronic Production Work**: **Cinta Laura – "Cinta Atau Uang"**; Dimas Beck (featuring Dewi Sandra) – "Dansa"; DJ Ai Tumbuan (featuring Ario Wahab) – "Silent Starlight"; DJ Riri (featuring Fla) – "Last Call"; DJ Romy – "Ardjuna"
**Best Reggae/Ska/Dub Production Work**: **SKJ'94 – "Skutermatik"**; Bos Gembok – "Ember"; Jammaican Soul – "Bagi Bagi Cinta"; Rebecca – "Kujatuh"; The Authentics – "Untukmu"	**Best World Music/Instrumental Production Work**: **Dwiki Dharmawan – "The Spirit of Peace"**; Joko Maryono – "Tarian Kecapi"; Suryadi Plenthe – "Sumunaring Suryo"; Suryadi Plenthe – "The Soul of Membrance"; Tohpati – "Ethno Funk"
**Best Contemporary Kroncong, Stambul, Idioms, Kroncong Production Work**: **Sundari Soekotjo – "Lgm. Gunung Batur"**; Asti – "Mahameru"; Koko Thole – "Lgm. Grebeg Jogja"; Mus Mulyadi – "Kr. Dewi Murni"; TTM (featuring Iin Indriani) – "Lgm. Putri Solo"	**Best Malay Dangdut Production Work**: **Cici Paramida – "Gadis Melayu"**; D'Jingga – "Sabda Cinta"; Iyeth Bustami – "Sudahlah"
**Best Speaking Region Dangdut Production Work**: **Sonny Josz & Dewi Purwati – "Pak Pos"**; HS. Kacheba (featuring Irma Darmawangsa) – "Bujang Lapuk"; Safitri – "Lintang Nduwur Kuto"; Sonny Josz – "Suramadu"	**Best House/Techno Dangdut Production Work**: **Melinda – "Cinta Satu Malam"**; 2 Racun – "Sorry Jack"; Indra L Bruggman – "Hoya Hoya"; Lissa – "Keong Racun"; Lolita – "Alay"
**Best Speaking Region Song Production Work**: **Didi Kempot – "Gonjang Ganjing"**; Kolebat Group – "Bongan Saha"; Ria Amelia – "Pulanglah Uda"; Sonny Josz (featuring Ratna Listy) – "Gombal Mukiyo"; Windy Saraswati – "Dasar Buaye"	**Best Collaboration Production Work**: **Titi DJ (featuring Diana Nasution) – "Jangan Biarkan"**; Ari Lasso (featuring Sandy Canester) – "Satu Cinta"; Melanie Subono (featuring Anda Perdana) – "Dia Sahabat"; Teuku Wisnu & Shireen Sungkar – "Cinta Kita"; Yuni Shara & Raffi Ahmad – "50 Tahun Lagi"

=== Field Production Support ===
**Best Recording Album Producer**: **Warner Music Indonesia – Energi (released by Kotak)**; Yonathan Nugroho, Krisna J. Sadrach and Ungu/Trinity Optima Production – 1000 Kisah Satu Hati (released by Ungu); Jan Djuhana and Bondan Prakoso/Sony Music Indonesia – For All (released by Bondan Prakoso & Fade 2 Black); Indrawati Widjaja, Yovie Widianto and Kahitna/Musica Studios – Lebih dari Sekedar Cantik (released by Kahitna); Yovie Widianto and Jan Djuhana/Sony Music Indonesia – Winning 11 (released by Yovie & Nuno)	**Best Graphic Design Album**: **Handi X – Killing Me Inside (released by Killing Me Inside)**; Adib Hidayat – Bintang Yang Bersinar (released by Drive); Nevertheless – Anytime (released by Syaharani & Queen Fireworks); Imelda – Langkah Baruku (released by Lala Suwages); Nicolas Kosasih – Montecristo (released by Montecristo); Darbotz – The Beginning of a Beautiful Life (released by Maliq & D'Essentials)
**Best Mix Engineer**: **Tommy Utomo – "Karena Ku Sanggup" (performed by Agnes Monica)**; Indra Lesmana – "Exit Pedmit" (performed by Java Jazz); Danny Lisapali and Harry SW – "Mantan Terindah" (performed by Kahitna); Stephan Santoso – "Manusia Biasa (CLB)" (performed by Yovie & Nuno); IndraQ – "Pelan-Pelan Saja" (performed by Kotak); Stephan Santoso – "Ya Sudahlah" (performed by Bondan Prakoso & Fade 2 Black)

=== General ===
**Best of the Best Album**: **Energi – Kotak**; 1000 Kisah Satu Hati – Ungu; For All – Bondan Prakoso & Fade 2 Black; Kirana – Andien; Perjalanan – D'Masiv; Winning 11 – Yovie & Nuno	**Best of the Best Newcomer**: **Sandhy Sondoro – "Bunga Mimpi"**; D'Bagindas – "Apa Yang Terjadi"; Dira Sugandi – "Inside Love"; Killing Me Inside – "Biarlah"; Zivilia – "Aishiteru"
**Best of the Best Production Work**: **"Karena Ku Sanggup" – Agnes Monica**; "Bunga Mimpi" – Sandhy Sondoro; "Pelan-Pelan Saja" – Kotak; "Tak Setampan Romeo" – Yovie & Nuno; "Ya Sudahlah" – Bondan Prakoso & Fade 2 Black

Legend Awards
**Alm. Elfa Secioria**

== Artist with most nominations and awards ==
The following artist received most nominations:

Nominations	Artist
11	Irma Darmawangsa
8	Kotak
7	HS. Kacheba
6	Bondan Prakoso & Fade 2 Black
5	Agnes Monica
4	Cici Paramida
4	Sandhy Sondoro
4	Yovie & Nuno
4	Kahitna

The following artist received most awards:

Awards	Artist
4	Kotak
3	Agnes Monica
3	Evie Tamala
3	Cici Paramida
3	Sandhy Sondoro
2	Umay Shahab
