= Musik Pop =

Studio album by Maliq & D'Essentials
- Released: May 15, 2014
- Genres: Pop; Jazz
- Length: 30:16
- Label: Organic Records
- Producers: Maliq & D'Essentials and Eki "EQ" Puradiredja

Maliq & D'Essentials chronology
Sriwedari (2013)	Musik Pop (2014)	Senandung Senandika (2017)

Musik Pop is the sixth studio album by the Indonesian jazz group Maliq & D'Essentials. The album was released on May 15, 2014, by Organic Records. The main track is a collaboration with Indra Lesmana, entitled "Ananda".

Indonesian Tempo magazine was entering to Musik Pop for Top 9 Indonesian Music Album with Tulus' Gajah.

The album was nominated for "Album of the Year" at the 2nd Indonesian Choice Awards, but lost to Sheila On 7's Musim Yang Baik. It was also nominated for "The Best Album" at the 2014 Hai Reader's Poll Music Awards and "Best of the Best Album" at the 2015 Anugerah Musik Indonesia.

== Background ==
Maliq & D'Essentials collaborated with Indra Lesmana on two tracks for the album, namely "Ananda" and "Nirwana". "Ananda" was released as a single on April 15, 2014. The band has decided to focus on mostly on digital releases. "We really want to focus on digital, because it looks like the CD era is coming to an end. We will treat CDs, cassettes, and vinyl as merchandise, while digital will be our main focus in the future. We will create a box set as well," said the vocalist, Angga Puradiredja. The album has been available online since May 1, 2014.

== Track listing ==
Music and lyrics by Maliq & D'Essentials unless otherwise stated.

No.	Title	Lyrics	Music	Length
1.	"Pintu"			1:03
2.	"Semesta"	Widi Puradiredja; Indah Wisnuwardhana; Arya "Lale" Aditya	Aditya	4:45
3.	"Ananda (feat. Indra Lesmana)"		W. Puradiredja; Aditya; Ilman Ibrahim	3:08
4.	"Imajinasi"	W. Puradiredja	W. Puradiredja; Aditya	3:09
5.	"Ombak Utara"	W. Puradiredja	W. Puradiredja	3:14
6.	"Taman"	W. Puradiredja; Wisnuwardhana	W. Puradiredja; Aditya; Ibrahim	4:10
7.	"Himalaya"	W. Puradiredja; Aditya; Ibrahim; Dendy "Javafinger" Sukarno	W. Puradiredja; Aditya; Ibrahim; Sukarno	3:05
8.	"Nirwana (feat. Indra Lesmana)"		W. Puradiredja	5:37
Total length:				27:31

Vinyl edition bonus CD
No.	Title	Length
1.	"Kayangan"	1:58
2.	"Ombak Utara" (demo version)	2:43
3.	"Semesta" (demo version)	4:32
4.	"Taman" (demo version)	3:46
5.	"Ananda" (demo version)	2:52
6.	"Imajinasi" (demo version)	2:52
7.	"Himalaya" (demo version)	3:55
8.	"Nirwana" (demo version)	3:02
9.	"Polar"	1:51
Total length:		27:31

== Awards and nominations ==
Year	Awards	Category	Result
2014	Tempo Magazine	Top 9 Indonesian Music Album	Won
2014	Hai Reader's Poll Music Awards	The Best Album	Nominated
2015	Indonesian Choice Awards	Album of the Year	Nominated
2015	Anugerah Musik Indonesia	Best of the Best Album	Nominated

== Personnel ==
Maliq & D'Essentials

- Angga Puradiredja - vocals
- Indah Wisnuwardhana - vocals
- Widi Puradiredja - drums
- Dendy "Javafinger" Sukarno - bass
- Arya "Lale" Aditya - guitar
- Ilman Ibrahim - keyboards

Additional musicians

- Indra Lesmana - vocoder, synthesizer
- Alvin Witarsa - 1st violin
- Saptadi Kristiawan - 2nd violin
- Jeffrin Parulian - viola
- Robby Subarja - cello

Production

- Maliq & D'Essentials - producer
- Eki "EQ" Puradiredja - producer
- Widi Puradiredja - mixing, engineer
- Dendy "Javafinger" Sukarno - mixing, engineer
- Geoff Pesche - mastering
