= The Beginning of a Beautiful Life =

Studio album by Maliq & D'Essentials
- Released: July 8, 2010
- Recorded: Organic Lab
- Genre: Pop
- Length: 30:16
- Labels: Organic Records and Warner Music Indonesia
- Producers: Eki "EQ" Puradiredja and Widi Puradiredja

Maliq & D'Essentials chronology
Mata Hati Telinga (2009)	The Beginning of a Beautiful Life (2010)	Sriwedari (2013)

The Beginning of a Beautiful Life is the fourth studio album from Indonesian pop group Maliq & D'Essentials. Released on 8 July 2010, it is the last album to feature keyboardist Ifa Fachir who left the band the following year.

== Track listing ==
All tracks are written by Widi Puradiredja except where noted.

The Beginning of a Beautiful Life
No.	Title	Lyrics	Music	Length
1.	"Beautiful Life"	Indah Wisnuwardhana	Widi Puradiredja; Ifa Fachir; Wisnuwardhana	4:03
2.	"Maybe You"			4:23
3.	"Terlalu"			4:35
4.	"Penasaran"	W. Puradiredja; Angga Puradiredja	Arya "Lale" Aditya; W. Puradiredja	4:00
5.	"Get Down & Slide"	W. Puradiredja; A. Puradiredja; Wisnuwardhana		4:06
6.	"Berbeda"	W. Puradiredja; A. Puradiredja; Wisnuwardhana; Dendy "Javafinger" Sukarno		3:55
7.	"Menari"			5:14
Total length:				30:16

== Personnel ==
Maliq & D'Essentials

- Angga Puradiredja – vocals
- Indah Wisnuwardhana – vocals
- Widi Puradiredja – drums, Moog
- Dendy "Javafinger" Sukarno – bass
- Arya "Lale" Aditya – guitar
- Ifa Fachir – keyboards

Additional musicians

- Amar Ibrahim – trumpet and flugelhorn (tracks 1, 2, 4 and 7)
- Reza Jozef "Rejoz" Patty – percussion (tracks 2, 3, 4 and 7)
- Doni Koeswinarno – flute and saxophone (tracks 1, 2 and 7)

Production

- Eki "EQ" Puradiredja – producer
- Widi Puradiredja – co-producer, engineer
- Indra Lesmana – mixing and mastering
- Dendy "Javafinger" Sukarno – engineer
