= Maliq & D'Essentials =

Indonesian band

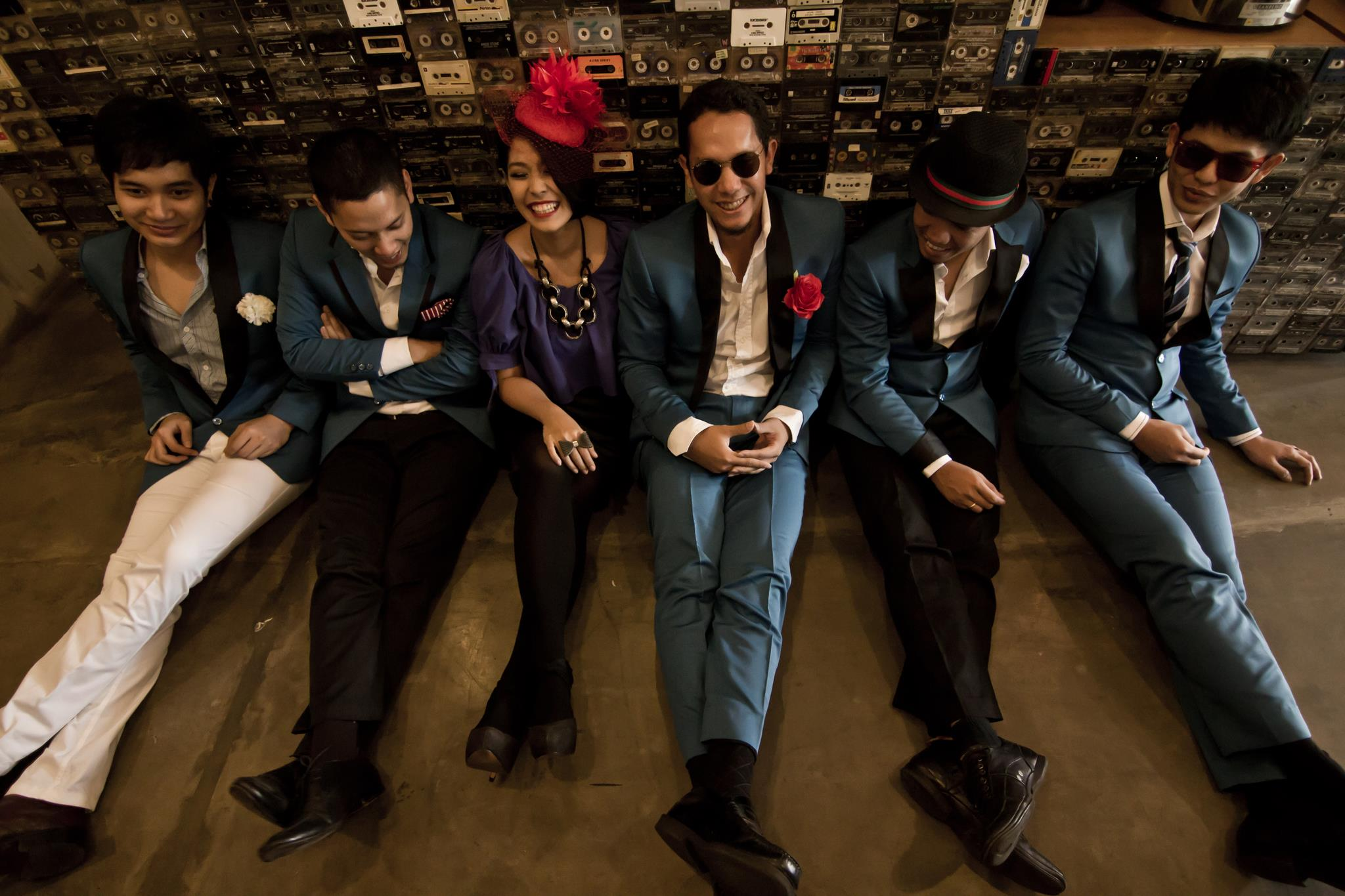
- Left to Right: Lale, Widi, Indah, Angga, Jawa and Ilman

Background information
- Origin: Jakarta, Indonesia
- Genres: Jazz; Soul; Pop; Downtempo
- Years active: 2002–present
- Labels: Warner Music Indonesia (2004–2010); Organic Records (2010–present); Warner Music Indonesia (2022–present)
- Members: Angga Puradiredja; Widi Puradiredja; Indah Wisnuwardhana; Dendy 'Javafinger/Jawa' Sukarno; Arya 'Lale' Aditya Ramadhya; Ilman Ibrahim Isa
- Past members: Dimi Hapsari; Nur Satriatama 'Satrio'; Ifa Fachir; Amar Ibrahim
- Website: instagram.com/maliqmusic

MALIQ & D'Essentials is an Indonesian jazz and soul music band from Jakarta. Since their appearance in the Jakarta International Java Jazz Festival in 2005, Maliq & D'Essentials popularity has increased, especially among young people in Jakarta.

The combination of Indonesian and English in their songs has become one of the typical flagships of their music. Their work is considered to be distinctive among other Indonesian music.

== Biography ==
Maliq & D'Essentials was conceived on 15 May 2002 with eight personnel under a genre they call organic music. The name MALIQ itself is an acronym for Music and Live Instrument Quality as the brainchild of brothers Angga & Widi Puradiredja (the group's vocalist and drummer, respectively; as well as producer, composer and arranger for the group). The completion of the band became full circle with the presence of Indah & Dimi (vocals), Ifa (keys), Jawa (bass), Satrio (guitars) and Amar (horns). The group started out performing soul and soul-inspired music at different lounges and cafes in Jakarta. The first two years they went through was a solidification process for the group; as well as a way to introduce soul and/or soulful-inspired music to the Indonesian public; as it is yet to be widely known at the time of the group's establishment.

=== 2004-06: 1st ===
Come 2004, Maliq & D'Essentials officially became part of the Indonesian music recording industry with the release of their premiere album, 1st, with the single "Terdiam". A second single, "Untitled", soon followed and became the hit song that put the group on the map. The third single from their premiere album, "Sampai Kapan", is a collaboration with Malaysian singer Camelia. The fourth and final single from 1st Maliq & D'Essentials is entitled "Kangen". By 2006, the group released a repackaged version of their premiere album entitled 1st Maliq & D'Essentials Special Edition with a hit single entitled "The One". At the same time, Dimi one of the vocalists decided to leave the band to pursue a solo career. The group's first record had not only given them a name for themselves in the Indonesian music industry, but also gave way to their rise to fame in neighboring countries of Malaysia, Singapore and Brunei Darussalam.

By this time, the group were nominated for and/or won many awards such as MTV Indonesia Music Awards, Anugerah Planet Muzik, AMI Awards, & MTV Asia Awards.

=== 2007-08: Free Your Mind ===
In early 2007, Maliq & D'Essentials released their sophomore record, Free Your Mind with a hit single entitled "Heaven"; followed by "Beri Cinta Waktu" as a second single not long after. Two more noteworthy achievements happened during this particular time. The first was being awarded Best Jazz Album for Free Your Mind in the 2008 AMI Awards. The second was a soundtrack for a major motion picture. Thus, two singles from Free Your Mind (Repackaged) (released in early 2008) "Dia" and "Kau Yang Bisa", became the original soundtrack for the movie Claudia/Jasmine. In August 2008, they also performed a concert at Brisbane, Australia to entertain Indonesian students who are in the country.

=== 2009: Mata Hati Telinga ===
Around this time, the group went through another change in their core personnel. After Dimi's departure around 2006; Satrio, the group's guitarist decided to leave and was quickly replaced by Arya Aditya Ramadhya, more widely known as "Lale". By 2009, the group released their newest record entitled Mata Hati Telinga. Now the youngest member of Maliq & D'Essentials, Lale with his rock background had added another color to the group's unique sound. The pop-rock up-tempo song "Pilihanku" was chosen as the first single from the third album. It was somewhat different from what the public would know of Maliq & D'Essentials; although the group's color never faded away from the newly explored influences. Along with second single "Coba Katakan", Maliq & D'Essentials was able to broaden the horizon of their listeners and/or fans. The third album Mata Hati Telinga also received the title as the "Best Album 2009" by Rolling Stone Indonesia magazine.

Another milestone for the group; along with the release of Mata Hati Telinga album was the introduction of The One Management and Organic Records. It was created to accommodate the group with a comprehensive, open, secure, proper and prestigious management; along with a record company that would give them as much freedom to explore their music. In addition through Organic Records, Maliq & D'Essentials assumed the role of executive producers for new talents such as Twentyfirst Night, Boogiemen, Soulvibe, Renita, Djemima, Sir Dandy, Rock n Roll Mafia and The Upstairs.

In March 2009, Maliq & D'Essentials performed for the fourth time at the 5th annual Jakarta International Java Jazz Festival, after being absent the previous year. The performance featured The Organic All-Stars which included Twentyfirst Night, Boogiemen and Renita. Recorded live at the Jakarta Convention Centre, the performance became an addition to the group's discography as a DVD distributed by early 2010.

Over the years of the group's existence, they have developed a following of loyal fans, eventually named D'Essentials. By early 2009, a few months before the group's 7th Anniversary, a formal D'Essentials Team was established. As a result, a premiere (and not to mention quite successful) collaboration between The One Management/Organic Records and D'Essentials happened at Maliq & D'Essentials "7th Year Celebration" to celebrate the group's 7th Anniversary; as well as a form of appreciation to all D'Essentials who had been supporting them.

=== 2010-11: The Beginning of a Beautiful Life ===
Their fourth album, The Beginning of a Beautiful Life, was released to the market in June 2010, with the song "Terlalu" as the first single, followed by "Menari" and "Penasaran" as a second single and third single. At this time, Ifa, the group's keyboardist decided to leave and was replaced by Ilman Ibrahim Isa, more widely known as "Ilman".

In 2011, they performed in Melbourne, Australia in May and a solo concert Maliq & D'Essentials Live in Malaysia at the KL Live, Kuala Lumpur, Malaysia on December. The concert tickets were sold out by their fans in the country.

=== 2012: Radio Killed the TV Stars ===
In 2012, Maliq & D'Essentials with some indie musicians from various genres of music participated in a compilation album titled Radio Killed The TV Star, which was released by The One Management and Organic Records. This compilation is a movement from indie musicians and indie record label for Indonesia's music industry. The musicians that have contributed in this album include Maliq & D'Essentials, Endah N Rhesa, Twentyfirst Night, Zore, The Upstairs, Rock 'N Roll Mafia, and others. The single from Maliq & D'Essentials from this compilation album was titled "Berlari dan Tenggelam".

=== 2013: Sriwedari ===
Their fifth album, Sriwedari, was released on 25 January 2013. The first single from this album is "Setapak Sriwedari" and followed by the second single with a dangdut genre, "Drama Romantika". The third single of this album is "Dunia Sekitar". Different from the previous albums which sound 'American', this fifth album has more of a vintage feel. On behalf of the totality, the album was inspired by several classic British band, mastering a passing phase in the legendary studio where The Beatles worked on music, Abbey Road Studios. The fifth album also received the title as one of the Best Album 2013 by Rolling Stone Indonesia magazine.

The album was launched in Gandaria City Mall, Jakarta, with Setapak Sriwedari Concert as the event title on 10 February 2013, attended by thousands of Maliq & D'Essentials fans. After "Setapak Sriwedari Concert" was done, the concert was also held in Java Jazz Festival, Bali, and Surabaya. In October 2013, they also performed a showcase named Maliq & D'Essentials Live in Singapore 2013 at The Home Club, Singapore.

=== 2014: Musik Pop ===
In 2014, Maliq & D'Essentials released their sixth album, Musik Pop, on 15 May 2014. "Ananda" is the first single of the album, featuring Indonesian legendary musician Indra Lesmana. The launch of the album itself was held in Jazzy Nite Citos along with the 12-year anniversary of the band, attended by thousands of fans of Maliq & D'Essentials and recorded by Kompas TV. In May 2014, they performed a concert at Sydney, Australia to indulge their fans such as Indonesian students in the country.

=== 2016: Pop Hari Ini ===
In 2016, MALIQ & D'Essentials alongside other 8 indie musicians released a compilation album titled, "Pop Hari Ini." In this compilation album, MALIQ & D'Essentials also released their latest single, "Mendekat, Melihat, Mendengar." Both album and song are only available on Blibli.com

=== 2017: Senandung Senandika ===
On 1 May 2017, the band announced the release of their seventh album Senandung Senandika, preceded on 2 May by a pair of singles, "Senang" and "Sayap". The album was released digitally on 15 May, coinciding with the band's 15th anniversary, with the album becoming available on CD at the launch event on 21 May. Fans who had pre-ordered a limited amount of signed CDs from Blibli.com were able to receive their copies a few days earlier than general sale.

=== 2021: RAYA ===
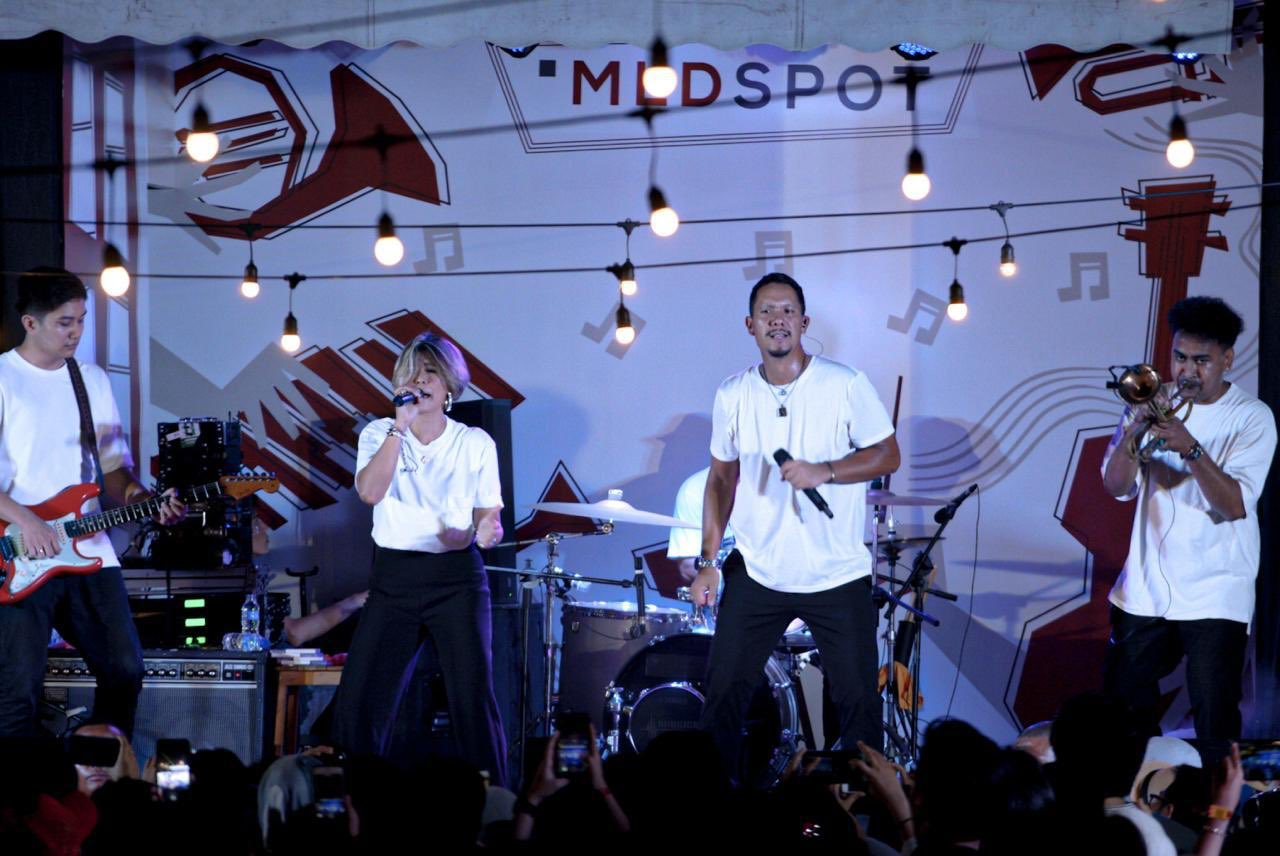
Maliq & D'Essentials performing at the 2020 Java Jazz Festival.

On 14 February 2021, the group release a six-track EP titled Raya.

=== 2023: Perform at Coldplay's concert ===
British rock band Coldplay invited Maliq & D'Essentials on stage during the Music of the Spheres World Tour at Gelora Bung Karno Stadium on 15 November 2023. The Indonesian band performed "Senja Teduh Pelita", serenading Coldplay frontman Chris Martin while he was seated on the stage.

== Band members ==
Current members

- Angga Puradiredja – lead vocals (2002–present)
- Indah Wisnuwardhana – lead vocals (2002–present)
- Arya 'Lale' Aditya Ramadhya – guitar (2008–present)
- Dendy 'Javafinger/Jawa' Sukarno – bass (2002–present)
- Ilman Ibrahim Isa' – keys (2011–present)
- Widi Puradiredja – drums (2002–present)

Additional members (only when performing live)

- Reza Jozef "Rejoz" Patty – percussion (2002–present)
- Mohammed Kamga – backing vocals (2019–present)
- Menu' Hentiasanti – backing vocals (2006-2008, 2015–present)
- Meilita Kasiman Perwirana – backing vocals (2019–present)
- Jordy Revilian Waelauruw – trumpet (2016–present)

Former members

- Dimi Hapsari – lead vocals (2002–2006)
- Nur Satriatama 'Satrio' – guitar (2002–2007)
- Amar Ibrahim – trumpet (2002-2010)
- Ifa Fachir – keys (2002–2011)
- Renita Martadinata – backing vocals (2006–2011)
- Annisa Fidianti – backing vocals (2011–2015)
- Arlinda Sudarbo – backing vocals (2011–2016)

== Discography ==
=== Albums/EPs ===
Year	Album details	Singles
2005	1st: Released: 2005; Label: Warner Music Indonesia; Formats: CD, Cassette, digital download	Terdiam; Untitled; Sampai Kapan; Kangen
2006	1st Special Edition: Released: 2006; Label: Warner Music Indonesia; Formats: CD, Cassette, digital download	The One
2007	Free Your Mind: Released: 2007; Label: Warner Music Indonesia; Formats: CD, Cassette, digital download	Heaven; Beri Cinta Waktu
2008	Free Your Mind (Repackaged): Released: 2008; Label: Warner Music Indonesia; Formats: CD, Cassette	Dia; Kau Yang Bisa
2009	Mata Hati Telinga: Released: 2009; Label: Warner Music Indonesia; Formats: CD, digital download	Mata Hati Telinga; Pilihanku; Coba Katakan
2010	The Beginning of a Beautiful Life: Released: 2010; Label: Warner Music Indonesia; Formats: CD, digital download	Terlalu; Menari; Penasaran
2013	Sriwedari: Released: 2013; Label: Organic Records; Formats: CD, digital download	Setapak Sriwedari; Dunia Sekitar
2014	Musik Pop: Released: 2014; Label: Organic Records; Formats: CD, digital download, vinyl	Ananda; Himalaya; Semesta
2017	Senandung Senandika: Released: 2017; Label: Organic Records; Formats: CD, digital download	Senang; Sayap; Musim Bunga; Idola
2021	RAYA: Released: 2021; Label: Organic Records; Formats: digital download	Bertemu; Memori; Bilang; Semoga; Sesuatunya
2024	CAN MACHINES FALL IN LOVE?: Released: 2024; Label: Warner Music Indonesia; Formats: digital download	Aduh; Kita Bikin Romantis; Begini Begitu

=== Other Album/EP ===
Year	Album details	Singles
2017	25 Tahun McDonald's Indonesia: Released: 2017; Label: McDonald's Indonesia; Formats: digital download	Bagaimana Kutahu

=== Compilation albums ===
Year	Album details	Singles
2015	Self Titled - Maliq & D'essentials (Sriwedari + Musik Pop + 1 Single): Released: 2015; Label: Organic Records; Formats: CD	Aurora
2019	Maliq & D'essentials: The Essential Hits – Recorded Live in London: Released: 2019; Label: Organic Records; Formats: DVD	Senja Teduh Pelita

=== Other singles ===
- "Tafakur" (2008, Kompilasi LCLM 2008)
- "Prasangka" (2011, A Tribute to KLa Project)
- "Berlari dan Tenggelam" (2012, Kompilasi Radio Killed The TV Stars #1)
- "Barcelona" (2014, Fariz RM & Dian PP in Collaboration With)
- "Mendekat, Melihat, Mendengar" (2016, Kompilasi Pop Hari Ini)
- "Lautan Kenangan" (2017, Candra Darusman: Detik Waktu)
- "Senja Teduh Pelita" (2019)
- "Pertama (2019)
- "Langkah Baikmu Berarti (2021)
- "Kamulah Satu-Satunya (2021, feat. DEWA 19)
- "Aku Disini Untukmu (2021, feat. DEWA 19)
- "Aku Cinta Kau Dan Dia (2021, feat. DEWA 19)

=== DVD ===
- "MALIQ & D'ESSENTIALS feat. Organic All Stars - Live at the Jakarta International Java Jazz Festival 2009" (2010)

=== Book ===
- The Beginning of a Beautiful Life, "a story yet to be told." (2010)

== Awards and nominations ==
=== Anugerah Musik Indonesia ===
Year	Nominee / work	Award	Result
2006	"The One"	Best R&B Production	Nominated
2008	"Heaven"	Best R&B Production	Nominated
2008	"Free Your Mind"	Best Jazz Album	Won
2009	"Dia"	Best R&B Production	Nominated
2010	"Pilihanku"	Best R&B Production	Nominated
2011	"Maliq & D'Essentials"	Best Duo/Group Performance	Nominated
2011	"The Beginning of a Beautiful Life"	Best Jazz Album	Nominated
2011	"The Beginning of a Beautiful Life"	Best Graphic Design Album	Nominated
2013	"Prasangka"	Best Pop Duo/Group	Nominated
2014	"Maliq & D'Essentials"	Best Urban Duo/Group	Won
2014	"Drama Romantika"	Best Alternative Production	Nominated
2015	"Maliq & D'Essentials"	Best Pop Duo/Group	Nominated
2015	"Barcelona (Maliq & D'Essentials ft. Fariz RM)"	Best Pop Collaboration	Nominated
2015	"Musik Pop"	Best Album	Nominated
2015	"Himalaya (Widi Puradiredja)"	Best Songwriter	Nominated
2015	"Aurora"	Best Urban Production	Won
2015	"Ananda"	Best Urban Production	Nominated
2015	"Semesta"	Best Original Movie Soundtrack Production	Nominated
2015	"Semesta (Widi Puradiredja)"	Best Record Director	Nominated
2016	"Mendekat, Melihat, Mendengar"	Best Soul/R&B/Urban Artist Group/Collaboration	Nominated
2017	"Senandung Senandika"	Best Album	Nominated
2017	"Senandung Senandika"	Best Soul/R&B/Urban Album	Nominated
2018	"Bagaimana Kutahu"	Best Pop Duo/Group/Vocal/Group/Collaboration	Nominated
2018	"Friends (OST. Partikelir)"	Best Original Movie Soundtrack Production	Nominated
2018	"Lautan Kenangan"	Best Urban Production	Nominated
2019	"Senja Teduh Pelita"	Best Urban Duo/Group/Vocal Group/Collaboration	Nominated
2021	"Bilang"	Best Duo/Group	Nominated
2021	"RAYA"	Best Pop Album	Nominated
2022	"Aku Cinta Kau dan Dia"	Best Duo/Group	Nominated
2024	"Kita Bikin Romantis"	Best Production	Nominated
2024	"Can Machine Fall in Love?"	Best of The Best Album	Nominated
2024	"Kita Bikin Romantis"	Best Duo/Group	Won
2024	"Aduh"	Best Pop Songwriter	Nominated
2024	"Can Machine Fall in Love?"	Best Pop Album	Nominated
2025	"Kumpul Bocah"	Best Pop Duo/Group	Nominated
2025	"Kumpul Bocah"	Best Original Movie Soundtrack Production	Nominated

=== Anugerah Planet Muzik ===
Year	Nominee / work	Award	Result
2006	"Maliq & D'Essentials"	Best New Duo/Group	Won
2006	"1st"	Best Album	Nominated
2011	"'Sampai Kapan' - Atilia & Maliq & D'Essentials"	Best Collaboration	Nominated

=== Dahsyatnya Awards ===
Year	Nominee / work	Award	Result
2011	"Terlalu"	Best Music Video	Nominated

=== HAI Reader's Poll Music Awards ===
Year	Nominee / work	Award	Result
2012	"Maliq & D'Essentials"	Best Stage Act	Nominated
2013	"Maliq & D'Essentials"	Best Pop	Nominated
2013	"Sriwedari"	Best Album	Nominated
2013	"Maliq & D'Essentials"	Best Stage Act	Nominated
2013	"Maliq & D'Essentials"	Best Costume	Nominated
2013	"Setapak Sriwedari"	Best Single	Nominated
2014	"Maliq & D'Essentials"	Best Pop	Nominated
2014	"Musik Pop"	Best Album	Nominated
2015	"Maliq & D'Essentials"	Best Pop	Nominated

=== Indonesia Cutting Edge Music Awards (ICEMA) ===
Year	Nominee / work	Award	Result
2010	"Mata Hati Telinga"	Favourite Album Packaging	Won
2010	"Pilihanku"	Favourite Pop Song	Nominated

=== MTV Asia Awards ===
Year	Nominee / work	Award	Result
2006	"Maliq & D'Essentials"	Most Favorite Artist Indonesia	Nominated

=== MTV Indonesia Music Awards ===
Year	Nominee / work	Award	Result
2005	"Maliq & D'Essentials"	Most Favorite New Artist	Nominated

=== NET. Indonesian Choice Awards ===
Year	Nominee / work	Award	Result
2014	"Maliq & D'Essentials"	Group/Band/Duo/ of The Year	Nominated
2014	"Setapak Sriwedari"	Album of The Year	Nominated
2015	"Musik Pop"	Album of The Year	Nominated
2017	"Mendekat, Melihat, Mendengar"	Music Video of The Year	Nominated

=== Yahoo! OMG Awards ===
Year	Nominee / work	Award	Result
2013	"Maliq & D'Essentials"	Best Group	Nominated

=== Piala Maya ===
Year	Nominee / work	Award	Result
2016	"Mendekat, Melihat, Mendengar"	Best Music Video	Nominated
