= Satu (Iwan Fals album) =

Satu (feat.Noah, Nidji, Geisha & d'Masiv)

Studio album by Iwan Fals
- Released: November 20, 2015
- Genres: Indo pop, alternative
- Length: 42:57
- Label: Musica Studios
- Producer: Steve Lillywhite

Iwan Fals chronology
Raya (2013)	Satu (feat.Noah, Nidji, Geisha & d'Masiv) (2015)

Singles from SATU
- 1. "Tak Seimbang (feat Geisha)" Released: December 7, 2015; 2. "Yang Terlupakan (feat NOAH)" Released: December 20, 2015; 3. "Abadi (All Stars)" Released: January 15, 2016; 4. "Satu-Satunya (feat d'Masiv)" Released: February 14, 2016; 5. "Hdup Yang Hebat (feat Nidji)" Released: Maret 14, 2016; 6. "Kemesraan (All Stars)" Released: June 18, 2016

Satu (Indonesian: "One") is a 2015 album by the bands Noah, Nidji, Geisha & d'Masiv. It is the biggest album project from Iwan Fals with. This album contains criticism about the haters and a little romance. This album when it was released on iTunes immediately placed the third chart. Steve Lilywhite not only as a producer but join to composed "ABADI" with the various musician songwriters.

== Track listing ==
No.	Title	Length
1.	"Abadi (All Stars)"	4:01
2.	"GEISHA – Tak Seimbang (feat. Iwan Fals)"	4:13
3.	"Yang Terlupakan (feat NOAH)"	4:11
4.	"Satu-Satunya (feat d'Masiv)"	3:36
5.	"Nidji – Hidup Yang Hebat (feat. Iwan Fals)"	3:54
6.	"d'Masiv – Entah (feat. Iwan Fals)"	4:16
7.	"NOAH – Para Penerka (feat. Iwan Fals)"	4:54
8.	"Ijinkan Aku Menyayangimu (feat GEISHA)"	4:32
9.	"Pesawat Tempurku (feat Nidji)"	5:29
10.	"Kemesraan (All Stars)"	5:11
Total length:		42:57
