= Free Your Mind (Maliq & D'Essentials album) =

- Standard edition cover

Studio album by Maliq & D'Essentials
- Released: February 26, 2007 (original album), 1 April 2008 (repackaged edition)
- Studio: Organics (Jakarta)
- Genre: Pop
- Length: 1:02:13 (original album), 1:05:51 (repackaged edition)
- Languages: Indonesian; English
- Labels: Swara Bumi; Warner Music Indonesia
- Producer: Eki "EQ" Puradiredja

Maliq & D'Essentials chronology
1st (2005)	Free Your Mind (2007)	Mata Hati Telinga (2009)

Free Your Mind is the second album from the Indonesian pop group Maliq & D'Essentials. As opposed to the previous album, which revolved around core duo Angga and Widi Puradiredja with the support of assorted musicians, this album marked the beginning of Maliq & D'Essentials as a band in the studio. Released on 26 February 2007, it is also the last album to feature guitarist Satrio Moersid, who left in mid-November of the same year to start the band Alexa. A repackaged edition of the album, including two new songs and a reggae version of "Beri Cinta Waktu", was released in early 2008 with Moersid removed from the revised album artwork.

== Track listing ==
No.	Title	Lyrics	Music	Length
1.	"Funk Flow!!"	Pradana "Kyriz" Rizky; Indah Wisnuwardhana; Widi Puradiredja	W. Puradiredja	3:50
2.	"Heaven"	Angga Puradiredja; W. Puradiredja	A. Puradiredja; W. Puradiredja	3:36
3.	"Free Your Mind"	A. Puradiredja; W. Puradiredja	A. Puradiredja; W. Puradiredja	5:09
4.	"Menikmati Cinta"	A. Puradiredja; W. Puradiredja	A. Puradiredja; W. Puradiredja	4:49
5.	"Masih Tersimpan"	A. Puradiredja	A. Puradiredja	4:27
6.	"Itu Adanya"	W. Puradiredja	W. Puradiredja	4:22
7.	"Beri Cinta Waktu"	W. Puradiredja	W. Puradiredja	4:12
8.	"De Javu"	Eki "EQ" Puradiredja	E. Puradiredja	4:30
9.	"Satu Masa"	E. Puradiredja; A. Puradiredja; W. Puradiredja	W. Puradiredja	4:25
10.	"Yang Pertama"	A. Puradiredja; W. Puradiredja	W. Puradiredja	3:52
11.	"...Dan Ketika"	W. Puradiredja	W. Puradiredja	4:28
12.	"U & I"	W. Puradiredja; Imran Sulisto; Wisnuwardhana; Ifa Fachir	W. Puradiredja	5:08
13.	"Funk Flow!! (Organic Project Remix)" (bonus track)			5:43
14.	"Menikmati Cinta (Agrikulture Broken Remix)" (bonus track)			3:48
Total length:				1:02:13

Repackaged Edition
No.	Title	Lyrics	Music	Length
1.	"Dia"	W. Puradiredja; Pringgo Aryo Pradana	W. Puradiredja	4:23
2.	"Kau Yang Bisa"	Wisnuwardhana; W. Puradiredja; A. Puradiredja	W. Puradiredja; A. Puradiredja	4:09
3.	"Beri Cinta Waktu" (Reggae Version)			4:31
4.	"Funk Flow!!"			3:50
5.	"Heaven"			3:36
6.	"Free Your Mind"			5:09
7.	"Menikmati Cinta"			4:49
8.	"Masih Tersimpan"			4:27
9.	"Itu Adanya"			4:22
10.	"Beri Cinta Waktu"			4:12
11.	"De Javu"			4:30
12.	"Satu Masa"			4:25
13.	"Yang Pertama"			3:52
14.	"...Dan Ketika"			4:28
15.	"U & I"			5:08
Total length:				1:05:51

== Personnel ==
Maliq & D'Essentials

- Angga Puradiredja – lead vocals, backing vocals
- Indah Wisnuwardhana – lead vocals, backing vocals
- Widi Puradiredja – drums, synthesizers, Moog, synth bass
- Dendy "Javafinger" Sukarno – electric bass
- Satrio Moersid – electric guitar, acoustic guitar
- Ifa Fachir – Fender Rhodes, Hammond, Clavinet, piano
- Amar Ibrahim – trumpet, flugelhorn

Additional musicians

- Eki "EQ" Puradiredja – backing vocals (tracks 1, 7, 10 and 12), bass (track 8)
- Maya Hasan – harp (tracks 3, 7 and 11)
- Indra Lesmana – Mini Moog (track 7)
- Reza Jozef "Rejoz" Patty – percussion (tracks 2 and 8)
- Philippe Ciminato – percussion (tracks 4 and 10)
- Renita Martadinata – backing vocals (tracks 5, 6, 8, 10 and 11)
- Lawrence "Larry" Aswin – flute (tracks 5, 6 and 11)
- Pradana "Kyriz" Rizky – rap (track 1)

Production

- Eki "EQ" Puradiredja – producer, arranger
- Widi Puradiredja – co-producer, arranger, engineer (repackaged edition tracks 1 and 2)
- Angga Puradiredja – co-producer
- Lawrence "Larry" Aswin – engineer (except repackaged edition tracks 1 and 2)
- Indra Lesmana – mixing (tracks 2, 5, 6, 7, 8, 9, 11, 13 and 14), mastering
- Simon Cotsworth – mixing (tracks 1, 3, 4, 10 and 12)

== Release history ==
Release history for Free Your Mind
Region	Date	Version	Format	Label
Indonesia	February 26, 2007	Original	CD	Swara Bumi; Warner
Various	February 27, 2007	Original	Digital download; streaming	Warner
Indonesia	April 1, 2008	Repackage	CD	Swara Bumi; Warner
Various	April 1, 2008	Repackage	Digital download; streaming	Warner
