= D'Masiv =

Indonesian rock band

d'Masiv
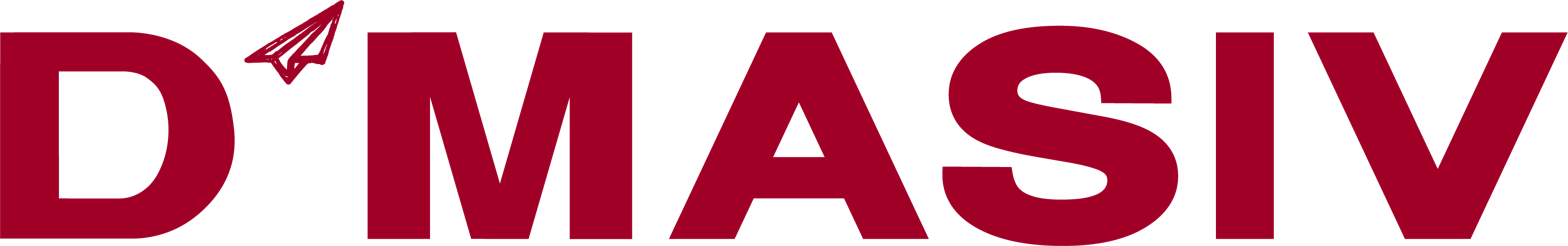

Background information
- Also known as: Massive (2003–2006)
- Origin: Jakarta, Indonesia
- Genres: Pop; pop rock; alternative rock; emo
- Years active: 2003–present
- Labels: Malta; Musica; MSV
- Members: Rian Ekky Pradipta; Dwikky Marsall; Rai Dinata; Nurul Damar Ramadhan; Wahyu Piaji
- Past members: Donny Adhitya; Ivan
- Website: dmasivband.com

d'Masiv (stylized all-uppercase since 2016 as D'MASIV) is an Indonesian rock band which based in Jakarta. It consists of 5 members: Rian Ekky Pradipta (vocal), Dwikky Aditya Marsall (guitar), Nurul Damar Ramadhan (guitar), Rayyi Kurniawan Iskandar Dinata (bass), and Wahyu Piadji (drums). D'Masiv has been compared with the Indonesian bands Ungu, Nidji, and Peterpan (now known as Noah) because of the popularity of their songs.

== History ==
d'Masiv was formed on March 3, 2003. d'Masiv's name is derived from the English word "massive" as a hope to be able to achieve the best possible results in the national music scene; while their original name was Massive. Their names began to soar after winning the competition music A Mild Live Wanted in 2007. D'Masiv released their first album titled Perubahan in 2008 with the song "Cinta Ini Membunuhku" as its flagship song. The song was so popular that more and toss their name in the national music scene. At the end of 2008, d'Masiv makes containers for his fans association with the names Masivers.

In November 2009, d'Masiv released the new EP which contains two songs titled "Minta Ampun Aku" and "Jangan Menyerah". According to Rian, vocalist for d'Masiv, making mini-albums released this very brief and to welcome the month Ramadan which falls in mid-August 2009.

== Band members ==
=== Current members ===
- Rian Ekky Pradipta — lead vocals, occasional rhythm guitar (2003–present)
- Dwikky Marsall (Kiki) — lead guitar, backing vocals (2003–present)
- Nurul Damar Ramadhan (Rama) — rhythm guitar (2006–present), keyboards (2003–2006, 2024–present), backing vocals (2003–present)
- Rai Dinata — bass guitar (2003–present)
- Wahyu Piaji (Why) — drums, percussion (2004–present)

=== Former members ===
- Donny Adhitya — rhythm guitar (2003–2006)
- Ivan — drums, percussion (2003–2004)

=== Additional members ===
- Robi — keyboards, synthesizer (2007–2013)
- Vegry Harindah Husain — keyboards, synthesizer, backing vocals (2014–2024)

== Discography ==
=== Studio albums ===
Title	Album details
Menuju Nirwana (as Massive)	Released: 2006; Label: Malta Music; Formats: CD, cassette
Perubahan	Released: September 3, 2008; Label: Musica Studio's; Formats: CD, digital download
Perjalanan	Released: January 2, 2010; Label: Musica Studio's; Formats: CD, digital download
Persiapan	Released: February 29, 2012; Label: Musica Studio's; Formats: CD, digital download
Hidup Lebih Indah	Released: July 1, 2014; Label: Musica Studio's; Formats: CD, digital download, vinyl (Limited)
d'Masiv^{[A]}	Released: October 13, 2016; Label: Musica Studio's; Format: CD, digital download
Love^{[A]}	Released: May 2, 2019; Label: Musica Studio's; Format: CD, digital download
Time	Released: February 25, 2022; Label: Musica Studio's; Format: CD, digital download
8	Released: May 19, 2024; Label: Musica Studio's; Format: CD, Digital Download

=== Compilation albums ===
Title	Album details
A Mild Live Wanted	Released: May 2007; Label: Musica Studio's; Format: CD
Indahnya Bulan Suci	Released: August 2011; Label: Musica Studio's; Format: CD
Kami Mengenang Rinto Harahap (with Various Artists)	Released: July 31, 2015; Label: Musica Studio's; Formats: CD, digital download
Satu (with Various Artists)	Released: November 20, 2015; Label: Musica Studio's; Formats: CD, digital download
Puspa Ragam Karya Guruh Sukarno Putra (With Various Artists)	Released: August 20, 2020; Label:Musica Studio's; Formats: CD, Digital Download

=== Soundtrack album ===
Title	Album details
OST Antologi Rasa	Released: January 2019; Label: Musica Studio's; Format: CD, digital download

=== Live album ===
Title	Album details
Jazz Project	Released: Maret 2013; Label: Musica Studio's; Format: CD, digital download
Acoustic Version ABBEY ROAD	Released: Agustus 2020; Label: Musica Studio's; Format: Digital Download
Electric Version ABBEY ROAD	Released: Agustus 2020; Label: Musica Studio's; Format: Digital Download

=== Extended plays ===
Title	EP details
Special Edition	Released: July 15, 2009; Label: Musica Studio's; Formats: CD, digital download

=== Singles ===
Title	Year	Peak chart positions	Album
Title	Year	IDN Hot 100	Album
"Tak Bisa Hidup Tanpamu"	2007	-	A Mild Live Wanted 2007
"Cinta Ini Membunuhku"	2008	—	Perubahan
"Di Antara Kalian"	2008	—	Perubahan
"Merindukanmu"	2008	—	Perubahan
"Cinta Sampai di Sini"	2008	—	Perubahan
"Diam Tanpa Kata"	2008	—	Perubahan
"Jangan Menyerah"	2009	—	Special Edition
"Mohon Ampun Aku"	2009	—	Special Edition
"Rindu 1/2 Mati"	2010	—	Perjalanan
"Sudahi Perih Ini"	2010	—	Perjalanan
"Apa Salahku"	2010	—	Perjalanan
"Semakin"	2010	—	Perjalanan
"Jangan Pergi"	2011	—	Perjalanan
"Beri Kami yang Terbaik"	2011	—	Persiapan
"Damai"	2011	—	Persiapan
"Natural"	2012	—	Persiapan
"Pergilah Kasih"	2012	—	Persiapan
"Aku Kehilanganmu"	2012	—	Persiapan
"Nyaman"	2013	—	Persiapan
"Salah Paham"	2013	—	Hidup Lebih Indah
"Esok Kan Bahagia" (featuring Momo Sinaga of Geisha, Giring Ganesha of Nidji, and Ariel of Noah)	2014	—	Hidup Lebih Indah
"Cahaya Hati"	2014	—	Hidup Lebih Indah
"Batu"	2014	—	Hidup Lebih Indah
"PD"	2015	—	Hidup Lebih Indah
"Kau yang Ku Sayang" (originally by Rinto Harahap)	2015	—	Kami Mengenang Rinto Harahap
"Tala'al Badru" (with Raef)	2016	—	D'Masiv with Raef
"Di Bawah Langit yang Sama"	2016	—	d'Masiv
"Dengarlah Sayang"	2016	—	d'Masiv
"Melodi"	2017	—	d'Masiv
"Taman SurgaMu"	2017	—	Non-album single
"Tak Punya Nyali"	2017	—	d'Masiv
"Pernah Memiliki" (with Rossa featuring David Noah)	2018	—	Love
"Selamat Jalan Kekasih" (with Chrisye featuring Maizura)	2018	—	Love
"Ingin Lekas Memelukmu Lagi" (featuring Pusakata)	2018	—	Love
"Doa" (featuring Shakira Jasmine)	2019	—	Non-album single
"Lelaki Pantang Menyerah"	2019	80	Love
"Kala Sang Surya Tenggelam"	2020	—	Non-album single
"Bersama Kita Kuat"	2020	—	Non-album single
"Waktu yang Menjawab"	2021	—	Time
"Kau yang Tak Pernah Tahu" (featuring Fariz RM)	2021	—	Time
"Sinema" (featuring Fiersa Besari)	2022	—	Time
"Sahabat Jadi Kekasih" (featuring Rayen Pono and Regina Poetiray)	2022	—	Time
"Side by Side" (featuring QoryGore)	2023	—	Time
"Besok" (featuring Feel Koplo)	2023	—	Time
"Sampai Mati 'kan Ku Kejar"	2024	—	8
"Bahagia Sejak Pertama"	2025	—	Non-album single
"On Our Own"	2026	—	TBA

==== As featured artist ====
Title	Year	Album Artist
"Abadi" (featuring D'Masiv, Noah, Geisha, Nidji)	2016	Iwan Fals
"Satu-satunya" (featuring D'Masiv)	2016	Iwan Fals
"Kemesraan"	2016	Iwan Fals

== Awards and nominations ==
Year	Nominee / work	Award	Result
2008	D'Masiv	MTV Indonesia Awards — Most Breakthrough Artist	Won
2009	D'Masiv	Anugerah Planet Muzik — Best Duo/Group Newcomer	Nominated
2009	D'Masiv	Anugerah Planet Muzik — Favourite Indonesian Artist	Nominated
2009	D'Masiv	MTV Indonesia Awards — Best Artist Of The Year	Nominated
2009	D'Masiv	MTV Indonesia Awards — Most Favorite Band/Group/Duo	Nominated
2010	D'Masiv	Indonesian Music Awards — Best Pop Duo/Group	Won
2010	D'Masiv	Dahsyatnya Awards — Outstanding Band	Nominated
2010	"Jangan Menyerah"	Indonesian Music Awards — Best Pop Song	Won
2010	"Jangan Menyerah"	Indonesian Music Awards — Best of the Best Production	Won
2010	"Jangan Menyerah"	Dahsyatnya Awards — Outstanding Song	Nominated
2010	"Jangan Menyerah"	Dahsyatnya Awards — Outstanding Video Clip	Won
2010	Special Edition	Indonesian Music Awards — Best Pop Album	Nominated
2011	D'Masiv	Indonesian Music Awards — Best Pop Duo/Group	Nominated
2011	Perjalanan	Indonesian Music Awards — Best Pop Album	Nominated
2011	Perjalanan	Indonesian Music Awards — Best of the Best Album	Nominated
2014	D'Masiv	Indonesian Music Awards — Best Pop Duo/Group	Nominated
2015	Rian D'Masiv – "Jadi Matahari"	Indonesian Music Awards — Best Children Songwriter	Nominated
2017	D'Masiv	Dahsyatnya Awards — Outstanding Band	Nominated
2017	"Satu-Satunya" (featuring Iwan Fals)	Dahsyatnya Awards — Outstanding Song	Nominated
2017	D'Masiv (featuring Iwan Fals)	Dahsyatnya Awards — Outstanding Duet/Collaboration	Won

== Notes ==
^{A} The album can also called as Orange Album.
