= Mata Hati Telinga =

Studio album by Maliq & D'Essentials
- Released: March 8, 2009
- Recorded: 2009
- Studio: Organic Lab (Jakarta)
- Genre: Pop
- Length: 26:15
- Language: Indonesian
- Labels: Organic Records; Warner Music Indonesia
- Producer: Eki "EQ" Puradiredja

Maliq & D'Essentials chronology
Free Your Mind (2007)	Mata Hati Telinga (2009)	The Beginning of a Beautiful Life (2010)

Mata Hati Telinga is the third album from Indonesian pop group Maliq & D'Essentials. Released on 8 March 2009, it is the band's first album with guitarist Arya "Lale" Aditya, who replaced Satrio Moersid in 2008. It is also the last album to feature Amar Ibrahim as a full member of the band, though he continues to perform live with them whenever available and has contributed trumpet and flugelhorn to subsequent studio albums.

== Track listing ==
Music and lyrics by Widi Puradiredja unless otherwise stated.

No.	Title	Lyrics	Music	Length
1.	"Aura"	Widi Puradiredja; Angga Puradiredja; Indah Wisnuwardhana		5:07
2.	"Luluh"			4:12
3.	"Kita Jatuh Cinta"			5:08
4.	"Pilihanku"			3:26
5.	"Coba Katakan"	W. Puradiredja; Dendy "Javafinger" Sukarno; A. Puradiredja; Wisnuwardhana		3:55
6.	"Mata Hati Telinga"	W. Puradiredja; A. Puradiredja; Wisnuwardhana	Arya "Lale" Aditya	4:27
Total length:				26:15

== Personnel ==
Maliq & D'Essentials

- Angga Puradiredja – vocals
- Indah Wisnuwardhana – vocals
- Widi Puradiredja – drums, Moog
- Dendy "Javafinger" Sukarno – bass
- Ifa Fachir – keyboards
- Amar Ibrahim – trumpet
- Arya "Lale" Aditya – guitar

Additional musicians

- Ricky Lionardi – orchestra arrangement and orchestration (track 1)
- Eugene Bounty – alto saxophone and clarinet (tracks 2 and 3)
- Enggar Widodo – trombone and tuba (tracks 2 and 3)
- Reza Jozef "Rejoz" Patty – percussion (tracks 2 and 3)

Production

- Eki "EQ" Puradiredja – producer
- Indra Lesmana – mixing and mastering
- Widi Puradiredja – engineer
- Dendy "Javafinger" Sukarno – engineer
