= 2017 Dahsyatnya Awards =

Indonesian music awards ceremony in 2017

- Date: January 25, 2017
- Location: Ecopark Ocean Ecovention Ancol, Pademangan, North Jakarta
- Hosted by: Raffi Ahmad; Ayu Dewi; Denny Cagur; Syahnaz Sadiqah; Anwar Sanjaya; Felycia Angelistya

Highlights
- Most awards: Afgan (2)
- Most nominations: Tulus (6)

Television/radio coverage
- Network: RCTI

The 2017 Dahsyatnya Awards, honoring the best in music and entertainment (or popular culture) for 2017, was held on January 25, 2017, at the Ecopark Ocean Ecovention Ancol in Pademangan, North Jakarta. It was broadcast live on RCTI. It's the ninth annual show and was hosted by Raffi Ahmad, Ayu Dewi, Denny Cagur, Syahnaz Sadiqah, Anwar Sanjaya and Felycia Angelistya. The ceremonies awards were held the theme for "We Are Dahsyat" and presenting 14 categories award, including special award and a new category to Outstanding EDM.

Tulus led the nominations with six categories, followed Isyana Sarasvati and Raisa Andriana, both of earned four nominations. Afgan has become biggest winner for taking home two awards, including Outstanding Song for "Kunci Hati".

== Performances ==
Artist(s)	Song(s)
Main show
Iwa K GAC	"Bebas"
Armada; Denny Cagur	"Pulang Malu Tak Pulang Rindu"
Ayu Ting Ting; Duo Racun Youbi Sisters; Duo Serigala; Julia Perez; Trio Macan	Sing the nominees of "Outstanding Dangdut Singer" song
Wali	"Doakan Ya Penonton" "Ada Gajah Dibalik Batu"
All host	"Ingatlah Hari Ini"
Al Ghazali; Rizky Febian	"Penantian Berharga"
JKT48	"Luar Biasa"
Mytha Lestari; Fatin Shidqia	"Aku Cuma Punya Hati" "Salahkan Aku Terlalu Mencintaimu"
Project Pop	"Ingatlah Hari Ini"
Afgan; Rossa	"Kunci Hati" "Jangan Tinggalkan Dia"
Fatin Shidqia; Rizky Febian	Sing the nominees of "Outstanding Song"

== Presenters ==
- Ayu Dewi, Syahnaz Sadqah, Raffi Ahmad and Felycia Angelistya – Presented Outstanding Duo/Group
- Raffi Ahmad, Anwar Sanjaya and Dunia Terbalik cast – Presented Outstanding Dangdut Singer
- Raffi Ahmad, Denny Cagur, Syahnaz Sadiqah, Anwar Sanjaya and Felycia Angelistya – Presented Outstanding Male Solo Singer
- Raffi Ahmad, Denny Cagur, Syahnaz Sadiqah, Anwar Sanjaya and Felycia Angelistya – Presented Outstanding Female Solo Singer
- Raffi Ahmad, Denny Cagur and Ayu Dewi – Presented Lifetime Achievement Award
- Raffi Ahmad, Syahnaz Sadiqah, Felycia Angelistya, Anwar Sanjaya, Denny Cagur and Dunia Terbalik – Presented Outstanding Video Clip
- Syahnaz Sadiqah, Felycia Angelistya and Anwar Sanjaya – Presented Outstanding Guest Star
- Raffi Ahmad and Denny Cagur – Presented Outstanding EDM
- Raffi Ahmad and Denny Cagur – Presented Outstanding Band
- Raffi Ahmad, Ayu Dewi, Denny Cagur, Syahnaz Sadiqah, Anwar Sanjaya and Felycia Angelistya – Presented Outstanding Song

== Winners and nominees ==
The nominees were announced on January 2, 2017. Winners are listed first and highlighted.

=== Website vote and SMS ===
Outstanding Song	Outstanding Band
"Kunci Hati" — Afgan; "Cinta" — GAC; "Jakarta Ramai" – Maudy Ayunda; "Kali Kedua" — Raisa; "Mimpi" — Isyana Sarasvati; "Mungkin Suatu Hari" — Bunga Citra Lestari; "Pamit" — Tulus; "Pelangi" — HiVi!; "Satu-Satunya" – D'Masiv (featuring Iwan Fals)	Noah; ADA Band; Armada; D'Masiv; Kotak; Lyla; The Rain; Wali
Outstanding Male Solo Singer	Outstanding Female Solo Singer
Afgan; Anji; Kunto Aji; Rizky Febian; Tulus	Rossa; Bunga Citra Lestari; Isyana Sarasvati; Maudy Ayunda; Raisa
Outstanding Duet/Collaboration	Outstanding Duo/Group
D'Masiv (featuring Iwan Fals); Melly Goeslaw (featuring Marthino Lio); Nidji (featuring Iwan Fals)	GAC; HiVi!; RAN; The Overtunes
Outstanding Child Artist	Outstanding Dangdut Singer
Chelsea Idola Cilik; Diego Robbana; Lyodra and Olivola; Naura; Romaria; Zara Leola	Ayu Ting Ting; Duo Racun Youbi Sisters; Duo Serigala; Iis Dahlia; Julia Perez; Trio Macan
Outstanding Guests Star	Outstanding EDM
Astro; B-Brave; Peabo Bryson; Silent Siren	Soundwave; Midnight Quickie; Monostereo; Volmax; Wildeones

=== Jury ===
Outstanding Music Video	Outstanding Model in a Music Video
"Mimpi" — Isyana Sarasvati; "Cinta" — GAC; "Intuisi" — Yura Yunita; "Kali Kedua" — Raisa; "Monokrom" — Tulus; "Pamit" — Tulus	Melati Suryodarmo — "Ruang Sendiri" (performed by Tulus); Afgan and Lutesha — "Jalan Terus" (performed by Afgan); Agnez Mo — "Sebuah Rasa" (performed by Agnez Mo); Gisella Anastasia and Rio Dewanto — "Cara Lupakanmu" (performed by Gisella Anastasia); Yura Yunita and Reza Rahadian — "Intuisi" (performed by Yura Yunita)
Outstanding Music Video Director	Lifetime Achievement Award
Davy Linggar — "Monokrom" (performed by Tulus); Candi Soeleman — "Mimpi" (performed by Isyana Sarasvati); Davy Linggar — "Kali Kedua" (performed by Raisa); Erix Soekamti — "Hidup Yang Hebat" (performed by Nidji (featuring Iwan Fals)); Galih Mulya Nugraha — "Ruang Sendiri" (performed by Tulus); Gamaliel Tapiheru — "Cinta" (performed by GAC)	Project Pop
