= Edane (band) =

Indonesian band

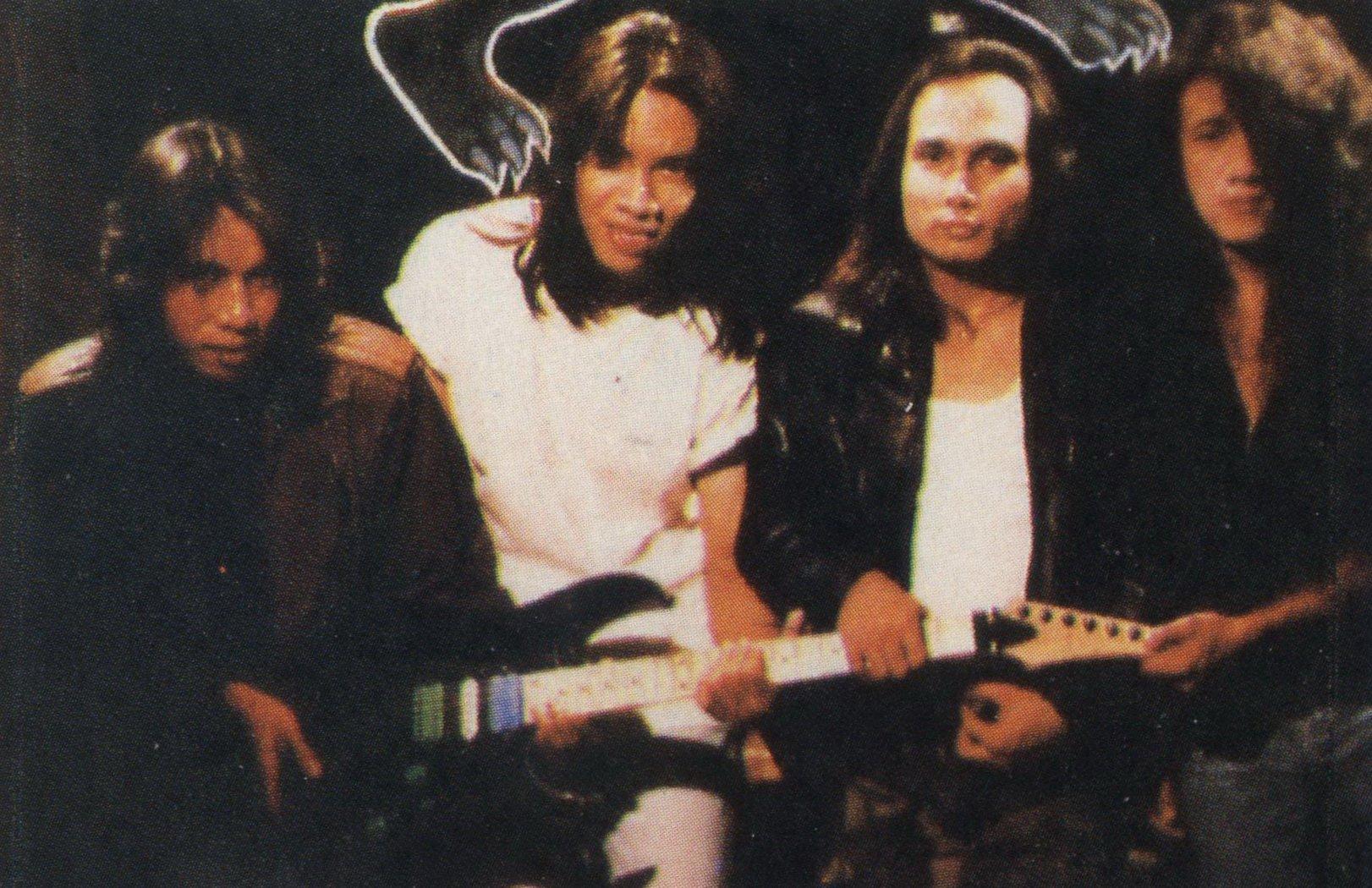
- Edane early formation in 1992. Eet Sjahranie, Fajar Satritama, Ecky Lamoh and Iwan Xaverius.

Background information
- Genres: Hard rock heavy metal glam metal (early)
- Years active: 1991–present
- Labels: AIRO, Aquarius Musikindo, Sony Music Indonesia, Sony BMG Indonesia, Logiss Records
- Members: Eet Sjahranie; Fajar Satritama; Hendra Zamzami; Ervin Nanzabakri; Arie Ria
- Past members: Ecky Lamoh; Heri Batara; Trison Manurung; Iwan Xaverius; Robbie Matulandi; Daeng Oktav

Edane (writing style: EdanE) (/ˈɛdɑːnˈɛ/) is an Indonesian rock band from Jakarta, formed 1991 by Eet Sjahranie (/ˈɛˈɛt/ /ˈʃɑːhrɑːni/) in the golden era of the Indonesian rock and metal music scene during the 1990s. The band has released six studio album and one compilation album over nearly three decades.

Their existence has become one of the most influential bands in today's Indonesian music scene and achieved the most prestigious award in Indonesian music industry Anugerah Musik Indonesia (AMI) and Hammersonic Awards. Meanwhile for international presence, Edane's song "Cry Out" was included in the official soundtrack of Spider-Man 2 (2004).

== History ==
Edane was formed in 1991 when the project duo Eet Sjahranie and Ekki Soekarno, that named after both their initials (E & E) did not continue for one reason or another. Both Eet and Ekki were involved earlier in the 'Kharisma Indonesia' collaboration project that initiated by Ekki in 1988. Eet then continued the 'E & E' project duo with Ecky Lamoh that also involved in the same project of 'Kharisma Indonesia' earlier and kept the duo name 'E & E' due to the same initials. However the duo project of Eet and Ecky were also stalled, then transformed into a band with additional members of Fajar Satritama (drum) and Iwan Xaverius (bass) where Eet as guitarist and Ecky as vocalist, then the band's name became EdanE. Almost three decades of their musical journey, Edane often change their vocalist for some reasons, but today's line up of Edane that musical style influenced by Pantera, Van Halen and AC/DC fronted by Eet (guitar), Fajar (drum), Ervin (vocal), Hendra (guitar) and Oktav (bass).

Edane's fans formed a community through social media to kept updates of the news, activities and related information of the band including live schedules, releases and merchandise trades. The community known as 'Edane Freaks', to unite all the members that spread throughout Indonesia.

=== 1991–1992: Early formation dan The Beast ===
Early formation of Edane was fronted by Eet (guitar), Fajar (drum), Ecky (vocal) and Iwan (bass) then soon released their debut album titled The Beast on May 10, 1992 through the label of AIRO Records. Produced by Edane with Setiawan Djody as an executive producer (AIRO) and Jimmy Doto as producer that consists of nine songs started by "Evolusi" as an intro and ended by "You Don't Have to Tell Me Lies". A number of musicians collaborated in the making of this album including Eet's bandmate Iwan Madjid on keyboard for "Evolusi" and Moesya Yoenoes also keyboard for "Masihkah Ada Senyum" dan "Life". Indonesian senior musician Sawung Jabo were also contributed for the song writing of "The Beast" and Tontowy for "Ikuti" ["Follow"] and "Menang Atau Tergilas" ["Win or Run-Over"]. Two months after the debut, Edane was lined up to be the opening act for the Brazilian metal band Sepultura live concert titled ‘Sepultura World Tour 1992’ in Lebak Bulus Stadium, Jakarta on July 8, 1992. The Beast received a positive response and high appreciation in the Indonesian music scene and included in the list of 150 Best Indonesian Albums of all time in 2007 and one of the songs in the album "Ikuti" included in the list of 150 Best Indonesian Songs of all time in 2009 both awarded by Rolling Stone Indonesia Magazine. This album has been reissued, both as CD and Cassette tape format in 2006 through the label of Aquarius Musikindo. Shortly thereafter, in the middle of album's success, Ecky Lamoh left the band (later on he joined his former band, Elpamas). Then his position replaced by Heri Batara (also known as Ucok (/ˈuːtʃɒk/)) as vocalist.

=== 1993–1996: Jabrik dan Borneo ===
Following the success of their previous debut, Edane launched Jabrik in 1994 under the label Aquarius Musikindo. This second studio album was produced by Edane with Jimmy Doto as an executive producer. Jabrik consists of twelve song compositions, opened by "Wake of The Storm" then ended by "Kurusetra" and collaborate with musicians such as Sawung Jabo, Tagor S, JP Patton dan Tontowy. Two years later in 1996, Edane released their third studio album titled Borneo that consists of a compositions of eight songs that opens with traditional Kalimantan music titled Borneo I and "Satu" [one] as the ending song. Vocalist Heri Batara was in an unfit condition during recording process of this album, most of the vocal recording portion was taken over by session vocalist, Fatah Mardiko (Tempakul Band).

=== 1997–2003: 9299 dan 170 Volts ===
Edane launched their fourth studio album in 1999 titled 9299 through the label of Aquarius Musikindo. This compilation album consists of the best selection of songs from the previous albums with three new songs of "Rock On", "Dengarkan Aku" [listen to me] and "Untuk Dunia" [for the world].

After a decade with the band, Heri Batara stepped down from Edane to focus on the band behind the scene, then his position was replaced by Trison Manurung (Roxx band) as vocalist through an audition. Soon after that, the new line-up released the fifth studio album of 170 Volts through the label of Sony Music Indonesia in 2002. The work of this album was begun around 2001 in a studio designated by the label, that consists of twelve songs started by "Zep 170 Volts" and "Paraelite" as the ending, with "Kau Pikir Kaulah Segalanya? (Kau Maniz Kau Ibliz)" [You Think You're Everything? (You're Cute, You're Devil)] as popular song. The making of this album is fairly fast with limited recording facilities and equipments, resulting in a relatively low quality of sound compared to the previous albums with more riffs or solid state rhythm than a 'lead' parts that usually fill every Edane songs.

During this period, Edane is still looking for an additional vocalist by holding an audition to bring old Edane song from the previous albums in their live performances. This resulted Trison's disappointment and disagree to have an additional or secondary vocalist even though his vocal character was different from Edane's previous vocalists, because Trison argued that he joined the band through a strict audition process and agreement of all parties, including Edane's management. Related to this issue, Trison finally left Edane in mid–2003 and returned to his old band Roxx. Then his position was replaced by Robbie Matulandi (Razzle Band).

=== 2003-2005: Time To Rock ===
The process of joining Robbie to Edane began when he first met with the producer from Sony Music Indonesia that oversees Edane then followed by tour and live performances bring back Edane's song from the album The Beast to 170 Volts. Then the line up involved in 'Indonesian Voices' collaboration project of compilation album released by the label titled Tribute to Ian Antono by covering the song of God Bless titled "Bla–Bla–Bla". Then Edane was lined up to make a theme song that would be included in Spider-Man 2 (soundtrack) compilation for distribution in Asia by Sony Music Indonesia, then the single titled "Cry Out" was born.

Soon after the success of "Cry Out", Edane released their sixth studio album titled Time To Rock on 20 June 2005 through the label of Sony BMG Indonesia, that consists of eleven song compositions begin with "Rock in 82" and ended by "Untuk Dunia (Intro)" ["For The World (Intro)"] with "Cry Out" included in the album. One of the popular songs in this album titled "Rock in 82" was the reflection of Eet's adolescence which describe in the form of a song.

Shortly after the release Time To Rock, the formation did not last long with Robbie resignation together with Iwan who had joined the band since the beginning, leaving Eet and Fajar. Until Edane was in hiatus and disappeared from circulation entering the era of consolidation, although there were several off-air activities conducting unofficial selections and auditions for vocals and bass line.

=== 2010 – present ===
Edane rose again after five years in hiatus to hit the Indonesian music scene at end of 2010 by releasing their seventh studio album titled Edan /ˈɛdɑːn/ (meaning crazy in javanese). This album was released on 4 December 2010 through Logiss Records with Log Zhelebour as producer that consists of nine new song compositions, intro and plus two songs in 'minus-one' format. This breakthrough makes "Living Dead" and "Best Of Me" becomes hits including "Jadi Beken" ["Become Famous"] that the only song written in Bahasa Indonesia since Edane wants to be listened globally by making most of their songs written in English. This album Edan was included in the list of best Indonesian music album by Rolling Stone Magazine Indonesia in 2011.

Edane new formation that consists of Eet (guitar), Fajar (drum), Hendra (guitar), Oktav (bass) and Ervin (vocal), repeating the two decades history of being the opening live performances of Brazilian metal band Sepultura in the event of "Kukar Rockin' Fest" on 9 November 2012 at the Aji Imbut Stadium, East Kalimantan. Edane was originally going to be appear as the headliner at the event, but after Sepultura confirmed their presence, Edane finally became the opening act and one of the main guest stars. This event was also awarded from Indonesian World Records Museum (MURI) as "The First Free International Music Festival" in Indonesia.

Stepping into 2015, Edane released a single titled "Hail Edan". The song tells the story about 'Hail' or greetings and 'Edan' meaning crazy in javanese or can be describing something with an expression. "Hail Edan" was distributed online free of charge for 'Edane Freaks' (Edane fans) in order to reach Edane's next mini album. This single was released independently since Edane left the label. The idea of "Hail Edan" was originated from Edane's schedule to be the opening band of Sepultura live concert in Kuala Lumpur in 2012, wanting to have song to salute fans in Malaysia. However, for one reason or another, Sepultura canceled the performance and switched their performance to "Kukar Rockin' Fest", so that the production of "Hail Edan" was delayed until its release in 2015.

Edane release another single on 1 August 2020 distributed by Greenland Indonesia, titled "Si Bangsat (Sesuka Lo)" [The Bastard (As You Like)] in collaboration with Bagus (NTRL) as the songwriter and also provided vocals at the end of the song. The idea of the collaboration started when Edane and NTRL met in the event of "Jogjarockarta 2019" on 3 November 2019 at the Kridosono Stadium, Yogyakarta until the process of working on the single together.

== Band members ==
=== Current members ===
- Eet Sjahranie – guitar, backing vocals (1991–present)
- Fajar Satritama – drums, percussion (1991–present)
- Hendra Zamzami – guitar, backing vocals (2010–present)
- Ervin Nanzabakri – lead vocals (2010–present)
- Arie Ria;- bassist (2022-present)

=== Former members ===
- Ecky Lamoh – lead vocals (1991–1992) (died 2025)
- Heri Batara – lead vocals (1992–2002)
- Trison Manurung – lead vocals (2002–2003)
- Robbie Matulandi – lead vocals (2003–2005)
- Iwan Xaverius – bass, backing vocals (1991–2005; died 2024)
- Daeng Oktav – bass, backing vocals (2010–2021)

=== Additional/session musicians ===
- Fatah Mardiko – vocals (1996–1997)
- Reza Trezzlle – vocals (2002–2003)
- Adit RK – vocals (2005–2006)

== Discography ==
Edane discography
- Studio albums: 6
- Soundtrack albums: 2
- Compilation albums: 1
- Singles: 3
- Music videos: 6

=== Album studio ===
- The Beast (1992)
- Jabrik (1994)
- Borneo (1996)
- 170 Volts (2002)
- Time To Rock (2005)
- Edan (2010)

=== Compilation ===
- 9299 (1999)

=== Singles ===
- "Rock in 82" (2005)
- "Hail Edan" (2015)
- "Si Bangsat (Sesuka Lo)" (2020)

=== Soundtracks ===
- "Cry Out" – Spider-Man 2 (2004)
- "Saksi Anarki" – D'Bijis (2007)

== Awards and nominations ==
| Year | Award | Category | Nominee(s) | Result | Ref. |
|---|---|---|---|---|---|
| 2017 | Anugerah Musik Indonesia (AMI) Awards | Metal/Hardcore Production Work | "Hail Edan" | Nominated | |
| 2016 | Hammersonic Awards | Lifetime Achievement | EDANE | Won | |
| 2012 | Indonesia Cutting Edge Awards (ICEMA) | Best Metal Song | "Living Dead" | Nominated | |
| 2011 | Anugerah Musik Indonesia (AMI) Awards | Best Rock Album | Edan | Won | |
