= Rinto Harahap =

Indonesian singer and actress

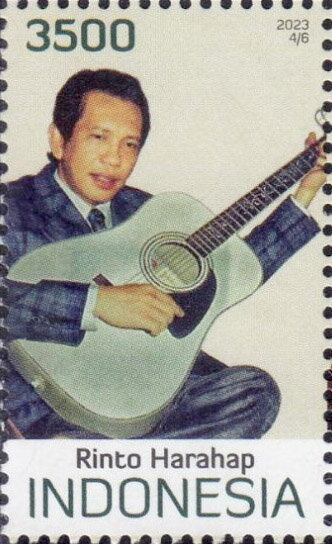
- Harahap on a 2023 stamp of Indonesia
- Born: 10 March 1949; Sibolga, Indonesia
- Died: 9 February 2015 (aged 65); Singapore
- Occupation: Singer-songwriter

Rinto Harahap (10 March 1949 – 9 February 2015) was an Indonesian musician and ballad singer. Between 1969 and 2014 he composed more than 500 songs.

== Personal life ==
Harahap was of Batak heritage and had an elder brother Erwin. In 1969, together with Erwin, Charles Hutagalung and Reynold Panggabean he founded a band named The Mercy's.

Harahap died of spinal tumor aged 65 in Mount Elizabeth Hospital in Singapore. He was survived by his wife, Lily Kuslotita, and children Cindy, Ratna and Aci.

== Discography ==
- Kami Mengenang Rinto Harahap (2015)
