= ADA Band =

Indonesian pop rock band

Ada Band
- Origin: Jakarta, Indonesia
- Genres: Pop rock; slow rock; classical rock; alternative rock; pop
- Years active: 1996–present
- Labels: Bulletin; BMG; EMI; Universal; Groovy; Astaswara
- Members: Indra Sinaga; Marshal S. Rachman; Dika Satjadibrata; Adhy Pratama
- Past members: Iso Eddy; E'el Ritonga; Baim; Rama Moektio; Krishna Balagita; Donnie Sibarani
- Website: adabandofficial.com

Ada Band is an Indonesian pop rock band formed in Jakarta in 1996. The group currently consists of Indra Sinaga (vocals), Marshal Surya Rachman (guitars), Dika Satjadibrata (bass) & Adhy Pratama (drums).

Ada Band are known for their hit singles, such as "Manusia Bodoh", "Yang Terbaik Bagimu", "Masih", "Seharusnya", "Ough" & "Bilakah". The first album titled Seharusnya (Should), released in 1997. Their 2004 work, Heaven of Love, was the band's key seller, going quadruple platinum in their home nation.

== Band members ==
=== Current members ===
- Indra Sinaga – lead vocals (2020–present; touring member 2019)
- Marshal S. Rachman – guitars, occasional backing vocals (2002–present)
- Dika Satjadibrata – bass, backing and occasional lead vocals (1996–present)
- Adhy Pratama – drums (2010–present)

=== Former members ===
- Iso Eddy – keyboards, backing vocals (1996–2000)
- E'el (Elif Ritonga) – drums, backing vocals (1996–2000)
- Baim (Ibrahim Imran) – lead vocals, guitars (1996–2001)
- Rama Moektio – drums (2000–2004)
- Krishna Balagita – keyboards, piano, backing and occasional lead vocals (1996–2008)
- Donnie Sibarani – lead vocals (2002–2017)

== Discography ==
=== Studio albums ===
Title	Album details	Sales	Certifications
Seharusnya	Released: 1997; Label: Bulletin; Formats: CD, cassette	70,000+	ASIRI: Gold
Peradaban 2000	Released: Juli 1999; Label: BMG; Formats: CD, cassette	100,000+	ASIRI: Gold
Tiara	Released: March 2001; Label: BMG; Formats: CD, cassette	80,000+	ASIRI: Gold
Metamorphosis	Released: 1 September 2002; Label: EMI; Formats: CD, cassette, digital download	300,000+	ASIRI: 2× Platinum
Heaven of Love	Released: 28 October 2004; Label: EMI; Formats: CD, cassette, digital download	900,000+	ASIRI: 6× Platinum
Romantic Rhapsody	Released: 1 April 2006; Label: EMI; Formats: CD, cassette, digital download	600,000+	ASIRI: 4× Platinum
Cinema Story	Released: 14 July 2007; Label: EMI; Formats: CD, cassette, digital download	—N/a	—N/a
Harmonious	Released: 2 July 2008; Label: EMI; Formats: CD, digital download	—N/a	—N/a
Mystery of Musical	Released: 18 July 2009; Label: Arka-EMI; Formats: CD, digital download	—N/a	—N/a
Empati	Released: 8 August 2011; Label: Universal; Formats: CD, digital download	—N/a	—N/a
Chemistry	Released: 23 March 2016; Label: Groovy; Formats: CD, digital download	—N/a	—N/a
Love, Hope, and Reality	Released: 22 August 2025; Label: Self-released; Format: Digital download	—N/a	—N/a

=== Compilation albums ===
Title	Album details	Sales	Certifications
The Best of ADA Band	Released: 1 January 2001; Label: BMG; Formats: CD, cassette	—N/a	—N/a
Discography	Released: 22 December 2003; Label: EMI; Formats: CD, cassette, digital download	200,000+	ASIRI: Platinum
Masa Demi Masa	Released: 8 April 2013; Label: Universal; Formats: CD, digital download	150,000+	ASIRI: 10× Platinum

== Awards and nominations ==
Year	Nominee / work	Award	Result
2006	Romantic Rhapsody	Indonesian Music Awards — Best of the Best Album	Nominated
2006	ADA Band	Indonesian Music Awards — Best Pop Duo/Group	Nominated
2007	"Surga Cinta"	SCTV Awards — Famous Music Video	Nominated
2007	ADA Band	SCTV Awards — Famous Group Band	Nominated
2011	ADA Band	Indonesian Music Awards — Best Pop Duo/Group	Nominated
2014	"Intim Berdua"	Dahsyatnya Awards — Outstanding Song	Nominated
2014	ADA Band	Dahsyatnya Awards — Outstanding Band	Nominated
2014	ADA Band	Dahsyatnya Awards — Outstanding Stage Act	Nominated
2015	ADA Band	Dahsyatnya Awards — Outstanding Band	Nominated
2017	ADA Band	Dahsyatnya Awards — Outstanding Band	Nominated
