= Kami Mengenang Rinto Harahap =

Kami Mengenang Rinto Harahap - EP

Compilation album by NOAH, Geisha, Nidji and d'Masiv
- Released: 2015
- Genre: Indo Pop, Alternative
- Length: 15:28
- Label: Musica Studios

Singles from Kami Mengenang Rinto Harahap
- 1. "Seandainya Aku Punya Sayap" Released: July, 2015; 2. "Cinta Bukan Dusta by NOAH" Released: July 27, 2015; 3. "Kau Yang Ku Sayang by d'Masiv" Released: September 2015

Kami Mengenang Rinto Harahap is a compilation album featuring the works of Rinto Harahap.

Harahap, a noted Indonesian singer, died in February 2015. To commemorate his death a number of young musicians gathered to record his songs. Produced by the Recording Industry Association of Indonesia (ASIRI), Kami Mengenang Rinto Harahap features performances by NOAH, Geisha , Nidji and d'Masiv.

All profits from the sale of this album will be given to Harahap's family.

== Track list ==
No.	Title	Artist	Length
1.	"Cinta Bukan Dusta (Love Do not Lie)"	NOAH	3:53
2.	"Seandainya Aku Punya Sayap (If I Had Wings)"	Geisha	4:23
3.	"Love (Love)"	Nidji	3:49
4.	"Kau Yang Ku Sayang (You are my darling)"	d'Masiv	4:03
Total length:			15:28
