= Sriwedari =

2013 album by Maliq & D'Essentials

Studio album by Maliq & D'Essentials
- Released: 25 January 2013
- Recorded: 2012
- Genre: Jazz; soul; funk; pop
- Length: 32:45
- Label: Organic Records
- Producer: Eki Puradiredja

Maliq & D'Essentials chronology
The Beginning of a Beautiful Life (2010)	Sriwedari (2013)	Musik Pop (2014)

Sriwedari is the fifth studio album by the Indonesian pop group Maliq & D'Essentials. The album was released on 25 January 2013 by their own independent company, Organic Records, and was produced by Eki Puradiredja. It is their first album with keyboardist Ilman Ibrahim, who joined the band in 2011. Two editions were released: a standard edition and a limited edition of 2000 copies sold through Blibli.com.

The album was nominated for "Album of the Year" at the 1st Indonesian Choice Awards, but lost to Raisa's Heart to Heart.

== Background ==
After releasing their compilation album Radio Killed The TV Star in 2012, the group planned to make a greatest hits album with an additional three new songs. In the end they wrote 10 new songs, and decided to create a new album.

== Track listing ==
Music and lyrics by Maliq & D'Essentials unless otherwise stated.

No.	Title	Music	Length
1.	"Sing! Make It Last Forever"	Widi Puradiredja	04:24
2.	"Setapak Sriwedari"	W. Puradiredja	04:10
3.	"Drama Romantika"		05:14
4.	"Menghilang"		04:25
5.	"Dunia Sekitar"		03:25
6.	"Beautiful Disaster"		04:16
7.	"Janji"	W. Puradiredja	03:31
8.	"Inilah Kita"		04:00
Total length:			32:45

== Awards and nominations ==
Year	Award	Category	Result
2014	Indonesian Choice Awards	Album of the Year	Nominated

== Personnel ==
Maliq & D'Essentials

- Angga Puradiredja - vocals
- Indah Wisnuwardhana - vocals
- Widi Puradiredja - drums
- Dendy "Javafinger" Sukarno - bass
- Arya "Lale" Aditya - guitar
- Ilman Ibrahim - keyboards

Additional musicians

- Reza Jozef "Rejoz" Patty - percussion
- Amar Ibrahim - trumpet, flugelhorn
- Henricus - tabla
- Hary Wisnu Yuniarta - flute, oboe

Production

- Eki "EQ" Puradiredja - producer
- Widi Puradiredja - producer, mixing, engineer
- Dendy "Javafinger" Sukarno - mixing, engineer
- Geoff Pesche - mastering
