= Sarjana Muda =

Studio album by Iwan Fals
- Released: 1981
- Label: Musica

Sarjana Muda (Indonesian: Young Graduate) is the solo debut album of Iwan Fals, released in 1981 by Musica. The lyrics of many of its songs focus on the daily life of ordinary Indonesians, and subtly challenge the political leadership of Suharto, who remained in power until 1998.

The album, which contains many of Iwan Fals' most popuar songs, was named as number 27 of "The 150 Greatest Indonesian Albums of All Time" by Indonesian Rolling Stone magazine.

The opening title track is a wistful folk ballad sung by a melancholy young university graduate who is unable to find employment. At the end of the song, he whispers, "maaf ibu" (sorry mother). It is followed by the lively country-and-western style song, "Guru Oemar Bakri", about a teacher he admires. Another song is the blackly comic "Ambulance Zig Zag".

== Musical style ==
Iwan Fals' early influence from Bob Dylan is evident in the richly descriptive documentary lyrics, and also in the heavy use of harmonica. The album also features country-style banjo and violin.

The features high production standards, as Musica had identified Iwan Fals' talents from his existing recordings, and were willing to invest in the album. Guest stars on the album include Idris Sardi, who played violin on Guru Oemar Bakriem, while Jazz violinist Luluk Purwanto plays throughout the album, a role that she reprised on the album's follow-up, 'Opini'.

== Track listing ==
1. Sarjana Muda - ('Graduate'): The story of an unemployed university graduate
2. Guru Oemar Bakri - About Oemar Bakri, a (presumably fictional) old-fashioned teacher, who has spent forty years devoted to teaching:
3. Hatta - A memorial for the recently deceased Indonesian revolutionary hero and politician Mohammad Hatta
4. Doa Pengobral Dosa
5. Si Tua Sais Pedati (The Old Ox Cart) - A narrative about an old ox-drawn cart, that requires no fuel and creates no pollution.
6. Ambulance Zig Zag - A black comedy, previously released on the comic album Canda Dalam Nada. It tells the tale of a rich woman, brought into hospital by ambulance, and sped into the treatment room. It then contrasts this with the treatment of a poor patient
7. 22 Januari
8. Puing (Debris) - A song about the horrors of war.
9. Yang Terlupakan (aka "Denting Piano") - (The Forgotten)
10. Bangunlah Putra Putri Pertiwi (Awaken Sons & Daughters of the (mother)land) - A nationalistic song referencing three aspects of Indonesian national identity, Garuda, the winged bird, Pancasila, the national philosophy, and the Indonesian flag
