= Dira Sugandi =

Indonesian singer (born 1967)

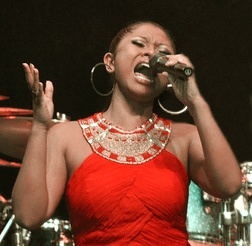
- Born: July 29, 1967 (age 59); Bandung
- Occupation: Singer

Dira Sugandi or DIRA (born 29 July 1967) is an Indonesian singer.

== Early life ==
She was born in Bandung, West Java on 29 July 1967 into a family with a strong singing tradition (both her mother and grandmother were singers). She began her singing career as a vocal performance major in the Music Department at Pelita Harapan, earning her bachelor's degree in 2006.

== Career ==
DIRA's debut album "Something About the Girl" was produced by Jean-Paul Maunick a.k.a. Bluey, leader of INCOGNITO a British Acid Jazz Band and was released in 2010 and distributed throughout UK, Japan, Europe, US and Indonesia. The album was nominated by UK Soultracks for Best Independent Album of The Year 2010 and Dira was also nominated for Best Female Vocalist 2010.

The album features 14 songs, primarily in English, with two cuts in Indonesian "Kucemburu" and "Kami Cinta Indonesia" (We love Indonesia) written by Harry Roesli.

In December 2010, she acted in the musical version of the film "Laskar Pelangi" which was shown at Taman Ismail Marzuki Fine Arts Center in Jakarta, sharing the role of the teacher, Muslimah, along with two other actresses, Lea Simanjuntak and Ekadeli.

On 15 May 2011, Dira Sugandi performed a duet with Italian tenor Andrea Bocelli during his first-ever concert in Indonesia, at the Ritz-Carlton Pacific Place in Jakarta.

Dira Sugandi performed at the Anugerah Musik Indonesia (AMI) Awards 2011, an Indonesian Music Award show on 6 July 2011 in Jakarta.

== Album ==
- Something About the Girl (2010)
- Something About the Girl – Deluxe Version (2021)

== Single ==
- Langit/Pelangi – Double Single (2017)
- Malaikat Kecilku – Single (2017)
- Seribu Tahun Lagi – Single (2021)
- Back in Time – Single (2021)

== Movie ==
- 9 Summers 10 Autumns (2013)
- In The Absence of the Sun (2014)
- A World Without – Netflix (2021)
