= Bondan Prakoso =

- Born: Bondan Prakoso; May 8, 1984 (age 42); Jakarta, Indonesia
- Genres: Rock, Nu metal, Hip-hop, Rap-Rock, Keroncong, Alternative Rock, Funk
- Occupations: Musician, singer–songwriter, bass guitarist, record producer
- Instruments: Vocals, bass guitar, guitar, Drum,
- Years active: 1988 - present
- Label: VOLD Record
- Website: www.bondanprakoso.com

Bondan Prakoso (born May 8, 1984) is an Indonesian singer-songwriter, bass guitarist, and record producer. He is known as the former bassist of rock band Funky Kopral (1999–2003) and the lead singer of the rap rock collaboration band, Bondan Prakoso & Fade 2 Black (2005–2013). He has won several awards from Indonesian Music Awards with both Funky Kopral and his collaboration band, Bondan Prakoso & Fade 2 Black.

== Biography ==
=== Early life ===
Bondan Prakoso was born on May 8, 1984. He is the second child of three children. Since 8 years old, Bondan had already been exposed to the music industry as a child singer. He emerged as a famous young popstar in early 1990s. Bondan released 8 albums in 1988–1995.

=== Funky Kopral ===
In the late 1990s, Bondan and his friends, Anggara Mulia (Angga), Bobbi Wibowo (Robbi), Kristo Perwira, and Arlonsy Miraldi (Onci), formed a rock band called Funky Kopral. Together, they released three albums in 1999–2003 with Universal Music record label. In 2002, Iman Taufik Rachman (Iman) come and replaced Onci as the guitarist. Eventually, the band broke up in late 2003. Years later, Funky Kopral has reformed, but with only a few remained from the original formation. The others had formed or joined other bands, such as: Iman with J-Rocks, and Bondan with his collaboration, Bondan Prakoso & Fade 2 Black.

== Bondan Prakoso & Fade 2 Black ==
In mid-2004, Bondan Prakoso formed a musical collaboration with the hip-hop group Fade 2 Black, consisting of Tito (Titz), Ari (Santoz), and Eza (Lezzano). The group became known for blending elements of rock, funk, and hip-hop in their music.

Bondan, formerly the bassist of the funk-rock band Funky Kopral, met Tito while both were studying Dutch literature at the University of Indonesia. Despite their differing musical backgrounds—Bondan in funk and rock, and Tito in rap and hip-hop—they shared musical ideas and a vision for genre fusion.

After leaving Funky Kopral in late 2003, Bondan began working on a new musical direction. In 2004, he invited Tito to collaborate on the project. Tito proposed involving the full lineup of Fade 2 Black, and the group began working together to develop a unique sound combining rap, rock, and funk.

Their debut studio album, Respect, was released in August 2005 by Sony BMG Music Indonesia. Bondan handled instrumentation, looping, and production, while Fade 2 Black focused on writing and performing lyrics. The album featured rap as the primary vocal style and introduced their genre-blending approach to the Indonesian music scene.

The group gained recognition with this release and received several awards, including:

- MTV Indonesia Exclusive Artist (2005)
- MTV Advance Warning Award (2005)
- Anugerah Musik Indonesia (AMI) Award for Best Rap Album Production (2006)

In 2008, they released their second studio album, Unity, which included the breakthrough single "Keroncong Protol". The album continued their experimental sound and earned them another AMI Award for Best Rap Album Production.

Their third album, For All, was released in 2010 and featured the hit single "Ya Sudahlah", which achieved commercial success through widespread ring back tone downloads and online popularity. Other singles from the album included "Kita Slamanya" and "Tetap Semangat".

The group received several additional awards for their work on this album:

- Anugerah Musik TerDahsyat – Most Popular Song ("Ya Sudahlah") (2011)
- Indosat Awards – Most Popular Artist/Group (R&B/Rap/Dance) (2011)
- Indosat Awards – Most Popular R&B/Rap/Dance Song ("Kita Slamanya") (2011)

As of 2011, they had begun working on their fourth studio album.

== Discography ==
=== Studio albums ===
Funky Kopral

- 1999: Funchopat
- 2000: Funkadelic Rhythm and Distortion
- 2003: Misteri Cinta

Bondan Prakoso & Fade 2 Black

- 2005: Respect
- 2007: Unity
- 2010: For All
- 2012: Respect & Unity For All
- 2014: Generasiku EP
