= Killing Me Inside =

Indonesian post hardcore band

- Also known as: Kilms
- Origin: Indonesia
- Genres: Emo; post hardcore; electronicore; heavy metal; metalcore; alternative rock; pop rock; screamo; modern rock
- Years active: 2005–present
- Labels: Fast Youth Records; Crooz Records; Royal Prima Musikindo
- Members: Josaphat Klemens
- Past members: Muhammad Fauzan Santoso; Onadio Leonardo; Raka Cyril Damar; Rendy Pradipta; Davi Frisya; Putra Pra Ramadhan; Savira Salsabila Razak; Faizal Halim Permana; Erlangga Wibisana; Rudye Nugraha Putra; Gama Gifari; Machdis Arie

Killing Me Inside is an Indonesian post hardcore band from South Jakarta. The band's current line up consists of Josaphat Klements, Gama Gifari, and Machdis Arie. The band has changed formation over the years many times due to members frequently leaving.

== Career ==
Killing Me Inside was formed in June 2005 by Josaphat Klements (guitar), Onadio Leonardo (bass), Rendy (drums) and Raka Cyril Damar (guitar). After a search for a vocalist, the band found Fauzan "Sansan", who joined in December 2005. While performing at local cafes & events, they released a three-song demo. The songs included were "A Letter Of Memories", "Suicide Phenomena", & "The Tormented". These were later re-recorded for their debut album.

=== 2010-2012: Self titled album & 1 Reason ===
Killing Me Inside signed to Crooz Records & released their 2nd album Killing Me Inside.

Killing Me Inside's third studio album, 1 Reason, was released in September 2012, & produced the singles "Menyesal", "Never Go Back" and "For 1 Last Time". Prior to the release of 1 Reason, the band had also issued the single "Melangkah".

=== 2014-present: Rebirth: A New Beginning, new concept & departure of Onad ===
In 2014, vocalist Onadio decided to leave the band due to differences in direction & frequent issues with his throat. He also later admitted that he was already bored with this genre of music. In an interview, Onadio revealed that he had had conflicting issues with Josaphat.

Killing Me Inside created a new concept album comprising genres such as metalcore and electronic dance music (EDM). 2007 Mamamia finalist Savira Razak replaced Onadio as vocalist. The band released their fourth studio album, Rebirth: A New Beginning. At the 18th Annual Anugerah Musik Indonesia, Killing Me Inside was nominated for Best Rock Album.

In 2016, drummer Putra Pra Ramadhan announced on his Instagram account that he was leaving the band to focus on teaching drumming.

== Members ==
Current

- Josaphat Klements – guitar and backing vocals (2005–present)
- Chandra Erin – guitar, backing vocals, screaming vocals (2025–present)
- Melody Alcassia – lead vocals (2025–present)

Former

- Muhammad Fauzan Santoso - lead vocals (2005-2009)
- Raka Cyril Damar – rhythm guitar (2005–2008)
- Rendy Pradipta - drums, percussion instrument (2005-2009)
- Onadio Leonardo – bass and backing vocals (2005–2009), lead vocals, screaming vocals (2009–2014)
- Anak Agung Gde — bass and backing vocals, screaming vocals (2009)
- Davi Frisya – drums, percussion instrument (2009–2011)
- Savira Razak – lead vocals (2014–2018)
- Putra Pra Ramadhan – drums, percussion instrument (2011–2016)
- Erlangga Wibisana – bass, backing vocals, screaming vocals (2010–2018)
- Rudye Nugraha Putra – keyboardist, programming, loop, backing vocals, screaming vocals (2009–2019)
- Faizal Halim Permana – lead vocals, screaming vocals (2019-2023)
- Gama Gifari – drums, percussion instrument (2016–2025)
- Machdis Arie – bass, backing vocals (2017–2025)

== Discography ==
=== Studio albums ===
- A Fresh Start for Something New (2009)
- Killing Me Inside (2010)
- One Reason (2014)
- Rebirth: A New Beginning (2015)
