= Evie Tamala =

Indonesian singer and actress

- Born: Cucu Suryaningsih; 23 June 1969 (age 57); Tasikmalaya, West Java, Indonesia
- Occupations: Actress; singer
- Years active: 1987–present
- Musical career
- Genres: Dangdut
- Instruments: Vocals
- Labels: GP Records; Nagaswara; Musica Studios; Universal Indonesia

Cucu Suryaningsih or known her under stage name Evie Tamala (born 23 June 1969) is a popular Indonesian dangdut singer-songwriter. Evie became popular mainly because of her singles Selamat Malam, Cinta Ketok Magic, and Dokter Cinta.

== Discography ==
=== Studio albums ===
- Tang Ting Tong Der (1988)
- Dokter Cinta (1989)
- Hari-Hari Cinta (1990)
- Aduh Sayang (1991)
- Rambut (1992)
- Kangmas (1994)
- Rembulan Malam (1994)
- Selamat Malam (1995)
- Duka & Lukaku (1996)
- Suara Hati (1997)
- Best Of The Best Evie Tamala 1999 (1999)
- Kasmaran (1999)
- Album Cinta (2000)
- Best of the Best Evie Tamala - AMI Sharp Award (2000)
- Kerinduan (2001)
- Asmara (2002)
- Selamat Datang Cinta (2005)
- Getar Suara Hati (2006)
- Indahnya (2006)

Sundanese Pop studio albums

- Cinta Ketok Magic (1991)
- Cinta Parabola (1992)
- Tunggara (2001)
- Angin Peuting (2010)

Javanese Pop studio albums

- Kangen (1993)
- Yogya Priyangan (1994)
