= Zore =

Zore is a surname. Notable people with the surname include:

- Edward J. Zore (born 1945), American banker
- Gregor Zore (born 1978), Slovenian footballer
- Luko Zore (1846–1906), Serbian writer
- Mohiuddin Qadri Zore (1905–1962), Indian writer, scholar, poet, literary critic, and historian
