= Jackson Records =

Indian record label

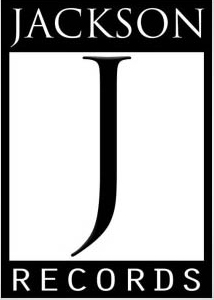
- Parent company: Jackson Records Digital Entertainment LLP
- Founded: 2011
- Founder: Utsav Bhanja
- Country of origin: India
- Official website: https://www.jacksonrecords.co.in

Jackson Records is a film and music publishing label based in India. The label and its sub-labels / imprints are owned and administered by Jackson Records Digital Entertainment LLP (formerly known as Digisys Media Network until July 2014). Jackson Records as a label started functioning from December, 2011.

== Background ==
While delivering media services to other business concerns and artists since 2007, Jackson Records was named as a label in 2011.

Jackson Records was previously known only as a record label under parent Digisys Media Network until July 2014, when it was deemed to be a digital services network under the newly autonomous label - Jackson Records. It was then, when the company got the new name Jackson Records Media & Strategics, now incorporated as Jackson Records Digital Entertainment LLP.

== Genres and sector ==
Jackson Records started with indie rock and metal bands from around the globe in compilation albums, followed by regional and National linguistic projects in Bengali and Hindi respectively. Jackson Records also controls and owns rights of third party music catalogs/ repertoire from Upasana Entertainment Pvt. Ltd.

== Parent company ==
Jackson Records Digital Entertainment was founded in 2007 by Utsav Bhanja, an Indian entrepreneur and artist. The firm provided digital media marketing solutions to individuals and organizations. At present Jackson Records Digital Entertainment LLP's clientele domain includes music and film producers, directors, artists, and other media concerns. The company also owns, sub-licenses and operates a group of media and entertainment websites, grouped under Jackson Records Content Network.

== Major releases ==
Web / TV Series
Year	Title	Artists	Notes
2015	Uttaran (Episodes 1 - 3)	Artists of Jackson Records Eastern Artists Alliance	
2016	Uttaran (Episodes 4 - 9)	Artists of Jackson Records Eastern Artists Alliance	
2017	Uttaran (Episodes 10 - 20)	Artists of Jackson Records Eastern Artists Alliance	Ongoing
2016	Jackson Records Live Studio (Episodes 1 - 4)	Various Artists	

Films
Year	Title	Producer	Production	Type	Notes
2017	Poushey Pa	Utsav Bhanja	Jackson Records Films	Documentary	Post Production

CD / DVD / Digital Music Releases
Year	Title	Artists	Notes
2012	Different Spectra - Re-Edition	Utsav Bhanja	
2012	Incarnation	Better Off Dead, Switch to Silence, Crematory Art, Unholy Fire, Twist In Tale	
2012	Rutho Na	Soujanya Raj Roy	
2012	Shiddat	Utsav Bhanja, Jay-C	
2012	Tumi Notun Sathi	Babul Supriyo, Sriradha Bandopadhyay, Pratik Chowdhury, Nandita Ghosh, Parimal Bhattacharya	
2012	Galactic Love	New Nobility - Australia	Single
2013	Incarnation II	Tallene, Mind ErasHer, LT, Ashwamedha, New Nobility, Oz Icely, Kaucasian, Sanged	
2013	Shesh Ontora	Jagannath Basu, Debshankar Haldar, Soumitro Basu, Ranjana Bhanja	Radio Drama
2013	Chorkata	Jagannath Basu, Debshankar Haldar, Soumitro Basu, Satinath Mukhopadhyay, Ranjana Bhanja	Radio Drama
2013	Samparko	Various Artists	Radio Drama - Live
2014	Yeh Kaisi Zindagi	Aryan Agarwal	Single / Video
2014	Khuji Tomaye	Shounak Bhowmik	Single
2014	Bairi Piya	Archish Rai Kapil, Irfan Hussain	Single / Video
2014	Souls Behind	Satinath Mukhopadhyay, Sharmila Bandopadhyay, Bimal Konar, Amita Ghosh Roy, Prosenjit Ghosh, Nivedita Nag Tahabilder	
2014	Transformer Comes to Play	Jonathan Chang, Utsav Bhanja, Ishaan Kewalramani, Domesh Netam	Stop Motion
2014	Dhwani	Amit Kumar, Anshoo Walia, Richa Kumar & others	
2015	Cocktail	Sushi Rain	
2015	Katha Diyechhiley	Late Dhiren Basu	
2015	Tomari Katha Bhebe	Raghav Chattopadhyay, Saikat Mitra, Shivaji Chattopadhyay, Indranil Sen	
2015	Fakebook	Timir Biswas, Joel, June Banerjee, Ujjaini Mukherjee, Dolaan, Zubeen Garg, Daya Nidhi, Kinjal. Featured Actors: Gaurav Chakrabarty, Ridhima Ghosh, Indrasish Roy	Bengali Movie
2015	Tobuo Basanta	Ajoy Chakrabarty, Zubeen Garg, Anweshaa Dutta, Shatrujit, Shyamantak & Swapan Mukherjee. Featured Actors: Rahul Banerjee, Ritabhari Chakraborty, Mishti Chakraborty, Rajatava Dutta, Rudranil Ghosh, Dwijen Banerjee	Bengali Movie
2015	Pagol Mon	Avishek Bhattacharya.	
2015	Onyo Opalaa	Raghav Chatterjee, Monomoy Bhattacharya, Jayati Chakraborty, Upali Chatterjee, Seema Acharya Choudhury. Featured Actors: Roopa Ganguly, Ritabhari Chakraborty, Bhaswar Chattopadhyay, Nijel Akkara.	Bengali Movie
2016	Chiropothik Rabindranath	Satinath Mukhopadhyay, Sharmila Bandyopadhyay	
2016	Kobigurur Avishek	Avishek Bhattacharya	
2016	Game Plan	Featured Actors: Mahesh Thakur, Pallavi Chatterjee.	Bengali Movie
2016	Ek Juger Srot	Tandra Chakraborty.	Poetry
2017	Durga Darshan	Nakash Aziz, Ujjaini Mukherjee, EPR	Bengali Single
2017	Mahishasura Mardini	Ranjana Bhanja, Radharaman Sur, Sushmita Bhattacharya, Snehendoo Dewanji	Sanskrit/Bengali Recital
2017	White Canvas	Dibyendu Mukherjee	Bengali Single
