= Iwan Fals =

Indonesian singer

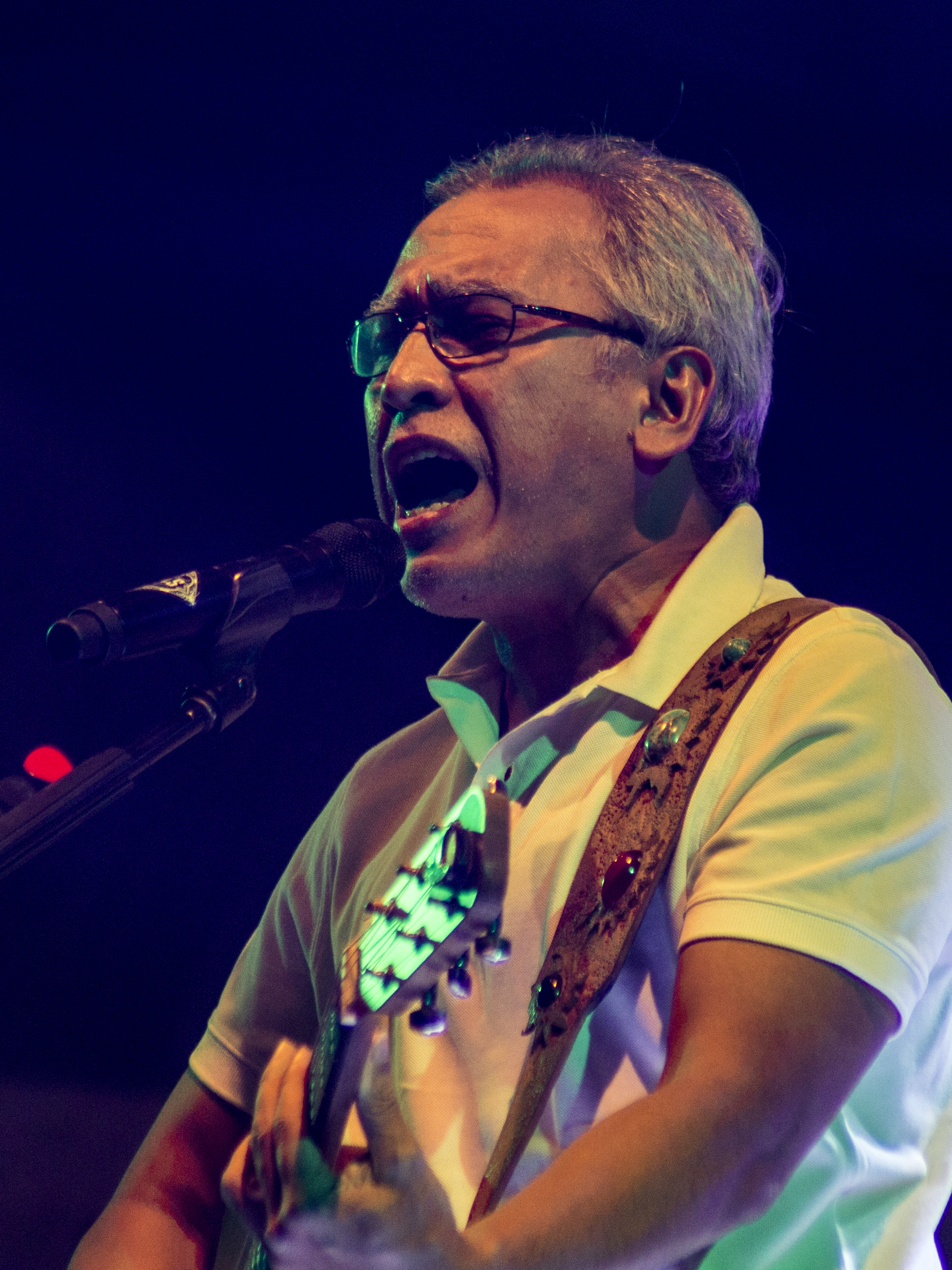
- Iwan Fals during performance in 2015
- Born: Virgiawan Listanto; September 3, 1961 (age 64); Jakarta, Indonesia
- Occupations: Singer; Songwriter; Musician
- Musical career
- Genres: Pop; Ballad; Folk; Country; Rock
- Occupations: Singer; Songwriter; Guitarist
- Years active: 1975–present
- Label: Musica Studios
- Website: https://www.iwanfals.co.id/

Virgiawan Listanto or better known as Iwan Fals (born 3 September 1961) is an Indonesian singer, songwriter and guitarist of Javanese descent. In 2002, Time named him a Great Asian Hero.

== Early life ==
Iwan Fals was born Virgiawan Listanto in Jakarta, on 3 September 1961, to Harsoyo, a soldier, and Lies Suudijah. He studied at SMP Negeri 5 Bandung and SMAK BPK Bandung. He continued his studies at Sekolah Tinggi Publisistik and then Institut Kesenian Jakarta. At the age of thirteen, he appeared as a street musician at small wedding ceremonies and other social events.

== Career ==
While he was 18, Iwan Fals, Toto Gunarto, Helmi, Bambang Bule and Kakek Jagonk formed a group named Amburadul. The group released the album "Perjalanan" in 1979, which was not successful, but was re-released with the added track '3 Bulan' as '3 Bulan' (1980) in 1980. The group disbanded and played no further role in Iwan Fals' career.

As part of his early career, Iwan Fals also recorded some comedy albums, after winning a comedy country singing contest. He sang of comic situations and themes, and his first release was on Canda Dalam Nada (the A-side featured five songs by Iwan Fals: Generasi Frustrasi, Dongeng Tidur, Imitasi, Kisah Sepeda Motorku (aka. Kopral), and Joni Kesiangan while the B-side consisted of songs by Tom Slepe and Pusaka Jaya). The songs Dongeng Tidur, Joni Kesiangan and Kisah Sepeda Motorku were released, with one new song, Ambulance Zig Zag, on the Iwan Fals mini-album Canda Dalam Nada, while Generasi Frustrasi and Imitasi were also included on the Yang Muda Yang Bercanda II multi artist comedy compilation.

During this time, Iwan Fals supported himself by busking.

1981 saw Iwan Fals' breakthrough, when he signed to Musica Studio to record his first solo album, Sarjana Muda. This album shows Iwan Fals' signature country music style, with the protest song Guru Oemar Bakrie, which talks of how a teacher is poorly paid but still responsible for educating future well-paid and successful people. Guru Oemar Bakrie became very well known and popular in Indonesia, and helped established Iwan Fals's name. The album also contains several ballads. It benefited from considerable investment by Musica Studio, who used high-quality musicians and producer for the album.

1982's Opini, also on Musica Studio, cemented Iwan Fals's reputation as a protest singer, but also as a balladeer. 'Galang Rambu Anarki', for his newborn son, combined both elements, commenting on both the happy event of the birth of his first child, but also commenting on rising prices, saying that perhaps his child would be malnourished if they could not afford to buy milk.

1983 saw the release of Sumbang, while 1984's album releases were Barang Antik and Sugali.

In April 1984, Iwan Fals was arrested and questioned for two weeks after performing the songs Demokrasi Nasi and Mbak Tini, both songs never recorded on an album, in Pekanbaru. The song Mbak Tini (Tien) was about a prostitute with a road-side coffee shop, married to 'Soeharyo' (Suharto). The events were retold in the song '14-4-84' on 1986's Ethiopia.

Iwan Fals continued to release albums throughout the 1980s, while in 1989 he formed the group Swami, which released two albums Swami I in 1989, and Swami II in 1991. A similar grouping was Kantata Takwa, which contained several Swami personnel. The musical style was "rebana rock", a blend of Jimi Hendrix and Rick Wakeman, to a Betawi rebana. The album Kantata Takwa was released in 1990, featuring songs such as "Bento" and "Bongkar" ("Rip It Down"), two of several songs which they sang during a demonstration by college students. The Bento song is influenced by The Beatles song "Day Tripper".

Up to the release of Orang Gila in 1994, Iwan Fals had released approximately two new albums per year for 15 years. Since 1994, he has greatly reduced his release schedule, putting out only two singles in 1995, and one in 1996, while in 1998 Kantata Samsara, the second and final album by Kantata Takwa, was released.

To make up for the lack of new content, a number of Iwan Fals compilations were released in the 1990s and 2000s, including Best of the Best, Akustik (3 volumes), and Salam Reformasi ("Greetings Reformation"), which sold more than 50,000 copies.

In 2002, Iwan Fals released his first new solo album since 1994, Suara Hati. In 2003 the album 'In Collaboration With' was released consisting of performances with other Indonesia artists. Manusia Setengah Dewa, in 2004, was a solo album.

In 2005, he released Iwan Fals in Love, essentially a compilation of existing Iwan Fals romantic recordings, but with the new song "Ijinkan Aku Menyayangimu" ("Let Me Love You") as the main single, and five re-recordings of old songs. Two songs, in collaboration with Indra Lesmana, Haruskah Pergi, and Selancar, were released as digital downloads in 2006.

In 2007, 50:50 was released by Musica Studios. The album's themes were romance and social criticism. One single from the album, "Pulanglah" ("Go Home"), tells about the death of Munir. Six singles were written by himself and other six singles were written by his fellow musicians. Two songs were released in 2009 as Untukmu Terkasih.

In 2010, he released Keseimbangan, and in 2011 he released a new album titled "Tergila-gila" with 4 new songs inside.

=== OI ===
He has a large fan club which is called OI (stylised as lowercase oi), he stated "Oi is not actually Orang Indonesia, so there are many friends (fans) whose faces I recognise, but I can't remember their names." He started calling his fans who often come to his house to listen his free acoustic live performance with "Oi" which literally means "Hey". Thus, the fans derived OI as the name of the fan club and made it as an abbreviation from Orang Indonesia (Indonesian People) as the acronym must contain a meaning. The idea for naming Orang Indonesia came from Iwan Fals' foundation, Yayasan Orang Indonesia ("Indonesian People Foundation"). OI is now led by his wife and running under the management of PT. Tiga Rambu (limited liability company).

== Lyrical themes ==
Iwan Fals has been compared with Bob Dylan, who was one of his key influences, both on his early style, which made heavy use of the harmonica, and on his lyrics, which have frequently been in the protest song genre.

For instance, "Kamu Sudah Gila" ("You've Gone Crazy") and "Apa Kamu Sudah Jadi Tuhan?" ("Have You Become God?") criticised the New Order regime.

Other songs are more observational, but still could be seen as political. For instance, his song Galang Rambu Anarki, written for his newborn son, talks of being too poor to raise his son, while "Kembang Pete" ("Stinkbean Flower") tells the story of the underestimated poor. "Aku Bosan" ("I'm Bored") is about a child protesting to his parents because they left him alone at home. While "Hura-Hura Huru-Hara" ("Fake Riot") compares moneylender to blood-sucking vampires.

The 1988 song (and album) '1910', which could be interpreted as referring to the year 1910, was actually a reference to the date October 19, the date, in 1987, of the Bintaro train crash, a disaster the song documents in observational style. "Celoteh Camar Tolol dan Cemar", on 1983's Sumbang, documented the sinking of the Tampomas II ship in Masalembu.

Aside from his observational protest songs, Iwan Fals is known for his love songs, which include "Yang Terlupakan" ("The Forgotten"), "Mata Indah Bola Pingpong" ("Beautiful Pingpong Ball Eyes"), "Antara Kau, Aku, dan Bekas Pacarmu" ("Among You, Me, and Your ex-lover"), and "Pesawat Tempurku" ("My Jet Fighter").

Although a songwriter, Iwan Fals' status as one of Indonesia's leading rock/pop performers has led to his recording material from numerous other songwriters. Some of his most notable hits written by others include Barang Antik ("Antique"), "Kemesraan" ("Intimacy"), "Kumenanti Seorang Kekasih" ("I'm Waiting for a Lover"), "Aku Bukan Pilihan" ("I'm Not an Option") and "Ijinkan Aku Menyayangimu" ("Let Me Love You").

== Personal life ==
On 1 January 1982, Iwan Fals' first son, Galang Rambu Anarki was born. One of Fals' best-known songs, Galang Rambu Anarki, was written about his son's birth and released on 1982's Opini (Opinion) album. Galang followed his father's footsteps playing in a band from a young age as a guitarist and folk musician, but he died at 15, on 25 April 1997, of either a morphine overdose or asthma. 'Galang Rambu Anarki' translates to "support the sign of anarchy" in English.

In 1985, Iwan Fals' first daughter Annisa Cikal Rambu Basae was born. His third child is Rayya Rambu Robbani. He and Rosanna, his wife live in Cibubur, West Java.

== Discography ==
- Perjalanan (as part of Amburadul group) (1979)
- Canda Dalam Nada (1979) – comedy album, Iwan has the A-side only
- Canda Dalam Ronda (1980) – comedy mini-album of four tracks, contains one new track 'Ambulance Zig Zag'
- 3 Bulan (consists of Perjalanan plus the new track 3 Bulan) (1980)
- Sarjana Muda (1981) – Musica debut
- Opini (1982)
- Sumbang (1983)
- Barang Antik (1984)
- Sugali (1984)
- Kelompok Penyanyi Jalanan (KPJ) – as part of KPJ, or Street Singers Group, Iwan Fals sings on 3 songs (1985)
- Sore Tugu Pancoran (1985)
- Aku Sayang Kamu (1986)
- Ethiopia (1986)
- Lancar (1987)
- Surat Buat Wakil Rakyat (1987)
- 1910 (1988)
- "Kemesraan" (1988) – single, with Betharia Sonata, Chrisye, Rafika Duri, Itang, Jamal Mirdad, Etrie, Nani
- Mata Dewa (1989)
- Swami I (as part of the group Swami) (1989)
- Kantata Takwa (as part of the group Kantata) (1990)
- Cikal (1991)
- Swami II (as part of the group Swami) (1991)
- Belum Ada Judul (1992)
- Hijau (1992)
- Dalbo (1993)
- Anak Wayang (1994)
- Orang Gila (1994)
- Kantata Samsara (as part of the group Kantata) (1998)
- Suara Hati (2002)
- In Collaboration with (2003)
- Manusia Setengah Dewa (2004)
- In Love (2005) (contains only one new song, and four re-recordings)
- 50:50 (2007)
- Untukmu Terkasih (2009) – Mini-album – two songs only
- Keseimbangan (2010)
- Tergila-gila (2011)
- Raya (2013)
- Pun Aku (2021)

== Awards ==
In 2002, he was named as Great Asian Hero by Time magazine. In 2011, he received "Satyalancana", the highest government award from Jero Wacik, Culture and Tourism Minister of Indonesia.

Rolling Stone Indonesia listed Swami's song Bongkar as the best Indonesian song of all time and Bento on the fifth position, Kantata Takwa's Kesaksian on 81st position, and Iwan Fals' solo Guru Oemar Bakrie, Yang Terlupakan, Surat Buat Wakil Rakyat, Pesawat Tempur, Galang Rambu Anarki, and Sarjana Muda on 5th, 42nd, 51st, 56th, 65th, and 97th, respectively, making him the second musician with the most representative on the chart after Koes Plus with the margin of one.

Iwan Fals was announced as the winner of the 2021 Telkomsel Awards in the category "Lifetime Achievement Awards" in June 2021.

== See also ==
- Rhoma Irama
- Chrisye

== Bibliography ==
- Aning S., Floriberta (2006). 100 Tokoh Yang Mengubah Indonesia (Revised ed.). Yogyakarta: Narasi. ISBN 9789797564759.
- Emmerson, Donald K. (1999). Indonesia Beyond Suharto: Polity, Economy, Society, Transition. Armonk, N.Y.: M. E. Sharpe. ISBN 9781563248900.
- Ginting, Asrat; et al. (2009). Musisiku. Jakarta: Republika. ISBN 9789791102520.
- Sen, Krishna; Hill, David T. (2000). Media, Culture and Politics in Indonesia. South Melbourne, Vict.: Oxford University Press. ISBN 9780195537031.
- Ubaedy, A. N.; Ratrioso, Imam (2005). Refleksi Kehidupan: Kisah dan Kajian Hidup Orang-Orang Ternama. Jakarta: Elex Media Komputindo. ISBN 9789792077254.
