= Indra Lesmana =

Indonesian arranger, composer, and musician

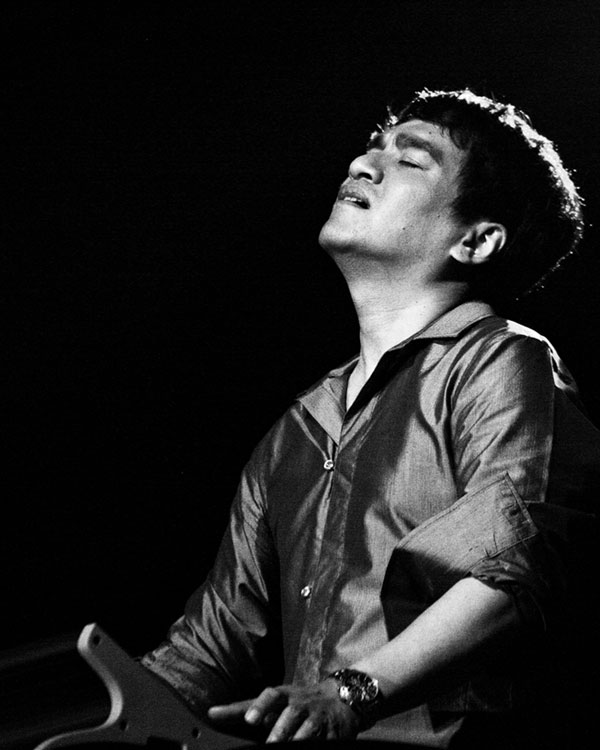

Background information
- Born: 28 March 1966 (age 59); Jakarta, Indonesia
- Genres: Jazz
- Occupations: Arranger musician songwriter record producer
- Instrument: Keyboards
- Years active: 1976–present
- Labels: Jackson; Union Artis; BMG Musik Indonesia; Sony BMG
- Website: indralesmana.com

Indra Lesmana (born 28 March 1966) is an Indonesian arranger, composer, songwriter, and jazz musician. He is the father of an Indonesian actress and singer-songwriter, Eva Celia Lesmana.

== Biography ==
Lesmana grew up in a house of music and musicians. His father was jazz guitarist Jack Lesmana and his mother Nien Lesmana was a singer. He began playing piano when he was nine. A year later, he played in his father's band. He attended the New South Wales Conservatorium of Music in Australia.

In 1981, he and his father formed the Jack and Indra Lesmana Quartet with Karim Suweileh and James Morrison. The album Children of Fantasy was recorded in Indonesia and released by Queen Records. When he returned to Australia, he formed the Latin jazz fusion band Children of Fantasy with Jack Lesmana, Steve Brien, Dale Barlow, Tony Thijssen, and Harry Rivers. In 1982 he started Nebula with Andy Evans, Vince Genova, Carlinhos Goncalves, Steve Hunter, and Ken James. The album No Standing, with four compositions by Lesmana, was released in Australia by Jasmine and in Indonesia by Jackson. In 1983, he joined Tony Buck, Sandy Evans, and Steve Elphick to form the modern jazz band Women and Children First and recorded their first album in 1983.

Zebra, an affiliate of MCA signed him to a contract and released No Standing as his solo album. The album was remastered by Bernie Grundman before being released in the U.S.

Lesmana moved to California in 1985 and recorded For Earth and Heaven (1986) with Vinnie Colaiuta, Charlie Haden, Jimmy Haslip, Tootie Heath, Michael Landau, Airto Moreira, and Bobby Shew. His singles "No Standing" (No Standing) and "Stephanie" (For Earth and Heaven) entered the Billboard magazine jazz chart. He formed a 17-piece big band in March 2002. He wrote his first big band arrangement for the soundtrack to the film Rumah Ke Tujuh produced by his sister, Mira Lesmana.

== Audio engineering ==
Lesmana has deep interest in audio technology. His album Tragedi (1984) was first as a sound designer. In 1998 he produced Sabda Prana album by Java Jazz. In 1999 he decided to establish a mixing and mastering house specializing in jazz. He has mixed and mastered more than 20 albums by Indonesian acts such as Andien, Dewa Budjana, Chlorophyl, Delon, Simak Dialog, The Groove, Humania, Ermy Kullit, Maliq & D'Essentials, Rieka Roeslan, Donny Suhendra. He was nominated for Best Mixing Engineer for the album Rumah Ke Tujuh at AMI Awards 2003.

== Other work ==
In early 2004, with his wife Hanny Trihandojo Lesmana and Aksan Syuman, organized a weekly program in South Jakarta to encourage young people to explore music and dance. In March 2004, Lesmana was hired by Fremantle Media and RCTI to be a judge on Indonesian Idol. He was a judge in the first Asian Idol held in Indonesia.

== Discography ==
- 1978 Ayahku Sahabatku
- 1981 Children of Fantasy
- 1982 No Standing
- 1982 Nostalgia
- 1982 Latin Jazz Fusion (Special Edition)
- 1983 Women and Children First
- 1984 Tragedi
- 1984 Yang Pertama Yang Bahagia
- 1986 For Earth and Heaven
- 1986 Karina
- 1986 Gemilang
- 1986 Jack & Indra Lesmana Various
- 1987 La Samba Primadona
- 1987 Semakin Menawan
- 1988 Ekspresi
- 1989 Titi DJ 1989
- 1989 Kau Datang
- 1990 Aku Ingin
- 1990 Dunia Boleh Tertawa
- 1991 Adegan
- 1991 Cerita Lalu
- 1992 Selangkah Di Depan
- 1992 Hanya Untukmu
- 1993 Biarkan Aku Kembali
- 1994 Tiada Kata
- 1994 Waktu Berjalan
- 1994 Kehadiran
- 1994 Bulan Di Atas Asia
- 1994 Ayah
- 1995 Kabut Di Kaki Langit
- 1995 Jalan Yang Hilang
- 1996 Romantic Piano
- 1996 Jalan Hidupmu
- 1996 Menari-Nari
- 1997 Lost Forest
- 1997 Selamat Tinggal
- 1998 Kedua
- 1998 Sabda Prana
- 1999 Saat Yang Terindah
- 2000 Interaksi
- 2000 Reborn
- 2001 The Birds
- 2002 Kinanti
- 2002 Rumah Ke Tujuh
- 2003 Gelatik
- 2005 Silver
- 2006 Jalinan Kasih
- 2007 Kayon – Tree of life
- 2008 Kembali Satu
- 2009 Dream Hope and Faith
- 2010 Joy Joy Joy
- 2011 Love Life Wisdom – featuring LLW (Indra Lesmana, Barry Likumahuwa & Sandy Winarta)
- 2012 Indra Lesmana 11:11 ( iOS app album )
- 2013 Loose Loud Whiz – featuring LLW (Lesmana Likumahuwa Works)
- 2013 Adriana OST
- 2014 Stars
- 2014 Ring P.I.G Tone ( P.I.G)
- 2015 Mutual Affection
- 2015 Change
- 2015 Frangipani
- 2015 Eclipse
- 2016 About Jack
- 2017 Chapter One (Krakatau Reunion)
- 2017 "Distance" (single)
- 2018 Surya Sewana
- 2018 Sacred Geometry

== Awards ==
- Best Jazz/Pop Keyboards Instrumentalist – Gadis [1989]
- Best Pop Selling Album: Aku Ingin – BASF Awards [1990]
- Diamond Achievement Awards – De Beers Diamond [1995]
- Best Jazz/Fusion Album – producer: Ermi Kullit – Saat Yang Terindah – 4th AMI Awards [2000]
- Best Jazz Vocalist – News Music Awards [2001]
- Best Keyboardist – News Music Awards [2001]
- Best Instrumental Song: "Reborn" – 5th AMI Awards [2001]
- Best Jazz/Contemporary Jazz Album – producer: Andien – Kinanti – 6th AMI Awards [2002]
- Best Score/Soundtrack: Rumah Ke Tujuh – Festival Film Bandung [2003]
- Best Jazz/Contemporary Jazz Artist – 7th AMI Awards [2003]
- Best Jazz Song: "Mimpi & Rumah ke Tujuh" – 7th AMI Awards [2003]
- Best Jazz Arranger: "Mimpi & Rumah ke Tujuh" – 7th AMI Awards [2003]
- Best Jazz Producer: "OST Rumah ke Tujuh" – 7th AMI Awards [2003]
- Most Radical Musician: Nokia 7600 [2004]
- Rolling Stone magazine Indonesia – 41st Best Indonesian Album of All Time: Reborn [2007]
- Most Favorite Jazz Player: JAK JAZZ [2008]
- Rolling Stone magazine Indonesia – 68th Best Indonesian Song (1950–2008): "Aku Ingin" [2009]
- Most Prominent Jazz Musician: 33rd Jazz Goes to Campus – 4th JGTC Award [2010]
- Australian Alumni Award for Cultural & Art [2010]
- Best Jazz Artist Instrumental Performance: 14th AMI Awards [2011]
- Most Influential Indonesian Musician on Twitter: [2011]
- Brand Personality Award – Contribution to the World of Jazz Music: Asia Pacific Brand Foundation at Kuala Lumpur International Jazz Festival [2012]
