= List of awards and nominations received by Noah =

Noah awards and nominations
Awards and nominations
Award	Wins	Nominations
Anugerah Musik Indonesia	22	50
Anugerah Planet Muzik	5	25
Asia Song Festival	1	1
Dahsyatnya Awards	6	23
Infotainment Awards	3	11
MTV Asia Awards	3	3
MTV Indonesia Awards	3	5
Nickelodeon Indonesia Kids' Choice Awards	2	5
SCTV Music Awards	10	26
Yahoo! OMG Awards	2	6

Totals (Note: Certain award groups do not simply award one winner. They acknowledge several different recipients, have runners-up, and have third place. Since this is a specific recognition and is different from losing an award, runner-up mentions are considered wins in this award tally. For simplification and to avoid errors, each award in this list has been presumed to have had a prior nomination.)
- Wins: 87
- Nominations: 214

Noah are an Indonesian alternative pop/rock band. Noah were founded under the name Peterpan in Bandung, West Java on 1 December 2000 by Ariel (vocals), Andika (keyboard), Indra (bass), Lukman (guitar), Reza (drum) and Uki (guitar). After Andika and Indra split from the band in 2006, David (keyboard) became a band member in 2008. The band proceeded to abandon the Peterpan name and performed as "Ariel, Uki, Lukman, Reza, David" in 2009, before announcing their new name, Noah, in 2012. With nine million albums sold in Indonesia as of 2015, Noah are regarded as the best-selling alternative pop/rock band in the country.

In 2003, Peterpan released their first studio album, Taman Langit, which won SCTV Music Awards for best newcomer's album. Their second album, Bintang di Surga, was released in 2004 and is one of best-selling albums in Indonesia. The album won Best of the Best Album award and the title track won Best of the Best Production Work in 2005 Anugerah Musik Indonesia. In international awards, Peterpan won MTV Asia Awards for Favorite Artist Indonesia in 2005 and 2006. After changing their name to Noah, the band remained successful, with their first album under the new name, Seperti Seharusnya (2012), selling over one million copies dan won Best of the Best Album in 2013 Anugerah Musik Indonesia, while the album's lead single, "Separuh Aku", won Best of the Best Production Work in the same ceremony. In 2013, 2014 and 2015, Noah was nominated for Best Southeast Asian Act category in MTV Europe Music Awards. In 2020, Noah won another Anugerah Musik Indonesia award for Best of the Best Album for Keterkaitan Keterikatan (2019).

== 100% Ampuh Awards ==
Year	Nominee / work	Award	Result
2013	Noah	Best Band	Won
2013	"Separuh Aku"	Best Song	Won

== Anugerah Era ==
The Anugerah Era (English translation: Era Awards) was an award presented from 2001 to 2007. The award was for Radio Era listeners to choose their favorite artist. Noah received two awards from four nominations.

Year	Nominee / work	Award	Result
2005	Peterpan	Best Band	Nominated
2005	"Mungkin Nanti"	Best Rock Song	Won
2005	"Mungkin Nanti"	ERA Chart Awards	Won
2006	Peterpan	Best Band	Nominated

== Anugerah Industri Muzik ==
The Anugerah Industri Muzik (English translation: Music Industry Awards), commonly known by the acronym AIM, is the award ceremony to honour the Malaysian music industry, first held in 1993. It is Malaysia's equivalent of the Grammy Awards.

Year	Nominee / work	Award	Result
2005	Alexandria	Best Indonesia Album	Nominated

== Anugerah Musik Indonesia ==
The Anugerah Musik Indonesia (English translation: Indonesian Music Awards), is an annual Indonesian major music award. They have been compared to the American Grammy Awards and British Brit Awards. The award was formalized in 1997 by ASIRI (Association of Indonesia Recording Industry), PAPPRI (Association of Indonesian Singers, Songwriters and Music Record Producers), and KCI (Copyright Office of Indonesia). It is the highest music award given to outstanding artists in Indonesia. Noah received fourteen awards from 32 nominations.

Year	Nominee / work	Award	Result	Ref.
2005	"Ada Apa Denganmu"	Best Pop Duo/Collaboration/Group	Won	
2005	"Ada Apa Denganmu"	Best Pop Song	Won	
2005	"Ku Katakan Dengan Indah"	Best Alternative Pop Duo/Collaboration/Group	Won	
2005	Bintang di Surga	Best Alternative Pop Album	Won	
2005	Bintang di Surga	Best Album Production Work	Won	
2005	"Bintang di Surga"	Best of the Best Production Work	Won	
2008	"Di Balik Awan"	Best Pop Duo/Collaboration/Group	Nominated	
2008	"Di Balik Awan"	Best Pop Recording Producer	Nominated	
2008	Hari Yang Cerah	Best Pop Album	Nominated	
2008	Hari Yang Cerah	Best Recording Album Producer	Nominated	
2013	"Separuh Aku"	Best Pop Duo/Group	Won	
2013	"Separuh Aku"	Best Pop/Urban Recording Producer	Won	
2013	"Separuh Aku"	Best of the Best Production Work	Won	
2013	"Separuh Aku"	Best Pop Song	Nominated	
2013	"Cobalah Mengerti" (feat. Momo Geisha)	Best Pop/Urban Duo/Group	Won	
2013	"Cobalah Mengerti" (feat. Momo Geisha)	Best Mix Engineer	Nominated	
2013	"Cobalah Mengerti" (feat. Momo Geisha)	Best Collaboration Production Work	Nominated	
2013	Seperti Seharusnya	Best Pop/Urban Album	Won	
2013	Seperti Seharusnya	Best of the Best Album	Won	
2013	Seperti Seharusnya	Best Recording Album Producer	Nominated	
2015	"Hero"	Best Pop Duo/Group	Won	
2015	"Hero"	Best Pop Recording Producer	Nominated	
2015	"Seperti Kemarin"	Best Pop Songwriter	Nominated	
2015	Second Chance	Best Pop Album	Nominated	
2015	Second Chance	Best Recording Album Producer	Nominated	
2015	Second Chance	Best of the Best Album	Nominated	
2016	"Sajadah Panjang"	Best Pop Duo/Group	Nominated	
2016	"Tak Terlupakan" (feat. Iwan Fals)	Best Rock Duo/Group/Collaboration	Won	
2016	"Ku Tunggu Kau Putus" (Ariel Noah and Sheryl Sheinafia)	Best Pop Collaboration	Nominated	
2016	Satu (with Iwan Fals, Nidji, Geisha and D'Masiv)	Best Pop Album	Nominated	
2016	Satu (with Iwan Fals, Nidji, Geisha and D'Masiv)	Best of the Best Album	Nominated	
2016	Satu (with Iwan Fals, Nidji, Geisha and D'Masiv)	Best Album Recording Producer	Nominated	
2018	"Jalani Mimpi"	Best Alternative Production Work	Won	
2019	"Wanitaku"	Best Pop Duo/Group	Won	
2020	Keterkaitan Keterikatan	Best of the Best Album	Won	
2020	Keterkaitan Keterikatan	Best Pop Album	Nominated	
2020	Keterkaitan Keterikatan	Best Graphic Album Design	Nominated	
2020	"Kala Cinta Menggoda"	Best of the Best Production Work	Nominated	
2020	"Kala Cinta Menggoda"	Best Pop Duo/Group	Won	
2020	"Kala Cinta Menggoda"	Best Rearrangement Production Work	Won	

== Anugerah Planet Muzik ==
The Anugerah Planet Muzik (English translation: Planet Music Awards) is an annual award given to the most popular artists from Indonesia, Singapore, and Malaysia. Noah received five awards from 24 nominations.

Year	Nominee / work	Award	Result
2004	Peterpan	Best New Group/Duo	Nominated
2005	Peterpan	Most Popular Group Artist	Nominated
2005	"Bintang Di Surga"	Best Duo/Group	Nominated
2006	"Tak Bisakah"	Best Duo/Group	Won
2006	Peterpan	Most Popular Group Artist	Won
2006	Alexandria	Best Album	Nominated
2006	"Mungkin Nanti"	Most Popular Song	Nominated
2006	"Ada Apa Denganmu"	Most Popular Song	Nominated
2007	Peterpan	Most Popular Group	Nominated
2008	Peterpan	Most Popular Group	Nominated
2008	"Menghapus Jejakmu"	Most Popular Song	Nominated
2013	"Separuh Aku"	Best Band	Won
2013	"Separuh Aku"	Best Song (Indonesia)	Nominated
2013	"Separuh Aku"	Most Popular Regional Song	Nominated
2013	Noah	Most Popular Regional Artist	Nominated
2013	Noah	Social Media Icon	Nominated
2014	"Tak Lagi Sama"	Best Band	Won
2014	"Ini Cinta"	Best Song (Indonesia)	Nominated
2014	"Hidup Untukmu Mati Tanpamu"	APM Most Popular Song	Nominated
2014	Noah	APM Most Popular Artist	Won
2014	Noah	Social Media Icon	Nominated
2015	"Seperti Kemarin"	Best Band	Nominated
2015	"Seperti Kemarin"	Best Song (Indonesia)	Nominated
2015	Noah	Social Media Icon	Nominated
2016	"Para Penerka" (feat. Iwan Fals)	Best Duo/Group	Nominated
2018	"Jalani Mimpi"	Best Band	Nominated

== Ardan Group Awards ==
Year	Nominee / work	Award	Result
2013	Noah (9125 times play in a year)	Most Widely Played Song	Won

== Asia Song Festival ==
The Asia Song Festival an annual pop music festival held in South Korea that features artists from 10 Asian countries. Participating artists receive a plaque of appreciation from the Korean Ministry of Culture, Sports and Tourism and ‘Best Asian Artist Award’ from the chairman of Korea Foundation for International Culture and Exchange. This festival is recorded and broadcast by Korean SBS, Japanese Fuji TV and 30 other broadcasters worldwide. Noah is the first band to perform in Asian festival. Noah received one award.

Year	Nominee / work	Award	Result
2007	Peterpan	Best Contribution Award	Won

== Billboard Indonesia Music Awards ==
Billboard Indonesia Music Awards is a music award show, presented by Billboard Indonesia. Noah have received two awards from two nominations.

Year	Nominee / work	Award	Result
2020	Noah	Top Duo/Group/Band of the Year	Won
2020	"Wanitaku"	Top Radio Airplay of the Year	Won

== Bintang RPTI Awards ==
Year	Nominee / work	Award	Result
2012	Noah 5 Negara 2 Benua	Favorite Music Concert Program	Won
2012	Noah	Celebrity Top Rating of the Year	Won

== Class Mild Awards ==
The Class Mild Awards is an exclusive award for Indonesian musicians. The winners are selected by a jury of music critics, musicians, and journalists. Noah received one award.

Year	Nominee / work	Award	Result
2009	Peterpan	Talk Less Do More Award	Won

== Dahsyatnya Awards ==
The Dahsyatnya Awards are annual awards presented by the daily Indonesian TV show Dahsyat that airs on RCTI. Noah received six awards from 23 nominations.

Year	Nominee / work	Award	Result
2009	Peterpan	Outstanding Band	Won
2009	"Walau Habis Terang"	Outstanding Video Clip	Won
2009	Ariel – "Walau Habis Terang" (Peterpan)	Outstanding Role in Video Clip	Nominated
2009	"Kisah Cintaku"	Outstanding Song	Nominated
2010	"Tak Ada Yang Abadi"	Outstanding Video Clip	Nominated
2010	"Tak Ada Yang Abadi"	Outstanding Director Video Clip	Nominated
2010	Peterpan – "Tak Ada Yang Abadi" (Peterpan)	Outstanding Role in Video Clip	Nominated
2013	Noah	Outstanding Band	Won
2013	"Separuh Aku"	Outstanding Song	Nominated
2013	"Separuh Aku"	Outstanding Video Clip	Nominated
2013	"Separuh Aku"	Outstanding Director Video Clip	Nominated
2013	Ariel – "Separuh Aku" (Noah)	Outstanding Model Video Clip	Nominated
2014	Noah	Outstanding Band	Nominated
2014	"Hidup Untukmu Mati Tanpamu"	Outstanding Song	Nominated
2015	"Hero"	Outstanding Video Clip	Nominated
2015	"Hero"	Outstanding Director Video Clip	Nominated
2015	"Ini Cinta"	Outstanding Video Clip	Nominated
2015	"Ini Cinta"	Outstanding Director Video Clip	Nominated
2016	Noah	Outstanding Band	Won
2016	"Menunggumu"	Outstanding Video Clip	Nominated
2016	"Menunggumu"	Outstanding Video Clip Director	Nominated
2016	"Suara Pikiranku"	Outstanding Video Clip Director	Won
2017	Noah	Outstanding Band	Won

== Fokus Selebriti Awards ==
Year	Nominee / work	Award	Result
2013	Ariel Noah & Sophia Latjuba	Hottest News	Won

== Global Seru Awards ==
The Global Seru Awards are awarded to celebrities who have caught the attention of the public through interesting or exciting accomplishments.

Year	Nominee / work	Award	Result
2014	Noah	Most Exciting Stage Act	Nominated
2015	Noah	Most Exciting Hit	Nominated

== Grazia Glitz & Glam Awards ==
Year	Nominee / work	Award	Result
2012	Noah	The Hits Celebrity	Won

== Hai Reader's Poll Music Awards ==
The Hai Reader's Poll Music Awards were presented by Indonesian magazine online Hai and to honour for artist in music. Noah received three awards from 6 nominations.

Year	Nominee / work	Award	Result
2012	Noah	The Best Pop	Won
2012	Seperti Seharusnya	The Best Album	Won
2012	"Separuh Aku"	The Best Single	Nominated
2013	Noah	The Best Pop	Won
2014	"Hero"	The Best Single	Nominated
2015	Noah	The Best Pop	Nominated

== I Gosip ==
Year	Nominee / work	Award	Result
2008	Peterpan	Most Sensational Band	Won

== Inbox Awards ==
The Inbox Awards are awarded to honour for artist in music and entertainment and presented by Inbox on SCTV. Noah received one award from 3 nominations.

Year	Nominee / work	Award	Result
2012	"Dara"	Most Inbox Video Clip	Won
2012	"Cobalah Mengerti" (feat. Momo Geisha)	Most Inbox Video Clip	Nominated
2016	Noah	Most Inbox Band	Nominated

== Indonesian Movie Awards ==
The Indonesian Movie Awards have been awarded to films since 2007.

Year	Nominee / work	Award	Result
2007	"Tak Bisakah" (Alexandria)	Favorite Soundtrack	Nominated
2010	Nazril Irham (Sang Pemimpi)	Best Newcomer Actor	Nominated

== Infotainment Awards ==
The Infotainment Awards is an award presented by SCTV since 2012. Noah received three awards from 11 nominations.

Year	Nominee / work	Award	Result
2013	Ariel Noah	Most Lure Male Celebrity	Won
2013	Noah	Most Awaited Celebrity Appearance	Won
2013	Konser Noah 2 Benua 5 Negara (Born to Make History)	Most Phenomenal World of Entertainment Events	Won
2014	Ariel Noah	Most Lure Male Celebrity	Nominated
2014	Ariel Noah	Most Awaited Celebrity Appearance	Nominated
2014	Ariel Noah	Most Fashionable Male Celebrity	Nominated
2014	Ariel Noah	Celebrity of the Year	Nominated
2015	Ariel Noah	Most Lure Male Celebrity	Nominated
2015	Ariel Noah	Sexiest Dad	Nominated
2015	David Noah & Gracia Indri	Most Phenomenal Celebrity Wedding	Nominated
2016	David Noah & Gracia Indri	Most Phenomenal Celebrity Wedding	Nominated

== Insert ==
=== Insert Awards ===
Year	Nominee / work	Award	Result
2012	Ariel Noah	Sexiest Male Celebrity	Won
2013	Ariel Noah	Sexiest Male Celebrity	Won
2014	Ariel Noah	The Iconic Celebrity	Nominated

=== Insert Fashion Awards ===
Year	Nominee / work	Award	Result
2015	Noah	Most Fashionable Group Band	Won

== Johnny Andrean Awards ==
Year	Nominee / work	Award	Result
2010	Ariel Peterpan	The Best Hair Do for Male Singer	Won

== KLIK! Awards ==
Year	Nominee / work	Award	Result
2013	"Separuh Aku"	Favorite Pop Video	Nominated

== Maya Awards ==
The Maya Awards (Indonesian translation: Piala Maya), is an annual Indonesian film awards initiated in 2012 by Indonesian online film enthusiasts, that is initiated by @FILM_Indonesia Twitter account. It follows the concept of similar awards, with nominations and awards given to each year's best local productions. Noah received one award from 2 nominations.

Year	Nominee / work	Award	Result
2013	Noah: Awal Semula	Best Feature Film	Nominated
2013	Noah: Awal Semula	Best Editing	Won

== MTV Awards ==
=== MTV Ampuh ===
Year	Nominee / work	Award	Result
2004	"Ada Apa Denganmu"	Song of the Year	Won
2004	Peterpan	Group/Duo Artist of the Year	Won

=== MTV Asia Awards ===
The MTV Asia Awards is a show that gives recognition and awards for Asian and international in achievements in cinema, fashion, humanitarian pursuits, and music. Most of the awards are voted for by viewers from the Asian region. Noah received three awards.

Year	Nominee / work	Award	Result
2005	Peterpan	Favorite Artist Indonesia	Won
2005	Bintang di Surga	Most Sold Album of the Year	Won
2006	Peterpan	Favorite Artist Indonesia	Won

=== MTV Europe Music Awards ===
The MTV Europe Music Awards are awarded by MTV Networks Europe to popular music videos in Europe. The awards are chosen by European MTV viewers. Since 2011, other worldwide/regional nominations have been added. The awards are presented annually and broadcast live on MTV Europe, MTV Live HD and most of the international MTV channels as well as online.

Year	Nominee / work	Award	Result
2013	Noah	Best Southeast Asian Act	Nominated
2014	Noah	Best Southeast Asian Act	Nominated
2015	Noah	Best Southeast Asian Act	Nominated

=== MTV Indonesia Awards ===
The MTV Indonesia Awards are presented by MTV Indonesia, as chosen by their viewers throughout Indonesia. Noah received three awards from 5 nominations.

Year	Nominee / work	Award	Result
2005	Bintang di Surga	Most Selling Album of the Year	Won
2006	"Bintang di Surga"	Video of the Year	Won
2006	"Bintang di Surga"	Best Director	Nominated
2006	"Menunggu Pagi"	Best Director	Nominated
2009	Peterpan	Most Inspiring Artist	Won

=== MTV Indonesia Movie Awards ===
The MTV Indonesia Movie Awards is an awards show in Indonesia similar to the MTV Movie Awards.

Year	Nominee / work	Award	Result
2006	"Tak Bisakah" (Alexandria)	Best Song in Movie	Nominated

== Nickelodeon Indonesia Kids' Choice Awards ==
The Nickelodeon Indonesia Kids' Choice Awards is Indonesian version of Nickelodeon Kids' Choice Awards, held since 2008 in Jakarta. Noah received two awards from 5 nominations.

Year	Nominee / work	Award	Result
2009	Peterpan	Favorite Band	Won
2013	Noah	Favorite Band	Won
2014	Noah	Favorite Band	Nominated
2015	Noah	Favorite Group/Band/Duo	Nominated
2017	Noah	Favorite Singer	Nominated

== Oz Radio Bandung FM Awards ==
The Oz Radio Bandung FM Awards are an online radio awards were presented by OZ Radio FM, for talent musician/singer who have listed of 'friendly' in music.

Year	Nominee / work	Award	Result
2017	Noah	Most Friendly Band	Nominated
2017	"Andaikan Kau Datang"	Most Friendly Cover/Recycle	Nominated
2017	"Yang Terlupakan" (feat. Iwan Fals)	Most Friendly Collaboration	Nominated

== Pop Awards ==
The Pop Awards are an awards for celebrities which popular and also inspire for young generation. It is a first established in RCTI.

Year	Nominee / work	Award	Result
2016	Ariel Noah	Male Pop Awards	Nominated

== Rolling Stones Editors' Choice Awards ==
The Rolling Stones Editors' Choice Awards are an annual awards were created by Rolling Stone Indonesia magazine for outstanding contribution and achievement which their earning in popular culture. Noah has received one award.

Year	Nominee / work	Award	Result
2009	"Ku Katakan Dengan Indah"	Best Song	Won

== SCTV Awards ==
The SCTV Awards is an award given by the Indonesian television station SCTV, based on the audience's votes. Noah received five awards from 12 nominations.

Year	Nominee / work	Award	Result
2005	Peterpan	Famous Group Band	Won
2006	Peterpan	Famous Group Band	Nominated
2007	Peterpan	Famous Group Band	Nominated
2008	Peterpan	Famous Group Band	Nominated
2009	Peterpan	Famous Group Band	Nominated
2012	Noah	Famous Group Band	Won
2013	Noah	Famous Group Band	Won
2014	Noah	Famous Group Band	Nominated
2015	Noah	Famous Group Band	Won
2015	"Menunggumu" (Ganteng-Ganteng Serigala Return)	Famous Soap Opera Soundtrack	Nominated
2015	"Tak Bisakah" (Ganteng-Ganteng Serigala Return)	Famous Soap Opera Soundtrack	Nominated
2016	Noah	Famous Group Band	Won

== SCTV Music Awards ==
The SCTV Music Awards is an award given by Indonesian television station SCTV for the most popular songs, albums, and artists based on the audience's votes. Noah has received ten awards from 26 nominations.

Year	Nominee / work	Award	Result
2004	Taman Langit	Famous Newcomer Album	Won
2005	Bintang di Surga	Famous Pop Group Album	Won
2005	"Ku Katakan Dengan Indah"	Most Famous Song	Won
2006	Alexandria	Famous Pop Duo/Group Album	Won
2009	Sebuah Nama Sebuah Cerita	Famous Pop Duo/Group Album	Nominated
2009	"Kisah Cintaku"	Most Famous Song	Nominated
2009	Reza Peterpan	Favorite Drummer Player	Nominated
2009	Uki Peterpan	Favorite Guitarist Player	Nominated
2009	Ariel Peterpan	Favorite Vocalist Band	Nominated
2013	Noah	Most Famous Duo/Group Band	Won
2013	"Separuh Aku"	Most Famous Song	Nominated
2013	Ariel Noah	Most Famous Vocalist Band	Won
2013	Loekman Noah	Most Famous Guitar Player	Nominated
2013	David Noah	Most Famous Keyboard Player	Won
2013	Reza Noah	Most Famous Drum Player	Nominated
2014	Noah	Most Famous Duo/Group Band	Won
2014	Ariel Noah	Most Famous Vocalist Band	Won
2014	Uki Noah	Most Famous Guitar Player	Nominated
2014	David Noah	Most Famous Keyboard Player	Nominated
2014	Reza Noah	Most Famous Drum Player	Nominated
2015	Ariel Noah	Most Famous Vocalist Band	Nominated
2015	David Noah	Most Famous Keyboard Player	Nominated
2016	Noah	Most Famous Duo/Group Band	Won
2016	"Yang Terlupakan" (feat. Iwan Fals)	Most Famous Collaboration	Nominated
2016	"Kutunggu Kau Putus" (Ariel Noah & Sheryl Sheinafia)	Most Famous Collaboration	Nominated
2017	Noah	Most Famous Group Band	Nominated

== Silet Awards ==
The Silet Awards is an annual awards show held by the infotainment show Silet for artists and shows broadcast on RCTI.

Year	Nominee / work	Award	Result
2014	Ariel Noah & Sophia Latjuba	Razored Romance	Nominated

== World Music Awards ==
The World Music Awards is an international awards show founded in 1989 under the patronage of Albert II, Prince of Monaco and based in Monte Carlo. Awards are presented to the world's best selling artist in various categories and to the best-selling artist from each major territory. Sales figures are provided by the International Federation of the Phonographic Industry.

Year	Nominee / work	Award	Result
2014	Ariel Noah	World's Best Male Artist	Nominated
2014	Ariel Noah	World's Best Entertainer of the Year	Nominated
2014	Noah	World's Best Group	Nominated
2014	Noah	World's Best Live Act	Nominated
2014	"Jika Engkau"	World's Best Video	Nominated

== Yahoo! OMG Awards ==
Established in 2012, the Yahoo! OMG Awards are an awards were presented by Yahoo! Indonesia to honour for celebrities in music, film, news and television, based on voted online by fans in Yahoo! websites. Noah has received two awards from 6 nominations.

Year	Nominee / work	Award	Result
2012	Ariel Noah & Luna Maya	Most Shocking Break-Up	Won
2012	Noah	Band of the Year	Won
2013	Noah	Best Group	Nominated
2013	Uki Noah	Sexiest Dad	Nominated
2014	Ariel Noah	Sexiest Dad	Nominated
2014	Ariel Noah & Sophia Latjuba	Favorite Couple	Nominated

== Honor Awards, Magazine, Newspaper ==
=== Bintang Magazine ===
Year	Nominee / work	Award	Result
2012	Noah	Star of the Year	Won

=== Hai Magazine ===
Year	Nominee / work	Award	Result
2002	Peterpan	Rookie of the Year	Won

=== MURI Records ===
Year	Nominee / work	Award	Result
2004	Peterpan	Record for Performing in Six Cities in 24 Hours	Won
2012	Noah	Record for Concert 5 Countries, 2 Continent, 24 Hours	Won

=== Musica Studio Indonesia ===
Year	Nominee / work	Award	Result
2004	Taman Langit	Triple Platinum Award	Won
2013	Seperti Seharusnya	Multi Platinum Award	Won
