= List of songs recorded by Noah =

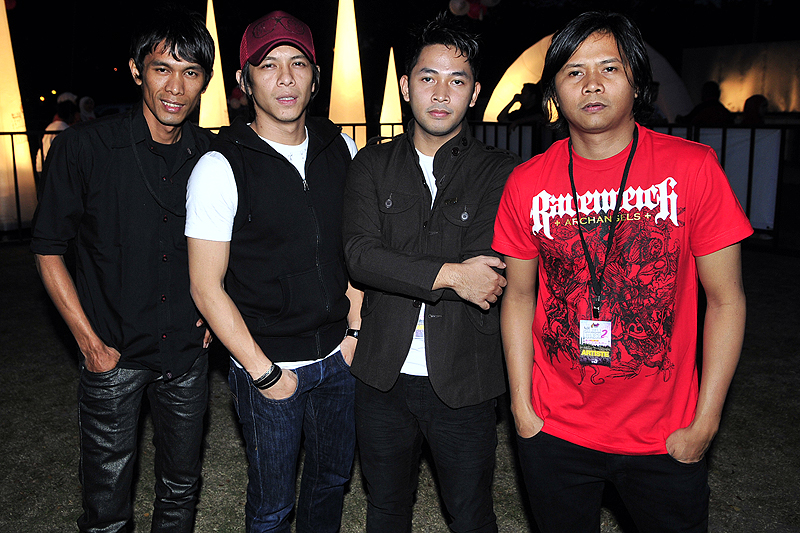
Peterpan at a concert in Kuala Lumpur, Malaysia in 2008.

Indonesian rock band Noah has recorded 80 songs since they were formed in 2000 in Bandung, Jawa Barat under the name "Peterpan" by Ariel (vocals), Andika (keyboards), Indra (bass), Lukman (guitar), Reza (drums), and Uki (guitar). The style of their songs are usually considered to be alternative rock and pop rock, along with less-mentioned post-Britpop, electronic rock, pop, and grunge. The lyrics of the songs tend to be themed around romance, friendship, life, and abstract thoughts. Most of their songs are written by Ariel.

The first song they recorded for release is "Mimpi yang Sempurna", which was recorded for Musica Studio's compilation album Kisah 2002 Malam (2002). The song was released as a single and helped the album sold 150.000 copies. Peterpan soon joined Musica Studio's and recorded three studio albums, Taman Langit (2003), Bintang di Surga (2004), and Hari yang Cerah (2007); a soundtrack album, Alexandria (2005); and a compilation album, Sebuah Nama, Sebuah Cerita (2008). Due to Andika and Indra's split from the band in 2006, the band dropped the Peterpan name in 2008 and used the band members' names as a placeholder. The initial plan to announce their new name in 2010 was delayed because Ariel was arrested that year due to a celebrity sex tape featuring him. During Ariel's time in prison, the band recorded instrumental version of their songs which was released in Suara Lainnya (2012).

After Ariel was released from prison, the band announced their new name: Noah, on 2 August 2012. They followed it up with releasing their first song as Noah, "Separuh Aku", on 3 August, which helped their debut album as Noah, Seperti Seharusnya (2012), sold over one million copies. In addition to recording new songs, the band re-recorded most of Peterpan's songs in a project titled "Second Chance", which consisted of four albums: Second Chance (2014), Taman Langit (2021), Bintang di Surga (2022), and Hari yang Cerah (2022). During Noah era, Ariel's part in songwriting decreased as he said that he had difficulty writing lyrics and the band thus collaborated with other song and book writers to help with the lyrics.

== Songs recorded as Peterpan (2000–2009) ==
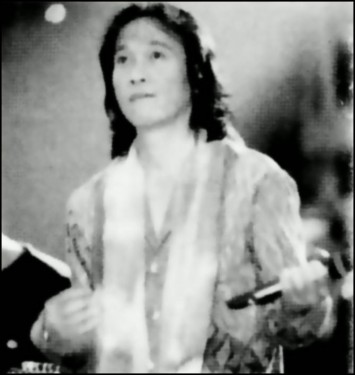
Peterpan collaborated with Chrisye on "Menunggumu" in Chrisye's album, Senyawa (2004). Peterpan and Noah also has covered several Chrisye's song, namely "Kisah Cintaku", "Sendiri Lagi", and "Kala Cinta Menggoda".

List of released songs, showing title, songwriter, lyrics writer, original release and year
Title	Songwriter	Lyrics writer	Original release	Year	Ref.
"2 DSD" (Note: This song is titled "Tetap Berdiri (2DSD)" in the re-recorded version of Bintang di Surga (2022).)	Nazril Irham	Nazril Irham	Bintang di Surga	2004	
"Ada Apa Denganmu"	Nazril Irham	Nazril Irham	Bintang di Surga	2004	
"Aku"	Nazril Irham; Andika Naliputra	Nazril Irham; Andika Naliputra	Bintang di Surga	2004	
"Aku & Bintang" (Note: This song is re-recorded for Alexandria (2005).)	Nazril Irham	Nazril Irham	Taman Langit	2003	
"Ayah (Aceh)" (Rinto Harahap cover) (featuring Candil Seurieus)	Rinto Harahap	Rinto Harahap	Dari Hati untuk Aceh	2005	
"Bebas"	Nazril Irham	Nazril Irham	Hari yang Cerah	2007	
"Bintang di Surga"	Nazril Irham	Nazril Irham	Bintang di Surga	2004	
"Cobalah Mengerti"	Lukman Hakim; Nazril Irham	Lukman Hakim; Nazril Irham	Hari yang Cerah	2007	
"Dan Hilang"	Nazril Irham	Nazril Irham	Taman Langit	2003	
"Di Balik Awan"	Nazril Irham	Nazril Irham	Hari yang Cerah	2007	
"Di Belakangku"	Nazril Irham	Nazril Irham	Bintang di Surga	2004	
"Diatas Normal"	Nazril Irham	Nazril Irham	Bintang di Surga	2004	
"Dilema Besar"	Lukman Hakim	Nazril Irham	Sebuah Nama, Sebuah Cerita	2008	
"Dunia yang Terlupa"	Lukman Hakim	Lukman Hakim	Hari yang Cerah	2007	
"Hari yang Cerah untuk Jiwa yang Sepi"	Lukman Hakim; Nazril Irham	Nazril Irham	Hari yang Cerah	2007	
"Jauh Mimpiku"	Lukman Hakim; Hendra Suhendra	Ryan Reza; Andika Naliputra	Alexandria	2005	
"Khayalan Tingkat Tinggi"	Nazril Irham	Nazril Irham	Bintang di Surga	2004	
"Kisah Cintaku" (Note: This song is also included in Sings Legends (2016).) (Chrisye cover)	Tito Soemarsono	Tito Soemarsono	Sebuah Nama, Sebuah Cerita	2008	
"Kita Tertawa"	Lukman Hakim	Nazril Irham	Taman Langit	2003	
"Kota Mati"	Lukman Hakim; Nazril Irham	Lukman Hakim; Nazril Irham	Hari yang Cerah	2007	
"Ku Katakan Dengan Indah"	Nazril Irham	Nazril Irham	Bintang di Surga	2004	
"Kupu-Kupu Malam" (Titiek Puspa cover)	Titiek Puspa	Titiek Puspa	From Us to U	2005	
"Langit Tak Mendengar"	Lukman Hakim; Nazril Irham	Nazril Irham	Alexandria	2005	
"Lihat Langkahku"	Lukman Hakim	Lukman Hakim	Hari yang Cerah	2007	
"Marilah Kemari" (Titiek Puspa cover) (as part of All Artist)	Titiek Puspa	Titiek Puspa	From Us to U	2005	
"Masa Lalu Tertinggal"	Nazril Irham; Hendra Suhendra	Hendra Suhendra	Bintang di Surga	2004	
"Melawan Dunia"	Nazril Irham	Nazril Irham	Hari yang Cerah	2007	
"Membebaniku"	Moh. Kautsar Hikmat	Nazril Irham	Alexandria	2005	
"Menghapus Jejakmu"	Nazril Irham	Nazril Irham; Eross Candra (Note: Eross Candra only started to receive this credit since the re-recorded version of Hari yang Cerah (2022).)	Hari yang Cerah	2007	
"Menunggu Pagi"	Moh. Kautsar Hikmat	Nazril Irham	Alexandria	2005	
"Menunggumu" (featuring Chrisye)	Nazril Irham	Nazril Irham	Senyawa	2004	
"Mimpi yang Sempurna" (Note: This song is re-arranged in Taman Langit (2003).)	Nazril Irham	Nazril Irham	Kisah 2002 Malam	2002	
"Mungkin Nanti"	Nazril Irham	Nazril Irham	Bintang di Surga	2004	
"Sahabat"	Nazril Irham; Lukman Hakim; Moh. Kautsar Hikmat	Nazril Irham	Taman Langit	2003	
"Sally Sendiri"	Nazril Irham	Nazril Irham	Hari yang Cerah	2007	
"Satu Hati"	Nazril Irham	Nazril Irham	Taman Langit	2003	
"Semua Tentang Kita"	Nazril Irham	Nazril Irham	Taman Langit	2003	
"Tak Ada yang Abadi"	Nazril Irham	Nazril Irham	Sebuah Nama, Sebuah Cerita	2008	
"Tak Bisakah"	Nazril Irham	Nazril Irham	Alexandria	2005	
"Taman Langit"	Nazril Irham	Nazril Irham	Taman Langit	2003	
"Tertinggalkan Waktu"	Nazril Irham	Nazril Irham	Taman Langit	2003	
"Topeng"	Nazril Irham	Nazril Irham	Taman Langit	2003	
"Walau Habis Terang"	Nazril Irham	Nazril Irham	Sebuah Nama, Sebuah Cerita	2008	
"Yang Terdalam"	Nazril Irham	Nazril Irham	Taman Langit	2003	

== Songs recorded as Ariel, Uki, Lukman, Reza, David (2009–2012) ==
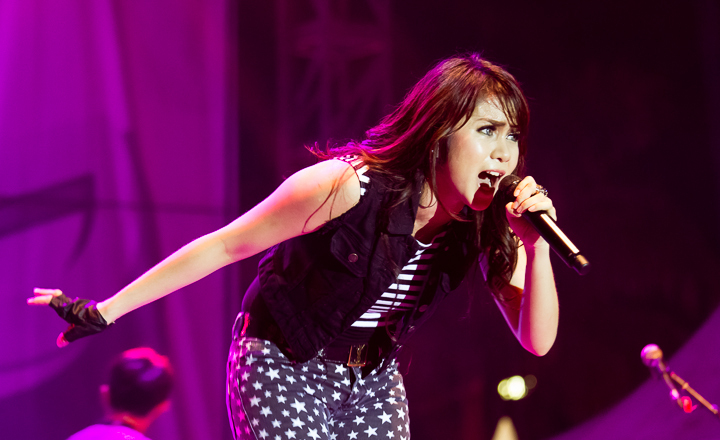
Geisha's then-vocalist Momo recorded the vocals for the version of "Cobalah Mengerti' in Suara Lainnya.

As Ariel, Uki, Lukman, Reza, David, the band released an instrumental album Suara Lainnya (2012), which consisted of instrumental arrangement of Peterpan's songs, "Diatas Normal", "Kota Mati", "Sahabat", "Walau Habis Terang", "Di Belakangku", "Melawan Dunia", "Langit Tak Mendengar", "Taman Langit", and "Bintang di Surga" and a version of "Cobalah Mengerti" sung by Geisha's then-vocalist Momo. The instrumental arrangement of the songs include various genres such as jazz, fusion, orchestra, and traditional music."

== Songs recorded as Noah (2012–sekarang) ==
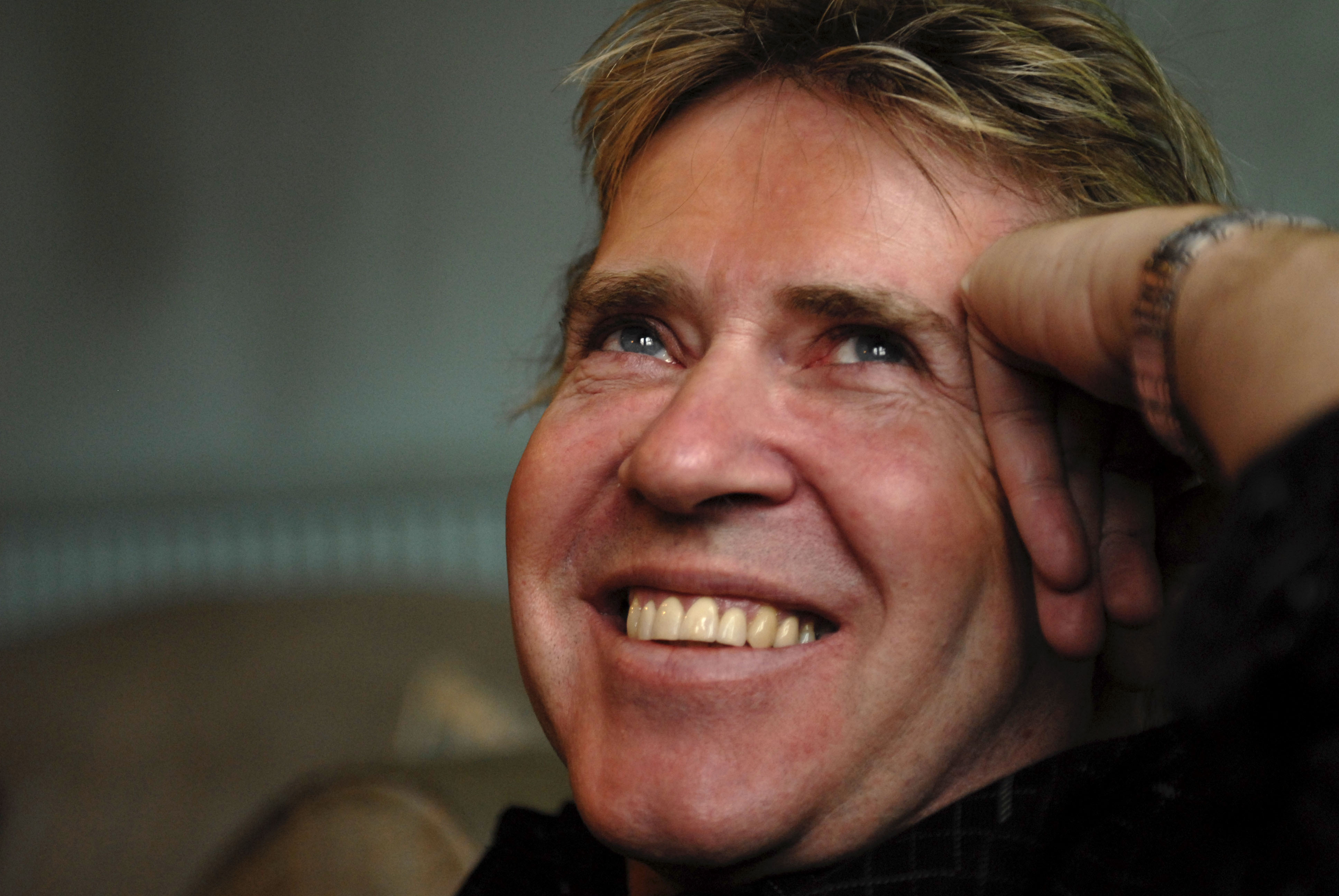
English producer Steve Lillywhite produced "Hero", "Seperti Kemarin" and "Suara Pikiranku" in Second Chance.

In addition recording new songs, Noah re-recorded most of their songs from the Peterpan era, naming the project "Second Chance" and citing several reasons: wanting their old song to be released under Noah name, a desire to improve the recordings since some songs were not recorded the way they wished, and in order to properly adapt their old songs to digital format. The project consists of four albums: Second Chance, which was released in 2014 and contained re-recordings of songs from Peterpan's albums Alexandria and Sebuah Nama, Sebuah Cerita, and the re-recorded version of Taman Langit, Bintang di Surga, and Hari yang Cerah albums which was released throughout December 2021–February 2022. Songs written by Andika and Indra are not re-recorded, namely "Jauh Mimpiku", "Aku" and "Masa Lalu Tertinggal".

Key
#	Re-recorded version of Ariel's song

List of released songs, showing title, songwriter, lyrics writer, original release and year
Title	Songwriter	Lyrics writer	Original release	Year	Ref.
"Abadi" (as part of All Stars)	Nazril Irham; Virgiawan Listanto; Giring Ganesha; Steve Lillywhite; Rian Ekky Pradipta; Randy Danistha; Roby Satria	Nazril Irham; Virgiawan Listanto; Giring Ganesha; Steve Lillywhite; Rian Ekky Pradipta; Randy Danistha; Roby Satria	Satu	2015	
"Andaikan Kau Datang" (Koes Plus cover)	Tonny Koeswoyo	Tonny Koeswoyo	Sings Legends	2016	
"Badai Pasti Berlalu" (Berlian Hutauruk cover)	Eros Djarot	Eros Djarot	Non-album single	2021	
"Biar Ku Sendiri" (The Mercy's cover)	Charles Hutagalung	Charles Hutagalung	Sings Legends	2016	
"Cinta Bukan Dusta" (Rinto Harahap cover)	Rinto Harahap	Rinto Harahap	Kami Mengenang Rinto Harahap	2015	
"Dara" #	Nazril Irham	Nazril Irham	Second Chance	2014	
"Demi Kita"	Lukman Hakim	Lukman Hakim	Seperti Seharusnya	2012	
"Hero"	Nazril Irham	Giring Ganesha	Second Chance	2014	
"Hidup Untukmu, Mati Tanpamu"	Nazril Irham	Rian Ekky Pradipta	Seperti Seharusnya	2012	
"Ini Cinta"	Nazril Irham	Nazril Irham	Seperti Seharusnya	2012	
"Jalani Mimpi"	Lukman Hakim	Lukman Hakim; Moh. Kautsar Hikmat; Muhammad Dwi Maulana	Keterkaitan Keterikatan	2017	
"Jika Engkau"	Lukman Hakim	Nazril Irham	Seperti Seharusnya	2012	
"Kala Cinta Menggoda" (Chrisye cover)	Guruh Soekarnoputra	Guruh Soekarnoputra	Puspa Ragam Karya	2020	
"Kau Udara Bagiku"	Nazril Irham	Nazril Irham	Keterkaitan Keterikatan	2019	
"Kemesraan" (Franky Sahilatua and Jane Sahilatua cover) (as part of All Stars)	Franky Sahilatua; Johnny Sahilatua	Franky Sahilatua; Johnny Sahilatua	Satu	2015	
"Kupeluk Hatimu"	David Albert	Nazril Irham; David Albert; Rian Ekky Pradipta; Sabrang Mowo Damar Panuluh; Marchella FP; M. Aan Mansyur	Keterkaitan Keterikatan	2019	
"Mencari Cinta" (featuring Bunga Citra Lestari)	Lukman Hakim	Nazril Irham; Mohammad Istiqamah Djamad	Keterkaitan Keterikatan	2019	
"Mendekati Lugu"	Nazril Irham	Nazril Irham	Keterkaitan Keterikatan	2019	
"Menemaniku"	David Albert	David Albert	Keterkaitan Keterikatan	2019	
"My Situation"	Nazril Irham	Moh. Kautsar Hikmat; Muhammad Dwi Maulana	Keterkaitan Keterikatan	2017	
"Night Ambience"	Nazril Irham	Nazril Irham	Seperti Seharusnya	2012	
"Para Penerka" (with Iwan Fals)	Nazril Irham; Virgiawan Listanto	Nazril Irham; Virgiawan Listanto	Satu	2015	
"Puisi Adinda"	Nazril Irham	Nazril Irham	Seperti Seharusnya	2012	
"Raja Negeriku"	Nazril Irham; Moh. Kautsar Hikmat	Nazril Irham; Moh. Kautsar Hikmat	Seperti Seharusnya	2012	
"Sajadah Panjang" (Bimbo cover)	Jaka Bimbo; Taufiq Ismail	Jaka Bimbo; Taufiq Ismail	Sings Legends	2016	
"Sendiri Lagi" (Chrisye cover)	Ryan Kyoto	Ryan Kyoto	Seperti Seharusnya	2012	
"Sendiri Lagi (Remix)" (Chrisye cover) (featuring Angger Dimas)	Ryan Kyoto	Ryan Kyoto	Sings Legends	2016	
"Separuh Aku"	David Albert; Ihsan Nurrachman	David Albert; Ihsan Nurrachman	Seperti Seharusnya	2012	
"Seperti Kemarin"	Nazril Irham; Dewi Lestari	Nazril Irham; Dewi Lestari	Second Chance	2014	
"Suara Pikiranku"	Nazril Irham; Lukman Hakim	Nazril Irham; Lukman Hakim	Second Chance	2014	
"Tak Lagi Sama"	David Albert; Ihsan Nurrachman	David Albert; Ihsan Nurrachman	Seperti Seharusnya	2012	
"Terbangun Sendiri"	Nazril Irham	Nazril Irham	Seperti Seharusnya	2012	
"Tinggallah Ku Sendiri" (Nike Ardilla cover)	Yuke NS	Yuke NS	Sings Legends	2016	
"우리의 이야기 Urieui Iyagi (Semua Tentang Kita)" (featuring Shakira Jasmine)	Nazril Irham	Nazril Irham; Miyoung Jang (translator)	Keterkaitan Keterikatan - Acoustic Version in 360° (Part 1)	2021	
"Wanitaku"	Nazril Irham	Nazril Irham; Pongki Barata	Keterkaitan Keterikatan	2019	
"Yang Terlupakan" (Iwan Fals cover) (with Iwan Fals)	Virgiawan Listanto	Virgiawan Listanto	Satu	2015	
