= Second Chance (Noah album) =

Studio album (re-recorded) by Noah
- Released: 31 December 2014
- Recorded: 2014
- Genres: Pop rock; alternative rock; britpop
- Length: 47:25
- Label: Musica Studios
- Producers: Noah; Steve Lillywhite

Noah chronology
Seperti Seharusnya (2012)	Second Chance (2014)	Sings Legends (2016)

Singles from Second Chance
- 1. "Hero" Released: August 6, 2014; 2. "Seperti Kemarin" Released: November 21, 2014; 3. "Menunggumu" Released: June 1, 2015; 4. "Suara Pikiranku" Released: September 2, 2015

Second Chance is the first re-recorded album and the second album overall released by Indonesian alternative rock band Noah after changing their name. It consists of three new songs produced by British producer Steve Lillywhite and nine re-recordings of non-studio album songs that Noah recorded under Peterpan name. The album was released on December 31, 2014, by Musica Studios. The album was Reza's last with the group, as he left the band on January 1, 2015. The album was nominated for "Best Pop Album", "Best of the Best Album", and "Best Recording Album Producer" at the 2015 Anugerah Musik Indonesia.

== Songs ==
New songs on this album are "Hero", "Seperti Kemarin", and "Suara Pikiranku". These are three new songs, produced by the British producer Steve Lillywhite. The remaining nine songs are new arrangements of four songs from Sebuah Nama Sebuah Cerita, four songs from Alexandria, and the vocalist Ariel's single that was previously included in Suara Lainnya.

== Promotion ==
This album was only sold in the retail network of Trans Corp., which includes Trans Fashion, Trans F&B (Coffee Bean, Wendy's, Baskin-Robbins), TransVision, Carrefour, Kawasan Trans Studio (Bandung and Makassar), Metro Department Store, and Bank Mega.

As part of the album promotion, Noah held a tour in United States. The tour was originally planned to be held in April 2015. But it ended up being delayed to October 2015.

=== Singles ===
Prior to releasing Second Chance, Noah had released two singles from this album in 2014. "Hero" was released as the album's first single via radio airplay in August 6 and via iTunes in August 7. Its music video was released on Musica Studio's YouTube channel in September 22. The second single is "Seperti Kemarin", which was released in November 13 on iTunes and in November 21 via radio. The music video for "Seperti Kemarin" was released after the album's release, on January 7, 2015.

After the album was released, Noah made two music video for two songs from this album: "Menunggumu" (the only old song in this album to receive a music video) and "Suara Pikiranku". The music video for "Menunggumu" was released on June 1, 2015, while the music video for "Suara Pikiranku" was released on September 2, 2015.

== Track listing ==
No.	Title	Writer(s)	Original album	Length
1.	"Hero"	Ariel; Giring Ganesha	New song	3:47
2.	"Seperti Kemarin" (Like Yesterday)	Ariel; Dewi Lestari	New song	3:48
3.	"Suara Pikiranku" (My Mind's Sound)	Lukman; Ariel	New song	4:23
4.	"Langit Tak Mendengar" (The Sky Doesn't Hear)	Lukman; Ariel	Alexandria (2005)	4:00
5.	"Membebaniku" (Burdening Me)	Uki; Ariel	Alexandria	3:54
6.	"Dilema Besar" (The Great Dilemma)	Lukman; Ariel	Sebuah Nama, Sebuah Cerita (2008)	4:10
7.	"Walau Habis Terang" (Although the Light Is Gone)	Ariel	Sebuah Nama, Sebuah Cerita	3:39
8.	"Tak Bisakah" (Can't You)	Ariel	Alexandria	3:52
9.	"Menunggu Pagi" (Waiting for the Morning)	Uki; Ariel	Alexandria	4:16
10.	"Tak Ada Yang Abadi" (Nothing Lasts Forever)	Ariel	Sebuah Nama, Sebuah Cerita	4:17
11.	"Dara" (The Girl)	Ariel	Ariel's solo single (2011)	3:32
12.	"Menunggumu" (Waiting for You)	Ariel	Senyawa (2004)	3:47
Total length:				47:25

== Personnel ==
Additional musicians and production personnel credits is adapted from the album liner notes.

Noah

- Ariel – vocals
- David – keyboard
- Lukman – guitar
- Reza – drum
- Uki – guitar

Additional musician

- Boyi Tondo – bass guitar
- Henry Lamiri – strings

Production personnel

- Ross Hogarth – mixing on track 1–3
- Josep Manurung – engineering, mixing on track 4–6 and 8–12
- Stevan Santoso – mixing on track 7
- Ted Jensen – mastering
- Gita Roni Chandra – Pro Tools editor
- Horas Pinem – engineering
- Madi – engineering
- Toni – engineering
- Teddy Riadi – sound supervisor

== Awards and nominations ==
Year	Awards	Category	Result	Ref.
2015	Anugerah Musik Indonesia	Best Pop Album	Nominated	
2015	Anugerah Musik Indonesia	Best of the Best Album	Nominated	
2015	Anugerah Musik Indonesia	Best Recording Album Producer	Nominated	
