= Keterkaitan Keterikatan =

2019 studio album by Noah

Studio album by Noah
- Released: 14 August 2019
- Recorded: 2017–2019
- Studio: Musica Studio's, Jakarta; NOAH Studio, Jakarta
- Genre: Pop rock; pop; alternative rock; soft rock; post-Britpop
- Length: 33:29
- Label: Musica Studio's
- Producer: Noah; Capung

Noah chronology
Sings Legends (2016)	Keterkaitan Keterikatan (2019)	Keterkaitan Keterikatan - Acoustic Version in 360° (2021)

Singles from Keterkaitan Keterikatan
- 1. "Jalani Mimpi" / "My Situation" Released: 16 September 2017 (Note: On iTunes, "Jalani Mimpi" and "My Situation" are released as separate singles. While on JOOX and Spotify, they are released as a single, titled "New Singles".); 2. "Wanitaku" Released: 14 June 2019; 3. "Kupeluk Hatimu" Released: 26 July 2019; 4. "Kau Udara Bagiku" Released: 8 August 2019; 5. "Mendekati Lugu" Released: 10 August 2019; 6. "Menemaniku" Released: 16 September 2020; 7. "Mencari Cinta" Released: 23 April 2021

Keterkaitan Keterikatan is the second studio album to be recorded by Indonesian pop rock band Noah. The album, which was released in August 2019 on Musica Studio's label, is the last album on which guitarist Uki worked before he left the band on 8 August 2019.

After releasing their cover album Sings Legends in 2016, Noah started working on Keterkaitan Keterikatan, which was planned to be released in 2017 but was postponed until 2019 due to difficulty with writing the lyrics. To finish the album quickly, Noah got help from Java Jive guitarist Capung to produce the album, and the band collaborated with several musicians and writers to finish the lyrics.

Keterkaitan Keterikatan consists of eight songs and a bonus track, a single by Ariel of Noah with Ariel of Nidji, which is only available on the physical release. The album was released on compact disc format on 14 August 2019 and on digital music services on 24 August 2019. The album tracks "My Situation" and "Jalani Mimpi" were released as singles in 2017, two years before the album was finished. The next singles; "Wanitaku", "Kupeluk Hatimu", "Kau Udara Bagiku", and "Mendekati Lugu"; were released near the album's 2019 release date. The album was well-received commercially and critically, winning the Best of the Best Album award in the 23rd annual Anugerah Musik Indonesia ceremony.

== Background ==
In May 2016, Noah released Sings Legends, an album consisting of covers of Indonesian songs the band members consider legendary. After promoting it, they planned to make an album of original songs, which they last did in 2012 with their first album Seperti Seharusnya. Noah planned to release the album in 2017.

== Writing and recording ==
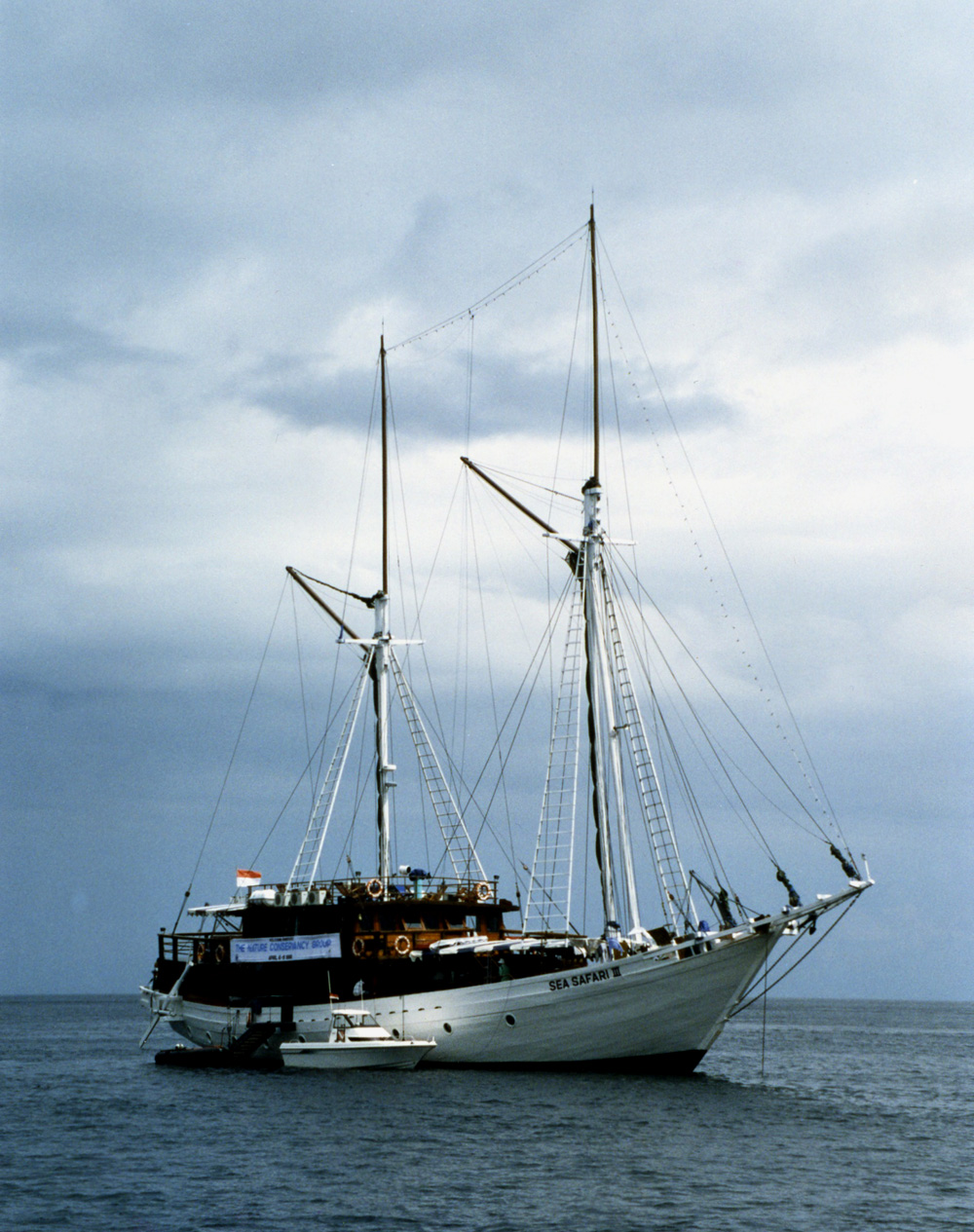
Pinisi boat, the type that Noah used when working on the album.

In November 2016, Noah started collecting song material for their new album. In February 2017, they, along with additional members, worked on the album in isolation on a seaborne pinisi boat for one week. Noah said they wanted to get a different feel from the regular feel they get in a studio. Based on a similar experience when working on Bintang di Surga (2004) when they were named Peterpan, the band believed working in isolation could help them focus. Noah originally planned to finish the lyrics for the album's first single, "Wanitaku" during this one-week period but they had difficulties working on the sea because of the poor weather and waves. After that, the band again worked in a villa in Puncak, Bogor Regency, where Noah wrote the songs "Jalani Mimpi" and "Kupeluk Hatimu". Afterwards, they worked on the album in Jakarta.

Noah worked on the album for two years. During a press conference on 14 September 2017, vocalist Ariel said they were still trying to find the right sound for the album. In July 2018, Ariel said the music for the album was almost completed but the lyrics were not. Ariel said he was struggling with writer's block and had difficulty finding new words for the lyrics. To get the album done as quickly as possible, Noah asked for help from Java Jive guitarist Capung, who produced Peterpan's albums. The band also collaborated with several musician and authors to finish the lyrics.

At the end of 2018, Ariel said the addition of a new song to the album had delayed its release. Noah, however, removed the song "Suara dalam Kepala" from the album because they were not satisfied with it and reserved it for their next album.

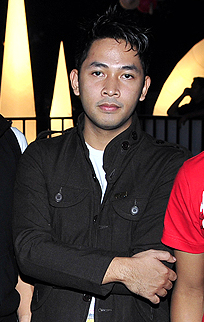
Uki resigned from the band after his work on Keterkaitan Keterikatan was finished.

Keterkaitan Keterikatan is the last album on which guitarist, Uki, worked before resigning from Noah on 8 August 2019. Uki wanted to leave the band for six months before the album's release but he kept working on it until it was finished.

== Themes ==
Most of the songs on Keterkaitan Keterikatan are themed around love. According to Ariel, each song covers different perspectives of love. According to their respective lyricist, "Wanitaku" is about a man who is worried about his partner's ambition; "Mendekati Lugu" describes someone who is obsessed with love; "Kau Udara Bagiku" describes the singer's partner's importance; and the English-language song "My Situation" is about a man's turmoil when facing a situation from which he cannot escape. Besides the love songs, the album also contains "Menemaniku" which according to its writer David, is about a difficult situation and the way God never leaves during such situation; and the closing song "Jalani Mimpi" has a message for listeners to keep following their dreams.

== Artwork ==
The cover of Keterkaitan Keterikatan was designed by Thovfa and the photography was done by MadTone Photography. The album cover depicts the band members posing between red strings that are connected to the band logo. Ariel said the idea to insert a physical version of the logo came from their 2015 music video for "Suara Pikiranku", which features a large, physical version of the logo. The strings was strung by Dennis Sutanto, who previously worked on the music video for "Suara Pikiranku". For designing the album's artwork, Thofva was nominated for Best Album Graphic Design at the 23rd annual Anugerah Musik Indonesia.

== Release and promotion ==
=== Early promotion (2017) ===
Noah originally planned to release "Wanitaku", the lead single of Keterkaitan Keterikatan, during a concert on 11 February 2017 in Gili Trawangan after working in isolation on a pinisi boat on the nearby sea. Because the band had not yet completed the lyrics for "Wanitaku", they only played the song's chorus. They told the audience about their progress on the boat.

On 16 September 2017, Noah released the album tracks "Jalani Mimpi" and "My Situation" as singles. On the same day, the band held a concert titled Road to New Album in Pangkalan Udara Sulaiman, Bandung Regency. On the concert, they performed some of the song material from the album and said they were still far from completing the album.

=== Album release (2019) ===
After more than one year of working on the album, Noah released "Wanitaku" as a single on 14 June 2019 on JOOX. The album title Keterkaitan Keterikatan and cover were announced when "Wanitaku" was released on YouTube on 28 June 2019. This was followed on 26 July 2019 by the release of the next single, "Kupeluk Hatimu".

In the run-up to its release, Noah held an album-launch concert for Keterkaitan Keterikatan on 8 August 2019 at Studio 14 MNC Studios that was broadcast on national television station RCTI. On the same day, they released "Kau Udara Bagiku" as a single and a music video for "Wanitaku". They also released "Mendekati Lugu" as a single on JOOX and YouTube Music on 10 August 2012.

Keterkaitan Keterikatan was released on compact disc format on 14 August 2019; it was sold at KFC restaurants. The album was also released on digital music services on 24 August 2019. By 12 September 2019, the physical format sold over 400,000 copies and received 4× Platinum certification from Musica Studio's.

=== Phonograph record edition (2020) ===
On 22 August 2020, Noah announced on their Instagram account they would make a vinyl LP edition of Keterkaitan Keterikatan. They then auctioned a special-edition vinyl, starting from 1 September and ending on 16 September, which is the birthday of their vocalist Ariel. The band planned to give the money received from the auction to the crew of Indonesian music industry. On 16 September, Noah held an eight-hour live stream on YouTube, during which the auction winner was announced. The winner was actor and media personality Raffi Ahmad, who bid 260 million rupiah. On the same stream, they released a music video for "Menemaniku".

=== Acoustic version (2021) ===
On 5 December 2020, Noah held a virtual concert titled NOAH Keterkaitan Keterikatan Acoustic Version in 360°, during which they played acoustic arrangements of Keterkaitan Keterikatan songs; the concert was filmed with a 360-degree camera. At the concert, the band played all eight song from the album; they also played "Dilema Besar" from Sebuah Nama, Sebuah Cerita and closed the concert with "우리의 이야기 Urieui Iyagi (Semua Tentang Kita)", a Korean version of "Semua Tentang Kita" from Taman Langit and a collaboration with Shakira Jasmine.

In 2021, Noah released the live recording of the 360-degree concert as a two-part album. The first part, which was released digital music platforms on 22 January 2021, consists of "My Situation", "Mendekati Lugu", and "Mencari Cinta"; and two other songs that were performed on the concert; "Dilema Besar" and "Semua Tentang Kita (우리의 이야기 Urieui Iyagi)". The second part was released on digital music platforms on 5 March 2021; it contains the five other songs from Keterikaitan Keterikatan.

== Reception ==
Keterkaitan Keterikatan is ranked by a collaboration between Kompas.com and Billboard Indonesia as the 16th-best Indonesian album of 2019. Writing for Kompas.com, Andika Aditia praised the album's concept and said that the two-years production is worth it. At the 23rd annual Anugerah Musik Indonesia, Keterkaitan Keterikatan won the Best of the Best Album award and was nominated for Best Pop Album.

== Track listing ==
No.	Title	Lyrics	Music	Length
1.	"Wanitaku" (My Girl)	Ariel; Pongki Barata	Ariel	4:18
2.	"Kupeluk Hatimu" (Hugging Your Heart)	Ariel; David; Ryan of D'Masiv; Noe of Letto; Marchella FP; Aan Mansyur	David	4:33
3.	"Mendekati Lugu" (Almost Innocent)	Ariel	Ariel	3:30
4.	"Mencari Cinta" (Seeking for Love) (feat. Bunga Citra Lestari)	Ariel; Mohammad Istiqamah Djamad	Lukman	4:38
5.	"Menemaniku" (Stay With Me)	David	David	3:31
6.	"Kau Udara Bagiku" (You're Like the Air to Me)	Ariel	Ariel	4:26
7.	"My Situation"	Uki; Lanlan	Ariel	4:32
8.	"Jalani Mimpi" (Living the Dream)	Lukman; Uki; Lanlan	Lukman	3:58
Total length:				33:29

Physical release bonus track
No.	Title	Lyrics	Music	Length
9.	"Moshimo Mata Itsuka" (single by Ariel of Noah feat. Ariel of Nidji)	Hiroaki Kato; Naoko Kunimoto	Ariel	4:24
Total length:				37:53

== Personnel ==
Additional musician and production personnel credits are adapted from the album's liner notes.

Noah

- Ariel – vocals
- David – keyboard
- Lukman – guitar
- Uki – guitar, engineering, mixing

Additional musician

- Bunga Citra Lestari – vocals on track 4
- Lanlan – bass guitar
- Rio – drum on track 1, 5–8
- Eca – drum on track 4

Additional personnel

- Horas Pinem - engineering
- Gita Roni – engineering
- Steve Corrao – mastering
- Capung – co-producer
- Teddy Riadi – sound supervisor

== Release history ==
Country	Date	Format	Label	Ref.
Indonesia	14 August 2019	CD	Musica Studio's	
Various	24 August 2019	Digital download	Musica Studio's	
Malaysia	13 September 2019	CD	Universal Music Malaysia	
Indonesia	16 September 2020	Phonograph record	Musica Studio's	
