= Alexandria (soundtrack) =

OST Alexandria

Soundtrack album by Peterpan
- Released: 18 September 2005
- Recorded: 2005
- Studio: Musica Studio's, Jakarta; Studionya Capung, Bandung; Level Studio, Bandung; Studio 8, Bandung
- Length: 42:32
- Label: Musica Studio's
- Producer: Capung, Icom, Noey

Peterpan chronology
Bintang di Surga (2004)	OST Alexandria (2005)	Hari yang Cerah (2007)

Singles from OST Alexandria
- 1. "Tak Bisakah"

Original Soundtrack Alexandria (commonly referred as OST Alexandria) is the third studio album by Indonesian rock band Peterpan and a soundtrack album for the 2005 film Alexandria. The album was released in 2005 under Musica Studio's label. The album is the last album Andika and Indra worked on before they were dismissed from Peterpan in October 2006.

OST Alexandria consists of five new songs and five rearrangement of older Peterpan songs. For the album, Peterpan experimented in order to create something different from their previous albums. The album's release was supported by a concert titled "Menunggu Pagi" on 18 September 2005. With at least one million album sales, the album is one of the best-selling album in Indonesia.

== Writing and production ==
For Alexandria soundtrack album, Peterpan tried to create a different sound and did some experimentation for the album's music, including in the lyrics-writing. Peterpan stated that their music exploration for the album was inspired by foreign bands, such as Sixpence None The Richer, Coldplay, and Oasis.

== Songs ==
OST Alexandria contains five new songs. Unlike Peterpan's previous albums, the songwriting for this album was not dominated by Petepan's vocalist Ariel. Out of the five new songs, only "Tak Bisakah" was completely written by Ariel. The remaining five songs are rearrangement of their old songs, namely two songs from Taman Langit: "Sahabat" and "Aku & Bintang", and three songs from Bintang di Surga, "Ku Katakan Dengan Indah", "Mungkin Nanti", and "Di Belakangku". Ariel stated during the album's release that the reason the old songs are rearranged is to dispel notion that the album is merely a compilation album.

== Release and promotion ==
The album's lead single is "Tak Bisakah". Ariel said that the song was chosen as the album's single because its lyrics fits with the film's story, it has fast music and catchy notes.

On 18 September 2005, Peterpan held a press release and concert for the album's release in Bandung, Jawa Barat. The "Menunggu Pagi" concert was started at 23.00 WIB and was aired live by six television stations.

OST Alexandria has sold over one million copies, making it one of the best-selling album in Indonesia.

== Accolades ==
The Alexandria soundtrack album won Top Band Pop Album at SCTV Music Awards 2006, and was nominated for Best Album at Anugerah Planet Muzik 2006 and for Best Indonesian Album at Anugerah Industri Muzik 2006. Peterpan also won Best Duo/Group at Anugerah Planet Muzik 2006 for this album. As Alexandria's soundtrack, "Tak Bisakah" was nominated for Best Song in Movie at MTV Indonesia Movie Awards 2006.

== Track listing ==
No.	Title	Writer(s)	Original album	Length
1.	"Tak Bisakah"	Ariel	-	3:34
2.	"Jauh Mimpiku"	Lukman; Indra; Andika; Reza	-	3:13
3.	"Membebaniku"	Ariel; Uki	-	4:23
4.	"Menunggu Pagi"	Ariel; Uki	-	5:04
5.	"Ku Katakan Dengan Indah"	Ariel	Bintang di Surga	4:53
6.	"Sahabat"	Ariel; Uki; Lukman	Taman Langit	5:08
7.	"Aku & Bintang"	Ariel	Taman Langit	3:26
8.	"Mungkin Nanti"	Ariel	Bintang di Surga	5:25
9.	"Di Belakangku"	Ariel	Bintang di Surga	3:32
10.	"Langit Tak Mendengar"	Ariel; Lukman	-	3:51
Total length:				42:32

== Personnel ==
Credits for additional personnel are adapted from the album's liner notes.

Peterpan

- Ariel – vocals
- Andika – keyboard
- Indra – bass guitar
- Lukman – guitar
- Reza – drum
- Uki – guitar

Additional personnel

- Adi – engineering (music)
- Heri Amr – engineering (music)
- Tonny Hawaii – engineering (music and vocals)
- Capung – engineering (vocals)
- Redjoy – engineering (vocals and string), backing vocals, and backing vocals arrangement
- Icom – engineering (string), backing vocals arrangement, and drum loop on track 6
- Chris – engineering (string)
- Andry Mandera – mixing and mastering
- Job Rusli – string arrangement on track 2
- I Nyoman Mahendra – violin 1
- Yoyo – violin 1
- Sunarya – violin 1
- Josephine Kwan – violin 1
- Fitrah Ramadhan – violin 2
- Raga Dipananegara – violin 2
- Angga Aditia – alto violin
- Ahmad Reza – alto violin
- Robby Subarja – cello
- Ajeng – backing vocals
- Abel – backing vocals
