= List of best-selling albums in Indonesia =

Best-selling albums of all-time in Indonesia

These are the top 20 best-selling albums in Indonesia by Indonesian artists, according to physical sales.

Rank	Year	Artist	Album	Sales	Sources
1	1990	Nike Ardilla	Bintang Kehidupan	6,000,000	
2	1995	Nike Ardilla	Sandiwara Cinta	5,000,000	
3	2011	Rossa	The Best of Rossa	5,000,000	
4	2004	Peterpan	Bintang di Surga	3,200,000	
5	2004	Rossa	Kembali	2,900,000	
6	2012	Noah	Seperti Seharusnya	2,000,000	
7	2001	Padi	Sesuatu Yang Tetunda	2,000,000	
9	2010	Indah Dewi Pertiwi	Hipnotis	2,000,000	
10	2000	Dewa 19	Bintang Lima	1,800,000	
11	2000	Jamrud	Ningrat	1,800,000	
12	2000	Sheila on 7	Kisah Klasik Untuk Masa Depan	1,700,000	
13	2009	Rossa	Rossa (Self-Titled)	1,500,000	
14	2014	Rossa	Love, Life & Music	1,400,000	
15	2002	Jamrud	Sydney 090102	1,400,000	
16	2004	Radja	Langkah Baru	1,300,000	
17	2002	Sheila on 7	07 Des	1,300,000	
18	1999	Sheila on 7	Sheila on 7	1,300,000	
19	2005	Peterpan	OST Alexandria	1,300,000	
20	2011	Agnes Monica	Agnes Is My Name	1,000,000	

These are the top best-selling albums in Indonesia by international artists.

Rank	Year	Artist	Album	Sales	Sources
1	1999	Westlife	Westlife	1,000,000	
2	1998	Soundtrack	Kuch Kuch Hota Hai	800,000	
3	1991	Michael Jackson	Dangerous	500,000	
4	1992	Soundtrack	The Bodyguard	320,000	
5	1993	UB40	Promises and Lies	250,000	

== See also ==
- List of Indonesian musicians and musical groups
