= Loekman Hakim =

Indonesian musician (born 1975)

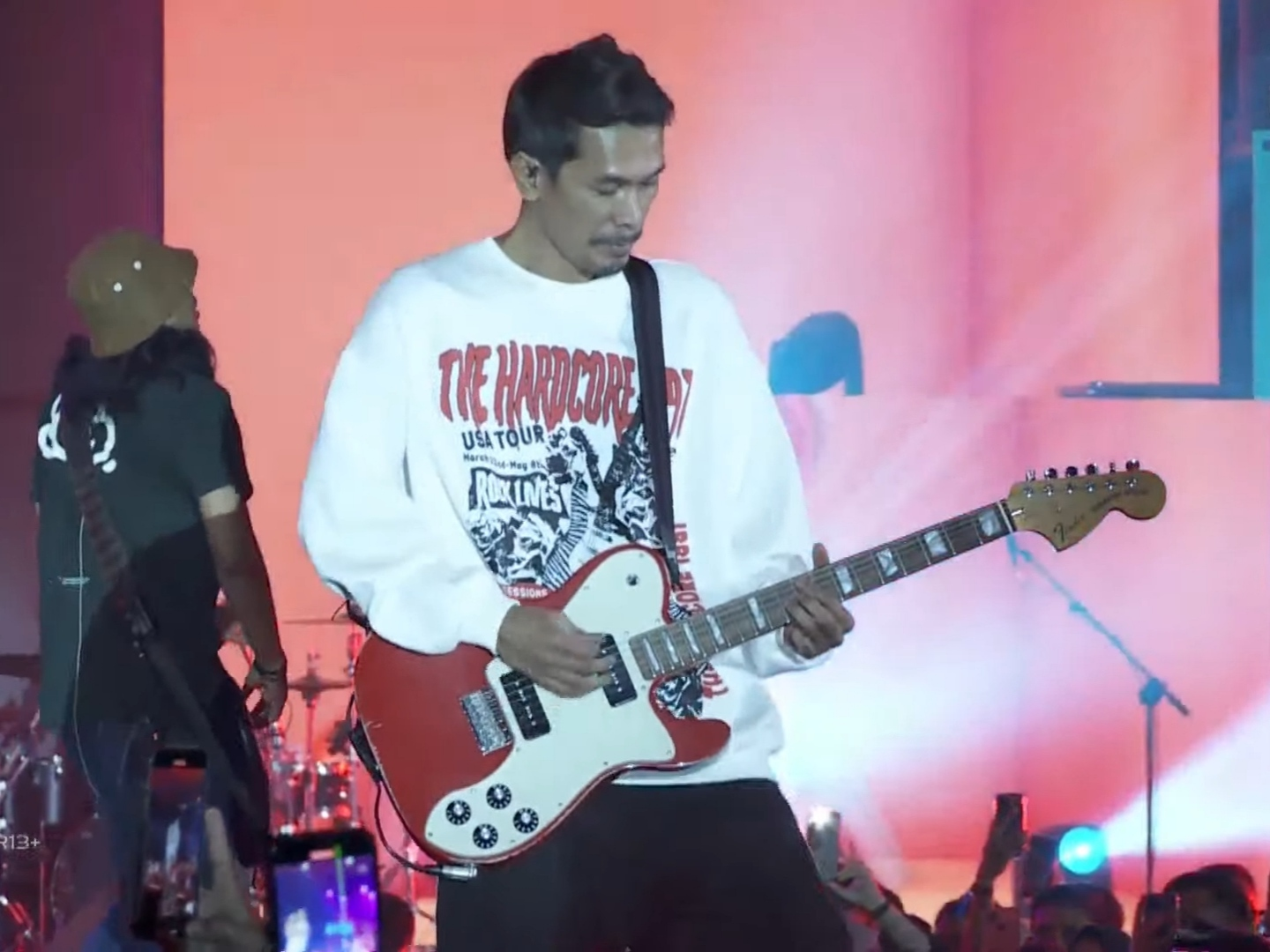
- Loekman performing with Noah in 2022
- Born: December 30, 1975 (age 50); Cianjur, West Java, Indonesia
- Other name: Loekman Noah
- Occupation: Musician
- Years active: 1991–present
- Website: www.noah-site.com

Lukman or Loekman Hakim (born December 30, 1975), often known by his stage name Loekman Noah, is a guitarist for the Indonesian rock band Noah.

== Career ==
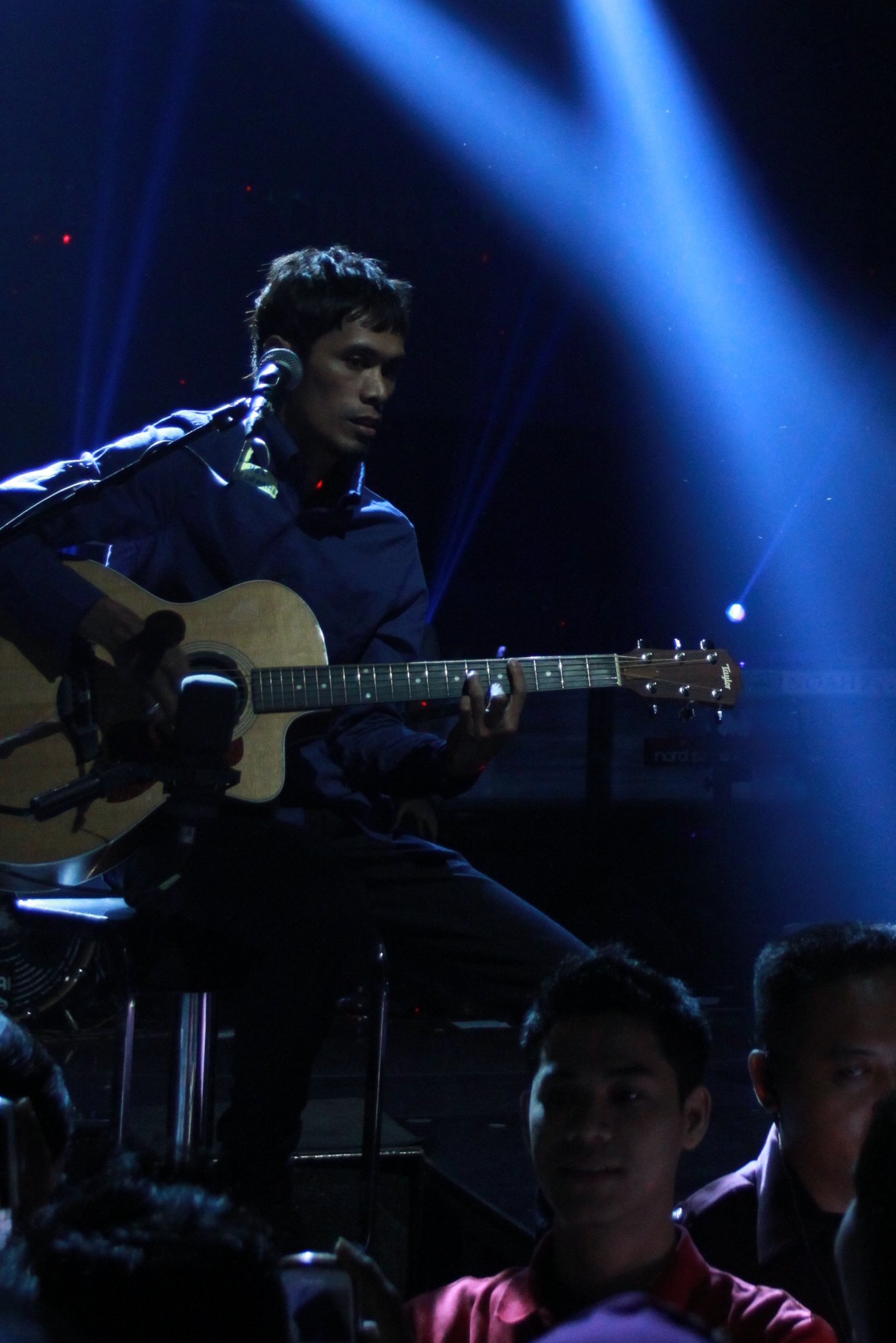
Loekman performing with Noah in 2013

Loekman joined Peterpan in 2000. At that time, the band had three members: Ariel, Uki, and Reza. Together with Peterpan, Loekman released six albums: Taman Langit, Bintang di Surga, Ost. Alexandria, Hari Yang Cerah, Sebuah Nama Sebuah Cerita and an instrumental album, Suara Lainnya. Peterpan was renamed Noah in August 2012 and continues to release new albums.

During his career as a guitarist in this band, Loekman earned a nomination for Most Famous Guitarist Player in the 2013 SCTV Music Awards.

== Personal life ==
Loekman Hakim was born in Cianjur, West Java, Indonesia, on December 30, 1975, to Eman Sulaeman and Iis Martini. Loekman is the third child of five siblings. His father was a teacher at SMP 5 Bandung. Loekman married Rika Nurhayati and they have two children.

== Filmography ==
=== Film ===
Year	Title	Role
2013	Noah: Awal Semula	Loekman

== Book ==
- Kisah Lainnya (2012)
- 6.903 mil – Cerita di Balik Konser 2 Benua 5 Negara (2013)

== Awards and nominations ==
Year	Award	Category	Result
2013	SCTV Music Awards	Most Famous Guitar Player	Nominated
