= Sebuah Nama, Sebuah Cerita =

Compilation album by Peterpan
- Released: 2008
- Recorded: 2002–2008
- Genre: Alternative rock, pop, rock
- Label: Musica Studios

Peterpan chronology
| Hari yang Cerah... (2007) | Sebuah Nama, Sebuah Cerita (2008) | Suara Lainnya (2012) |

Sebuah Nama, Sebuah Cerita (One Name, One Story) is the only compilation album and final album released by Peterpan. The album was released in 2008. First single from this album is "Walau Habis Terang" (English translation: "Though Light's Gone Out"). The album released in two version, cassette version and CD version. CD version contains 30 songs (3 new songs, a new-arrangement Chrisye's song and 26 hits songs from previous album). Meanwhile, cassette version just contains 21 songs (3 new songs, a new-arrangement Chrisye's song and 17 hits songs from previous album). This album has sold over 550.000 copies in indonesia.

== Background ==
After Andika and Indra split from Peterpan, they asked the remaining band members to change their band name. Since according to their agreement Andika and Indra have right to the name, the others agree to change the Peterpan name. For their last album with Peterpan name, they decided to make a "best of the best" album, so Peterpan's last album will be composed of their best songs. Peterpan also recorded new songs for this album as, according to their vocalist Ariel, they wanted to make the album as special as possible.

== Songs ==
Sebuah Nama, Sebuah Cerita is a double album consisting of 30 songs in the CD version and 21 songs in the cassette version. Among those songs are four new recordings: "Walau Habis Terang", "Kisah Cintaku", "Dilema Besar", and "Tak Ada yang Abadi". "Kisah Cintaku" is a song by Indonesian singer Chrisye from his 1988 album Jumpa Pertama. Peterpan's guitarist Uki said that Peterpan covered the song as a tribute to Chrisye for his influence on Peterpan's development. "Tak Ada yang Abadi" according to Ariel is a song that fits Peterpan's feelings as they are changing their name.

== Release ==
Peterpan released Sebuah Nama, Sebuah Cerita in XXI Lounge Jakarta Theater, Central Jakarta on 8 August 2008. The album sold over 580 thousand copies.

== Track listing ==
CD version Disc one
| No. | Title | Writer(s) | Original release | Length |
|---|---|---|---|---|
| 1. | "Walau Habis Terang" (Though Light's Gone Out) | Ariel | New song | 3:37 |
| 2. | "Kisah Cintaku" (My Love Story) | Tito Soemarsono | New song | 4:32 |
| 3. | "Dilema Besar" (Big Dilemma) | Ariel; Lukman | New song | 4:11 |
| 4. | "Mungkin Nanti" (Maybe Later) | Ariel | Bintang di Surga (2004) | 3:22 |
| 5. | "Tak Bisakah" (Can't You) | Ariel | OST. Alexandria (2005) | 3:01 |
| 6. | "Semua Tentang Kita" (All About Us) | Ariel | Taman Langit (2003) | 4:27 |
| 7. | "Ada Apa Denganmu" (What's Wrong With You) | Ariel | Bintang di Surga (2004) | 4:42 |
| 8. | "Menunggumu" (Waiting for You, feat. Chrisye) | Ariel | Senyawa (2004) | 3:45 |
| 9. | "Menghapus Jejakmu" (Erasing Your Footsteps) | Ariel; Eross Candra | Hari yang Cerah... (2007) | 3:06 |
| 10. | "Yang Terdalam" (The Deepest) | Ariel | Taman Langit (2003) | 3:19 |
| 11. | "Diatas Normal" (Above Normal) | Ariel | Bintang di Surga (2004) | 3:37 |
| 12. | "Kupu-Kupu Malam" (Midnight Butterfly) | Titiek Puspa | From Us to U (2005) | 3:44 |
| 13. | "Di Balik Awan" (Behind the Clouds) | Ariel | Hari yang Cerah... (2007) | 3:55 |
| 14. | "Ku Katakan Dengan Indah" (I Say It Beautifully) | Ariel | Bintang di Surga (2004) | 5:36 |
| 15. | "Tak Ada Yang Abadi" (Nothing Lasts Forever) | Ariel | New song | 4:15 |
| Total length: | | | | 60:52 |

Disc two
| No. | Title | Writer(s) | Album asal | Length |
|---|---|---|---|---|
| 16. | "Mimpi yang Sempurna" (A Perfect Dream) | Ariel | Kisah 2002 Malam (2002) | 3:38 |
| 17. | "Bintang di Surga" (Stars in Heaven) | Ariel | Bintang di Surga (2004) | 5:02 |
| 18. | "Aku & Bintang" (I & the Stars) | Ariel | Taman Langit (2003) | 3:39 |
| 19. | "Jauh Mimpiku" (My Distant Dreams) | Lukman; Indra; Andika; Reza | OST. Alexandria (2005) | 3:16 |
| 20. | "Hari yang Cerah Untuk Jiwa yang Sepi" (A Bright Day for a Lonely Soul) | Ariel; Lukman | Hari yang Cerah... (2007) | 4:00 |
| 21. | "Menunggu Pagi" (Waiting for Dawn) | Ariel; Uki | OST. Alexandria (2005) | 3:46 |
| 22. | "Khayalan Tingkat Tinggi" (High-Level Imagination) | Ariel | Bintang di Surga (2004) | 3:25 |
| 23. | "Sahabat" (Best Friend) | Ariel; Uki; Lukman | Taman Langit (2003) | 4:34 |
| 24. | "Sally Sendiri" (Sally is Alone) | Ariel | Hari yang Cerah... (2007) | 4:18 |
| 25. | "Langit Tak Mendengar" (The Sky Doesn't Listen) | Ariel; Lukman | OST. Alexandria (2005) | 3:53 |
| 26. | "Di Belakangku" (Behind Me) | Ariel | Bintang di Surga (2004) | 5:04 |
| 27. | "Kita Tertawa" (We Laugh) | Ariel; Lukman | Taman Langit (2003) | 3:30 |
| 28. | "Membebaniku" (Burdening Me) | Ariel; Uki | OST. Alexandria (2005) | 4:25 |
| 29. | "Cobalah Mengerti" (Try to Understand) | Ariel; Lukman | Hari yang Cerah... (2007) | 4:28 |
| 30. | "Topeng" (Mask) | Ariel | Taman Langit (2003) | 4:26 |
| Total length: | | | | 61:24 |
