= Noah (band) =

Indonesian alternative pop/rock band

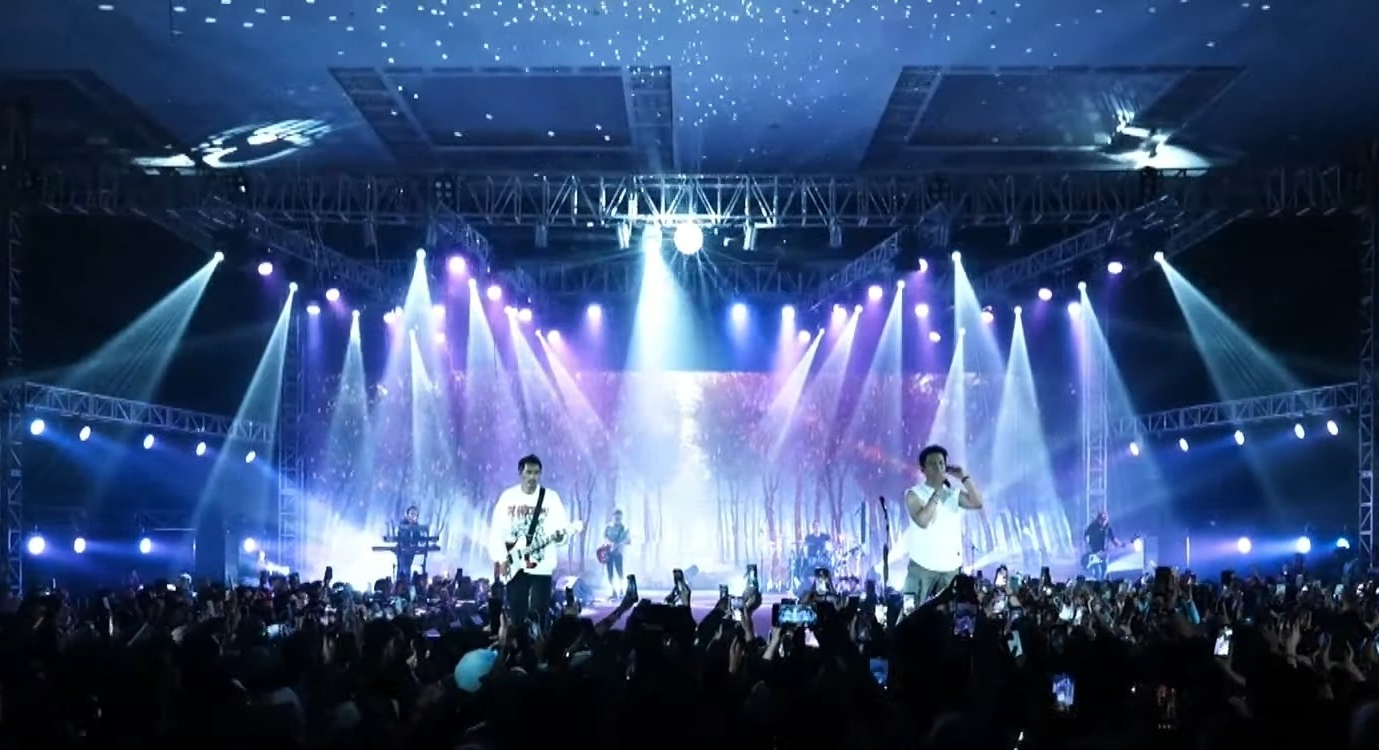
- The band performs in Makassar on 25 November 2022. From left: David, Lukman, Iwan, Rio, Ariel, Lanlan

Background information
- Also known as: Peterpan (2000–2012)
- Origin: Bandung, West Java, Indonesia
- Genres: Rock; pop; alternative rock; pop rock; space rock; grunge (early); Britpop (early)
- Years active: 2000–2024 (Note: On hiatus.)
- Label: Musica Studios
- Past members: Andika Naliputra (Andika); Nazril Irham (Ariel); Hendra Suhendra (Indra); Ilsyah Ryan Reza (Reza); Mohammad Kautsar Hikmat (Uki); Loekman Hakim (Lukman); David Kurnia Albert (David)
- Website: noah.musica.id

Noah (formerly known as Peterpan; and later stylized as NOAH) are an Indonesian rock band formed as Peterpan in Bandung, West Java in 2000, which consisted of six members: Ariel, Andika, Indra, Lukman, Reza and Uki, with Andika as the leader. Most of their lyrics are written by Ariel, who is the band's lead vocalist. The band currently consists of three members: Ariel, Lukman, and David; and is currently on hiatus since New Year 2024.

Starting their career by playing in cafés, Peterpan gained popularity in 2002 after recording "Mimpi yang Sempurna" for a compilation album Kisah 2002 Malam, followed by a debut album Taman Langit in 2003 that was an enormous hit in the country. They gained further popularity in 2004 with their second album Bintang di Surga, which sold over three million copies and won Best of the Best Album in Indonesian Music Awards (AMI) among other awards. A soundtrack album for the film Alexandria released in 2005, also sold over a million copies. Peterpan has won various awards including two MTV Asia Awards for Favorite Artist Indonesia and Best Contribution Award at the 2007 Asia Song Festival. After keyboardist Andika and bassist, Indra split from the band in 2006 keyboardist David joined in 2006, and later became a permanent member after 2 years. Their third and last studio album as Peterpan Hari yang Cerah launched in 2007 continued the band's success. After that, the band agreed to change their name in 2009.

The announcement of a new name was planned in 2010, but it was delayed because vocalist Ariel was arrested that year. After Ariel was released in 2012, the new name, Noah, was announced. Noah regained their popularity in 2012 with their first album, Seperti Seharusnya, which gained huge success by selling over a million copies in Indonesia and winning their second AMI Award for Best of the Best Album. Drummer Reza split from the band in 2015, around the same time Noah released their second album, Second Chance, where they collaborated with Steve Lillywhite. Rhythm guitarist Uki also split from the band in 2019 after the release of Keterkaitan Keterikatan album which won another AMI Award for Best of the Best Album.

As of 2020, Noah has sold more than 9 million albums in Indonesia and is recognized as the best selling alternative pop/rock band in the country. They are regarded as one of the most successful bands in the history of Indonesia's popular music. Three of their albums are included on the list of Indonesian all time best selling albums at #4 for Bintang di Surga, #5 for Seperti Seharusnya, and #15 for OST Alexandria.

== History ==
=== 1997–2000: Formation and early years ===
In 1997, keyboardist Andika formed a school band in Bandung, Indonesia that was called Topi, with Abel as bassist, Ari as drummer, and Lukman as guitarist who joined the band after being invited by Abel. Lukman later asked his friend and a high-school student, Ariel, to be the vocalist since he was interested with Ariel's voice. Ariel then proposed his friend Uki as guitarist and Lukman approved it. Topi played in cafés — starting in the B Club café as their first appearance — birthday parties, independence day celebrations, and art festivals. Uki, Ariel, and Lukman decided to leave the band after seeing no vision for the band and Topi disbanded soon after.

While taking an academic break after graduating from high school, Ariel is requested to join Andika's new band, reuniting with Uki and Ari as well as meeting new additions of Indra (bass) and Nendy (guitar). The band was later named Universe and performed in O'Hara café. Lukman later replaced Nendy due to his mismatch with the band and Reza, Indra's bandmate in Second Act, took Ari's position because he was considered to be unable to follow the band's performance.

=== 2000–2009: Peterpan ===
==== 2000–2002: Topi's reunion, Kisah 2002 Malam, and Taman Langit ====
Andika regrouped former members of Topi in 2000, the drummer was replaced by Ilsyah Ryan Reza, a college student from Palu. Loekman Hakim, a friend of Indra's elder brother, joined as their lead guitarist. Andika Naliputra Wirahardja suggested Peterpan as the name for the band referring to Peter Pan, the character created by J. M. Barrie, an author (other names they considered were Spiderman and X-Men). But according to Ariel, the name was taken from the name of a rabbit satay stall at the side road in Puncak, Bogor, that Andika and his mom visited while taking a rest on the trip to Bandung from Jakarta. The band was formally founded on September 1, 2000. Peterpan played on Bandung streets and gigged in cafés, with the goal of becoming a house band in one of the city's cafés. They often covered alternative rock and rock songs, (Nirvana, Pearl Jam, Coldplay, U2, Creed, Lifehouse, The Calling etc.) at O'Hara and Sapu Lidi cafés.

While Peterpan performed as a Caffeine's opening act at Sapu Lidi, Noey, Java Jive's bassist, Caffeine's manager, and producer who planned to release a compilation album that was later known as Kisah 2002 Malam, spotted the band and asked them to fill a Musica Studio's album compilation as a replacement for a band that left the project. Peterpan recorded three demo songs: "Sahabat", "Mimpi yang Sempurna", and "Taman Langit". "Mimpi yang Sempurna" was chosen for the album. The album was commercially successful, selling a respectable 150,000 copies, and "Mimpi yang Sempurna" was given heavy rotation on Indonesian radio.

Peterpan later toured to several cities like Malang and Makassar as a part of Kisah 2002 Malam's promotion, that made their first appearances outside of Bandung. While on tour, Peterpan covered several bands' songs such as Red Hot Chili Peppers and Radiohead, where their debut single, "Mimpi yang Sempurna", was performed as an encore. On 15 December 2002, Peterpan made their television debut in Trans TV's first anniversary, "Setahun Melangkah Trans TV".

Musica Studio's offered Peterpan a contract and released their debut studio album, Taman Langit, in June 2003. By releasing mega-hits such as "Sahabat", "Mimpi Yang Sempurna" on a piano version, "Aku dan Bintang", "Semua Tentang Kita", "Topeng", and "Yang Terdalam", their debut studio album instantly become hugely popular around the country and made them superstars. The album has sold over 650,000 copies making Peterpan reach a Multi-Platinum Award.

==== 2004–2005: Bintang di Surga and OST Alexandria ====
Following their debut album's commercial success, Peterpan held concerts in six cities in Indonesia in only 24 hours on July 18, 2004. The six-cities concerts were also part of promotion for their second album. The concerts were titled "Konser Breaking Record" and included concerts on two Indonesian major islands: Sumatra and Java. The concerts started in Medan, then Padang, Pekanbaru, Lampung, Semarang, and finally ended at Surabaya. Peterpan then received an award from Indonesian World Records Museum (MURI) for breaking a record, by being the first band to hold concerts in six provinces in a day.

In 2004, by releasing a number of monster hits such as "Ada Apa Denganmu", "Mungkin Nanti", "Kukatakan Dengan Indah", "Bintang di Surga", "Di Atas Normal", and "Khayalan Tingkat Tinggi", their second studio album Bintang Di Surga was released in August 2004 and quickly became the biggest phenomenon in the 2000s, not only in Indonesia, but also in the neighborhood countries such as Singapore, Brunei, and Malaysia, where in the latter country that album was awarded 6× platinum. Selling over 350,000 copies in two weeks, by the end of 2005, it had sold a remarkable 2.7 million and to date had sold over 3.2 million copies in Indonesia. This album became the third best-selling album of all time in Indonesia and Rolling Stone Indonesia magazine ranked album #116 on "The 150 Greatest Indonesian Albums of All Time" list. A song from this album, "Kukatakan Dengan Indah", got a place at #140 on Rolling Stone Indonesia's "150 Greatest Indonesian Songs of All Time" list. Also in 2004, Peterpan collaborated with Indonesian pop singer, Chrisye, in Chrisye's album Senyawa, specifically on the song "Menunggumu" which was written by Ariel.

The greater commercial success of Bintang Di Surga had led Peterpan to receive recognition and won many awards in early 2005, where Peterpan won an award as Indonesia's favorite artist at MTV Asia Aid in Bangkok. At the Indonesian Music Awards (AMI) 2005, Peterpan ranked top in the nominations by obtaining 11 nominations. Four of them were printed through the song "Ada Apa Denganmu". Of the 11 nominations, Peterpan won 7 awards, including "best music group", "best album", "best graphic design album" and "best production work", due to the album Bintang Di Surga. At the SCTV Music Awards 2005, Peterpan was honored in the "Top Pop Group Albums" and "Most Popular Songs". In February 2005, Peterpan planned to release a video album, later titled Untuk Sahabat Peterpan which contains karaoke's music video and the 6 cities on 24 hours' breaking record concert's documentation, the video album was released a month after.

In September 2005, Peterpan released a soundtrack for the Rexinema movie, Alexandria. The album's release concert was aired simultaneously by six national TV stations, live in their hometown, Bandung, at the Dago Plaza. The soundtrack album included five new songs and renditions of five of their songs from Taman Langit and Bintang di Surga. The song "Tak Bisakah" was able to reap the controversy due to being copied by Indian musicians for the film Woh Lamhe Woh Lamhe with the title song "Kya Mujhe Pyaar". This album succeeded, sold over 1.3 million copies and was recognized as the best-selling soundtrack album of all time in Indonesia (#15 on the list of best-selling albums in that country). At the 2006 Anugerah Planet Muzik which is an annual award given to the most popular artists from Indonesia, Singapore, Brunei, and Malaysia Peterpan won two awards as the "Best Duo/Group" for song "Tak Bisakah" and "Most Popular Group Artist". Peterpan also won their second award as Indonesia's favorite artist at MTV Asia Aid.

==== 2006–2009: Andika's and Indra's departures, Hari yang Cerah, and Sebuah Nama, Sebuah Cerita ====
In November 2006, Andika and Indra split with the rest of the band, with both sides citing musical differences and lacking contributions from both of them leading to dismissal. According to Ariel, there were problems since the making of their first album. Indra had also just lost his child. Following Andika and Indra's dismissal, Andika's mother was disinclined if the remaining members were still known as Peterpan and Andika set the plan to threaten the band if Peterpan's name didn't retire. Andika and Indra later formed a new band named The Titans, and signed with international label EMI Music Indonesia, releasing a self-titled album and a single, "Rasa Ini".

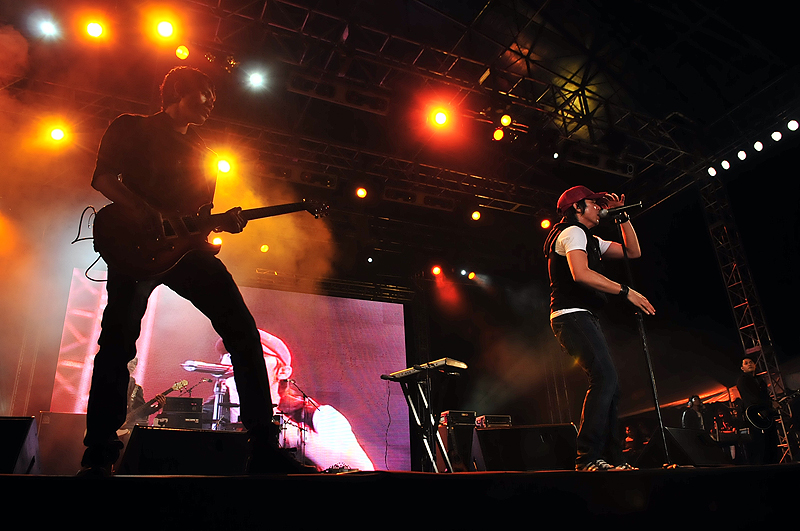
Peterpan performing in Kuala Lumpur, Malaysia, in 2008

In 2007, the remaining members of Peterpan released their third studio album, Hari Yang Cerah. This album produced other popular hits like "Menghapus Jejakmu", "Di Balik Awan", "Hari Yang Cerah Untuk Jiwa Yang Sepi", "Sally Sendiri", and "Cobalah Mengerti". The band also held an album's release concert which also aired simultaneously by six national TV stations, also live in Bandung, but at Gasibu this time. In 2018, the single "Menghapus Jejakmu" became the subject of public discussion after there was an element of similarity in the new song released by Korean Boyband iKon "Love Scenario". Although they have similarities, the meanings of the two songs are different.

In September 2007, they took part in the Asia "Song Festival" in South Korea as representatives from Indonesia.

The agreement under which Andika and Indra left the band allowed the remaining members to continue using the name Peterpan through the end of 2008. In early 2008, the band announced that they would be changing their name, stating that their 2008 compilation album, Sebuah Nama Sebuah Cerita, would be their last under the name Peterpan. The album mostly consists of popular hits from the band's history, with four new songs: "Walau Habis Terang", "Kisah Cintaku" (a cover of Chrisye's song), "Dilema Besar", and "Tak Ada Yang Abadi". In the same year, David Kurnia Albert joined Peterpan as a permanent member after replacing Andika as an additional keyboardist a year later.

=== 2009–2012: Unnamed band and instrumental album Suara Lainnya ===
After retiring the Peterpan name, Ariel, Uki, Lukman, Reza and David continued to play without a band name, using their names as a placeholder. Ariel said that they were planning to announce their new band name in 2010, when they have finished their next album. But this plan was delayed because Ariel was arrested in 2010 for a sex tape scandal.

During Ariel's time in prison, the band worked on an album containing instrumental arrangements of Peterpan songs. Even though the album was instrumental, the vocalist Ariel was still involved by giving the band ideas any time his bandmates visited him in prison. The album, titled Suara Lainnya, was released on 23 May 2012, credited under the name "Ariel, Uki, Lukman, Reza, David". The album's release was supported by a concert, titled "Konser Tanpa Nama", held by Uki, Lukman, Reza and David on 29 May 2012. The instrumental concert was said to be the first of its kind in Indonesia.

=== 2012–2023: Noah ===
==== 2012–2013: Renaming as Noah, Seperti Seharusnya and resurgence of popularity ====
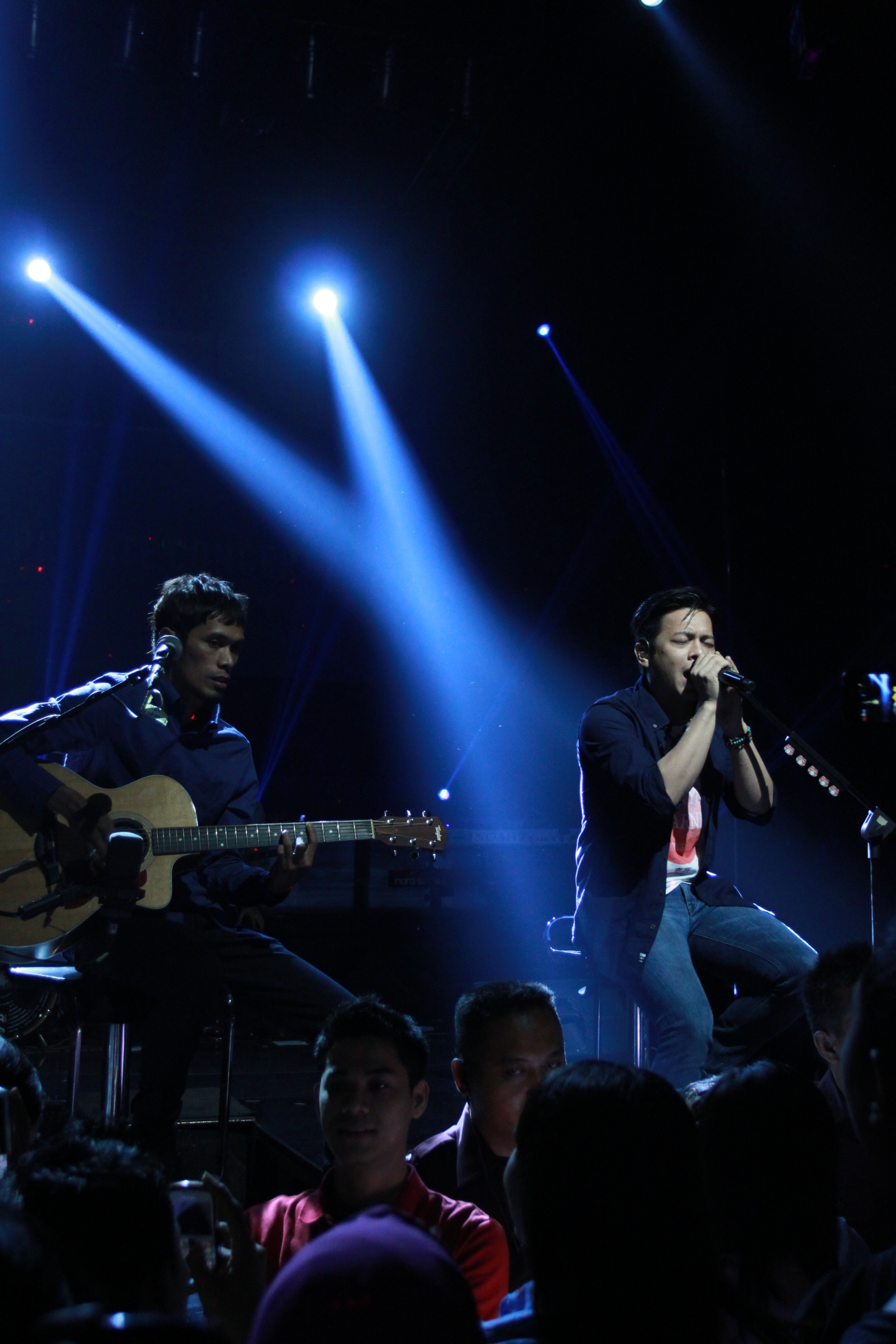
Noah performing in Yogyakarta, Indonesia, in 2013

After Ariel was released early on July 23, 2012, Ariel, Uki, Lukman, Reza and David announced their new name, Noah, on August 2, 2012. According to the band, they were not specifically referencing the prophet Noah. Ariel stated that he simply thought the name was simple and fit with their music. Then on August 3, 2012, the band released their first single under then Noah name, "Separuh Aku", via simultaneous airplay on 200 radios at 15.08 WIB, refers to release date. On August 9, 2012, Noah released a book titled Kisah Lainnya.

On 15–16 September 2012, Noah held a concert in five countries in 24-hour span in Melbourne, Hong Kong, Kuala Lumpur, Singapore, and Jakarta. With this concert, Noah broke another Indonesian World Records Museum (MURI) record, after previously breaking a MURI record in 2004. Their first album under the Noah name, Seperti Seharusnya, was released on the same day. The album was sold through KFC outlets and has sold over 200 thousand copies in three days since its release. By February 2013, the album has sold over one million copies and Noah received a Multi-Platinum Award. With over a million sales, Seperti Seharusnya was one of the best-selling albums in Indonesia.

By the commercial success of their album Seperti Seharusnya, Noah won many awards. In the 2013 Indonesian Music Award (AMI), Noah ranked top in the nominations by obtaining 10 nominations. Four of them were printed through the song "Separuh Aku". Of the 10 nominations, Noah won 6 awards, including "Best Pop Duo/Group", "Best Pop/Urban Recording Producer", "Best of the Best Production Work" for the single Separuh Aku, and "Best Pop/Urban Album", "Best of the Best Album" for album Seperti Seharusnya. At the Anugerah Planet Muzik which is an annual award given to the most popular artists from Indonesia, Singapore, and Malaysia. Noah won the award "Best Band" twice in the second consecutive year (2013 and 2014) for both songs "Separuh Aku" and "Tak Lagi Sama", and "APM Most Popular Artist" in 2014. Noah also won The Nickelodeon Indonesia Kids' Choice Awards in 2013 as "Favorite Band".

==== 2014–2016: Second Chance, Reza's departure and Sings Legends ====
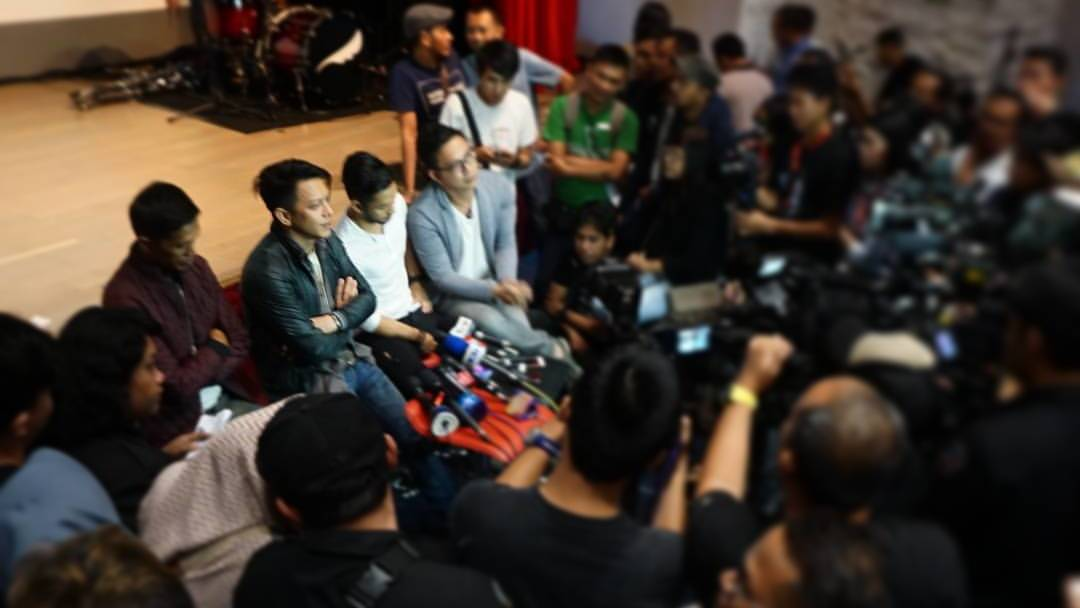
Noah in Jakarta, Indonesia, in 2016

In June 2014, Noah announced that they were making new songs and a new album and that they were working with an English producer, Steve Lillywhite, to produce them. The collaboration resulted in Noah's first English-language song, "Hero", which was released as a single via airplay in 170 radios on August 6, 2014, and in iTunes on August 7, 2014.

In December 2014, Reza announced that he was going to leave the band after one last show on New Year's Eve. By January 1, 2015, Reza was officially no longer part of the band. Also on December 31, Noah released their new album, Second Chance, which contains three new songs including "Hero" and nine rearrangements of Peterpan's song.

In March 2015, Noah announced that they were planning to hold a tour in United States in April 2015, specifically in four cities: San Francisco, Los Angeles, New York, and Washington DC. The tour was delayed because Ariel was not fit among other unstated reasons. The tour ended up being held in October 2015 in three cities: Los Angeles, Washington DC, and New York.

On May 19, 2016, Noah released an album titled Sings Legends. The album consists of rearrangements of eight Indonesian songs that Noah considered legendary.

==== 2017–2020: Keterkaitan Keterikatan and Uki's departure ====
After releasing and promoting Sings Legends, Noah began working on a new album, the first since Seperti Seharusnya that fully consisted of new songs. At first, the album was planned to be released in 2017. On September 16, 2017, Noah released two songs, "Jalani Mimpi" and "My Situation", as a single. (Note: On JOOX and Spotify, "Jalani Mimpi" and "My Situation" are released as a single, titled "New Singles". While on iTunes, they are released as separate singles.) On the night of the same day, Noah held a concert titled Road to New Album, where they played those two songs. They also told the audience that they had only finished those two songs and were not close to finishing the album yet. In July 2018, Ariel said that they had almost finished the music for the album's songs, but the lyrics were not halfway done. Because the process was taking longer than usual, Noah got help from Java Jive guitarist, Capung, who previously had produced Peterpan's album. Noah also collaborated with other singers and writers to write the lyrics.

On June 14, 2019, Noah released "Wanitaku", a song that they had partially revealed in 2017, as a JOOX-exclusive single. Then on June 28, "Wanitaku" was released on other digital music services. Audio video for "Wanitaku" that Noah uploaded to YouTube revealed the album title, Keterkaitan Keterikatan, as well as its cover. On August 8, 2019, Noah held an album-launching concert for Keterkaitan Keterikatan. On the same day, Noah's guitarist Uki announced his resignation from the band via an Instagram post.

At a press conference on 14 August 2019, Noah announced the compact disk release of Keterkaitan Keterikatan via KFC restaurant chain. The album was subsequently released in digital music services on 28 August 2019. As of 12 September 2019, the physical format has sold over 400,000 copies and received 4× Platinum certification from Musica Studio's. At the 23rd Anugerah Musik Indonesia, the album won another Best of the Best Album award for Noah.

==== 2021–2023: Continuation of Second Chance ====
On 12 December 2021, Noah announced that they will release Second Chance: Taman Langit, a re-recording of their 2003 album Taman Langit, and perform in a series of concerts in 2022. Noah's version of Taman Langit, along with a remake of "Yang Terdalam" music video, was released on 17 December 2021. Noah then continued by releasing a re-recorded version of "Bintang di Surga" as a single on 7 January 2022. Noah's version of their 2004 album Bintang di Surga was released afterwards on 12 January 2022. Lastly, Noah released the new version of "Menghapus Jejakmu" as a single with a music video on 21 January 2022, and the new version of Hari yang Cerah on 26 January 2022.

On 1 January 2024, the band announced that they went on hiatus until "undisclosed future".

== Community ==
Now, NOAH's fanbase has expanded up to 60 communities in Indonesia, and also including Malaysia, Singapore, Hongkong and Taiwan, mainly known as 'Sahabat NOAH'.

== Case and controversy ==
=== Riots at concerts ===
Like many other popular musicians in Indonesia, Noah's concerts have experienced problems. On February 22, 2006, at Harapan Bangsa Lhongraya Stadium, at least 30 spectators fainted, most being young women. The concert was also said to have violated Shariah law in Aceh because of the mixing of male and female spectators in the show field.

The riots at concerts not only affected the spectators but also members of the group performing. An example of this occurred on April 11, 2006, during a Peterpan concert in Bima Stadium, Cirebon, when rocks were thrown by the spectators who had no tickets outside of the stadium. This event caused harm to dozens of the spectators inside the stadium which prompted many of them to rush to various hospitals due to being hit by the falling stones, as well as the vocalist, Ariel, who was struck in the chest before he was secured to the outside of the stadium. As a result of the incident, the concert was stopped when the band was performing their fifth song of the night, "Mungkin Nanti", at around 20:30 WIB.

=== Sex tape scandal ===
In 2010, Ariel was arrested for violating Indonesian anti-pornography laws, when videos which appeared to be himself having sexual intercourse circulated on the internet, after his laptop was reportedly stolen.

In January 2011, Bandung's District Court sentenced Ariel to three and a half years imprisonment after testimonies by digital forensic experts confirmed that Ariel was the male counterpart in the sex tape scandal, involving Luna Maya and Cut Tari, and that he was responsible for the creation of the videos. In April, an appeal to the High Court was rejected, with judges deciding unanimously to uphold the sentence given by the District Court. On 23 July 2012, after serving two years in prison, Ariel was released early for good behavior.

== Band members ==
- Nazril "Ariel" Irham – lead vocals, guitar, tambourine, piano (2000–2023)
- Loekman Hakim – guitar, backing vocals (2000–2023)
- David Kurnia Albert – keyboards, piano, synthesizer, backing vocals (2008–2023)

Past members

- Andika Naliputra Wirahardja – keyboards, piano, backing vocals (2000–2006)
- Hendra "Indra" Suhendra – bass, backing vocals (2000–2006)
- Ilsyah Ryan Reza – drums (2000–2015)
- Mohammad Kautsar "Uki" Hikmat – guitar, backing vocals (2000–2019)

Session & touring musicians

- Rio Alief – drums, percussion (2015–)
- Muhammad Dwi Maulana – bass, backing vocals (2015–)
- Muhammad Iqbal Maruli - drums (2016–; substitute drummer for Alief)
- Iwan Sukma – guitar, backing vocals (2019–)
- Yosafat Luki Marendra – bass (2006–2009)
- Ihsan Nurrahman – bass, backing vocals (2009–2013)
- Boyi Tondo – bass, backing vocals (2013–2015)

== Discography ==
=== Albums ===
==== Studio albums ====
List of studio albums with selected details, sales, and certification
Title	Album details	Sales	Certifications
Credited as Peterpan
Taman Langit	Released: June 3, 2003; Label: Musica Studios; Formats: CD, cassette, digital download	IDN: 850,000+	ASIRI: 5× Platinum
Bintang di Surga	Released: July 26, 2004; Label: Musica Studios; Formats: CD, cassette, digital download	IDN: 3,200,000+; MYS: 120,000+	ASIRI: 21× Platinum; RIM: 6× Platinum
Hari Yang Cerah	Released: May 25, 2007; Label: Musica Studios; Formats: CD, cassette, digital download	IDN: 900,000+	ASIRI: 6× Platinum
Credited as Noah
Seperti Seharusnya	Released: September 16, 2012; Label: Musica Studios; Formats: CD, digital download	IDN: 1,900,000	ASIRI: Platinum
Keterkaitan Keterikatan	Released: August 14, 2019; Label: Musica Studios; Formats: CD, digital download	IDN: 500,000+	

==== Soundtrack albums ====
List of soundtrack albums with selected details, sales, and certification
Title	Album details	Sales	Certifications
Credited as Peterpan
OST Alexandria	Released: June 26, 2005; Label: Musica Studios; Formats: CD, cassette, digital download	IDN: 1,300,000+	ASIRI: 8× Platinum

==== Re-recorded albums ====
List of re-recorded albums with selected details, sales, and certification
Title	Album details	Sales	Certifications
Second Chance	Released: December 31, 2014; Label: Musica Studios; Formats: CD, digital download	—N/a	—N/a
Taman Langit	Released: 17 December 2021; Label: Musica Studio's; Formats: CD, digital download	—N/a	—N/a
Bintang di Surga	Released: 12 January 2022; Label: Musica Studio's; Formats: Digital download	—N/a	—N/a
Hari yang Cerah	Released: 26 January 2022; Label: Musica Studio's; Formats: Digital download	—N/a	—N/a

==== Compilation albums ====
List of compilation albums with selected details, sales, and certification
Title	Album details	Sales	Certifications
Credited as Peterpan
Sebuah Nama Sebuah Cerita	Released: August 2008; Label: Musica Studios; Formats: CD, digital download	580,000	—N/a
Credited as Noah
Sings Legends	Released: May 25, 2016; Label: Musica Studios; Formats: CD, digital download	—N/a	—N/a

==== Collaboration albums ====
List of collaboration albums with selected details
Title	Album details
Kisah 2002 Malam	Released: July 2002; Label: Musica Studios; Formats: CD, cassette
Senyawa	Released: 2004; Label: Musica Studios; Formats: CD, cassette
Dari Hati Untuk Aceh	Released: February 28, 2005; Label: Musica Studios; Formats: CD, cassette
Untuk Sahabat Peterpan	Released: 2005; Label: Musica Studios; Formats: CD, cassette
Superstar 2005	Released: 2005; Label: Musica Studios; Formats: CD, cassette
Superstar 2005 Vol. 2	Released: 2005; Label: Musica Studios; Formats: CD, cassette
From Us to U	Released: November 6, 2005; Label: Musica Studios; Formats: CD, cassette, digital download
In House Mix	Released: 2005; Label: Musica Studios; Formats: CD, cassette
Superstar 2006	Released: 2006; Label: Musica Studios; Formats: CD, cassette
Duet by Request	Released: 2006; Label: Musica Studios; Formats: CD, cassette
Selalu Untuk Sahabat	Released: 2006; Label: Musica Studios; Formats: CD, cassette
Superstar 2007	Released: 2007; Label: Musica Studios; Formats: CD, cassette

=== Singles ===
==== As lead artist ====
List of singles as lead artist with selected chart positions
Title	Year	Peak chart positions	Album
Title	Year	IDN Hot 100	Album
Credited as Peterpan (2001–09)
"Mimpi Yang Sempurna"	2003	—	Kisah 2002 Malam & Taman Langit
"Sahabat"	2003	—	Taman Langit
"Aku dan Bintang"	2003	—	Taman Langit
"Topeng"	2003	—	Taman Langit
"Semua Tentang Kita"	2003	—	Taman Langit
"Yang Terdalam"	2003	—	Taman Langit
"Kita Tertawa"	2003	—	Taman Langit
"Ada Apa Denganmu"	2004	—	Bintang di Surga
"Mungkin Nanti"	2004	—	Bintang di Surga
"Kukatakan dengan Indah"	2004	—	Bintang di Surga
"Khayalan Tingkat Tinggi"	2004	—	Bintang di Surga
"Bintang di Surga"	2004	—	Bintang di Surga
"Di Atas Normal"	2004	—	Bintang di Surga
"Tak Bisakah"	2005	—	OST Alexandria
"Jauh Mimpiku"	2005	—	OST Alexandria
"Menunggu Pagi"	2005	—	OST Alexandria
"Langit Tak Mendengar"	2005	—	OST Alexandria
"Membebaniku"	2005	—	OST Alexandria
"Menunggumu" (with Chrisye)	2005	—	Senyawa
"Kupu-Kupu Malam"	2005	—	From Us to U
"Menghapus Jejakmu"	2007	—	Hari Yang Cerah
"Di Balik Awan"	2007	—	Hari Yang Cerah
"Sally Sendiri"	2007	—	Hari Yang Cerah
"Hari yang Cerah untuk Jiwa yang Sepi"	2007	—	Hari Yang Cerah
"Cobalah Mengerti"	2007	—	Hari Yang Cerah
"Walau Habis Terang"	2008	—	Sebuah Nama Sebuah Cerita
"Kisah Cintaku"	2008	—	Sebuah Nama Sebuah Cerita
"Tak Ada yang Abadi"	2009	—	Sebuah Nama Sebuah Cerita
Credited as Noah (2012–2023)
"Separuh Aku"	2012	57	Seperti Seharusnya
"Hidup Untukmu, Mati Tanpamu"	2012	—	Seperti Seharusnya
"Jika Engkau"	2013	—	Seperti Seharusnya
"Tak Lagi Sama"	2013	—	Seperti Seharusnya
"Ini Cinta"	2014	—	Seperti Seharusnya
"Hero"	2014	—	Second Chance
"Seperti Kemarin"	2014	—	Second Chance
"Menunggumu" (New single in 2005)	2015	—	Second Chance
"Suara Pikiranku"	2015	—	Second Chance
"Sajadah Panjang"	2016	—	Sings Legends
"Andaikan Kau Datang"	2016	—	Sings Legends
"Tinggallah Kusendiri"	2016	—	Sings Legends
"My Situation" / "Jalani Mimpi" (Note: On iTunes, "Jalani Mimpi" and "My Situation" are released as separate singles. While on JOOX and Spotify, they are released as a single, titled "New Singles".)	2017	—	Keterkaitan Keterikatan
"My Situation" / "Jalani Mimpi"	2017	—	Keterkaitan Keterikatan
"Biar Ku Sendiri"	2017	—	Sings Legends
"Wanitaku"	2019	20	Keterkaitan Keterikatan
"Kupeluk Hatimu"	2019	20	Keterkaitan Keterikatan
"Kau Udara Bagiku"	2019	73	Keterkaitan Keterikatan
"Kala Cinta Menggoda"	2020	—	Puspa Ragam Karya Guruh Soekarno Putra 2020
"Menemaniku"	2020	—	Keterkaitan Keterikatan
"우리의 이야기 Urieui Iyagi (Semua Tentang Kita)" (with Shakira Jasmine)	2021	—	Keterkaitan Keterikatan – Acoustic Version in 360° (Part 1)
"Mencari Cinta" (with Bunga Citra Lestari)	2021	—	Keterkaitan Keterikatan
"Badai Pasti Berlalu"	2021	—	Non-album single
"Yang Terdalam"	2021	—	Taman Langit (Noah version)
"Bintang di Surga"	2022	—	Bintang di Surga (Noah version)
"Menghapus Jejakmu" (featuring Rejoz of The Groove)	2022	—	Hari Yang Cerah (Noah version)
"Di Atas Normal	2022	—	Bintang Disurga (Noah version)
"Kota Mati"	2022	—	Hari Yang Cerah (Noah version)
"Khayalan Tingkat Tinggi"	2022	—	Bintang Disurga (Noah version)
"—" denotes releases that did not chart.	2022		

==== As featured artist ====
List of singles as featured artist
Title	Year	Featuring	Album
"Ayah – Aceh"	2005	Candil Seurius	Non-album singles
"Marilah Kemari"	2006	Iwan Fals, Chrisye, Project Pop, Ungu, Rossa, Kahitna, Seurieus & Naif	Non-album singles
"Usia 17"	2006	Nuri Shaden	Non-album singles
"Yang Terlupakan"	2015	Iwan Fals	Satu

==== Promotional singles ====
List of promotional singles
Title	Year	Album
Credited as Ariel, Uki, Lukman, Reza & David
"Cobalah Mengerti" (featuring Momo Geisha)	2012	Suara Lainnya
"Sahabat" (featuring Karinding Attack)	2013	Suara Lainnya

== Music videos ==
List of music videos, showing director(s) and year released
Title	Year	Director(s)	Album	Link
"Mimpi yang Sempurna"	2003	Eric Wiradipoetra	Kisah 2002 Malam	
"Sahabat"	2003	Tony Tandun	Taman Langit	
"Aku dan Bintang"	2003	Eugene Panji	Taman Langit	
"Topeng"	2003	Rizal Mantovani	Taman Langit	
"Semua Tentang Kita"	2003	Dimas Djayadiningrat	Taman Langit	
"Yang Terdalam"	2003	The Jadugar	Taman Langit	
"Kita Tertawa"	2003	Unknown	Taman Langit	
"Ada Apa Denganmu"	2004	Dimas Djayadiningrat	Bintang di Surga	
"Mungkin Nanti"	2004	Parallel	Bintang di Surga	
"Ku Katakan dengan Indah"	2004	Condro Wibowo	Bintang di Surga	
"Khayalan Tingkat Tinggi"	2004	Unknown	Bintang di Surga	
"Bintang di Surga"	2004	Rizal Mantovani	Bintang di Surga	
"Di Atas Normal"	2004	The Jadugar	Bintang di Surga	
"Menunggumu" (featuring Chrisye)	2004	Agung Sentausa	Senyawa	
"Tak Bisakah"	2005	Ody C. Harahap, Dimas Djayadiningrat	OST Alexandria	
"Jauh Mimpiku"	2005	Ody C. Harahap, Dimas Djayadiningrat	OST Alexandria	
"Menunggu Pagi"	2005	Agung Sentausa	OST Alexandria	
"Langit Tak Mendengar"	2005	Rizal Mantovani	OST Alexandria	
"Di Belakangku"	2005	Kuteu Mayanti	OST Alexandria	
"Membebaniku"	2005	Unknown	OST Alexandria	
"Kupu-Kupu Malam"	2005	Unknown	From Us to U	
"Menghapus Jejakmu"	2007	Sim F	Hari Yang Cerah	
"Di Balik Awan"	2007	Abimael Gandy	Hari Yang Cerah	
"Sally Sendiri"	2007	Abimael Gandy	Hari Yang Cerah	
"Hari yang Cerah untuk Jiwa yang Sepi"	2007	Cerahati	Hari Yang Cerah	
"Cobalah Mengerti"	2008	Abimael Gandy	Hari Yang Cerah	
"Walau Habis Terang"	2008	Sim F	Sebuah Nama Sebuah Cerita	
"Kisah Cintaku"	2008	Rizal Mantovani	Sebuah Nama Sebuah Cerita	
"Dilema Besar"	2008	Unknown	Sebuah Nama Sebuah Cerita	
"Tak Ada yang Abadi"	2008	Dimas Djayadiningrat	Sebuah Nama Sebuah Cerita	
"Cobalah Mengerti" (featuring Momo Geisha)	2012	Anggy Umbara	Suara Lainnya	
"Separuh Aku"	2012	Nicholas Nicky	Seperti Seharusnya	
"Hidup Untukmu, Mati Tanpamu"	2012	Rizal Mantovani	Seperti Seharusnya	
"Jika Engkau"	2013	Sim F	Seperti Seharusnya	
"Tak Lagi Sama"	2013	Upie Guava	Seperti Seharusnya	
"Sahabat" (featuring Karinding Attack)	2013	Miftah Salim, Akhmad Dody Firmansyah	Suara Lainnya	
"Ini Cinta"	2014	Upie Guava	Seperti Seharusnya	
"Hero"	2014	Felipe P. Soares	Second Chance	
"Seperti Kemarin"	2015	Upie Guava	Second Chance	
"Menunggumu"	2015	Sakti Mahendra	Second Chance	
"Suara Pikiranku"	2015	Dimas Djayadiningrat	Second Chance	
"Yang Terlupakan" (featuring Iwan Fals)	2015	Sakti Mahendra	Satu	
"Sajadah Panjang"	2016	Rizal Mantovani	Sings Legends	
"Andaikan Kau Datang"	2016	Hedy Suryawan	Sings Legends	
"Cinta Bukan Dusta"	2016	Upie Guava	Sings Legends	
"Biar Ku Sendiri"	2017	Rizal Mantovani	Sings Legends	
"My Situation"	2018	Upie Guava	Keterkaitan Keterikatan	
"Jalani Mimpi"	2018	Unknown	Keterkaitan Keterikatan	
"Wanitaku"	2019	Candi Soeleman	Keterkaitan Keterikatan	
"Kupeluk Hatimu"	2019	Upie Guava	Keterkaitan Keterikatan	
"Kau Udara Bagiku"	2019	Upie Guava	Keterkaitan Keterikatan	
"Kala Cinta Menggoda"	2020	Upie Guava	Puspa Ragam Karya Guruh Soekarno Putra	
"Menemaniku"	2020	Candi Soeleman	Keterkaitan Keterikatan	
"Mendekati Lugu"	2021	Upie Guava	Keterkaitan Keterikatan	
"Mencari Cinta" (featuring Bunga Citra Lestari)	2021	Prialangga	Keterkaitan Keterikatan	
"Badai Pasti Berlalu"	2021	Upie Guava	Non-album single	
"Yang Terdalam" (Noah version)	2021	Gianni Fajri	Taman Langit	
"Bintang Di Surga" (Noah version)	2022	Upie Guava	Bintang Di Surga	
"Menghapus Jejakmu" (Noah version)	2022	Gianni Fajri	Hari Yang Cerah	
"Diatas Normal" (Noah version)	2022	Upie Guava	Bintang Disurga	
"Kota Mati" (Noah version)	2022	Upie Guava	Hari Yang Cerah	
Khayalan Tingkat Tinggi" (Noah Version)	2022		Upie Guava	Bintang Di Surga

== Filmography ==
=== Film ===
Year	Title	Role	Notes
2013	NOAH: Awal Semula	Themselves	

== See also ==
- List of Indonesian rock bands
- List of alternative-rock artists
- List of best selling albums of all time in Indonesia
