= Ilsyah Ryan Reza =

Indonesian drummer

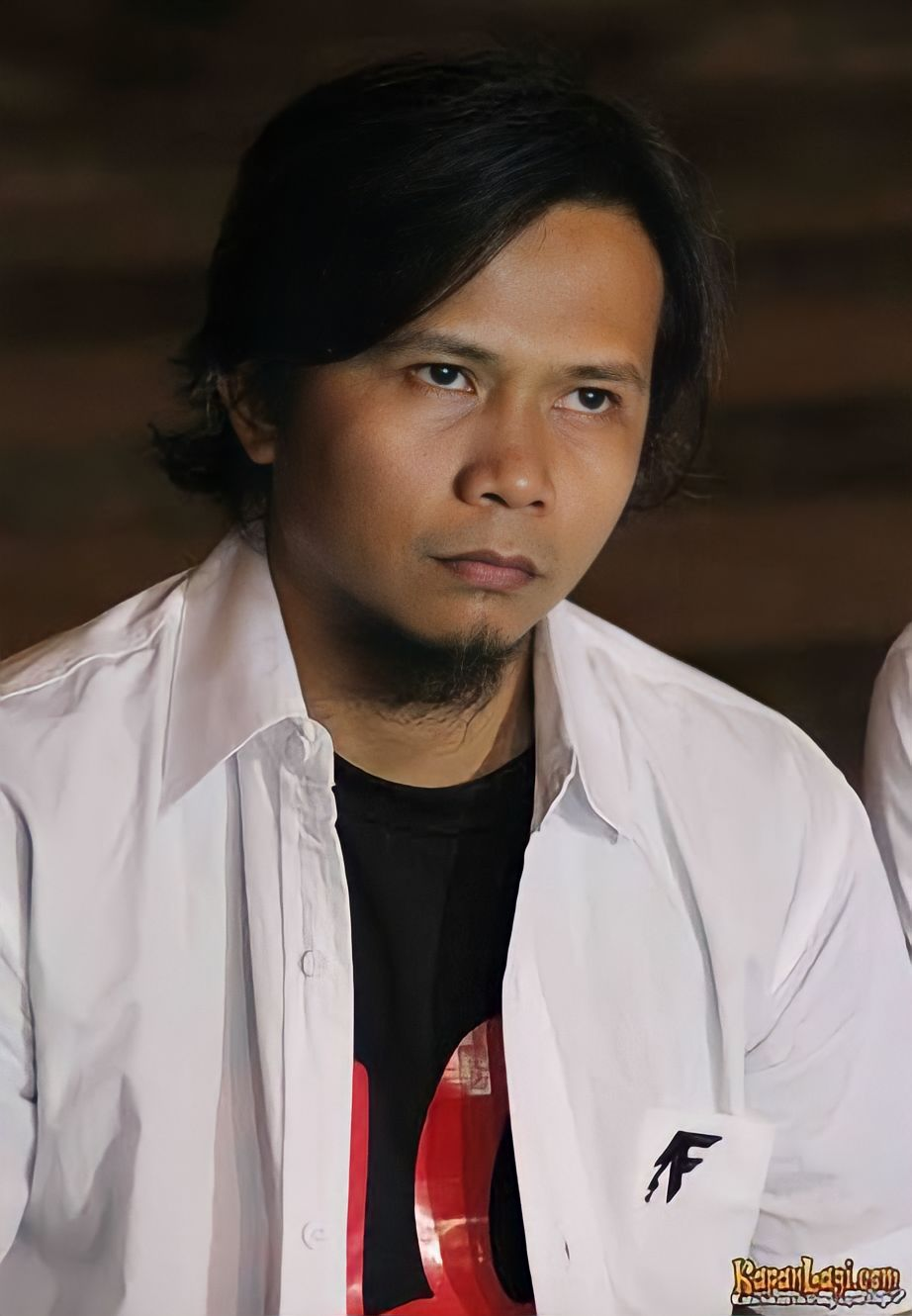
- Born: Ilsyah Ryan Reza; March 11, 1977 (age 49); Poso, Central Sulawesi, Indonesia
- Other name: Reza Noah
- Occupation: Musician
- Years active: 1991–present
- Spouse: Dewi Chairunnisa
- Children: Azizah Michelle Putri Reza; Danish Muqeet; Aisyah Hanna
- Parent(s): Syahrun Dariseh; Ilma Tantu
- Website: www.noah-site.com

Ilsyah Ryan Reza or his popular name Reza Noah (born March 11, 1977), is the former drummer of the musical group Noah. He left the band on January 1, 2015.

== Early life and career ==
Reza moved to Bandung in 1990 to further his education. He joined a band called Black Forest. He was occasionally called to fill in as drummer with the band Noah, which at that time was called Peterpan. He replaced their original drummer Ari in 2001.

The band released six albums during Reza's tenure: Taman Langit, Bintang di Surga, Ost. Alexandria, Hari Yang Cerah, Sebuah Nama Sebuah Cerita and Seperti Seharusnya. Reza played drums with a band called Tridia when Peterpan was on hiatus in 2011. He left Noah in January 2015 to pursue religious studies.

== Filmography ==
=== Film ===
Year	Title	Role
2013	Noah: Awal Semula	Reza

== Books ==
- Kisah Lainnya (2012)
- 6.903 mil – Cerita Dibalik Konser 5 Benua 5 Negara (2013)

== Awards and nominations ==
Year	Awards	Category	Result
2009	SCTV Music Awards	Most Famous Drummer Player	Nominated
2013	SCTV Music Awards	Most Famous Drummer Player	Nominated
2014	SCTV Music Awards	Most Famous Drummer Player	Nominated
