= Bintang di Surga =

2004 studio album by Peterpan

Studio album by Peterpan
- Released: July 26, 2004
- Recorded: 2004
- Genre: Rock, alternative rock, pop rock, post-grunge, power ballad
- Length: 42:35
- Label: Musica Studio's
- Producer: Noey, Capung

Peterpan chronology
Taman Langit (2003)	Bintang di Surga (2004)	OST Alexandria (2005)

Bintang di Surga is the second studio album by Indonesian alternative rock band Peterpan. Rolling Stone Indonesia magazine ranked the album #116 on "The 150 Greatest Indonesian Albums of All Time" list., A song from this album, "Kukatakan Dengan Indah", got a place at #140 on Rolling Stone Indonesia's "150 Greatest Indonesian Songs of All Time" list.

Bintang di Surga is generally considered to be one of the best selling albums of all time in Indonesia, with 3 million copies sold.

== Artwork ==
The concept for Bintang di Surga's cover and graphic design was made by Thovfa CB. For the album's graphic design, Thofva CB won Best Graphic Designer award in Anugerah Musik Indonesia 2005.

== Promotion ==
To promote the album, Peterpan held concerts in six cities on a single day on July 18, 2004. The concerts started in Medan, North Sumatra at 7:55, then continued in Padang, Pekanbaru, Lampung, Semarang, and ended in Surabaya, East Java at 23:00. Peterpan received an award from Indonesian World Records Museum for performing in six cities under 24 hours.

== Accolades ==
In 2005, Bintang di Surga won three Anugerah Musik Indonesia awards for Best of the Best Album, Best Pop Alternative Album and Best Graphic Designer.

== Noah version ==
Bintang di Surga

Studio album by Noah
- Released: January 12, 2022
- Recorded: 2015–2021
- Genre: Alternative rock, pop rock, electronic rock
- Length: 36:15
- Label: Musica Studio's
- Producer: Noey, Capung

Noah chronology
Taman Langit (2021)	Bintang di Surga (2022)	Hari yang Cerah (2022)

In 2012, Peterpan changed their name to Noah. Due to several reasons, such as wanting their old song to be released under Noah name, a desire to improve the recordings since some songs were not recorded the way they wished, and in order to properly adapt their old songs to digital format, Noah re-recorded their songs from Peterpan era. Noah's version of Bintang di Surga was released on 12 January 2022.

In the new Noah version of the album, there are two songs not included in the track listing, which are ‘Aku’ and ‘Masa Lalu Tertinggal’. There was no explanation at the moment, depicting on why these two tracks were not included in the new album.

== Track listing ==
All tracks are written by Ariel, except for "Aku" which is written by Ariel and Andika and "Masa Lalu Tertinggal" which is written by Ariel and Indra.

No.	Title	Length
1.	"Ada Apa Denganmu" (What's Wrong With You)	4:40
2.	"Mungkin Nanti" (Maybe Later)	4:28
3.	"Khayalan Tingkat Tinggi" (High-Level Imagination)	3:23
4.	"Di Belakangku" (Behind Me)	5:02
5.	"Ku Katakan Dengan Indah" (I Say It Beautifully)	5:34
6.	"2 DSD"	3:40
7.	"Diatas Normal" (Above Normal)	3:35
8.	"Aku" (I)	3:01
9.	"Masa Lalu Tertinggal" (The Past Behind)	3:56
10.	"Bintang di Surga" (Stars in Heaven)	5:00
Total length:		42:23

== Personnel ==
Additional personnel credits are adapted from the album's liner notes.

Peterpan

- Ariel – vocals
- Andika – keyboard
- Indra – bass guitar
- Lukman – guitar
- Reza – drum
- Uki – guitar

Additional personnel

- Capung – engineering
- Ferry "Fei" – string engineering on track 4 (with Christian Hermawan)
- Heirrue Buchaery – mixing
- Khoe Hok Laij – mastering
- Job Rusli – string arrangement on track 4, 6 and 10
- Ria – vocals on track 4
- Iwan Setia – violin 1
- I. Nyoman Mahendra – violin 1
- Yoyo Sunarya – violin 1
- Satrio A.Y. – violin 1
- Fitrah Ramadhan – violin 2
- Dedy Akhmad – violin 2
- Raga Dipanegara – violin 2
- Angga Aditia – alto violin
- Agus Firmansyah – alto violin
- Juliandani – cello
- Unun S.P. – cello

== Certifications ==
Country	Certification
Indonesia	Platinum
Malaysia	Platinum
