= Uki Noah =

Indonesian guitarist

Mohammad Kautsar Hikmat
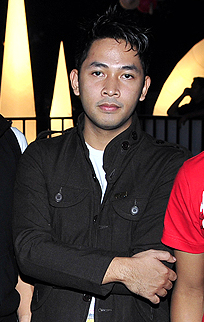
- Uki in 2008
- Born: Mohammad Kaustar Hikmat; October 5, 1981 (age 44); Bandung, West Java, Indonesia
- Other name: Uki Noah
- Occupations: Musician; producer
- Spouse: Metha Yunatria (m. 2009)
- Children: 1
- Parent(s): Hikmat Iskandar; Listia Indrawati
- Musical career
- Genres: Pop; rock; pop rock; alternative rock
- Instrument: Guitar
- Years active: 1996–2019
- Label: Musica Studio's
- Formerly of: Noah

Mohammad Kautsar Hikmat (born October 5, 1981), known professionally as Uki Noah, is an Indonesian former guitarist who is best known as the rhythm and lead guitarist of the pop band Noah for 19 years.

== Early life ==
He was born in Bandung, West Java, into an educated family. The nickname 'Uki' was given to him by his brother. His father, Hikmat Iskandar, has a Master of Science degree and is a researcher and expert in transportation infrastructure. The family moved to Australia in 1989 and stayed for four years. Uki attended the Bandung Institute of Technology on a scholarship. Uki was also a guest lecturer at the Bandung Institute of Technology.

== Musical career ==
Uki has been interested in music since junior high school, and taught himself to play guitar. He received a guitar for a gift on his 15th birthday, and his father taught him how to play chords. He also learned a lot from his friend Ariel, who he met in junior high. The two formed a band called Peppermint. After Peppermint, Uki and Ariel formed a band called Sliver and Cholesterol, together Qibil and Erick. The two next joined the group Topi, with Uki playing rhythm. Uki next joined Peterpan (now Noah). He founded his own record label named Masterplan Records and formed his own band, called Astoria. He worked as producer for The Changcuters first album, Mencoba Sukses.

After an umrah, Uki began to have doubts about continuing his musical career. After following Syafiq Riza's lectures and meeting him in person during a flight, Uki began to stop performing in cafes as he no longer wanted to be in a place that sells alcoholic beverage. After performing with Noah for a New Year's Eve 2018–2019 celebration, Uki privately decided to quit music altogether, citing how he has to join a celebration observed by non-Muslims and how the celebration led to people committing vices. In early 2019, Uki told other members of Noah about his intention to leave the band. Uki completed his last responsibilities for Noah's album Keterkaitan Keterikatan before his departure was announced in August 2019 when the album was released.

== Post-Noah ==
After leaving Noah, Uki started a Muslim fashion business named Emka Clothing.

== Personal life ==
In 2009, Uki married a soap opera actress, Metha Yunatria. They have one child, and lost a second child shortly after birth, in July 2015.

== Filmography ==
Year	Title	Role
2013	Noah: Awal Semula	Uki

== Book ==
- Kisah Lainnya (2012)
- 6.903 mil – Cerita Dibalik Konser 5 Benua 5 Negara (2013)

== Awards and nominations ==
Year	Awards	Category	Results
2009	SCTV Music Awards	Most Famous Guitarist Player	Nominated
2013	Yahoo! OMG Awards	Sexiest Dad	Nominated
2013	SCTV Music Awards	Most Famous Guitarist Player	Nominated
2014	SCTV Music Awards	Most Famous Guitarist Player	Nominated
