= Taman Langit =

Studio album by Peterpan
- Released: May 3, 2003
- Recorded: 2002–03
- Genre: Rock, pop rock, alternative rock, grunge
- Length: 44:31
- Label: Musica Studios
- Producer: Capung, Noey

Peterpan chronology
Taman Langit (2003)	Bintang di Surga (2004)

Taman Langit is the first studio album by the Indonesian band Peterpan. The album was released on May 3, 2003, through Musica Studios and has sold over 850,000 copies in Indonesia.

== Track listing ==
All tracks are written by Ariel, except for "Sahabat" which is written by Ariel, Uki, and Lukman, and "Kita Tertawa" which is written by Ariel and Lukman.

1. "Sahabat" (Best Friend) – 4:31
2. "Aku & Bintang" (I and the Star) – 3:37
3. "Semua Tentang Kita" (All About Us) – 4:25
4. "Dan Hilang" (And Disappear) – 3:54
5. "Satu Hati" (One Heart) – 4:28
6. "Mimpi yang Sempurna" (The Perfect Dream) – 4:29
7. "Taman Langit" (The Sky Garden) – 3:31
8. "Yang Terdalam" (The Deepest) – 3:17
9. "Tertinggalkan Waktu" (Left in Time) – 4:04
10. "Kita Tertawa" (We Laugh) – 3:27
11. "Topeng" (Mask) – 4:25

== Personnel ==
Band

- Ariel – vocals
- Lukman – guitar
- Uki – guitar
- Indra – bass
- Andika – piano, keyboard
- Reza – drums, percussion

Production

- Noey, Capung – production

== Noah version ==
Taman Langit

Studio album by Noah
- Released: December 17, 2021
- Recorded: 2015–2021
- Genre: Pop rock, alternative rock, Grunge
- Length: 43:55
- Label: Musica Studios
- Producer: Capung, Noey

Noah chronology
Keterkaitan Keterikatan – Acoustic Version in 360° (2021)	Taman Langit (2021)	Bintang di Surga (2022)

In 2012, Peterpan changed their name to Noah. For several reasons, such as wanting their old song to be released under Noah's name, a desire to improve the recordings since some songs were not recorded the way they wished, and to properly adapt their old songs to digital format, Noah re-recorded their songs from Peterpan era. Noah's version of Taman Langit was released on December 17, 2021.
