= Rossa discography =

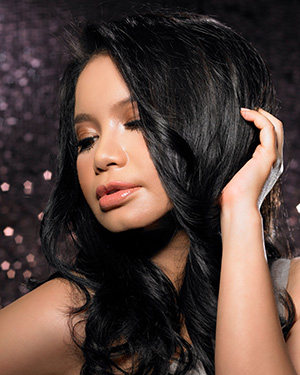
- A Profile of the Queen of Indonesian Pop, Rossa
- Studio albums: 14
- EPs: 1
- Soundtrack albums: 5
- Compilation albums: 12
- Singles: 49
- Video albums: 9
- Music videos: 74

Rossa began her career as a child singer, releasing her debut album Gadis Ingusan in 1988, followed by Untuk Sahabatku in 1990; neither achieved significant commercial success.

She released Nada-Nada Cinta in 1996, which sold more than 750,000 copies. This was followed by Tegar (1999), which received multiple platinum certifications, and Hati Yang Terpilih (2000). Her subsequent albums—Kini (2002), Kembali (2004), and Yang Terpilih (2006)—further expanded her popularity in Indonesia and neighboring countries.

In 2007, she served as the lead vocalist for the soundtrack of the film Ayat-Ayat Cinta. Her self-titled album Rossa was released in 2009. Throughout her career, Rossa has released numerous solo, collaborative, and compilation albums, many of which achieved platinum, multi-platinum, and million-sales certifications. Several of her albums have also been included among the top 10 best-selling Indonesian albums of all time.

== Studio albums ==
Title	Album details
Gadis Ingusan	Released: 1988; Label: Pro-Sound; Formats: CD, cassette
Untuk Sahabatku	Released: 1990; Label: Pro-Sound; Formats: CD, cassette
Nada-Nada Cinta	Released: January 27, 1996; Label: Pro-Sound; Formats: Formats: CD, cassette, digital download
Tegar	Released: November 25, 1999; Label: Pro-Sound; Formats: Formats: CD, cassette, digital download
Kini	Released: April 30, 2002; Label: Pro-Sound / Trinity Optima Production; Formats: CD, cassette, digital download
Kini (Repackaged)	Released: May 19, 2003; Label: Pro-Sound / Trinity Optima Production; Formats: CD, cassette, digital download
Kembali	Released: December 24, 2004; Label: Pro-Sound / Trinity Optima Production; Formats: CD, cassette, digital download
Yang Terpilih	Released: December 26, 2006; Label: Trinity Optima Production / Pro-Sound; Formats: CD, cassette, digital download
Rossa (Self-Titled)	Released: January 14, 2009; Label: Trinity Optima Production / Pro-Sound; Formats: CD, cassette, digital download
Harmoni Jalinan Nada & Cerita	Released: August 5, 2010; Label: Trinity Optima Production; Formats: CD, cassette, digital download
Love, Life & Music (Special Edition)	Released: May 1st, 2014; Label: Trinity Optima Production; Formats: CD, digital download
Love, Life & Music	Released: May 19, 2014; Label: Trinity Optima Production; Formats: CD, digital download
A New Chapter	Released: April 5, 2017; Label: Trinity Optima Production; Formats: CD, digital download
Another Journey : The Beginning	Released: February 10, 2023; Label: Inspire Music; Formats: CD, digital download

== EPs ==
Title	Album details
Asmara Dansa	Released: October 10, 2025; Label: Inspire Music; Formats: digital download

== Greatest hits albums ==
Title	Album details
Hati Yang Terpilih	Released: August 20, 2000; Label: Pro-Sound; Formats: CD, cassette
The Best of Rossa	Released: November 30, 2011; Label: Trinity Optima Production; Formats: CD, digital download
Platinum Collection	Released: June 18, 2013; Label: Trinity Optima Production; Formats: CD, digital download

== Digital compilation albums (Special Edition) ==
Title	Album details
The History (Nokia Special Edition)	Released: 2010; Label: Trinity Optima Production; Formats: digital download
Platinum Collection (Nokia Mix Radio Special Edition)	Released: 2013; Label: Trinity Optima Production; Formats: digital download
The History (Apple Special Edition)	Released: October 1st, 2014; Label: Trinity Optima Production; Formats: digital download

== Compilation albums ==
Title	Album details
From Us To U (Tribute to Titiek Puspa)	Released: June 20, 2005; Label: Musica Studio; Formats: CD, cassette, digital download
OST. Ayat-Ayat Cinta	Released: December 17, 2007; Label: Trinity Optima Production; Formats: CD, cassette, digital download
Bebi Romeo Masterpiece	Released: December 18, 2012; Label: Mega Music; Formats: CD, digital download
KFC Adu Bintang	Released: January 14, 2013; Label: Swara Sangkar Emas; Formats: CD, digital download
OST. Soekarno	Released: November 12, 2013; Label: Trinity Optima Production; Formats: CD, digital download
Havoc (Joe Flizzow)	Released: December 7, 2013; Label: Sony Music Malaysia; Formats: CD, digital download
OST. Ayat-Ayat Cinta 2	Released: December 4, 2017; Label: MD Music Indonesia; Formats: CD, digital download
Asian Games 2018	Released: July 13, 2018; Label: ASIRI, INASGOC, Jagonya Musik & Sport; Formats: CD, digital download
Love (D'Massiv)	Released: June 9, 2019; Label: Musica Studio; Formats: CD, digital download
OST. Masih Cinta Terbaik	Released: March 20, 2020; Label: Inspire Music; Formats: digital download
OST. Love Knots	Released: December 17, 2021; Label: Inspire Music; Formats: digital download

== Video albums ==
=== VCDs ===
Title	Album details
VCD Karaoke Rossa - Original VCD Karaoke + Clips	Released: 2006; Label: Trinity Optima Production; Country: Indonesia
Original VCD & Clips MTV Karaoke	Released: 2006; Label: Suria; Country: Malaysia, Singapore, Brunei
VCD Ekonomis Karaoke Original	Released: 2009; Label: Trinity Optima; Country: Indonesia
Rossa VCD Karaoke Vo.2	Released: 2010; Label: Suria; Country: Malaysia, Singapore, Brunei
The Best of Rossa	Released: 2013; Label: Suria; Country: Malaysia, Singapore, Brunei

=== DVDs ===
Title	Album details
DVD Karaoke Rossa Vol.1 - Original DVD Karaoke + Clips	Released: 2006; Label: Trinity Optima; Country: Indonesia
DVD Karaoke Rossa Vol.2	Released: 2010; Label: Trinity Optima; Country: Indonesia
DVD Diva Family Karaoke	Released: 2012; Label: Trinity Optima; Country: Indonesia
The Best of Rossa	Released: 2012; Label: Suria; Country: Malaysia, Singapore, Brunei

== Singles and soundtrack songs ==
Title	Release Date	Detail(s)
Cinta	June 20, 2005	From Us to U (Tribute to Titiek Puspa)
Marilah Kemari (feat. All Artist)	June 20, 2005	From Us to U (Tribute to Titiek Puspa)
Ayat-Ayat Cinta	December 17, 2007	OST. Ayat-Ayat Cinta
Takdir Cinta	December 17, 2007	OST. Ayat-Ayat Cinta
Tercipta Untukku (feat. Ungu)	December 17, 2007	OST. Ayat-Ayat Cinta
Setinggi Mimpi Mereka (feat. All Artist)	February 2nd, 2009	Theme Song Unicef Indonesia - Single
Sang Surya	September 8, 2010	OST. Sang Pencerah - Single
Ku Pinang Kau Dengan Bismillah (feat. Ungu)	July 4, 2011	Single
Aku Bersahaja (feat. Taufik Batisah)	October 15, 2011	Single
Bukan Cinta Biasa (feat. Bebi Romeo)	December 18, 2012	Bebi Romeo Masterpiece
Rasa Terindah (feat. Afgan & Pasha Ungu)	January 3rd, 2013	KFC Adu Bintang
Syukur	November 12, 2011	OST. Soekarno
Indonesia Pusaka	November 12, 2011	OST. Soekarno
Salahkah (feat. Hafiz Suip)	November 13, 2013	OST. Bukan Kerana Aku Tak Cinta - Single
Katakan (feat. Joe Flizzow)	December 7, 2013	Havoc
Hijrah Cinta	February 16, 2014	OST. Hijrah Cinta - Single
Your Dreams Our Inspiration	May 1st, 2014	Theme Song Oriflame - Single
Pesona Indonesia & Wonderful Indonesia	2015	Theme Song Ministry of Tourism of the Republic of Indonesia - Single
Kebebasan (feat. All Artist)	May 23, 2016	Theme Song Yonder Music Indonesia - Single
Jangan Hilangkan Dia	June 8, 2013	OST. ILY from 38.000 FT - Single
Satu Indonesiaku (feat. All Artist)	December 20, 2016	Single
Body Speak	February 22, 2017	Single
Cinta Dalam Hidupku	March 1st, 2017	OST. London Love Story 2 - Single
Bulan Dikekang Malam	October 17, 2017	OST. Ayat-Ayat Cinta 2
Bright As The Sun (feat. All Artist)	November 2nd, 2017	Theme Song Asian Games 2018
Hidup Itu Indah (Life is Beautiful)	January 1st, 2018	Theme Song Oriflame - Single
Pernah Memiliki (feat. D'Masiv & David Noah)	March 1st, 2018	Single
The Good Is Back (feat. Anggun)	April 20, 2018	Single
Cahaya Dalam Sunyi (feat. All Artist)	June 6, 2018	Qur'an ID Project
HARA (feat. All Artist)	August 3rd, 2018	Single
Rimba Raya	November 20, 2018	Theme Song Ministry of Environment and Forestry of the Republic of Indonesia - Single
Sampah Sayang (feat. Titiek Puspa & All Artist)	January 27, 2019	Single
Karena Cinta Yang Menemani	September 23, 2019	OST. Susi Susanti Love All - Single
Tegar 2.0	September 29, 2019	Single
Where Peace Begins" (One Family Under God) (feat. Harvey Malaiholo)	November 5, 2019	Theme Song Global Peace Foundation Indonesia - Single
Masih	March 4, 2020	OST. Masih Cinta Terbaik
Satu Cara (feat. All Artist)	April 9, 2020	Single
The Heart You Hurt (Hati Yang Kau Sakiti - Korean Version)	August 14, 2020	Single
Indonesia Bersatu (feat. All Artist)	2020	Single
Wanita	July 16, 2021	Single
Bertahanlah (feat. All Artist)	July 31, 2021	Single
Zambrud Khatulistiwa (feat. All Artist)	August 13, 2021	Theme Song Resso Indonesia - Single
Terlalu Berharap	November 16, 2021	OST. Love Knots
Sekali Ini Saja	April 15, 2022	Single
Bawalah Aku Pergi	January 27, 2023	OST. Mantan Tapi Menikah - Single
Khanti	March 31, 2018	OST. Bidadari Bermata Bening - Single
Nada-Nada Cinta (feat. Ariel Noah)	August 8, 2024	OST. All Access To Rossa 25 Shining Years - Single
Serasa X Juwita	May 9, 2025	Single
Aku Baik Saja	May 16, 2025	OST. Tak Ingin Usai Disini - Single

== Music videos ==
Title	Year	Director	Model
Nyanyian Anak Alam	1988	Sekar Ayu Asmara	Rossa
Untuk Sahabatku	1990	Sekar Ayu Asmara	Rossa
Nada-Nada Cinta - Single Version	1996	Richard Buntario	-
Nada-Nada Cinta - Album Version	1997	-	Ivan Ray
Tegar	1999	Bianca Adinegoro	Tegar
Hati Yang Terpilih	2000	Abimael Gandy	Abimana Aryasatya
Kini	2002	Bianca Adinegoro	-
Sakura - MTV Asia Version (Album Version)	2002	Farid Dermawan	Rossa
Sakura - Soundtrack Version	2002	Abimael Gandy	Rossa
Perawan Cinta	2002	Stephen Walangitang	-
Bila Salah	2003	Rizal Mantovani	Gary Iskak
Malam Pertama	2003	Rizal Mantovani	Ferdy Thaeras
Aku Bukan Untukmu	2004	Dimas Djayadiningrat	Agastya Kandou
Pudar - MTV Asia Version (Album Version)	2005	Rizal Mantovani	Lucky Hakim
Pudar - Soundtrack Version	2005	Rizal Mantovani	Masayu Anastasia & Hengky Kurniawan
Wanita Yang Kau Pilih	2005	Rizal Mantovani	Vino G. Bastian
Cinta	2005	Rizal Mantovani	Agastya Kandou
Marilah Kemari (feat. All Artist)	2005	Agung Sentausa	Rossa & All Artists
Atas Nama Cinta	2006	Abimael Gandy	Nino Fernandez
Terlalu Cinta	2007	Abimael Gandy	Richard Kevin
Ayat-Ayat Cinta	2007	Abimael Gandy	Rossa
Takdir Cinta	2008	Abimael Gandy	Rossa
Tercipta Untukku (feat. Ungu)	2008	Abimael Gandy	Rossa & Ungu
Takkan Berpaling Dari-Mu	2008	Abimael Gandy	Rossa
Terlanjur Cinta (feat. Pasha Ungu)	2008	Abimael Gandy	Rossa & Pasha
Hati Yang Kau Sakiti	2009	Nicholas Nicky	Keith Foo
Tega	2009	Abimael Gandy	Mike Lewis
Hey Ladies	2009	Mutiara Lena	Lucky Perdana
Memeluk Bulan	2010	Abimael Gandy	Christian Sugiono
Ku Menunggu	2010	Hedy Suryawan	Gista Putri & Aditya Firmansyah
Ku Pinang Kau Dengan Bismillah (feat. Ungu)	2011	Sakti Marendra	Dallas Pratama
Jangan Ada Dusta Diantara Kita (feat. Broery Marantika)	2011	Abimael Gandy	Rossa & Broery Marantika
Tak Sanggup Lagi	2012	Oleg Sanchabakhtiar	Rossa
One Night Lover (feat. Joe Flizzow)	2012	Oleg Sanchabakhtiar	-
Aku Bersahaja (feat. Taufik Batisah)	2012	Upie Guava	Rossa & Taufik Batisah
Syukur	2013	Hestu Saputra	Rossa
Salahkah (feat. Hafiz Suip)	2013	Upie Guava	Rossa & Hafiz Suip
Hijrah Cinta - Single Version	2014	Hestu Saputra	Rossa
Hijrah Cinta - Album Version	2014	Candi Soeleman	Rossa
Jatuh Cinta Setiap Hari	2015	Oriflame Indonesia	Rossa
Kamu Yang Kutunggu (feat. Afgan)	2015	Sakti Marendra	-
Kebebasan (feat. All Artist)	2015	Yonder Musik Indonesia	Rossa & All Artists
Jangan Hilangkan Dia	2016	Candi Soeleman	Chicco Jerikho
Satu Indonesiaku (feat. All Artist)	2016	-	Rossa & All Artists
Body Speak	2017	Sakti Marendra	Rossa
Cinta Dalam Hidupku	2017	Candi Soeleman	Rizky Nazar
Bukan Maksudku	2017	Sakti Marendra	Miller Khan
Firefly	2017	Katinka Pulungan	Aibek
Bulan Dikekang Malam	2017	Candi Soeleman	Rossa
Bright As The Sun (feat. All Artist)	2018	-	Rossa & All Artists
Pernah Memiliki (feat. D'Masiv & David Noah)	2018	Upie Guava	Rossa, D'Masiv & David Noah
Cahaya Dalam Sunyi (feat. All Artist)	2018	QuranID Project	Rossa & All Artists
Bright As The Sun (feat. All Artist)	2018	-	Rossa & All Artists
Hara (feat. All Artist)	2018	Rio Motret	Rossa & All Artists
Sampah Sayang (feat. Titiek Puspa & All Artist)	2018	-	Rossa & All Artists
Karena Cinta Yang Menemani	2019	Upie Guava	Rossa
Tegar 2.0	2019	Yolando Siahaya	Rossa
Masih - Soundtrack Version	2020	Yolando Siahaya	Rossa
Masih - Album Version	2020	Ivan Saputra Alam	Ki Do-hoon
The Heart You Hurt (Hati Yang Kau Sakiti - Korean Version)	2021	Ivan Saputra Alam	Lee Donghae & Dion Wiyoko
Indonesia Bersatu (feat. All Artist)	2021	-	Rossa & All Artists
Wanita	2021	Ivan Saputra Alam	Rio Dewanto
Zambrud Khatulistiwa (feat. All Artist)	2021	Resso Indonesia	Rossa & All Artists
Terlalu Berharap	2021	Candi Soeleman	Rizky Nazar, Beby Tsabina & Vladimir Rama
Sekali Ini Saja	2022	Raditya Bramanta	Nicholas Saputra
Bawalah Aku Pergi	2023	Yolando Siahaya	Rossa
Intro	2023	Inspire Music	Rossa
Lupakan Cinta	2023	Tepan Kobain & Monty Tiwa	Vladimir Rama
Khanti	2023	Rossa & Mutiara Lena	Rossa
Bertengkar Manis (feat. Barsena Bestandhi)	2023	Prialangga	Omar Daniel & Anna Jobling
Kau (feat. Boy William)	2023	Ivan Saputra Alam	Rossa & Boy William
Aku Baik Saja	2025	Paragon Pictures	Rossa
Sinaran (feat. MK K-Clique)	2025	Gilbert March	Rossa & MK K-Clique

== Music video appearances ==
Title	Year	Production	Detail
Nostalgia SMA	2006	Royal Prima Musikindo	Cameo in Music Video Yuni Shara
50 Tahun Lagi	2011	Royal Prima Musikindo	Cameo in Music Video Yuni Shara & Raffi Ahmad
Syukur	2014	Trinity Optima Production	Cameo in Music Video Ungu
Pesta	2022	MOP Channel	Cameo in Music Video Peto Putra Onsu
Khanti	2023	Inspire Music	Director in Music Video Khanti

== Songs by Rossa covered by cross-generational singers ==
Title	Year	Singer	Detail
Tegar	2007	Marsha "Indonesian Idol"	The original version was recorded by Rossa in 1999 for the album Tegar.
Pudar	2011	D'Langit	The original version was recorded by Rossa in 2004 for the album Kembali.
Aku Bukan Untukmu	2011	Jikustik	The original version was recorded by Rossa in 2004 for the album Kembali.
Perawan Cinta	2013	Cindy Bernadette	The original version was recorded by Rossa in 2002 for the album Kini.
Kini	2013	Marcell Siahaan	The original version was recorded by Rossa in 2002 for the album Kini.
Tegar	2013	The Siblings	Versi asli direkam oleh Rossa tahun 1999 untuk album Tegar
Terlalu Cinta	2013	Titi DJ	The original version was recorded by Rossa in 2006 for the album Yang Terpilih.
Ayat-Ayat Cinta	2016	Dangdut Saweran	The original version was recorded by Rossa in 2007 for the album Ayat-Ayat Cinta.
Tegar 2.0	2019	Rossa	Originally released in 1999, this version was remade in an upbeat style to celebrate the 20th anniversary of the Tegar album and the Tegar 2.0 concert tour.
Sangcheo Badeun Maeum / The Heart You Hurt / Hati Yang Kau Sakiti (Korean Version)	2020	Rossa	Re-recorded by Rossa. Originally released in 2009 for the album Rossa (Self-Titled), this version was re-recorded in Korean.
Hati Yang Kau Sakiti	2021	Safira Inema	The original version was recorded by Rossa in 2009 for the album Rossa (Self-Titled).
Atas Nama Cinta	2021	Tissa Biani	The original version was recorded by Rossa in 2006 for the album Yang Terpilih.
Hati Yang Kau Sakiti	2021	Yeni Inka	The original version was recorded by Rossa in 2009 for the album Rossa (Self-Titled).
Nada-Nada Cinta	2022	Yesa Lona	The original version was recorded by Rossa in 1996 for the album Nada-Nada Cinta.
Atas Nama Cinta	2022	Gonebloom	The original version was recorded by Rossa in 2006 for the album Yang Terpilih.
Terlalu Cinta	2022	Gonebloom	The original version was recorded by Rossa in 2006 for the album Yang Terpilih.
Ayat-Ayat Cinta	2022	Gonebloom	The original version was recorded by Rossa in 2007 for the album Ayat-Ayat Cinta.
Ayat-Ayat Cinta	2022	Putih Abu-Abu	The original version was recorded by Rossa in 2007 for the album Ayat-Ayat Cinta.
Aku Bukan Untukmu	2022	Gonebloom	The original version was recorded by Rossa in 2004 for the album Kembali.
Hati Yang Terpilih	2022	Gan Gan Wigandi	The original version was recorded by Rossa in 2009 for the album Rossa (Self-Titled).
Tegar	2022	Langit Jiwa	The original version was recorded by Rossa in 1999 for the album Tegar.
Atas Nama Cinta	2022	Fadhila Intan	The original version was recorded by Rossa in 2006 for the album Yang Terpilih.
Masih	2022	Avia Athalia	The original version was recorded by Rossa in 2020.
Tegar	2022	Fadhila Intan	The original version was recorded by Rossa in 1999 for the album Tegar.
Hati Yang Terpilih	2022	Fadhila Intan	The original version was recorded by Rossa in 2000 for the album Hati Yang Terpilih.
Ayat-Ayat Cinta	2022	Michela Thea	The original version was recorded by Rossa in 2007 for the albumm Ayat-Ayat Cinta.
Hey Ladies	2022	Michela Thea	The original version was recorded by Rossa in 2009 for the album Rossa (Self-Titled).
Ayat-Ayat Cinta	2022	Nabila Maharani	The original version was recorded by Rossa in 2007 for the album Ayat-Ayat Cinta.
Aku Bukan Untukmu	2023	Jikustik	The original version was recorded by Rossa in 2004 for the album Kembali.
Jangan Hilangkan Dia	2023	Mario G. Klau	The original version was recorded by Rossa in 2017 for the album A New Chapter.
Hati Yang Kau Sakiti	2023	Lissa	The original version was recorded by Rossa in 1996 for the album Rossa (Self-Titled).
Jangan Hilangkan Dia	2023	Scalava Coustic	The original version was recorded by Rossa in 2017 for the album A New Chapter.
Hey Ladies	2023	Avoila	The original version was recorded by Rossa in 2009 for the album Rossa (Self-Titled).
Jangan Hilangkan Dia	2023	Nabila Maharani	The original version was recorded by Rossa in 2017 for the album A New Chapter.
Terlalu Cinta	2024	Yovie Widianto & Lyodra	The original version was recorded by Rossa in 2006 for the album Yang Terpilih.
Takkan Berpaling Dari-Mu	2024	Debora Hanna	The original version was recorded by Rossa in 2009 for the album Rossa (Self-Titled).
Takdir Cinta	2024	Tito Munandar	The original version was recorded by Rossa in 2007 for the album Ayat-Ayat Cinta.
Hati Yang Kau Sakiti	2024	Ungu	Versi asli direkam oleh Rossa tahun 2009 untuk album Rossa (Self-Titled)
Hijrah Cinta	2024	Tito Munandar	The original version was recorded by Rossa in 2014 for the album Love, Life & Music.
Nada-Nada Cinta	2024	Rossa & Ariel NOAH	Re-recorded by Rossa & Ariel NOAH for the documentary film All Access To Rossa: 25 Shining Years.
Tega	2025	Jikustik	The original version was recorded by Rossa in 2009 for the album Rossa (Self-Titled).
Aku Bukan Untukmu	2025	Anggi Marito	The original version was recorded by Rossa in 2004 for the album Kembali.
Takkan Berpaling Dari-Mu	2025	Jikustik	The original version was recorded by Rossa in 2009 for the album Rossa (Self-Titled).
Tercipta Untukku	2025	Pagi Nyanyi	The original version was recorded by Rossa in 2002 for the album Kini.
Tegar	2025	Tissa Biani & Sita Nursanti	The original version was recorded by Rossa in 1999 for the album Tegar.
Kini	2026	Yovie Widianto, K.I.M & Neida	The original version was recorded by Rossa in 2002 for the album Kini.

== Awards and Certifications ==
Several of Rossa’s albums and singles have received Multi-Platinum and Million Awards certifications from the Indonesian Recording Industry Association (ASIRI), as well as breaking sales records in Indonesia and Southeast Asia.
