= Hari yang Cerah (Noah album) =

Hari Yang Cerah

Studio album (re-recorded) by Noah
- Released: January 26, 2022
- Recorded: 2015–2021
- Genre: Pop rock, alternative rock, electronic rock, industrial rock
- Length: 39:04
- Label: Musica Studios Indonesia

Noah chronology
Bintang di Surga (2022)	Hari Yang Cerah (2022)

Singles from Hari yang Cerah
- 1. "Menghapus Jejakmu" Released: 21 Januari 2022; 2. "Kota Mati" Released: 29 Agustus 2022

Hari yang Cerah is a re-recorded album by the Indonesian rok music group Noah from the Peterpan album which was released in 2007 with the same name . This album is the fourth re-recorded album by Noah and was released on January 26, 2022, through Musica Studio's. This album is the final release from the "Second Chance" quadrilogy project, where Noah re-recorded all their songs when they were still called Peterpan. The song Cobalah Mengerti was used as the soundtrack for the soap opera Aku Jatuh Cinta which was aired on RCTI in 2022.

== Release and promotion ==
When Noah published the album Second Chance, RM. Adji Srihandoyodari from Trans Retail said that Second Chance was the first of four albums and would be followed by Noah's version of Taman Langit, Bintang di Surga, and Hari yang Cerah. Musica Studio's director, Indrawati Widjaja, said that the publication would be gradual throughout 2015. However, on December 3, 2015, Ariel said that the three albums, including Noah's version of Hari yang Cerah..., had not been completed. On December 12, 2021, when announcing that the Noah's version of Taman Langit would be released, Noah said that other Peterpan albums, including Hari yang Cerah..., would be released in 2022.

Before releasing the album, Noah released the song "Menghapus Jejakmu" as a single and released the video clip on January 21, 2022. The album Hari yang Cerah was then released digitally on January 26, 2022.

== Track listing ==
No.	Title	Lyrics	Music	Length
1.	"Menghapus Jejakmu" (bersama Rejoz The Groove)	Ariel; Eross Candra	Ariel	3:02
2.	"Hari yang Cerah Untuk Jiwa yang Sepi"	Ariel	Lukman; Ariel	3:59
3.	"Di Balik Awan"	Ariel	Ariel	3:57
4.	"Kota Mati"	Ariel	Lukman; Ariel	4:31
5.	"Melawan Dunia"	Ariel	Ariel	3:19
6.	"Sally Sendiri"	Ariel	Ariel	4:52
7.	"Lihat Langkahku"	Lukman	Lukman	4:07
8.	"Bebas"	Ariel	Ariel	3:10
9.	"Cobalah Mengerti"	Ariel	Lukman; Ariel	4:35
10.	"Dunia yang Terlupa"	Lukman	Lukman	3:32
Total length:				39:04

== Personnel ==
Credits for additional musicians and production personnel are adapted from the album's liner notes.

NOAH

- Ariel – vocal
- Lukman – main guitar
- Uki – guitar, audio engineer
- David – keyboards, piano, synthesizer
- Reza – drum percussion

Additional Musicians

- Boyi Tondo - bass guitar
- Lanlan – bass guitar
- Iwan Sukma - guitar audio engineer
- Rio Alief – drums, beat loops and synthesizer
- Henry Lamiri – string
- Rejos The Groove - percussion on track 1

Production

- Moko Aguswan – audio mixing
- Arief Renaldi – audio mixing
- Sadat Effendy – audio mixing
- Josep Manurung – audio engineer
- Horas Pinem – audio engineer
- Toni Hawaii – audio mastering
- Gita Roni – Pro Tools editor
- Crimson Merry – Pro Tools editor
- Teddy Riadi – sound supervisor

Artwork

- Edelweiss line – cover design
- Aditya Dwi Prasetya – creative and design supervisor
- Sehan Idruz – design and pre-production
