= Bintang di Surga (Noah album) =

Studio album (re-recorded) by Noah
- Released: January 12, 2022
- Recorded: 2015–2021
- Genre: Alternative rock, pop rock, electronic rock
- Length: 36:15
- Label: Musica Studios
- Producer: Noey, Capung

Noah chronology
Taman Langit (2021)	Bintang di Surga (2022)	Hari yang Cerah (2022)

Singles from Bintang di Surga
- 1. "Bintang di Surga" Released: January 7, 2022

Bintang di Surga is a re-recorded album by the Indonesian rock music group Noah from Peterpan album which was released with the same name in 2004. This album is the third re-recorded album by Noah and was released on January 12, 2022, through Musica Studios. This album is the third release from the "Second Chance" quadrilogy project, where Noah re-recorded all their songs when they were still called Peterpan.

This album consists of 8 songs from the Peterpan version of the album Bintang Di Surga. Two songs from the Peterpan album, "Aku" and "Masa Lalu Tertinggal", were not included in the new album version. According to Noah fans, this happened because the songs were written by Peterpan personnel who had previously left in 2006, namely Andika (keyboard) and Indra (bass guitar). Meanwhile, Andika said that he had no problem if the song was included and that it was all Noah's decision.

== Release and promotion ==
When Noah published the album Second Chance, RM. Adji Srihandoyodari from Trans Retail said that Second Chance is the first of four albums and will be followed by Noah's version of Taman Langit, Bintang di Surga, and Hari yang Cerah. Musica Studio's director, Indrawati Widjaja, said that the publication would be gradual throughout 2015. However, on December 3, 2015, Ariel said that the three albums, including Noah's version of "Bintang Di Surga", had not been completed. On December 12, 2021, when announcing that the Noah's version of Taman Langit would be released, Noah said that Peterpan's other albums, including Bintang di Surga, would be released in 2022.

Before releasing the album, Noah released the song "Bintang di Surga" as a single and released the video clip on January 7, 2022. Noah's version of the album Bintang di Surga was then released on digital music platforms on January 12, 2022.

To support the album launch, Noah held a concert entitled Bintang di Surga on January 29, 2022, at the Tentrem Hotel, Yogyakarta. Tickets sold for the concert sold out within an hour. Eight of the fifteen songs that Noah performed at the concert came from this album.

== Track listing ==
All songs written by Ariel.

No.	Title	Length
1.	"Ada Apa Denganmu"	4:43
2.	"Mungkin Nanti"	4:29
3.	"Khayalan Tingkat Tinggi"	3:24
4.	"Di Belakangku"	5:02
5.	"Ku Katakan Dengan Indah"	6:11
6.	"Tetap Berdiri (2DSD)"	3:47
7.	"Diatas Normal"	3:38
8.	"Bintang di Surga"	5:01
Total length:		36:15

== Personnel ==
Credits of additional musicians and production personnel adapted from the album's liner notes.

NOAH

- Ariel – vocal
- Lukman – lead guitar
- Uki – guitar, audio engineer
- David – keyboards, piano, synthesizer
- Reza – drum percussion

Additional Musicians

- Boyi Tondo - bass guitar
- Lanlan – bass guitar
- Iwan Sukma - guitar audio engineer
- Rio Alief – drums, beat loops and synthesizer
- Henry Lamiri – string
- Dimas Mufli Utomo – loop beats and synthesizer
- Ricky Johanes – loop beats and synthesizer
- Maizura – backing vocals on track 5

Production

- Moko Aguswan – audio mixing
- Arief Renaldi – audio mixing
- Sadat Effendy – audio mixing
- Josep Manurung – audio engineer
- Horas Pinem – audio engineer
- Toni Hawaii – audio mastering
- Gita Roni – Pro Tools editor
- Crimson Merry – Pro Tools editor
- Teddy Riadi – sound supervisor

Artwork

- Edelweiss line – cover design
- Aditya Dwi Prasetya – creative and design supervisor
- Sehan Idruz – design and pre-production
