= Menghapus Jejakmu =

2007 song by Peterpan

Single by Peterpan

from the album Hari yang Cerah
- Released: 2007
- Length: 3:04
- Label: Musica Studio's
- Composer(s): Ariel
- Lyricist(s): Ariel; Eross Candra (originally not credited)
- Producer(s): Capunk, Noey, Icom

Peterpan singles chronology
"Membebaniku" (2006)	"Menghapus Jejakmu" (2007)	"Di Balik Awan" (2007)

Music video
- "Menghapus Jejakmu" on YouTube

"Menghapus Jejakmu" (English: "Erasing Your Footsteps") is a song by Indonesian rock band Peterpan. It was written by the band's vocalist, Ariel, with lyrics by Ariel and Sheila on 7 guitarist Eross Candra, who were not credited due to recording label difference until the release of the Noah version in 2022. It was recorded for Peterpan's third studio album Hari yang Cerah (2007), with Capunk and Noey of Java Jive and Icom of Marvells as the producers. It was released as the album's lead single and its music video has been remade and referenced after Peterpan changed their name to Noah.

Ariel wrote the song for Hari yang Cerah, but the band found it unfitting for them and offered it to Indonesian singer Bunga Citra Lestari. However, due to Ariel's request to be excluded from the songwriting credits, Bunga Citra Lestari rejected it and Peterpan eventually included "Menghapus Jejakmu" in the album. In 2019, Bunga Citra Lestari released a re-arranged version of the song with Ariel.

== Production ==
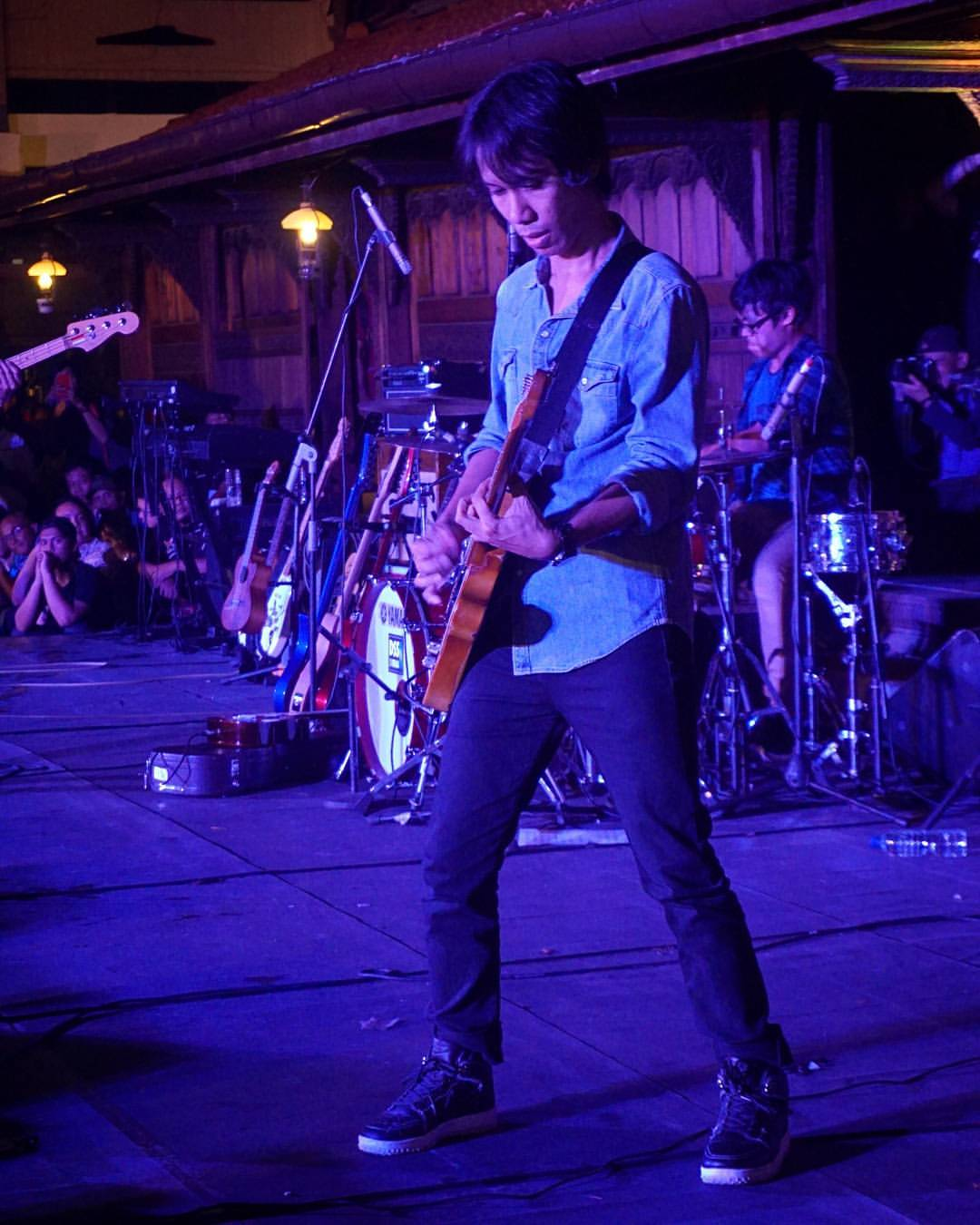
Eross Candra helped wrote the lyrics for "Menghapus Jejakmu".

Peterpan's vocalist, Ariel wrote "Menghapus Jejakmu" for their third studio album Hari yang Cerah. After composing the song's arrangement, Peterpan found the result unfitting for their genre and decided to exclude it from the album. After the decision was made, Ariel planned to give the song to Indonesian singer Bunga Citra Lestari.

Because the lyrics had not been finished yet and Ariel was busy working on the album, Ariel asked Sheila on 7 guitarist Eross Candra to wrote the lyrics. Eross received the demo from Ariel along with instructions about the song having "walking" feeling. Based on the theme, Eross wrote lyrics about "burying" or "erasing" footsteps, and Ariel later finished the lyrics.

After the lyrics was finished, Ariel offered the song to Bunga Citra Lestari and told her to credit herself as the songwriter instead of him. Bunga Citra Lestari refused to do so and thus rejected the song. Additionally, her producer considered the song still feels like a Peterpan song. Because of the rejection and the incoming deadline for Hari yang Cerah, Peterpan re-added "Menghapus Jejakmu" to the album.

== Songwriting credits ==
After it was decided to make "Menghapus Jejakmu" a Peterpan song, Eross requested to the head of Musica Studio's, Indrawati Widjaja, for his name to not be included as the song's writer because his recording label at the time was competing with Musica Studio's. Accordingly, when "Menghapus Jejakmu" was first released, Eross wasn't credited as the songwriter. He only received the songwriting credit after he left the label.

== Music video ==
The music video for "Menghapus Jejakmu" was diredcted Sim F. The video featured Ariel and a woman (played by Indonesian actress Dian Sastrowardoyo) who mimicked Ariel's moves. The video was released in 2007, and was later uploaded to Musica Studio's YouTube channel on 11 July 2012.

During Noah's project to re-record their songs that were released under the Peterpan name, they released a music video for "Khayalan Tingkat Tinggi" and made it a sequel to Peterpan's "Menghapus Jejakmu" video. Ariel and Dian reprised their role from the video, but the situation of their characters are reversed; now, Dian's character is the one who is trying to leave Ariel behind.

== Awards and nominations ==
"Menghapus Jejakmu" was nominated for Most Popular Song in an award show for Malay-language songs, Anugerah Planet Muzik 2008.

== Bunga Citra Lestari version ==
"Menghapus Jejakmu"

Single by Bunga Citra Lestari and Ariel Noah
- Released: March 13, 2020
- Genre: Pop
- Length: 3:34
- Label: Musica Studio's
- Songwriter(s): Ariel
- Producer(s): Ariel Noah; Bunga Citra Lestari

Bunga Citra Lestari singles chronology
"Memilih Dia" (2019)	"Menghapus Jejakmu" (2020)	"12 Tahun Terindah" (2020)

Ariel Noah singles chronology
"もしもまたいつか - Moshimo Mata Itsuka (Mungkin Nanti)" (2019)	"Menghapus Jejakmu" (2020)	"Bukannya Aku Takut" (2020)

Music video
- "Menghapus Jejakmu" on YouTube

"Menghapus Jejakmu" was re-arranged and released as a single by Bunga Citra Lestari and Ariel in 2020. The production was started around mid-2019. The song was given softer arrangement with acoustic guitar as the dominant instrument.

This version of "Menghapus Jejakmu" was introduced in a studio session video uploaded on Bunga Citra Lestari's YouTube channel on 14 February 2020. Later on 13 March, the song was released as a single in digital music services. This version was nominated for Best Collaboration Production Work in Anugerah Musik Indonesia 2020.

Personnel

Based on the description for Bunga Citra Lestari's studio session video uploaded on YouTube:

- Bunga Citra Lestari – vocals
- Ariel Noah – vocals
- Yankjay – guitar
- Rio Alief – drums
- Lanlan – bass guitar

== Noah version ==
"Menghapus Jejakmu"

Single by Noah featuring Rejoz the Groove

from the album Hari yang Cerah
- Released: January 21, 2022
- Length: 3:02
- Label: Musica Studio's
- Composer(s): Ariel
- Lyricist(s): Ariel; Eross Candra
- Producer(s): Noah, Capung

Noah singles chronology
"Bintang di Surga" (2022)	"Menghapus Jejakmu" (2022)	"Di Atas Normal" (2022)

Music video
- "Menghapus Jejakmu" on YouTube

After Peterpan changed their name to Noah, they re-recorded their songs from the Peterpan era. Noah also remade some of the music video for the songs. On 18 January 2022, Noah shared a teaser for their "Menghapus Jejakmu" music video remake via their TikTok account. Noah released the re-recorded version of "Menghapus Jejakmu" as a single on 21 January 2022, and the music video on YouTube at the same day. The video featured Angga Yunanda portraying Ariel's role in the original video and Vanesha Prescilla as the possessive woman who mimicked Angga's moves.

=== Personnel ===
Based on the description for the music video uploaded on YouTube.

Noah

- Ariel – vocals
- Lukman – guitar
- Uki – guitar, audio engineer
- David – keyboards
- Reza – drums

Additional musicians

- Boyi Tondo – bass guitar
- Rejoz the Groove – percussion

Production

- Crimson Merry – digital editor
- Moko Aguswan – audio mixing
- Toni Hawaii – audio mastering
