= Taman Langit (Noah album) =

Studio album (re-recorded) by Noah
- Released: December 17, 2021
- Recorded: 2015–2021
- Genre: Pop rock, alternative rock, grunge
- Length: 43:55
- Label: Musica Studios
- Producer: Capung, Noey

Noah chronology
Keterkaitan Keterikatan – Acoustic Version in 360° (2021)	Taman Langit (2021)	Bintang di Surga (2022)

Singles from Taman Langit
- 1. "Yang Terdalam" Released: December 17, 2021; 2. "Semua Tentang Kita" Released: August 2, 2023

Taman Langit is the second re-recorded album by the Indonesian rock band Noah. It is a re-recording of their first album Taman Langit, which was released in 2003 when they were named Peterpan, and is the second album in Noah's project to re-record their songs from the Peterpan era. This album was released on December 17, 2021, via Musica Studio's on digital music portals and in CD format. To support the launch of the album, Noah made a music video for the album version of the song "Yang Terdalam" with the same concept, but different actors, as the video that Peterpan previously made for the song.

== Background ==
Taman Langit is Peterpan's first studio album which was released in 2003. In 2012, Peterpan changed their name to Noah. Because they had changed their name, Noah wanted to re-record the songs their songs from the Peterpan era. The reasons include that Noah wants the masters of their old songs to be under Noah's name and wants to make their initial wishes come true when recording which can only be realized now that Noah has enough experience in terms of recording music.

== Recording ==
On March 3, 2015, Noah's vocalist, Ariel announced on his social media that they were working on Noah's version of Taman Langit album and shared a snippet of the song "Semua Tentang Kita" which is being re-arranged.

== Music ==
Ariel said that although all the songs were re-recorded, not all of them were re-arranged in the new version of Taman Langit. The reason is because there are several songs whose melodies are considered iconic, such as the guitar melody of the song "Semua Tentang Kita". Ariel's voice, which is now heavier, is also a consideration in determining whether the song's vocals need to be rearranged or not. According to Ariel, the sound of the recording of the album Taman Langit is very different from the 2003 version.

== Release and promotion ==
When Noah published the album Second Chance, RM. Adji Srihandoyodari from Trans Retail said that Second Chance is the first of four albums and will be followed by Noah's versions of Taman Langit, Bintang di Surga, and Hari yang Cerah Musica Studio's director, Indrawati Widjaja, said that the following albums would be released gradually throughout 2015. However, on December 3, 2015, Ariel said that the three albums, including Noah's version of Taman Langit, had not been completed.

On December 12, 2021, Noah announced that they would release a re-recorded version of Taman Langit. On the same day, Noah performed an exclusive concert at Hutan Kota by Plataran, Central Jakarta to promote the album.

Noah's version of Taman Langit was released on December 17, 2021, on digital music services and in CD format. To support it, Noah released a music video for their version of the song "Yang Terdalam" on the same day. In the new music video, Iqbaal Ramadhan walks past several traders on the side of the road like Ariel did in the Peterpan version of the video.

== Accolades ==
At Anugerah Musik Indonesia 2022, Taman Langit received nominations for the awards Best of the Best Album and Best Pop Album.

== Track listing ==
All tracks are written by Ariel, except "Sahabat" by Ariel, Uki, and Lukman with lyrics from Ariel and "Kita Tertawa" by Lukman with lyrics from Ariel.

No.	Title	Length
1.	"Sahabat"	4:34
2.	"Aku & Bintang"	3:49
3.	"Semua Tentang Kita"	4:29
4.	"Dan Hilang"	3:59
5.	"Satu Hati"	3:49
6.	"Mimpi yang Sempurna"	3:37
7.	"Taman Langit"	3:29
8.	"Yang Terdalam"	3:19
9.	"Tertinggalkan Waktu"	4:05
10.	"Kita Tertawa"	3:22
11.	"Topeng"	4:23
Total length:		43:55

== Personnel ==
Additional musicians and production personnel credits are adapted from the album's liner notes.

Noah

- Ariel – vocal
- David – keyboards, piano, synthesizer
- Lukman – lead guitar
- Reza – drum percussion
- Uki – guitar, audio engineer

Additional musicians

- Boyi Tondo – bass guitar
- Lanlan – bass guitar
- Rio Alief – percussion drum
- Henry Lamiri – string instruments
- Sophia Latjuba – backing vocals on tracks 6 & 8

Production

- Moko Aguswan – audio mixing
- Arief Renaldi – audio mixing
- Sadat Effendy – audio mixing
- Josep Manurung – audio engineer
- Horas Pinem – audio engineer
- Toni Hawaii – audio mastering
- Gita Roni – Pro Tools editor
- Crimson Merry – Pro Tools editor
- Teddy Riadi – sound supervisor

Artwork

- Garis Edelweiss – cover designer
- Aditya Dwi Prasetya – creative and design supervisor
- Sehan Idruz – design and pre-production
