= Suara Lainnya =

Studio album by Ariel, Uki, Lukman, Reza, David
- Released: 29 May 2012
- Recorded: 2011 – 2012
- Studio: Masterplan Recording Chamber; David Personal Studio; Lapas Kebon Waru, Bandung (vocals for "Dara")
- Genre: Instrumental; orchestra; jazz; pop
- Length: 45:07
- Label: Musica Studio's

Ariel, Uki, Lukman, Reza, David chronology
Sebuah Nama, Sebuah Cerita (2009)	Suara Lainnya (2012)	Seperti Seharusnya (2012)

Singles from Suara Lainnya
- 1. "Cobalah Mengerti" Released: 12 June 2012; 2. "Sahabat" Released: 22 October 2013

Suara Lainnya is an album by Ariel, Uki, Lukman, Reza, David, (Note: Credited under Noah name now.) their first album after they stopped using Peterpan name. The album consists of instrumental version of their songs from their Peterpan era. It was released on 29 May 2012 on the Musica Studio's label.

== Background ==
In 2009, Peterpan abandoned their band name to fulfill their agreement with Andika and Indra, who had been dismissed from the band in 2006. Afterwards, they performed using the band member's names: Ariel, Uki, Lukman, Reza and David. Their plan to announce their new band name was delayed because Ariel was arrested in 2010 due to a celebrity sex tape scandal.

To regain their popularity, Ariel, Uki, Lukman, Reza and David recorded an instrumental album titled Suara Lainnya. The album was instrumental because they did not want to replace Ariel with another vocalist. Their original idea was to replace the vocals with piano. But because they wanted to expand their musical exploration, they decided to add other instruments.

== Recording ==
According to David, Suara Lainnya took six months to make. During the recording, the band tried out instruments they had not explored before, such as karinding, violin and piano. So that Ariel can contribute, his bandmates regularly visited him in Kebon Waru prison. In this album, the band collaborated with Geisha's vocalist Momo, violinists Idris Sardi and Hendri Lamiri, and karinding band Karinding Attack. Karinding Attack's blog wrote that they recorded their songs in late December 2011.

== Songs ==
Suara Lainnya consists of 10 rearrangement of Peterpan's songs, and one bonus song, "Dara", Ariel's 2011 solo single. According to Uki, the songs in the album have varying genres, such as jazz, fusion, orchestra, and traditional music."

Among the rearanged songs, only "Cobalah Mengerti" has vocals, recorded by Momo of Geisha. Momo's vocals was chosen because its "color" was considered to fit the best. The tempo of "Cobalah Mengerti" in this album is slower than the original version's.

In this album, "Sahabat", originally a pop rock song, was recorded with Karinding Attack which gives the song Sundanese music feel. "Di Belakangku" which was also recorded with Karinding Attack has the same feel too.

For "Taman Langit", the only instruments used were piano and violin family.

== Release and promotion ==
On 14 May 2012, the band announced their plan to release Suara Lainnya. As planned, Suara Lainnya was released on 29 May 2012 in a concert titled Konser Tanpa Nama (English: Concert Without Name). At the concert, Uki, Lukman, Reza, and David performed the songs from the album without Ariel. The concert also featured musicians who participated in Suara Lainnya.

== Tracklist ==
No.	Title	Writer(s)	Length
1.	"Diatas Normal"	Ariel	3:05
2.	"Cobalah Mengerti" (feat. Momo of Geisha)	Ariel; Lukman	5:04
3.	"Kota Mati"	Ariel; Lukman	4:52
4.	"Sahabat" (feat. Karinding Attack)	Ariel; Uki; Lukman	3:58
5.	"Walau Habis Terang"	Ariel	4:12
6.	"Di Belakangku" (feat. Karinding Attack)	Ariel	3:42
7.	"Melawan Dunia"	Ariel	4:40
8.	"Langit Tak Mendengar"	Ariel; Lukman	4:11
9.	"Taman Langit"	Ariel	4:16
10.	"Bintang di Surga"	Ariel	3:47
11.	"Dara" (bonus track)	Ariel	3:16
Total length:			45:07

== Personnel ==
Credits for additional musician and production personnel is adapted from the album's liner notes.

Ariel, Uki, Lukman, Reza, David

- Ariel – vocals on "Dara"
- David – keyboard, piano, string
- Lukman – guitar
- Reza – drum, percussion
- Uki – guitar

Additional musician

- Ihsan Nurrachman – bass guitar
- Zein – brass on "Diatas Normal"
- Momo of Geisha – vocals on "Cobalah Mengerti"
- Robi of Geisha – vocals on "Cobalah Mengerti"
- Henry Lamiri – string on "Cobalah Mengerti", cello on "Taman Langit"
- Karinding Attack – karinding on "Sahabat" and "Di Belakangku"
- Idris Sardi – violin solo and string orchestration on "Taman Langit"

Production personnel

- Teddy Riadi – a&r
- Faisal – vocals recording on "Dara"
- Horas – vocals recording on "Cobalah Mengerti"
- Mahdi – vocals recording on "Cobalah Mengerti"
- Arief R – mixing on "Diatas Normal", "Kota Mati", "Sahabat" and "Bintang di Surga"
- Simon – mixing on "Walau Habis Terang", "Di Belakangku" and "Dara"
- Deni Lisapali – mixing on "Melawan Dunia" and "Langit Tak Mendengar"
- Toni Hawaii – mixing on "Cobalah Mengerti" and "Taman Langit"
