= List of awards and nominations received by Bunga Citra Lestari =

Bunga Citra Lestari awards and nominations
Awards and nominations
| Award | Wins | Nominations |
| Anugerah Musik Indonesia | 6 | 21 |
| Anugerah Planet Muzik | 2 | 13 |
| Indonesian Movie Awards | 1 | 5 |
| Infotainment Awards | 1 | 6 |
| Nickelodeon Indonesia Kids' Choice Awards | 1 | 9 |
| Rolling Stone Editors' Choice Awards | 1 | 1 |
| SCTV Music Awards | 1 | 3 |
| Selebrita Awards | 1 | 2 |
| Yahoo! OMG Awards | 1 | 4 |

Totals (Note: Certain award groups do not simply award one winner. They acknowledge several different recipients, have runners-up, and have third place. Since this is a specific recognition and is different from losing an award, runner-up mentions are considered wins in this award tally. For simplification and to avoid errors, each award in this list has been presumed to have had a prior nomination.)
- Wins: 29
- Nominations: 125

Bunga Citra Lestari, also known as BCL, is an Indonesian pop singer and actress. Her debut album, Cinta Pertama, was released in 2006 with the hit singles, "Cinta Pertama" and "Aku Tak Mau Sendiri". Her first album was a success and sold out 75,000 copies in the first week in Indonesia. This album raised up her name as a famous singer.

In 2008, she released her second studio album, Tentang Kamu. The album produced her successful single, "Tentang Kamu" and "Pernah Muda". The single "Tentang Kamu" get nominations "Best Pop Female Solo Artist" at the 2009 Anugerah Musik Indonesia.

This is a list of awards received by Bunga Citra Lestari:

== Anugerah Industri Muzik ==
The Anugerah Industri Muzik (English translation: Music Industry Awards), commonly known by the acronym AIM, are the award ceremony to honour the Malaysian music industry, first held in 1993. It is Malaysia's equivalent of the Grammy Awards.

| Year | Nominee / work | Award | Result | Ref. |
|---|---|---|---|---|
| 2008 | "Aku Dan Dirimu" (feat. Ari Lasso) | Best Malay Song Performance by Foreign Artist | Nominated | |

== Anugerah Musik Indonesia ==
The Anugerah Musik Indonesia (English translation: Indonesian Music Awards), is an annual Indonesian major music awards. They have been compared to the American Grammy Awards and British Brit Awards. The award was formalized in 1997 by ASIRI (Association of Indonesia Recording Industry), PAPPRI (Association of Indonesian Singers, Songwriters and Music Record Producers), and KCI (Copyright Office of Indonesia). It is the highest music awards given to outstanding artists in Indonesia. Bunga received five awards from 22 nominations.

| Year | Nominee / work | Award | Result | Ref. |
|---|---|---|---|---|
| 2008 | "Aku Tak Mau Sendiri" | Best Pop Female Solo Artist | Nominated | |
| 2008 | "Aku Dan Dirimu" (feat. Ari Lasso) | Best Collaboration Production Work | Won | |
| 2008 | "Aku Dan Dirimu" (feat. Ari Lasso) | Best Pop Duo/Group/Collaboration | Nominated | |
| 2009 | "Tentang Kamu" | Best Pop Female Solo Artist | Nominated | |
| 2010 | "Karena Kucinta Kau" | Best Pop Female Solo Artist | Nominated | |
| 2013 | "Cinta Sejati" | Best Pop Female Solo Artist | Won | |
| 2013 | "Cinta Sejati" | Best Original Soundtrack Film Production Work | Won | |
| 2013 | "Cinta Sejati" | Best of the Best Production Work | Nominated | |
| 2013 | "Hot" (feat. Intan Ayu) | Best Electronic Dance Production Work | Won | |
| 2013 | "Hot" (feat. Intan Ayu) | Best Collaboration Production Work | Nominated | |
| 2014 | "Jangan Gila" | Best Pop Female Solo Artist | Nominated | |
| 2015 | "Kuasa-Mu" | Best Pop Female Solo Artist | Nominated | |
| 2016 | "Aku Bisa Apa" | Best Pop Female Solo Artist | Nominated | |
| 2016 | "Aku Bisa Apa" | Best Original Soundtrack Film Production Work | Won | |
| 2016 | "Aku Bisa Apa" | Best of the Best Production Work | Nominated | |
| 2017 | "Aku Wanita" | Best of the Best Production Work | Nominated | |
| 2017 | "Aku Wanita" | Best Pop Female Solo Artist | Nominated | |
| 2017 | It's Me BCL | Best Pop Album | Nominated | |
| 2017 | It's Me BCL | Best of the Best Album | Nominated | |
| 2019 | "Harta Berharga" | Best Pop Female Solo Artist | Won | |
| 2019 | "Harta Berharga" | Best Original Soundtrack Film Production Work | Nominated | |

== Anugerah Planet Muzik ==
First established in 2001, the Anugerah Planet Muzik (Malay translation: Planet Music Awards), was an annual music awards were organized by several media companies MediaCorp, Suria, Warna 94.2FM and Ria 89.7FM, to honour for artist in 3 countries (Singapore, Malaysia and Indonesia) who to be outstanding achievement in the regional of Malay and Indonesian music industry. Bunga received two awards from 13 nominations.

| Year | Nominee / work | Award | Result | Ref. |
|---|---|---|---|---|
| 2008 | Bunga Citra Lestari | Most Popular Female Artist | Nominated | |
| 2008 | "Aku Tak Mau Sendiri" | Best Artist (Female) | Nominated | |
| 2009 | "Tentang Kamu" | Best Artist (Female) | Won | |
| 2009 | Bunga Citra Lestari | Most Popular Indonesian Artist | Nominated | |
| 2011 | "Karena Ku Cinta Kau" | Best Song (Indonesia) | Nominated | |
| 2013 | "Cinta Sejati" | Best Artist (Female) | Won | |
| 2013 | "Cinta Sejati" | Most Popular Regional Song | Nominated | |
| 2013 | Bunga Citra Lestari | Most Popular Regional Artist | Nominated | |
| 2014 | "Jangan Gila" | Best Song (Indonesia) | Nominated | |
| 2015 | "Wanita Terbahagia" | Best Artist (Female) | Nominated | |
| 2015 | "Wanita Terbahagia" | Best Song (Indonesia) | Nominated | |
| 2015 | "Wanita Terbahagia" | APM Most Popular Song | Nominated | |
| 2015 | Bunga Citra Lestari | Social Media Icon | Nominated | |

== Brand Ambassador Awards ==
The Brand Ambassador Awards are an annual awards ceremony were presented by Lazada and has first established in 2017, based on implemented through a distributed poll on Instagram.

| Year | Nominee / work | Award | Result | Ref. |
|---|---|---|---|---|
| 2017 | Bunga Citra Lestari from Molto | Favorite Brand Ambassador | Nominated | |

== Bright Awards ==
First established in 2016 which work with MNC Media, The Bright Awards are an annual awards for Indonesian advertising which assessed communicative. Bunga has received one award from 3 nominations.

| Year | Nominee / work | Award | Result | Ref. |
|---|---|---|---|---|
| 2016 | Bunga Citra Lestari & Ashraf Sinclair | Favorite Star Advertisement Couple | Nominated | |
| 2017 | Bunga Citra Lestari & Ashraf Sinclair | Favorite Star Advertisement Couple | Nominated | |
| 2017 | Bunga Citra Lestari | The Brightest Star | Won | |

== Dahsyatnya Awards ==
Presented on 2009, the Dahsyatnya Awards are annual awards presented by the daily Indonesian TV show Dahsyat that airs on RCTI, to be awarded for talent artists who become outstanding (Indonesian: Terdahsyat) in music and entertainment.

| Year | Nominee / work | Award | Result | Ref. |
|---|---|---|---|---|
| 2009 | Bunga Citra Lestari | Outstanding Solo Singer | Nominated | |
| 2013 | Bunga Citra Lestari | Outstanding Female Solo Singer | Nominated | |
| 2014 | Bunga Citra Lestari | Outstanding Female Solo Singer | Nominated | |
| 2014 | "Cinta Sejati" | Outstanding Song | Nominated | |
| 2015 | "Kuasa-Mu" | Outstanding Song | Nominated | |
| 2015 | Bunga Citra Lestari | Outstanding Female Solo Singer | Nominated | |
| 2017 | Bunga Citra Lestari | Outstanding Female Solo Singer | Nominated | |
| 2017 | "Mungkin Suatu Hari" | Outstanding Song | Nominated | |
| 2018 | "Aku Wanita" (feat. Dipha Barus) | Outstanding Duo/Collaboration | Nominated | |
| 2018 | Bunga Citra Lestari | Outstanding Female Solo Singer | Nominated | |

== Festival Film Bandung ==
The Festival Film Bandung (Indonesian translation: Bandung Film Festival), was an annual awards ceremony were presented by the Bandung Film Forum community, to honour for artist(s), director and many in film. It has been held regularly since 1987.

| Year | Nominee / work | Award | Result | Ref. |
|---|---|---|---|---|
| 2013 | Berbagi Cinta | The Commendable Female Main Character (Soap Opera) | Nominated | |
| 2013 | Habibie & Ainun | The Commendable Female Main Character (Film) | Nominated | |
| 2016 | Jilbab Traveler: Love Sparks in Korea | The Commendable Female Main Character (Film) | Nominated | |

== Fokus Selebriti Awards ==
The Fokus Selebriti Awards are an awards ceremony were presented by the same-title program, to be awarded for the celebrity who had become hottest, controversial and for achievement in entertainment.

| Year | Nominee / work | Award | Result | Ref. |
|---|---|---|---|---|
| 2013 | Bunga Citra Lestari | Focused Female Celebrity | Nominated | |

== Global Seru Awards ==
The Global Seru Awards are awarded to celebrities who have caught the attention of the public through interesting or exciting accomplishments.

| Year | Nominee / work | Award | Result | Ref. |
|---|---|---|---|---|
| 2015 | Bunga Citra Lestari | Most Exciting Social Media Artist | Nominated | |

== Grazia Glitz & Glam Awards ==
The Grazia Glitz & Glam Awards are an off-air awards ceremony were presented by magazine Grazia Indonesia, to honour for celebrity in fashion and entertainment. Bunga has received one award.

| Year | Nominee / work | Award | Result | Ref. |
|---|---|---|---|---|
| 2013 | Bunga Citra Lestari & Reza Rahadian | Most Stylish Celeb | Won | |

== Inbox Awards ==
Began established in 2009, the Inbox Awards are an awards ceremony were presented by Indonesian TV station Inbox and SCTV for talent as appreciated in music and entertainment.

| Year | Nominee / work | Award | Result | Ref. |
|---|---|---|---|---|
| 2014 | Bunga Citra Lestari | Most Inbox Female Solo Singer | Nominated | |

== Indigo Awards ==
The Indigo Awards (currently Indigo Digital Music Awards) are an annual award were presented by PT. Telekomunikasi Indonesia (Telkom) in 2009, to honour for artist, who have their song used most as ringback tones in all categories of creative industries and provide benefits for society, the environment, and create new business opportunities. Bunga received one award from 2 nominations.

| Year | Nominee / work | Award | Result | Ref. |
|---|---|---|---|---|
| 2010 | Bunga Citra Lestari | Best Digital Music Female Artist | Won | |
| 2011 | Bunga Citra Lestari | Best Female Artist | Nominated | |

== Indonesian Box Office Movie Awards ==
The Indonesian Box Office Movie Awards (shortly IBOMA) are an awards ceremony were honored for 10 films which regarded as the best-selling movie and earned a lot of viewers when aired in theaters.

| Year | Nominee / work | Award | Result | Ref. |
|---|---|---|---|---|
| 2017 | My Stupid Boss | Best Female Leading Role | Nominated | |

== Indonesian Social Media Awards ==
The Indonesian Social Media Awards are awarded to celebrities who had become trending topics and voted by fans in each social media. It was first established in 2016.

| Year | Nominee / work | Award | Result | Ref. |
|---|---|---|---|---|
| 2016 | Bunga Citra Lestari | Female Celeb Facebook | Nominated | |

== Indonesian Choice Awards ==
First established in 2014, the Indonesian Choice Awards are an annual awards were presented by the Indonesian television station NET. for quality talent in music and film.

| Year | Nominee / work | Award | Result | Ref. |
|---|---|---|---|---|
| 2014 | Bunga Citra Lestari | Female Singer of the Year | Nominated | |
| 2017 | Bunga Citra Lestari | Actress of the Year | Nominated | |
| 2018 | Bunga Citra Lestari | Actress of the Year | Nominated | |

== Indonesian Movie Awards ==
The Indonesian Movie Awards are an annual awards have been awarded for film-makers since 2007. Bunga received one award from 5 nominations.

| Year | Nominee / work | Award | Result | Ref. |
|---|---|---|---|---|
| 2007 | "Cinta Pertama (Sunny)" | Favorite Soundtrack (for film Cinta Pertama) | Nominated | |
| 2013 | Habibie & Ainun | Best Actress | Nominated | |
| 2013 | Habibie & Ainun | Favorite Actress | Nominated | |
| 2013 | Habibie & Ainun | Best Chemistry (with Reza Rahadian) | Nominated | |
| 2013 | "Cinta Sejati" | Favorite Soundtrack (for film Habibie & Ainun) | Won | |

== Infotainment Awards ==
The Infotainment Awards are an award ceremony have been presented by SCTV since 2012, to awarded for celebrity in entertainment. Bunga received one award from 6 nominations.

| Year | Nominee / work | Award | Result | Ref. |
|---|---|---|---|---|
| 2014 | Bunga Citra Lestari | Most Gorgeous Mom | Nominated | |
| 2015 | Bunga Citra Lestari | Most Fashionable Female Celebrity | Nominated | |
| 2015 | Bunga Citra Lestari | Sexiest Mom | Won | |
| 2016 | Bunga Citra Lestari | Gorgeous Mom | Nominated | |
| 2017 | Bunga Citra Lestari | Gorgeous Mom | Nominated | |
| 2017 | Bunga Citra Lestari | Most Fashionable Female Celebrity | Nominated | |

== Insert ==
=== Insert Awards ===
The Insert Awards are an awards ceremony presented by Trans TV infotainment program Insert, to awarded for celebrities in entertainment.

| Year | Nominee / work | Award | Result | Ref. |
|---|---|---|---|---|
| 2014 | Bunga Citra Lestari | Best Celebrity Actress | Nominated | |
| 2014 | Bunga Citra Lestari & Ashraf Sinclair | Celebrity Couple of the Year | Nominated | |

=== Insert Fashion Awards ===
| Year | Nominee / work | Award | Result | Ref. |
|---|---|---|---|---|
| 2015 | Bunga Citra Lestari & Ashraf Sinclair | Most Fashionable Celebrity Couple | Won | |
| 2016 | Bunga Citra Lestari & Ashraf Sinclair | Most Favorite Celebrity Couple | Nominated | |

== JawaPos.com Readers Choice Awards ==
The JawaPos.com Readers Choice Awards was an online awards have first established in 2017 by newspaper Jawa Pos, to honour for public figure in music, film and entertainment.

| Year | Nominee / work | Award | Result | Ref. |
|---|---|---|---|---|
| 2017 | Bunga Citra Lestari | Favorite Actress | Nominated | |

== Johnny Andrean Awards ==
| Year | Nominee / work | Award | Result | Ref. |
|---|---|---|---|---|
| 2010 | Bunga Citra Lestari | The Best Hair Do for Actress | Won | |
| 2014 | Bunga Citra Lestari & Ashraf Sinclair | The Best Appearance for Couple | Won | |

== Maya Awards ==
The Maya Awards (Indonesian translation: Piala Maya), is an annual Indonesian film award initiated in 2012 by Indonesian online film enthusiasts, that is initiated by @FILM_Indonesia Twitter account. Nominations and awards are given to each year's best local productions. Bunga has received one award from 2 nominations.

| Year | Nominee / work | Award | Result | Ref. |
|---|---|---|---|---|
| 2013 | "Cinta Sejati" (for film Habibie & Ainun) | Best Theme Song | Won | |
| 2016 | "Tunddukan Dunia" (for film 3 Srikandi) | Best Theme Song | Nominated | |
| 2016 | My Stupid Boss | Best Actress in a Leading Role | Nominated | |

== MTV Awards ==
=== MTV Ampuh ===
| Year | Nominee / work | Award | Result | Ref. |
|---|---|---|---|---|
| 2005 | Bunga Citra Lestari | Female Artist of the Year | Won | |
| 2006 | Bunga Citra Lestari | Female Artist of the Year | Won | |
| 2009 | Bunga Citra Lestari | Female Artist of the Year | Won | |
| 2009 | Bunga Citra Lestari | Artist of the Year | Won | |

=== MTV Indonesia Awards ===
The MTV Indonesia Awards are an annual music awards were presented by MTV Indonesia and began established in 2001, to recognized talent musician in music, based on chosen by their viewers throughout Indonesia.

| Year | Nominee / work | Award | Result | Ref. |
|---|---|---|---|---|
| 2008 | "Tentang Kamu" | Most Favorite Female | Nominated | |
| 2009 | "Pernah Muda" | Most Favorite Female Artist | Nominated | |

=== MTV Indonesia Movie Awards ===
The MTV Indonesia Movie Awards are an annual awards were established in 1995 by MTV Indonesia. The show is based on the MTV Movie Awards, and celebrates local films and actors.

| Year | Nominee / work | Award | Result | Ref. |
|---|---|---|---|---|
| 2007 | Cinta Pertama | Most Favorite Actress | Nominated | |
| 2007 | "Cinta Pertama (Sunny)" (for film Cinta Pertama) | Best Theme Song | Nominated | |

== Nickelodeon Indonesia Kids' Choice Awards ==
The Nickelodeon Indonesia Kids' Choice Awards is Indonesian version of Nickelodeon Kids' Choice Awards, held since 2008 in Jakarta. Bunga has received one award from 9 nominations.

| Year | Nominee / work | Award | Result | Ref. |
|---|---|---|---|---|
| 2008 | Bunga Citra Lestari | Favorite Female Singer | Nominated | |
| 2009 | Bunga Citra Lestari | Favorite Female Singer | Nominated | |
| 2009 | Bunga Citra Lestari | Indonesian Star Wannabe Award | Nominated | |
| 2010 | Bunga Citra Lestari | Favorite Female Singer | Nominated | |
| 2010 | Bunga Citra Lestari | Indonesian Star Wannabe Award | Nominated | |
| 2013 | Bunga Citra Lestari | Favorite Singer | Nominated | |
| 2013 | Bunga Citra Lestari | Favorite Actress | Nominated | |
| 2014 | Bunga Citra Lestari | Wannabe Award | Won | |
| 2017 | Bunga Citra Lestari | Favorite Actor/Actress | Nominated | |

== Oz Radio Bandung FM Awards ==
The Oz Radio Bandung FM Awards are an online radio awards were presented by OZ Radio FM, for talent musician/singer who have listed of 'friendly' in music.

| Year | Nominee / work | Award | Result | Ref. |
|---|---|---|---|---|
| 2018 | "Aku Wanita" (feat. Dipha Barus) | Most Friendly Collaboration | Pending | |
| 2018 | "Aku Wanita" (feat. Dipha Barus) | Most Friendly Cover/Recycle Song | Pending | |
| 2018 | Bunga Citra Lestari | Most Friendly Female Singer | Pending | |

== Panasonic Gobel Awards ==
The Panasonic Awards is an award presented to television programs and individuals, based on poll results. The poll was originally conducted by the Indonesian tabloid Citra, but was taken over by Nielsen Media Research in 2004.

| Year | Nominee / work | Award | Result | Ref. |
|---|---|---|---|---|
| 2010 | Bayu Cinta Luna | Favorite Actress | Nominated | |
| 2013 | Berbagi Cinta | Favorite Actress | Nominated | |

== Rolling Stone Editors' Choice Awards ==
The Rolling Stone Editors' Choice Awards are an awards were created by Indonesian Rolling Stone magazine to talent artist for outstanding contribution and achievement in popular culture. Bunga received one award.

| Year | Nominee / work | Award | Result | Ref. |
|---|---|---|---|---|
| 2007 | Bunga Citra Lestari | The Sensational Artist | Won | |

== SCTV Awards ==
Presented by SCTV on 2001, the SCTV Awards are an awards ceremony were presenting to most popular artists in entertainment, based on the audience's votes.

| Year | Nominee / work | Award | Result | Ref. |
|---|---|---|---|---|
| 2008 | Bunga Citra Lestari | Famous Singer | Nominated | |

== SCTV Music Awards ==
The SCTV Awards are an annual award were presented by the Indonesian television station SCTV to recognize the talent musician in the music, based on audience votes. Bunga received one award from three nominations.

| Year | Nominee / work | Award | Result | Ref. |
|---|---|---|---|---|
| 2007 | Cinta Pertama (Sunny) | Famous Solo Singer Album | Won | |
| 2008 | The Best Of Ari Lasso (as featured artist) | Famous Duo/Group Pop/Rock Album | Nominated | |
| 2009 | Tentang Kamu | Famous Solo Pop Album | Nominated | |

== Selebrita Awards ==
The Selebrita Awards are an awards had giving to honour for celebrity in entertainment and based on voted in website by fans. Bunga received one award from 4 nominations.

| Year | Nominee / work | Award | Result | Ref. |
|---|---|---|---|---|
| 2013 | Bunga Citra Lestari | Best Dressed of the Year | Won | |
| 2016 | Bunga Citra Lestari | Most Celeb Movie Star | Nominated | |
| 2017 | Bunga Citra Lestari | Most Celeb Movie Star | Nominated | |
| 2017 | Bunga Citra Lestari & Ashraf Sinclair | Most Celeb Couple | Nominated | |

== Silet Awards ==
The Silet Awards are annual awards were established in 2014 by infotainment program Silet and RCTI to awarding for celebrity in entertainment.

| Year | Nominee / work | Award | Result | Ref. |
|---|---|---|---|---|
| 2016 | Bunga Citra Lestari | Razored Hottest Mom | Nominated | |
| 2016 | "Kuasa-Mu" (for Catatan Hati Seorang Istri 2) | Razored Soap Opera Theme Song | Nominated | |

== Usmar Ismail Awards ==
The Usmar Ismail Awards are an annual film awards have giving honour for artist(s) and has established in 2016, presented by H. Usmar Ismail Foundation of Film Center and Trans 7, to commemorate the National Film Day and honor the hero national film, H. Usmar Ismail. Bunga received one award.

| Year | Nominee / work | Award | Result | Ref. |
|---|---|---|---|---|
| 2017 | Bunga Citra Lestari | Favorite Actress in Leading Role | Won | |

== Yahoo! OMG Awards ==
The Yahoo! OMG Awards are an online annual awards were presented by Yahoo! Indonesia which established in 2012, to honour for celebrity in entertainment, based on online voting system in website. Bunga received one award from 4 nominations.

| Year | Nominee / work | Award | Result | Ref. |
|---|---|---|---|---|
| 2012 | Bunga Citra Lestari & Ashraf Sinclair | Favorite Couple | Won | |
| 2013 | Bunga Citra Lestari | Celeb of the Year | Nominated | |
| 2013 | Bunga Citra Lestari | Sexiest Mom | Nominated | |
| 2013 | Bunga Citra Lestari | Friendliest Celebrity | Nominated | |

== Accolades from Organization ==
=== Anugerah Kekayaan Intelektual Nasional ===
| Year | Nominee / work | Award | Result | Ref. |
|---|---|---|---|---|
| 2013 | Bunga Citra Lestari | Multi Talent Artist | Recipient | |
| 2014 | Bunga Citra Lestari | Performer | Recipient | |

=== Pond's ===
| Year | Nominee / work | Award | Result | Ref. |
|---|---|---|---|---|
| 2015 | Bunga Citra Lestari | 10 Most Expressive Woman | Recipient | |
