= Cinta Pertama =

Cinta Pertama may refer to:

- Cinta Pertama (1973 film), directed by Teguh Karya and starring Christine Hakim
- Cinta Pertama (2006 film), starring Bunga Citra Lestari
