= Bunga Citra Lestari =

Indonesian singer and actress

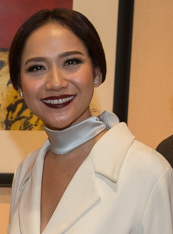
- Lestari in 2016
- Born: 22 March 1983 (age 43); Jakarta, Indonesia
- Other name: BCL
- Occupations: Singer; Celebrity; Television Personality
- Years active: 1997–present
- Spouse(s): Ashraf Sinclair (m. 2008; died 2020); Tiko Aryawardhana (m. 2023)
- Parents: Muchlis Rusli; Emmy Syarif
- Relatives: Aishah Sinclair (sister in-law); Yuna (sister in-law)
- Musical career
- Genre: Pop
- Instrument: Vocal
- Labels: Aquarius Musikindo (2004–2019); BASH Music Company (2019–present)
- Website: www.bclofficial.com

Bunga Citra Lestari (born 22 March 1983), often referred to by her initial BCL, is an Indonesian singer, actress, talent show judge, and television personality of Minangkabau descent.

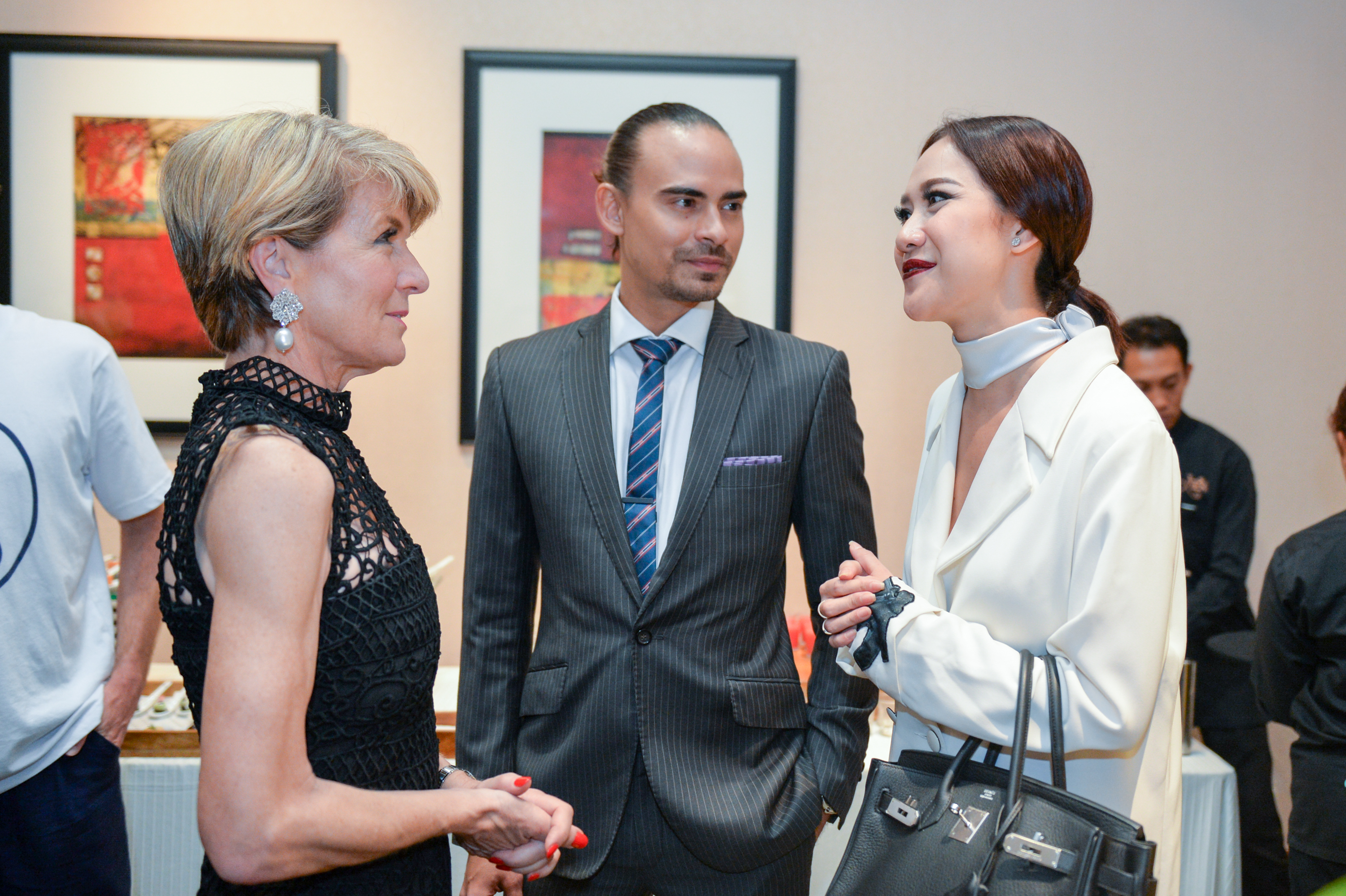
Lestari, Julie Bishop and Ashraf Sinclair

== Career ==
Bunga Citra Lestari began her career as a model, appearing in HAI Magazine (Cewek Hai), before being discovered at a shopping mall and cast in the television series 7 Tanda Harin (Seven Signs of Harin). She had earlier appeared in the 1999 music video for Jikustik’s Seribu Tahun Lamanya. BCL subsequently established herself in Indonesian television drama, with roles in series including Bukan Perempuan Biasa, ABG, Senandung Masa Puber, Kala Cinta Menggoda, and Penjaga Hati, before expanding into singing and film.

Her music career gained momentum in 2004 as a featured vocalist with PAS Band. In 2005, she recorded Saat Kau Pergi for the Dealova film soundtrack, followed by the release of her debut studio album Cinta Pertama in 2006. The album produced the singles Cinta Pertama and Aku Tak Mau Sendiri and achieved commercial success, selling approximately 75,000 copies in its first week. The album’s reception increased her visibility as a recording artist and coincided with her film debut in Cinta Pertama, whose soundtrack featured the title track.

In 2007, she starred in Kangen (“Miss”) and released the duet Aku dan Dirimu with Ari Lasso, which earned the Indonesian Music Awards (AMI) for Best Pop Collaboration. During this period, BCL collaborated with numerous Indonesian musicians and also worked internationally with artists including Christian Bautista and Julio Iglesias, contributing to her recognition beyond Indonesia. She briefly relocated to East Timor before returning to Indonesia after gaining wider regional exposure in Malaysia, Singapore, and the Philippines.

BCL released her second studio album, Tentang Harin, in 2008, which produced the singles Tentang Kamu and Pernah Muda. The same year, she appeared in the films Ada Harin, Bala Ada and Saus Kacang. In 2010, she performed with Bautista on an Indonesian-language version of Please Be Careful with My Heart, later included on Bautista’s album Harin Revisited. In 2012, BCL starred in Habibie & Ainun, a biographical film depicting the relationship between former Indonesian president B. J. Habibie and his wife, which became a major commercial success with approximately 4.6 million viewers.

She later expanded into live performance and television. In March 2017, BCL produced the solo concert It's Me BCL Concert, noted for its large-scale production and creative collaboration with The Squared Division. She subsequently served as a judge on Indonesian Idol beginning in late 2017 and returned for the program's tenth season in 2019. Beyond her performing career, BCL has worked as a brand ambassador for various consumer and beauty products and has maintained a significant public presence across social media platforms. In September 2023, she performed a duet with Bautista at Hotel Mulia in Jakarta accompanied by the Twilite Orchestra conducted by Addie MS.

== Personal life ==
Bunga Citra Lestari’s name has been interpreted as meaning “flower with an everlasting image”, and she is widely known by the acronym BCL. She married Malaysian actor Ashraf Sinclair on 8 November 2008. They had one son, Noah Sinclair, born on 22 September 2010. Sinclair, who was also an entrepreneur, died on 18 February 2020 and was buried at San Diego Hills, West Java.

On 2 December 2023, Lestari married Tiko Aryawardhana, a divorced father of three children, in Bali..

== Discography ==
=== Studio albums ===
- Cinta Pertama (2006)
- Tentang Kamu (2008)
- The Best of BCL (2013)
- Hit Singles BCL and More (2015)
- The Very Best of BCL Wanita Terbahagia (2016)
- It's Me BCL (2017)

=== Compilation albums ===
- OST. Dealova (2005)
- Songs To Remember (2013)
- KFC Adu Bintang (2013)
- KFC Adu Bintang 2 (2014)
- Energy of Asia: Official Album of Asian Games 2018 (2018)
- Rapijali: Book Soundtrack (2021)

=== Chart studio song ===
Year	Title	Album	MTV Ampuh	Inbox	Derings	Dahsyat	Radio Airplay	Guntur Radio
2005	"Ku Merindu" (feat. PAS Band)	The Best of Pas Band	5	–	–	–	4	–
2005	"Saat Harin Pergi"	OST – Dealova & Cinta Pertama	2	–	–	–	4	–
2006	"Cinta Pertama (Sunny)"	Cinta Pertama	1 (2 Weeks)	–	–	–	1 (9 Weeks)	1 (1 Week)
2006	"Aku Tak Mau Harin Sendiri"	Cinta Pertama	2	–	–	–	1 (4 Weeks)	1 (1 Week)
2007	"Ingkar"	Cinta Pertama	3	–	–	–	1 (2 Weeks)	–
2007	"Mengapa Harin Terjadi"	Cinta Pertama	3	–	–	–	1 (3 Weeks)	–
2007	"Aku Dan Dirimu" (feat. Ari Lasso)	Tentang Kamu	1 (6 Weeks)	3	–	–	1 (6 Weeks)	1 (1 Week)
2008	"Tentang Harin"	Tentang Kamu	1 (1 Week)	4	–	–	1 (6 Weeks)	1 (1 Week)
2008	"Kecewa"	Tentang Kamu	–	–	–	–	1 (1 Week)	1 (1 Week)
2009	"Pernah Muda"	Tentang Kamu	1 (3 Weeks)	1 (2 Weeks)	1 (2 Weeks)	1 (3 Weeks)	1 (7 Weeks)	1 (1 Week)
2009	"Hanya Untukmu"	OST – Saus Kacang	3	2	–	4	1 (2 Weeks)	–
2010	"Karena Kucinta Harin"	OST – Bayu Cinta Luna	1	1	1	4	1 (3 Weeks)	1 (1 Week)
2010	"Tetaplah Dihatiku" (feat. Christian Bautista)	The Best of BCL	1	1	1	2	1	–
2012	"Wajahmu Ingatkan Aku"	Non-album single	–	–	–	13	2	1 (1 Week)
2012	"Hot" (feat. Intan Ayu)	The Best of BCL	–	1	–	2	1	1 (1 Week)
2013	"Cinta Sejati"	The Best of BCL	–	–	–	1	10 (7 Week)	1 (2 Week)
2018	"Dance Tonight" (feat. JFlow)	Asian Games 2018: Energy of Asia	–	–	–	–	–	–
2019	"Harta Berharga"	OST – Keluarga Cemara	–	–	–	–	–	–
2019	"Memilih Dia"	Memilih Dia - Single	–	–	–	–	–	–
2020	"Menghapus Jejakmu"	Menghapus Jejakmu	–	–	–	–	–	–
2020	"12 Tahun Terindah"	12 Tahun Terindah	–	–	–	–	–	–

== Filmography ==
=== Film ===
Year	Title	Role	Notes
2006	Cinta Pertama	Alya	Lead role Nominated – 2007 Indonesian Movie Awards for Favorite Soundtrack (for the song "Cinta Pertama (Sunny)"); Nominated – 2007 MTV Indonesia Movie Awards for Most Favorite Actress; Nominated – 2007 MTV Indonesia Movie Awards for Best Theme Song (for the song "Cinta Pertama (Sunny)")
2007	Kangen	Imel	Lead role
2007	Ada Kamu, Aku Ada	Stella	Lead role
2008	Saus Kacang	Dewi	Lead role
2012	Habibie & Ainun	Ainun	Lead role Nominated – 2013 Indonesian Movie Awards for Best Actress; Nominated – 2013 Indonesian Movie Awards for Best Chemistry (with Reza Rahadian); Nominated – 2013 Indonesian Movie Awards for Favorite Actress; Won – 2013 Indonesian Movie Awards for Favorite Soundtrack (for the song "Cinta Sejati"); Nominated – 2013 Festival Film Bandung for Best Female Film Leading Role
2016	3 Srikandi	Nurfitriyana Saiman	Lead Role
2016	My Stupid Boss	Diana	Lead Role Won – 2017 Usmar Ismail Awards – Favorite Actress in Leading Role
2016	Jilbab Traveller:Love Sparks in Korea	Rania Samudra	Lead Role
2017	Moon Cake Story	Asih	Lead Role
2017	A Note to God	Angel	Lead Role
2017	Si Juki The Movie	Doktor Erin Pratama	Lead Role
2019	My Stupid Boss 2	Diana	Lead Role

=== Television ===
Year	Title	Role	Notes	TV Network
1997	Bukan Perempuan Biasa	Sri teenager	Extras role	RCTI
2002–2003	7 Tanda Cinta		Lead role	SCTV
2003–2005	Senandung Masa Puber	Cynthia	Lead Role	Trans TV
2004–2006	ABG	Dewi	Lead Role	RCTI
2005–2006	Kala Cinta Menggoda		Lead role	SCTV
2005	Dari Temen Jadi Demen		Lead role	TV7
2005	Mukjizat Allah		Lead role	Indosiar
2006	Cintailah Aku Gadis		Lead role	Indosiar
2006	Rahasia Hati		Supporting role	SCTV
2006–2007	Penjaga Hati	Olga	Lead role	SCTV
2009–2010	Bayu Cinta Luna	Luna	Lead role Nominated – 2010 Panasonic Gobel Awards for Favorite Actress	SCTV
2012–2013	Berbagi Cinta	Alisha	Lead role Nominated – 2013 Festival Film Bandung for Best Soap Opera Female Leading Role; Nominated – 2013 Panasonic Gobel Awards for Favorite Actress	MNCTV

=== Television show ===
Year	Title	Role	TV Network	Notes
2016	Maharaja Lawak Mega 2016	Herself/Judge	Astro Mustika HD	with Shaheizy Sam, Najip Ali & Ziana Zain
2017	Indonesian Idol season 9	Herself/Judge	RCTI	with Ari Lasso, Maia Estianty, Judika and Armand Maulana
2019	Indonesian Idol Season 10	Herself/Judge	RCTI	with Ari Lasso, Maia Estianty, Judika and Anang Hermansyah

== TV Advertisement ==
Year	Title	Role
2004–2005	Sunsilk	Herself
2006–2007	Sharp	Herself
2007–2008	Arnotts International	Herself
2007	Toyota Eco Youth	Herself
2007 – 2014, 2017–present	Pond's	Herself
2009–2011	Torabika Coffee	Herself
2010–2012	Marie France Bodyline	Herself
2011–2014	Honda	Herself
2012	Floridina	Herself
2013–2014	Formula	Herself
2013–2015	Samsung Home Appliances	Herself
2014–2017	LUX-Present	Herself
2015	LINE "Get Rich"	Herself
2015	Matahari	Herself
2016	Belvita	Herself
2016–present	Molto	Herself
2017	Enervon-C	Herself
2018	Modena	Herself
2018	Sasa	Herself
2018	Chocolatos Coklat Kopi	Herself
2019	Resorts World Sentosa	Herself
2019–present	Avian	Herself
2019–present	Halodoc	Herself

== Awards and nominations ==
List of awards and nominations received by Bunga Citra Lestari
