= Seperti Seharusnya =

Studio album by Noah
- Released: September 16, 2012
- Genres: Alternative rock; pop rock; rock; slow rock; post-grunge
- Length: 43:46
- Language: Indonesian
- Label: Musica Studios

Noah chronology
Suara Lainnya (2012)	Seperti Seharusnya (2012)	Second Chance (2014)

Singles from Seperti Seharusnya
- 1. "Separuh Aku" Released: August 3, 2012; 2. "Hidup Untukmu, Mati Tanpamu" Released: November 25, 2012; 3. "Jika Engkau" Released: May 28, 2013; 4. "Tak Lagi Sama" Released: October 6, 2013; 5. "Ini Cinta" Released: February 2014

Seperti Seharusnya (English: As It Should Be) is a studio album by Indonesian band Noah. It was released on September 16, 2012, by Musica Studios. The first single from this album, "Separuh Aku", was released in August 2012.

This album contains ten tracks which also included songs that had already been released as a soundtrack a movie or television series. Due to piracy and the critical state of the Indonesian music scene, Noah's record label collaborated with the Indonesian franchise of the American fast food restaurant, KFC to distribute the album in all KFC stores throughout Indonesia exclusively, although several years later the album was also distributed on regular retail music stores.

The album title taken from lyric of "Walau Habis Terang".

== Release and promotion ==
Prior to releasing Seperti Seharusnya, Noah release the album's lead single, "Separuh Aku", on August 3, 2012, via radio airplay. Its video music was released on August 5, 2012.

On September 16, 2012, which happened to be Noah's vocalist Ariel's birthday, Noah released Seperti Seharusnya while holding concerts in five country in 24-hours. Noah then followed it up with a press conference for the release on September 22, 2012.

After the album's release, Noah promoted it with a concert tour in Indonesia from September 2012 to November 2012. The tour was closed with a concert titled The Greatest Session of the History on November 2, 2012, in Mata Elang International Stadium, Ancol. Noah then continue promoting the album with 25-city tour in Indonesia from November 2012 to February 2013.

The album's next single was "Hidup Untukmu, Mati Tanpamu", whose music video was released on November 25, 2012. To support the single's release, Noah held a concert titled Konser Super Dahsyat HUMT on November 26.

On June 27, 2013, Noah release a karaoke DVD for Seperti Seharusnya. In 2013, Noah release two music videos for the album's songs: one for "Jika Engkau", which was released on May 28, 2013, and "Tak Lagi Sama", which was released on October 6, 2013. The last music video released for this album was the music video for "Ini Cinta", which was released on March 7, 2014.

== Track listing ==
No.	Title	Writer(s)	Length
1.	"Raja Negeriku" (King of My Country)	Ariel, Uki	4:36
2.	"Jika Engkau" (If You)	Ariel, Lukman	4:29
3.	"Separuh Aku" (Half of Me)	David, Ihsan Nurrachman	4:28
4.	"Hidup Untukmu, Mati Tanpamu" (Live for You, Die Without You)	Ariel, Rian D'Masiv	5:25
5.	"Ini Cinta" (This Love)	Ariel	3:20
6.	"Terbangun Sendiri" (Awoken Alone)	Ariel	4:36
7.	"Sendiri Lagi" (Alone Again)	Ryan Kyoto	4:03
8.	"Demi Kita" (For Us)	Lukman	4:08
9.	"Tak Lagi Sama" (Not the Same Anymore)	David, Ihsan Nurrachman	5:15
10.	"Puisi Adinda" (Adinda's Poetry)	Ariel	2:31
Total length:			43:46

== Certifications ==
Region	Certification	Certified units/sales
Indonesia "Multi" Platinum	Platinum	1,900,000
