= Wieke Gur =

Wieke Gur is an Indonesian-Australian songwriter and consultant. She is best known for co-writing songs with Elfa Secioria, such as Selamat Datang Cinta ('Welcome, Love'; popularized by Harvey Malaiholo) and Pesta (Party); the former won the 1985 competition Festival Lagu Populer Indonesia (Indonesian Popular Songs Festival). She moved to Australia in 1998 and has since worked as an intercultural consultant and coach. In 2009, she wrote a book, Jatuh Cinta Lagi (Falling in Love Again), which dug through her songwriting experiences.
