= Harvey Malaiholo =

Indonesian actor, singer and politician

Harvey Malaihollo
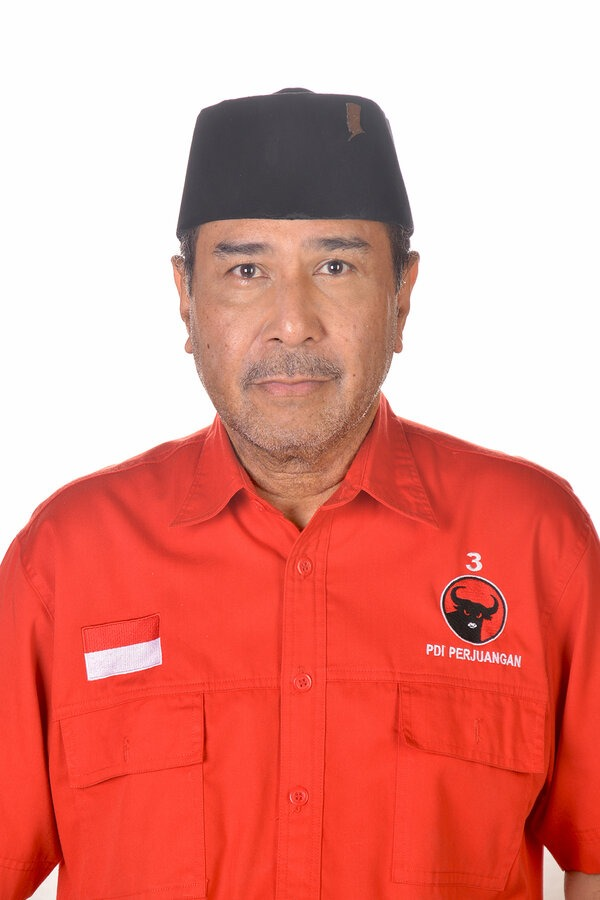
- Born: Harvey Benjamin Malaihollo; May 3, 1962 (age 64); Jakarta, Indonesia
- Other name: Harvey Malaihollo
- Occupations: Singer; actor; politician
- Years active: 1977–present
- Political party: PDI-P (since 2019)
- Relatives: Bram Titaley (grandfather); Mikha Tambayong (niece)
- Musical career
- Genres: Pop; Pop kreatif; Jazz; Latin; Soul; R&B
- Instrument: Vocals
- Labels: Musica Studios; Warner Music Indonesia; Tanama Record

Member of the People's Representative Council
- In office January 11, 2022 – September 30, 2024; Interim Replacement
- Preceded by: Jimmy Demianus Ijie
- Succeeded by: None
- Constituency: West Papua

Harvey Benjamin Malaihollo (born May 3, 1962) is an Indonesian actor, singer and politician of Ambon, Maluku descent. He is an interim replacement member of the House of Representatives of the Republic of Indonesia from the Indonesian Democratic Party of Struggle (PDI-P) who served from 2022 to 2024 from the electoral district of West Papua.

== Family ==
Harvey Benjamin Malaihollo, born on May 3, 1962, in Jakarta, Indonesia, hails from a musically inclined family; his mother was a member of the Titaley Sisters, and his grandfather was the renowned Indonesian singer Bram Titaley. From an early age, Harvey was immersed in jazz music, often singing alongside his mother, Maudy Titaley. His father, Daniel Benjamin Malaihollo, nurtured his musical talents by encouraging him to buy Cassettes and LPs (Black plates) to introduce him to the works of iconic artists like Frank Sinatra and Michael Jackson. Despite initial comparisons to the late Broery Marantika, Harvey established his unique identity in the Indonesian music scene, with his distinctive thick moustache becoming his signature look.

== Career ==
=== Music career ===
Harvey Malaihollo began his music career in the 1970s, recording albums and gaining recognition among Indonesia's leading musicians and music industry professionals. He was widely known through The Big Five, a reference to Indonesia's top musicians of the time.

His breakthrough moment came in 1976, when he won first place in the National Youth Radio and Television Star competition in the male category. This is often regarded as the starting point of his successful music career.

=== Political career ===
Harvey Malaihollo receiving a delegation from the IKBP

In the 2019 Indonesian legislative general election, Harvey Malaihollo ran as a candidate for the House of Representatives (DPR-RI) from the Indonesian Democratic Party of Struggle (PDI-P) Faction for the West Papua electoral district. On January 11, 2022, he was appointed and inaugurated as an interim replacement member of the House of Representatives of the Republic of Indonesia, following the passing of Jimmy Demianus Ijie. He has since represented West Papua under the PDI-P Faction.

== Personal life ==
Harvey is married to Lolita, who is also as his manager. Together, they have two sons, Joshua Benjamin and Benjamin Joshua.

== Discography ==
=== Solo ===
- Vol 1 (1977)
- Sudah Kubilang
- Coklat Susu
- Senja Dibatas Kota
- Taragak (1987; Minang Pop Album)
- Aku Begini Kau Begitu (1989)
- Mau Tak Mau – 1989
- Kugapai Hari Esok
- Pengertian – 1993
- Hidup Yang Sepi
- Sentuhan Kasih (1998)
- Tetaplah Bersamaku (1998), composed by Elfa Secioria and Wieke Gur
- Begitulah Cinta (2000)

=== Duets ===
- Bagian 1 – 1985 – with Ireng Maulana
- Volume 2 – with Ireng Maulana
- Merah Biru Bossanova – with Ireng Maulana
- Volume 1 – 1977 – with Rafika Duri
- Volume 3 – 1978 – with Rafika Duri
- Rafika & Harvey – with Rafika Duri
- Titian Karier – 1983 – with Rafika Duri
- Cinta Dan Kedamaian with Tina
- Gempita dalam Dada – with Elfa Secioria
- Old And New – with Bram Titaley

=== Compilation ===
- Reflections Of Harvey Malaihollo – Greatest Hits 1987 – 2007
- Harvey Malaihollo dan Teman Bintang (2012)

=== Other appearances ===
- Performed "SURYA KHATULISTIWA" by Roekanto D., Esti W. in the Indonesian Popular Song Festival 1980 Album
- Performed "JAYALAH INDONESIA" by Anton Issoedibyo and "NEGERI DEWATA" by Anton Issoedibyo, Bangun Sugito, Djito Kasilo in the Indonesian Popular Song Festival 1981 Album
- Performed "Gadis Kecil" by Noca Catherine S. in the 1982/1983 Teenage Songwriting Competition
- Performed "Lady" by Anton Issoedibyo in the Indonesian Popular Song Festival 1982 Album, winning the Kawakami Special Award at the 13th World Popular Song Festival, Tokyo, Japan 1982
- Performed "Kugapai Hari Esok" by Elfa Secioria & Ferina, winning "The Best Performer" at the Golden Kite Festival 1982 in Kuala Lumpur, Malaysia
- Performed "Tabir Tercinta" by Dwiki Dharmawan, Ferina in the Indonesian Popular Song Festival 1984 Album
- Performed "Selamat Datang Cinta" by Elfa Secioria and Wieke Gur & "SEMOGA LESTARI" by Hen, Elfa Secioria, Irianti Erningpraja in the Indonesian Popular Song Festival 1985 Album
- Performed "SEANDAINYA SELALU SATU" by Elfa Secioria and Wieke Gur in the Indonesian Popular Song Festival 1986 Album, winning "The Best Singer" at the World Pop Song Festival in Budokan, Tokyo, Japan 1986
- Performed "Kusadari" by Elfa Secioria & Wieke Gur in the Indonesian Popular Song Festival 1987 Album
- Performed "Indonesia Jaya" by Dharma Oratmangun in the 1987 National Songwriting Competition Album
- Performed "Gempita Dalam Dada" by Elfa Secioria Wieke Gur, winning 2nd Prize at the 2nd Golden Kite World Song Festival, Kuala Lumpur, Malaysia 1986
- Performed "Begitulah Cinta" by Oddie Agam with Vina Panduwinata and "Ternyata" by Tamam Hoesein, Wieke Gur in the Indonesian Popular Song Festival 1988 Album

== Filmography ==
=== Film ===
Acting roles
Year	Title	Role	Notes
1979	Pelajaran Cinta	Lesmono	

== Achievements and recognition ==
Some of the awards and festivals attended by Harvey Malaihollo:

- Participant, Cerbul de Aur Song Festival, Bosof, Romania 1993
- 1st Prize For Jakarta's Radio & Television Singer Contest/ Bintang Radio & Televisi 1975
- 1st Prize for Indonesia's Radio & Television Singer Contest / Bintang Radio & Televisi1976
- The Best Singer of National Pop Song Festival/Festival Lagu Populer Indonesia (1986, 1987, 1988, 1991)
- Kawakami Special Award, The 13th World Popular Song Festival, Tokyo, Japan 1982
- Best Performer, 1st Golden Kite World Song Festival, Kuala Lumpur, Malaysia 1984
- 2nd Prize, 2nd Golden Kite World Song Festival, Kuala Lumpur, Malaysia 1986
- Best Performer, The 17th World Popular Song Festival, Tokyo, Japan 1986
- Best Performer, ASEAN Pop Song Festival, Singapore 1988
- Participant, World Song Festival, Vina del Mar,Chile 1988
- Best Singer with Elfa's Singer, ASEAN Popular Song Festival, Manila, Philippines 1989
- Silver Award with Topeng 'n Mask Band, Band Explosion, Tokyo, Japan 1989
- Participant, with Topeng 'n Mask Band, The Star Search Program, Los Angeles, US 1989
- Participant, with Bhaskara Band, North Sea Jazz Festival, Den Haag, Holland 1991
- Represented Indonesia at the 17th SEA Games Opening & Closing Ceremony, Singapore
- Nugraha Bhakti Musik Indonesia Award, Indonesian Singers, Songwriters, and Music Arrangers Association (PAPPRI), Indonesia, March 23, 2011.

== Awards and nominations ==
Tahun	Penghargaan	Kategori	Karya yang dinominasikan	Hasil	Ref.
2008	Anugerah Musik Indonesia	Karya Produksi Kolaborasi Terbaik	"Aku Sadari" (bersama Dian Pramana Poetra)	Nominated	

== Electoral history ==
Election	Legislative body	Electoral district	Political party	Vote count	Result
2019	People's Representative Council of the Republic of Indonesia	West Papua	Indonesian Democratic Party of Struggle	Unknown	Not Elected
2024	People's Representative Council of the Republic of Indonesia	Southwest Papua	Indonesian Democratic Party of Struggle	Unknown	Not Elected
