= Separuh Aku =

2012 single by Noah

Single by Noah

from the album Seperti Seharusnya
- Released: 3 August 2012
- Genre: Pop, pop rock, power ballad
- Length: 4:26
- Label: Musica Studio's
- Songwriters: David; Ihsan

Noah singles chronology
"Cobalah Mengerti" (2012)	"Separuh Aku" (2012)	"Hidup Untukmu, Mati Tanpamu" (2012)

Music video
- "Separuh Aku" on YouTube

"Separuh Aku" (Half of Me) is a song by Indonesian rock band Noah. It was written by Noah's keyboardist David and their additional bassist Ihsan, for their first album after their name change, Seperti Seharusnya. It was released on 3 August 2012 as the album's first single.

== Writing and recording ==
"Separuh Aku" was written by Noah's keyboardist David and Noah's additional bassist Ihsan. David said that he came up with idea for the song after listening to his friend confiding in him. David described "Separuh Aku" as a song themed around empathy. A demo version of the song was leaked in 2010, but Noah's guitarist Uki stated that the song has been re-recorded to make the final version different.

== Release ==
Noah released "Separuh Aku" as a single on 3 August 2012 via airplay on 200 radios in Indonesia. It was the first single from Noah's first album Seperti Seharusnya and their first single since Noah announced their new name. Seperti Seharusnya was released on 16 September 2012, with "Separuh Aku" as its third track.

== Music video ==
The music video for "Separuh Aku" was directed by Nicholas Nicky. The video depicts Noah's vocalist Ariel portraying personifications of his dark and light sides and Indonesian actress Gista Putri portraying his girlfriend. It was recorded in 2010 in Jakarta. But, because Ariel was arrested in 2010, both "Separuh Aku" and its music video's release were delayed.

The music video was released on Musica Studios's YouTube channel on 5 August 2012. According to Google Indonesia, the video was the third-most popular YouTube video in Indonesia in 2012.

== Reception ==
"Separuh Aku" won several awards. At Anugerah Musik Indonesia 2013, "Separuh Aku" won three awards for Best of the Best Production Work, Best Pop Duo/Group/Collaboration and Best Pop Producer/Arranger. At Anugerah Planet Muzik 2013, Noah won the Best Band category for "Separuh Aku", and the song was nominated for Best Indonesian Song and Most Popular Regional Song.

== Charts ==
Chart (2019)	Peak position
Indonesia (Indonesian Hot 100)	57
