= Karinding =

Indonesian traditional musical instruments

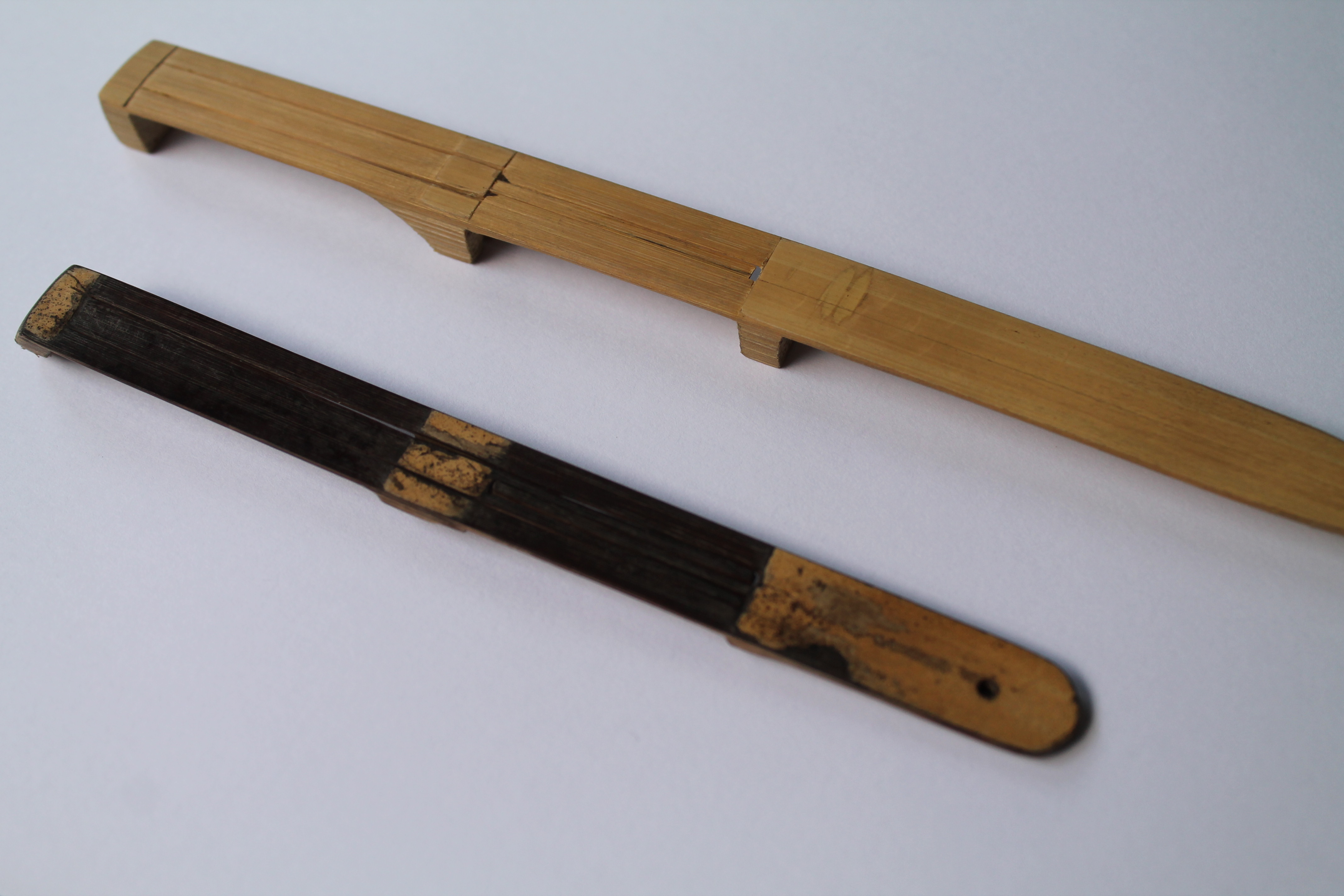

Woodwind instrument
- Inventor: Sundanese
- Developed: Indonesia

The Karinding is a Sundanese traditional musical instrument from Indonesia. It is similar to the Jew's harp and the Dani People's Pikon; are usually made from bamboo and midribs of palm trees. Karindings made of palm tree midribs are traditionally used by male players, and bamboo instruments are used by female players.

Initially the karinding was used by ancestors to repel pests in rice fields, because the low decibel sound from karinding can disrupt the insect hearing.

== How to play ==
One places the karinding between one's two lips, then one end is beaten with a finger so that the vibrations occur in the middle. Then the rhythm of the karinding music is determined by the movement of the tongue and lips, which became the media echo reflector of the vibration. Its voice sounds like a big frog in the middle of rice fields.
