= Bayu Cinta Luna =

- Created by: Manoj Punjabi
- Directed by: Akbar Bhakti
- Creative directors: Karan Mahtani, Saurabh George Swamy, Eni Hawari
- Starring: Bunga Citra Lestari; Chico Jericho; Celine Evangelista; Arie Dwi Andhika; Rendy Septino; Siti Anizah; Eza Gionino; Fendy Chow; Tasman Taher; Tyas Mirasih
- Original language: Indonesian
- No. of episodes: 139

Production
- Producers: Dhamoo Punjabi; Manoj Punjabi
- Running time: 90 minutes

Original release
- Network: SCTV
- Release: October 19, 2009 – March 8, 2010

Related
- Melati untuk Marvel; Mawar Melati

Bayu Cinta Luna (transl. Bayu Loves Luna) is an Indonesian television series produced by MD Entertainment which premiered on October 19, 2009 on SCTV. This series was directed by Akbar Bhakti and stars Bunga Citra Lestari, Chicco Jericho, and Fendy Chow.

== Synopsis ==
Rahman and Imran's friendship continues to their descendants. Rahman's sons, Bayu and Krishna are very close to Bimo, Imran's son. They also work in the same office.

Meanwhile, Luna has just quit her job over a trivial matter. Her boss misbehaved with her at a party which led to people thinking bad about her including Bayu who was also there at the party. Luna applies for a job at Bayu's office without his knowledge. Bimo, who has a liking for Luna, tells Bayu to look after that pretty girl. Bimo gets upset when Bayu accuses Luna of not being a nice girl.

As time goes by, Bimo finally dares to show his real feelings. But at the same time, Bayu comes to realize that Luna is actually a very pretty and a nice girl. Bayu too starts to fall in love with Luna. This confuses him as he doesn't know if he should choose his friendship with Bimo over his love for Luna. Indeed, two very difficult options but a decision has to be made.

== Cast ==
- Bunga Citra Lestari sebagai Luna Cynthia Dewi
- Chicco Jerikho sebagai Bayu Tejakusuma Irawan
- Fendy Chow sebagai Bimo Aryo
- Ajeng Kartika sebagai Zia Amelia Florentina/Kezia Anastasia
- Arie Dwi Andhika sebagai Sandhy
- Tyas Mirasih sebagai Yulia
- Bayu Kusuma Negara sebagai Fahri
- Celine Evangelista sebagai Nadia
- Rendy Septino sebagai Krisna
- Eza Gionino sebagai Ivan
- Ferdi Ali sebagai Reza
- Siti Anizah sebagai Riska
- Velove Vexia sebagai Intan
- Garneta Haruni
- Marsha Aruan sebagai Tina
- Indah Indriana
- Alisia Rininta sebagai Shelly
- Boy Tirayoh sebagai Rahman Pramudya/Akbar
- Ria Probo sebagai Lia
- Della Puspita sebagai Seruni
- Tasman Taher sebagai Imran
- Wawan Wanisar sebagai Ershad
- Ade Surya Akbar sebagai Dewo
- Donny Michael sebagai Rendi
- Egi Fedly sebagai Haryo
- Firdha Razak
- Felix William Smith
- Irena Justine
