= Rizky Nazar =

Indonesian actor and film producer

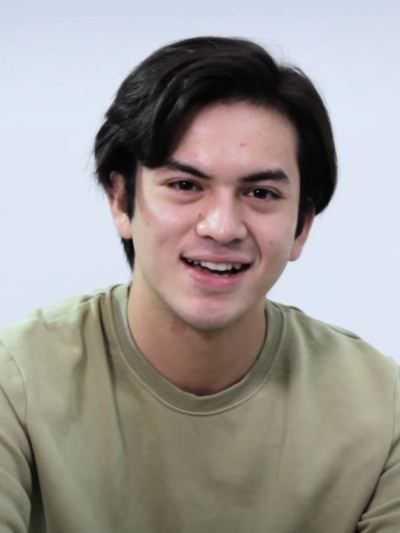
- Rizky Nazar in 2018
- Born: Rizky Nazar Mubarak Basloom; March 7, 1996 (age 30); Buleleng, Bali, Indonesia
- Occupations: Actor; Model; Singer
- Years active: 2012–present

Rizky Nazar Mubarak Basloom (born March 7, 1996) is an Indonesian actor and model. He is known for his roles in Indonesian television series and romantic drama films.

== Early life and background ==
Rizky Nazar was born in Singaraja, Bali, Indonesia, to Nasar Mubarak Basloom and Ni Putu Ayu Baswedan. He is of mixed heritage, with Arab-Indonesian ancestry from his father's side and Balinese heritage from his mother's side.

== Career ==
=== 2012–2014: Early career and breakthrough ===
Rizky Nazar began his acting career in 2012 through the television series Cinta Bersemi di Putih Abu-Abu. His performance attracted attention from younger audiences and led to further roles in television productions.

He subsequently appeared in Pesantren & Rock n' Roll Season 3 (2013), which helped expand his visibility in the Indonesian television industry.

=== 2015–2019: Film success and rising popularity ===
Rizky Nazar transitioned into film and gained wider recognition through leading roles in romantic drama films. His role in Magic Hour (2015) marked a significant milestone in his career.

He continued to build his filmography with roles in:

- I Love You from 38,000 Ft (2016)
- London Love Story 2 (2017)
- The Way I Love You (2019)

During this period, he became closely associated with the teen romance genre and was widely recognized among young audiences.

=== 2020–present: Continued work and digital expansion ===
In the 2020s, Rizky Nazar continued to work across film, television, and digital streaming platforms. His involvement in web series and digital content reflects the broader shift in Indonesia's entertainment industry toward streaming-based distribution.

== Acting style and public image ==
Rizky Nazar is often associated with romantic lead roles, particularly in youth-oriented dramas. His on-screen persona has been described as aligning with contemporary trends in Indonesian popular cinema, especially within the romance genre.

== Filmography ==
=== Film ===
- Magic Hour (2015)
- I Love You from 38,000 Ft (2016)
- London Love Story 2 (2017)
- The Way I Love You (2019)

=== Television ===
- Cinta Bersemi di Putih Abu-Abu (2012)
- Pesantren & Rock n' Roll Season 3 (2013)
- Super Puber (2016)
