= Peterpan =

- Birth name: José Fernandes de Paula
- Born: January 21, 1911; Maceió, Brazil
- Died: April 28, 1983 (aged 72); Rio de Janeiro, Brazil
- Occupation: Composer
- Years active: 1930-1980

José Fernandes de Paula better known as Peterpan (Maceió, Brazil 21 January 1911 — Rio de Janeiro, Brazil 28 April 1983) was a Brazilian instrumentalist and composer. His 50-year career began in the 1930s and spanned into the 1980s.
