= Ariel (singer) =

Indonesian singer (born 1981)

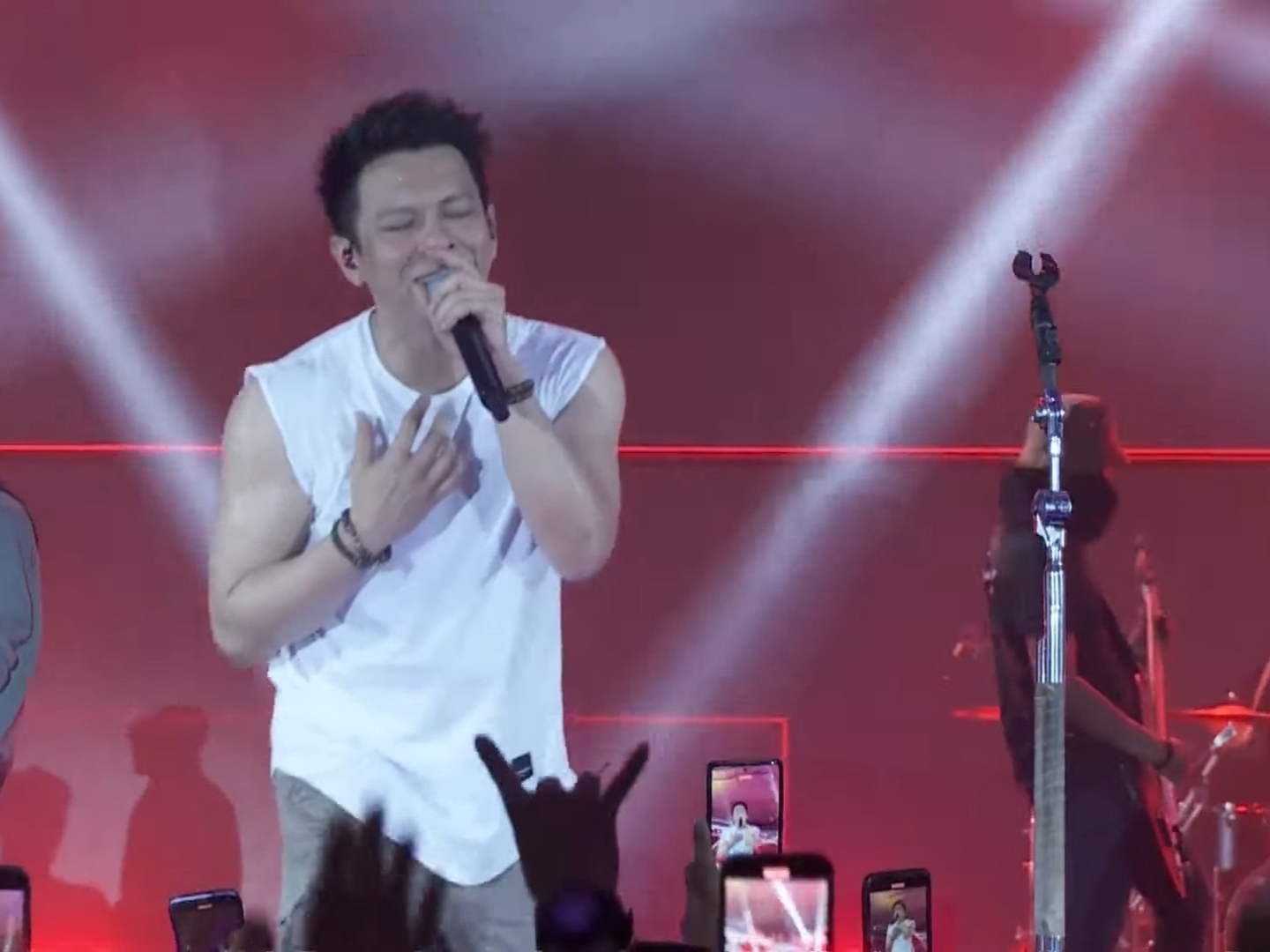
- Ariel performing with Noah in Makassar, November 2022
- Born: Nazril Irham; 16 September 1981 (age 45); Pangkalan Brandan, Langkat Regency, North Sumatra, Indonesia
- Other names: Ariel, Boriel
- Occupations: Singer; songwriter; model; actor
- Spouse: Sarah Amalia (m. 2005; div. 2008)
- Children: 1
- Musical career
- Origin: Bandung, West Java, Indonesia
- Genres: Pop; rock; pop rock; alternative rock; post-grunge; post-Britpop
- Instruments: Vocals; guitar; tambourine; drums; bass; piano
- Years active: 2002–present
- Label: Musica Studios
- Member of: Noah
- Formerly of: Peterpan

Nazril Irham (born 16 September 1981), known professionally as Ariel or Ariel "Noah", is an Indonesian singer of Minangkabau ancestry. He is the lead singer of the Indonesian band Noah, formerly known as Peterpan.

Ariel founded Peterpan in Bandung in 2000 with Andika, Indra, Lukman, Reza, and Uki. Peterpan's second album Bintang di Surga (2004) is one of the best-selling albums of all time in Indonesia. He was arrested in 2010 on charges relating to celebrity sex tapes found circulating on the internet after his laptop was stolen. Peterpan changed their name to Noah after Ariel's release in 2012. Noah also received commercial success, with their first album Seperti Seharusnya (2012) having sold over one million copies.

== Career ==
=== 2000–2008: Peterpan ===
Ariel founded Peterpan in Bandung on 1 September 2000, with Andika (keyboard), Indra (bass), Lukman (guitar), Reza (drum), and Uki (guitar). Their recording career started in 2002 when they recorded their song, "Mimpi Yang Sempurna", for a compilation album by various artists, Kisah 2002 Malam. Afterward, they were contracted by Musica Studio's and under the name Peterpan released three studio albums: Taman Langit, Bintang di Surga, and Hari Yang Cerah; a compilation album titled Sebuah Nama Sebuah Cerita; and a soundtrack album for the film Alexandria.

After Andika and Indra split from the band in 2006, they demanded that their former band change their name. The remaining band members agreed and stopped using the name after 2008. Ariel, Uki, Lukman, Reza, and their new keyboardist, David, planned to announce their new name in 2010, but the plan was put to a halt after Ariel was arrested.

=== 2009–2012: Ariel, Uki, Lukman, Reza, David ===
His band–credited as Ariel, Uki, Lukman, Reza, and David–released an album mostly consisting of instrumental versions of Peterpan's songs titled Suara Lainnya in May 2012. His bandmates routinely visited him in prison while working on the album to get his input. Ariel's 2011 single "Dara" was included as a bonus track in the album.

=== 2012–2023: Noah ===
After Ariel was released from prison, Ariel, Uki, Lukman, Reza, and David announced their new band name: Noah, on 2 August 2012. Noah released their first album under their new name, Seperti Seharusnya, in September 2012. The album was a commercial success, having sold over 1.2 million copies, making it one of the best-selling album in Indonesia. To date, they have released four studio albums: Seperti Seharusnya, Second Chance, Sings Legends, and Keterkaitan Keterikatan.

=== Solo work ===
During his time in prison, Ariel released a solo single titled "Dara". It was released on 18 April 2011.

In 2014, Ariel, along with fellow Musica Studio vocalists Giring Nidji and Momo Geisha, collaborated with fellow Musica Studio's band d'Masiv on the band's single "Esok Kan Bahagia". In the next year, Ariel's vocals were featured in Sheryl Sheinafia's single "Kutunggu Kau Putus", which was nominated for Best Pop Collaboration on 19th Anugerah Musik Indonesia.

Ariel sang two songs from the official album of the 2018 Asian Games. The first was "Bright As The Sun", which was sung by 18 Indonesian singers including Ariel. The second one was "Janger Persahabatan", which was written by Guruh Sukarnoputra and performed by NEV+ (a side project of Nidji, focusing on electronic music), Ariel, and Hivi! former vocalist Dea.

== Musicianship ==
Ariel tried his hand at songwriting during middle school. One of the songs Ariel wrote during high school, titled "Yang Terdalam" (the deepest), received praise from his friends. The positive response drove Ariel to write more songs.

Ariel's musical style was influenced by the grunge band Nirvana ever since his teenage days. Ariel is a fan of Nirvana's vocalist Kurt Cobain.

Ariel's songwriting was influenced by the poet Kahlil Gibran. Ariel was introduced to Gibran's writings in high school and liked the meaning he found behind Gibran's poetry.

== Celebrity sex tape scandal ==
The Bill against Pornography and Pornoaction came into effect in Indonesia in 2008. In June 2010, Ariel was charged with breaking the law by appearing in two sex videos found on the Internet. Ariel claimed the tapes were stolen from his house and posted online without his consent, but the judge argued the pop star did nothing to prevent their widespread distribution.

TV presenter Luna Maya and soap opera star Cut Tari denied being the woman in the videos. However, on 9 July 2011, Cut Tari admitted to being in one of the three sex videos. The confession was made as Cut Tari did not want to preempt the police's investigation into the case. The sex video prompted an outpouring of criticism from conservative Muslims.

Ariel was held in custody from his arrest until his trial, in Bandung, West Java, which began in November 2010. On 31 January 2011, a guilty verdict resulted in three years in prison. The video could also result in prosecution under a law banning adultery, owing to Cut Tari having been married at the time it was made in 2006. The two women were not charged.

On 31 January 2011, Ariel was sentenced to 3 1/2 years behind bars and fined 250 million rupiah (US$28,000). Prosecutors had asked for a five-year sentence. The maximum sentence possible for the charges was 12 years. On 25 April 2011 the Bandung High Court rejected his appeal. On 23 July 2012, after serving two years in prison, Ariel was released early for good behaviour.

The scandal became a popular topic. Communications and Information Technology Minister Tifatul Sembiring engaged in a Twitter debate after suggesting that the possibility of mistaken identity was similar to the Muslim belief that a lookalike of Jesus of Nazareth had been crucified; he stated that the internet could "destroy" the nation.

== Awards and nominations ==
Ariel has received various awards and nominations as a member of Noah, including the Anugerah Musik Indonesia (AMI Awards) for Best of the Best Album for Bintang di Surga, Seperti Seharusnya, and Keterkaitan Keterikatan; and for Best of the Best Production Work for the songs "Bintang di Surga" and "Separuh Aku".

In December 2010, Rolling Stone Indonesia ranked Ariel the 43rd-greatest Indonesian singer on its list of the 50 Greatest Indonesian Singers. In February 2014, the magazine ranked him 28th on its list of the 100 Greatest Indonesian Songwriters.

Award	Year	Work	Category	Result	Ref.
Anugerah Musik Indonesia	2005	"Ada Apa Denganmu"	Best Pop Songwriter	Won	
Anugerah Musik Indonesia	2015	"Seperti Kemarin" (with Dewi Lestari)	Best Pop Songwriter	Nominated	
Anugerah Musik Indonesia	2016	"Kutunggu Kau Putus" (with Sheryl Sheinafia)	Best Collaborative Production Work	Nominated	
Anugerah Musik Indonesia	2020	"Menghapus Jejakmu" (with Bunga Citra Lestari)	Best Collaborative Production Work	Nominated	
Inbox Awards	2012	"Dara"	Most Inbox Video Clip	Won	
Indonesian Movie Awards	2010	Sang Pemimpi	Best New Actor	Nominated	
Indonesian Movie Awards	2010	Sang Pemimpi	Most Favorite New Actor	Nominated	
Johnny Andrean Awards	2010	Ariel Peterpan	Best Hairdo for Male Singer	Won	
SCTV Music Awards	2009	Ariel Peterpan	Favorite Vocalist	Nominated	
SCTV Music Awards	2013	Ariel Noah	Most Popular Band Vocalist	Won	
SCTV Music Awards	2014	Ariel Noah	Most Popular Band Vocalist	Won	
SCTV Music Awards	2015	Ariel Noah	Most Popular Band Vocalist	Nominated	
SCTV Music Awards	2016	"Kutunggu Kau Putus" (with Sheryl Sheinafia)	Most Popular Collaboration	Nominated	

== Singles ==
Year	Title	Album
2011	"Dara"	Non-album single (Note: Included as a bonus track on the compilation album Suara Lainnya by Ariel, Uki, Lukman, Reza, and David.)
2020	"Cinta yang Diam" (with Difki Khalif)	Non-album single
2020	"Lara" (acoustic version) (with Difki Khalif)	Non-album single
2023	"Little Old Man" (new version) (with Caessaria)	Non-album single
2024	"Nada-Nada Cinta" (new version) (with Rossa)	Non-album single

=== As featured artist ===
Year	Title	Album
2014	"Esok Kan Bahagia" (D'Masiv featuring Giring Nidji, Momo Geisha, and Ariel Noah)	Hidup Lebih Indah
2015	"Kutunggu Kau Putus" (Sheryl Sheinafia featuring Ariel Noah)	II
2017	"Bright as the Sun" (as part of Energy18)	Energy of Asia: Official Album of Asian Games 2018
2018	"Janger Persahabatan" (with NEV+ and Dea)	Energy of Asia: Official Album of Asian Games 2018
2019	"Moshimo Mata Itsuka" (with Ariel Nidji)	Non-album single (Note: Included as a bonus track in the CD release of Noah's album Keterkaitan Keterikatan.)
2020	"Menghapus Jejakmu" (Bunga Citra Lestari featuring Ariel Noah)	Non-album single
2020	"Bukannya Aku Takut" (with Mirriam Eka and Difki Khalif)	Non-album single

== Filmography ==
=== Films ===
Year	Title	Role	Notes
2009	Sang Pemimpi	Arai	
2013	NOAH: Awal Semula	Himself	Documentary
2025	Jumbo	Don's father	Voice role
2026	Dilan ITB 1997 †	Dilan	Upcoming release
2026	Dilan Amsterdam †	Dilan	Upcoming release

=== Television series ===
Year	Title	Role	Notes
2015	Tetangga Masa Gitu?	Ginaga Indra / Panda	Guest appearance

=== Music videos ===
- "Pria Idaman Wanita" — The Changcuters (2006)
- "Sedang Ingin Bercinta" — Dewa 19 (2006)
- "Lirih" — Chrisye (2008)

== Endorsement ==
- XL (With Noah)
- Sunsilk
- Lux
- Yamaha
- KFC
- Vaseline men (with Noah)
- Kakao Talk (with Noah)
- Vitamin Water (With Noah)
- BRI (With Noah)
- BRImo
- Greenlight
- Geoff Max
- Gosend
- Kratingdaeng
