= Jikustik =

Indonesian pop rock band

- Origin: Yogyakarta, Indonesia
- Genres: Pop, rock
- Years active: 1996–present
- Labels: Seven Music (2011–2015); Warner Music Indonesia (2000–2011, 2015–present)
- Members: Icha Mirza Hakim; Dadi Nurdin; Adhitya Bagaskara; Carlo Liberianto
- Past members: Pongki Barata; Brian Prasetyoadi; Bayu
- Website: www.jikustikan.com

Jikustik is a pop rock band formed in Yogyakarta, Indonesia in 1996. The group comprises Bassit and Vocal Icha, guitarist Dadi, keyboardist Adhit and drummer Carlo.

Jikustik are known for their hit singles, such as "Seribu Tahun Lamanya", "Malam", "Setia", "Maaf", "Puisi" and "Pulanglah Padanya". The first album titled Seribu Tahun (One Thousand Years), released in 2000.

== Discography ==
Year	Album
1999	Bulan Di Jogja
2000	Seribu Tahun
2001	Seribu Tahun Repackage
2002	Perjalanan Panjang
2003	Sepanjang Musim
2004	Pagi
2005	Kumpulan Terbaik Jikustik
2006	Siang
2008	Malam
2011	Kembali Indah
2014	Live Acoustic
2015	Tetap Berjalan
2023	Rekam/Kenang
