= David Noah =

David
- Born: David Kurnia Albert Dorfel
- Occupations: Musician, singer, songwriter
- Spouse: Gracia Indri (m. 2014; div. 2018)
- Musical career
- Instruments: Keyboard, piano, synthesizer, vocals
- Years active: 2004–present
- Label: Musica Studio's
- Member of: Noah

David Kurnia Albert Dorfel, usually referred to as David Noah, is an Indonesian musician. He is the keyboardist of Indonesian rock band Noah since 2008 after becoming their additional musician in 2006. This position was achieved after undergoing 2 auditions in front of the personnel, as well as being part of the crew and joining Noah's tour for 2 years. David has also collaborated with and wrote song for other musicians, receiving an Anugerah Planet Muzik nomination in 2018 for his collaboration with D'Masiv and Rossa, "Pernah Memiliki", and an Anugerah Musik Indonesia nomination in 2021 for his part in the writing of Stevan Pasaribu's song "Belum Siap Kehilangan".

== Career ==
=== Noah ===
David became Peterpan's (now Noah) additional keyboardist in 2006. According to David, he was invited to jam in a studio and only upon arriving that he was told that he will be auditioning to be Peterpan's keyboardist. Since David was originally a pianist rather than a keyboardist, he learned how to sample the day before the audition and borrowed a keyboard with a sampler from a friend for the audition.

In 2008, David became their official keyboardist. Not long after, Peterpan stopped using that name and temporary performed as Ariel, Uki, Lukman, Reza, and David. Under their temporary name, the band released instrumental album Suara Lainnya. The band announced their new name, Noah, in 2012.

For Noah's first album under that name, Seperti Seharusnya, David wrote two songs with Noah's additional bassist Ihsan. The first is "Separuh Aku", which was released as Noah's first single. The second is "Tak Lagi Sama", which was released as the album's fourth single.

=== Outside Noah ===
David wrote Afgan's 2013 song "Untukmu Aku Bertahan". David wrote the song after Afgan requested a song from him, leading to him coming up with a song about feeling abandoned by a loved one.

Fellow Indonesian band D'Masiv brought David to play on their and Rossa's song "Pernah Memiliki", which was released as a single in April 2018. The reason from D'Masiv is that they want piano to be played on the song, but there was no pianist in their band.

After the 2018 Sunda Strait tsunami killed members of Indonesian band Seventeen, David began to write a song for the surviving vocalist Ifan and get in touch with him. Ifan said that he only found out about the song through a third-party six months after they began contacting each other, because David kept it a secret and wanted to wait until Ifan is ready. The song, titled "Masih Harus di Sini", was released in October 2019 as Ifan's first single after Seventeen's disbandment.

David helped wrote Stevan Pasaribu's 2020 song "Belum Siap Kehilangan" along with Agie Prakasya and Indra The Titans. David was brought into the project by Indra and decided to give the song a more "modern" arrangement. Both Stevan and Indra praised the change that David brought to the song. For his part in the song's writing, David was nominated for Best Pop Song Writer in Anugerah Musik Indonesia 2021 along with the song's other writers.

In 2021, David collaborated with Indonesian singer Christie on her single "Walau Ku Jauh". According to Christie, many Noah fans had asked David to wrote a song for her. The song's arrangement went through several changes by David in order to make it fit Christie's vocals better.

In 2022, David released a single titled "When I'm With You" as an NFT via KunciCoin.

== Outside music ==
On 5 August 2021, David was reported to the police by Lina Yunita for fraud. Lina's representatives said that Lina loaned Rp1.1 billion to David for a ship-construction business, but David did not return the money as dealt. On 13 August, David's lawyer said that David was the communication director in the company so he had no right to return the company's money, and David said that the business project was canceled due to COVID-19 pandemic and other people in the company left him to take care of the debt alone. Lina dropped the charges on 10 September 2021, after David paid back the money in cash without the company's involvement.

== Personal life ==
David Noah married Indonesian actress Gracia Indri on 28 December 2014. They divorced in 2018.

=== Gallstone operation ===
In June 2011, David underwent a gallstone operation operated by Dr. Reno. David fell ill after the operation and it was found out that his bile duct is damaged. On 14 May 2012, David reported Reno to the police for malpractice. After investigation, the police closed the case on 26 November 2012, saying that Reno did everything according to the procedure and what happened to David is a medical risk.

Due to the bile duct damage, David is admitted to a hospital in Singapore for another treatment in November 2012. While recovering from the operation, David is absent from Noah's concert, and the filming for Seperti Seharusnya karaoke DVD. By February 2013, David has rejoined the band, while still in the recovery process.

== Discography ==
- "Pernah Memiliki" (with D'Masiv and Rossa) (2018)
- "Walau Ku Jauh" (with Christie) (2021)
- "When I'm With You" (2022)

== Accolades ==
Award	Year	Category	Nominees	Result	Ref.
SCTV Music Awards	2013	Top Keyboardist	David Noah	Won	
Anugerah Planet Muzik	2018	Best Duo/Group	D'Masiv and Rossa feat. David Noah (for "Pernah Memiliki")	Nominated	
Anugerah Musik Indonesia	2021	Best Pop Song Writer	David Albert, Indra Titans, Agie Prakasya (for "Belum Siap Kehilangan")	Nominated	
