= Cinta Pertama (2006 film) =

- Directed by: Nayato Fio Nuala
- Written by: Titien Wattimena
- Produced by: Ody Mulya Hidayat
- Starring: Bunga Citra Lestari; Ben Joshua; Richard Kevin
- Music by: Addie MS
- Production companies: Maxima Pictures; I-Media Entertainment; Cinema Factory
- Release date: December 7, 2006
- Running time: 115 minutes
- Country: Indonesia
- Language: Indonesian

Cinta Pertama (First Love) is a 2006 Indonesian drama film directed by Nayato Fio Nuala. The film stars Bunga Citra Lestari, Ben Joshua, and Richard Kevin. The soundtrack album, Cinta Pertama, was well received.

== Plot ==
Alya, a 20-year-old woman becomes engaged to Abi, a young businessman. The following day, Abi finds her unconscious, with blood dripping from her nose. Fearful that she has a life-threatening illness, he rushes her to the hospital. As Alya lies in a coma, Abi finds her diary and reads that she still loves her high school sweetheart and first love, Sunny; the two were separated after high school when Sunny left Jakarta for university, without either of them confessing their feelings.

Upon reading his fiancée's diary, Abi decides to search for Sunny and ask him to visit Alya. Sunny, who by that point is already married, agrees after his wife gives him permission. Upon seeing Alya, Sunny's feelings return, and he holds Alya's hand. She wakes up from her coma.

== Cast ==
- Bunga Citra Lestari as Alya
- Ben Joshua as Sunny
- Richard Kevin as Abi

== Production ==
Cinta Pertama was directed by Nayato Fio Nuala, whose previous directing experience was in horror; Hanya Wanita notes that this was evident in some hospital scenes, which were dark and eerie. The script was written by Titien Wattimena.

Bunga Citra Lestari, a first time film actress but long-time sinetron (Indonesian soap opera) actress, was cast for the lead female role. To prepare, she trained with Eka Sitorus. She found the happy scenes to be hardest to act, but was grateful for the workshops and discussions the cast had on set.

Addie MS was chosen to provide the score, with Lestari also providing the vocals for the soundtrack, including the lead song "Sunny", which was written by Dewiq.

== Release and reception ==
Cinta Pertama received wide release on 7 December 2006. It was rated R for remaja, the equivalent of a US PG-13.

Hanya Wanita called Lestari's "touching" (Note: Original: "... mengharukan ...") performance, writing that her emotional struggle showed clearly. The score was praised, with it and the cinematography being compared to other Asian romances.

A song from the soundtrack, "Sunny", was released as a single. It was well received. The soundtrack album, Lestari's first, sold 75,000 copies in the first two weeks.
