= Hari yang Cerah =

Hari Yang Cerah...

Studio album by Peterpan
- Released: May 25, 2007
- Recorded: 2006–2007
- Genres: Pop rock, alternative rock, arena rock, soft rock
- Length: 37:45
- Label: Musica Studios Indonesia

Peterpan chronology
OST. Alexandria (2005)	Hari Yang Cerah... (2007)	Sebuah Nama Sebuah Cerita (2008)

Hari Yang Cerah... is Peterpan's fourth album. The highly anticipated album was released on May 25, 2007. This was their first album without their former members, Andika (Andika Naliputra Wirahardja) and Indra. So far it has four hit singles. (Menghapus Jejakmu, Di Balik Awan, Hari Yang Cerah Untuk Jiwa Yang Sepi, and Cobalah Mengerti).

In 2018, the single "Menghapus Jejakmu" became the subject of public discussion after there was an element of similarity in the song of South Korean boyband iKON "Love Scenario". Although they have similarities, the meanings of the two songs are different. Love scenario tells the story of someone who parted in a good way, without losing their memories of the past. Meanwhile, the meaning of the song erases your tracks which is about someone who wants to forget the memories together in the past

== Noah version ==
Hari Yang Cerah

Studio album by Noah
- Released: January 26, 2022
- Recorded: 2015–2021
- Genres: Pop rock, alternative rock, electronic rock, industrial rock
- Length: 39:04
- Label: Musica Studios Indonesia

Noah chronology
Bintang di Surga (2022)	Hari Yang Cerah (2022)

In 2012, Peterpan changed their name to Noah. Due to several reasons, such as wanting their old song to be released under Noah name, a desire to improve the recordings since some songs were not recorded the way they wished, and in order to properly adapt their old songs to digital format, Noah re-recorded their songs from Peterpan era. Noah's version of Hari yang Cerah was released on 26 January 2022.

== Track listings ==
#	Title	Length
1	Menghapus Jejakmu (Erasing Your Footsteps)	3:05
2	Hari Yang Cerah Untuk Jiwa Yang Sepi (A Sunny Day for a Lonely Soul)	3:58
3	Di Balik Awan (Behind the Clouds)	3:53
4	Kota Mati (A Ghost Town)	3:52
5	Melawan Dunia (Against the World)	3:20
6	Sally Sendiri (The Lonely Sally)	4:17
7	Lihat Langkahku (Look at My Steps)	4:00
8	Bebas (Free)	3:22
9	Cobalah Mengerti (Try to Understand)	4:28
10	Dunia Yang Terlupa (A Forgotten World)	3:30
