= Musica Studios =

Indonesian record label

PT Musica Studios
- Founded: 9 September 1968; 58 years ago (as Metropolitan Studios)
- Founder: Yamin Widjaja
- Distributors: Universal Music Indonesia; Trinity Optima Production; Indie Records
- Genre: Various
- Country of origin: Indonesia
- Location: Jakarta
- Official website: www.musica.id

PT Musica Studios is an Indonesian music company based in Jakarta. Known as Metropolitan Studios in the 1960s and then Musica Studios in the 1970s, Musica was founded by Yamin Widjaja, the owner of an electronics store. Musica is one of the largest music companies in Indonesia. Musical artists such as Noah (formerly known as Peterpan), have recorded on the Musica label.

== History ==
The company from the work of Yamin Widjaja (Amin) as an electronics store owner and record album distributor who opened an outlet in the Pasar Baru area. The electronics store and record distributor was founded in the early 60's under the name Eka Sapta store. Pak Amin Cengli--as he is usually called Yamin Widjaja--accidentally got acquainted with many famous people in the music world, including songs by Bing Slamet, Ireng Maulana, Eteng Tanamal and Idris Sardi. It was this association around music people that eventually became the inspiration for the birth of the band name Eka Sapta.

Amin went further by establishing his own record company. At first he borrowed recording equipment owned by the Remaco company, made recordings in Singapore and built his own recording studio under the name PT Warung Tinggi in the Warung Kopi area of Jakarta. The company initially produced a number of records, including the album Titiek Puspa. This PT Warung Tinggi was the embryo of the establishment of PT Metropolitan Studio on September 9, 1968. At first it produced the recording band Eka Sapta, songs and sounds recorded by Bing Slamet, A. Riyanto and a number of other recordings in the form of LPs (PH) and cassettes.

Along with the success of the recording debut, in October 1971, Amin changed the name of PT Metropolitan Studio to PT Musica Studio in the form of a formal record company establishment deed. Since then, the recording company's software and hardware have been improving, for example from the number of recording studios which were only 2 with 4 tracks each in 1968 to 8 tracks in 1979, growing again to 16 tracks in 1981 and 24 tracks in 1983. Now there are many recording studios located in the PT Musica Studio complex on Jl. Perdatam Pasar Minggu, South Jakarta, opened 5 pieces.

As the largest recording company in Indonesia, Musica Studio immediately innovates in production management, improved human resources and increased production quality of recorded albums. When Yamin Widjaja died in August 1979, his wife Mrs. Lanni Djajanegara along with 4 of her 6 children took over the control, becoming the backbone of the recording 'business empire' of PT. Music Studio. The four sons and daughters are Sendjaja Widjaja, Indrawati Widjaja, Tinawati Widjaja and Effendy Widjaja. Under this quartet of hands-on recording workers, PT Musica Studio has developed into a giant music empire in Indonesia, which has succeeded in bringing young musicians to become famous artists in Indonesia. Prior to that, PT Musica Studio was also supported by other Widjaja families, namely Seniwati Widjaja and Sundari Widjaja.

== Imprints ==
- Musica
- HP Records
- HP Music
- CMM (Cipta Mitra Musik)
- NUR (Nada Utama Records)
- NPS Records
- Maheswara Musik Records (Pop, Rock, and Dangdut specialty label)
- Music Plus
- Siranada
- FireFly Records (indie music specialty label)
- GP Records (Graha Prima Swara)

== Artist ==
=== Bands ===
- Noah
- D'Masiv
- Nidji
- Geisha
- Kahitna
- ZeroSix Park
- The Cartoons
- Satria the Monster
- Stereowall
- Flying Duztman
- Caessaria
- Danzo
- Comics Band
- Most Wasted
- Peraukertas
- Thirteen
- Manusia Aksara
- Black Horses
- Hikayat
- Dreane
- Alessa
- Vierra
- Sweet Charity (Singaporean musical group)

=== Soloists ===
- Iwan Fals
- Iwa-K
- Maizura
- Shakira Jasmine
- Stevan Pasaribu
- Zara Leola
- Giring Ganesha
- Segara
- Ammar Febrian
- Rheno Poetiray
- Adlani Rambe
- Christie
- Difki Khalif
- Rahardian
- Pasha Chrisye
- Amira Othman (Malaysia)
- Yuna (Malaysia)

== See also ==
- Lists of record labels
