= 2012 Dahsyatnya Awards =

Indonesian music awards ceremony in 2012

- Date: January 25, 2012
- Location: Jakarta International Expo, Kemayoran, Central Jakarta
- Hosted by: Raffi Ahmad; Olga Syahputra; Olla Ramlan; Jessica Iskandar; Ayu Ting Ting; Boy William; Pak Tarno

Highlights
- Most awards: Gigi (2)
- Most nominations: Mulan Jameela (3)

Television/radio coverage
- Network: RCTI

The 2012 Dahsyatnya Awards was an awards show for Indonesian musicians. It was the fourth annual show. The show was held on January 25, 2012, at the Jakarta International Expo in Kemayoran, Central Jakarta. The awards show was hosted by Raffi Ahmad, Olga Syahputra, Olla Ramlan, Jessica Iskandar, Ayu Ting Ting, Boy William and Pak Tarno. The awards ceremonies will held theme for "Sebarkan Kedahsyatan Cintamu".

Mulan Jameela led the nominations with three categories, followed by Agnes Monica, Indah Dewi Pertiwi, Syahrini, Afgan, RAN, etc. with two nominations. Gigi was the biggest winner of the night, taking home two awards for Outstanding Legend and Outstanding Video Clip for "Bye Bye".

== Winners and nominees ==
Winners are listed first and highlighted on boldface.

=== SMS ===
Outstanding Song	Outstanding Newcomer
**"Kau Yang Memilih Aku" — Syahrini**; "Abracadabra" — Mulan Jameela (featuring The Law); "Aku Bukan Bang Toyib" — Wali; "Ay" — D'Bagindas; "Cinta dan Benci" — Geisha; "Jodohku" — Anang Hermansyah & Ashanty; "Panah Asmara" — Afgan; "Pemilik Hati" — Armada; "Saat Bahagia" — Ungu (featuring Andien)	**Last Child**; Budi Doremi; Citra Scholastika; Maudy Ayunda; Winner; Yasmine Wildblood
Outstanding Male Solo Singer	Outstanding Female Solo Singer
**Sammy Simorangkir**; Afgan; Ello; Marcell; Petra Sihombing	**Indah Dewi Pertiwi**; Agnes Monica; Andien; Mulan Jameela; Nikita Willy; Syahrini; Vicky Shu
Outstanding Duo/Group Singer	Outstanding Band
**Anang Hermansyah & Ashanty**; Ari Lasso & Ariel Tatum; Project Pop; Raffi Ahmad & Yuni Shara; RAN; T2; The Virgin	**Geisha**; Armada; D'Bagindas; Kahitna; Kotak; Ungu; Vierra; Wali; Zigaz
Outstanding Boyband	Outstanding Girlband
**SM*SH**; Dragon Boyz; Hitz; Max 5; Super 9 Boyz; The Biang K-Rocks; Treeji; XO-IX	**Super Girlies**; 5 Bidadari; 7icons; Blink; Cherrybelle; Sailormoon; Tina with D'Girls
Outstanding Stage Act	Outstanding Guest Host
**Mulan Jameela**; 7icons; Cherrybelle; Indah Dewi Pertiwi; Max 5; Project Pop; Vicky Shu	**Ayu Dewi**; Ade Namnung; Ayu Ting Ting; Denny Cagur; Jessica Iskandar; Jono; Marcel Chandrawinata; Olla Ramlan
Outstanding Child Artist	Outstanding Guest Star
**Lollipop**; 3C; Coboy Junior; Damas; Kiesha Alvaro; Radja Cilik; Umay	**Han Geng**; AC Milan Glories; Anggun; Christian Bautista; David Foster; Destine; Lee Dewyze; McFly; Minami Takahashi
Outstanding Narcissistic	Outstanding Location
**Gamaliel Audrey Cantika**; Chef Aiko; Dadali; Norman Kamaru; Raisa	**Kampus Ukrida, South Tanjung Duren, West Jakarta**; Damkar, North Jakarta; Gegana Brimob, Kelapa Dua, Tangerang, Banten; Kampung P & K Unilever; SMA 1 Tangerang, Tangerang, Banten; Pasar Lokbin Lorong 103, Koja, North Jakarta
Outstanding Enormity of Indonesia	Outstanding Legend
**Sanggar Ayodya Pala**; Asep "Dalang Cilik"; Batiku; Jogja Hip-Hop Foundation; Kampung Seni Yudo Asri; Sanggar Edas Bogor; West Java Art Percussion	**Gigi**
Outstanding Partner
**Voice of America**

=== Jury ===
Outstanding Video Clip	Outstanding Role in Video Clip
**"Bye Bye" — Gigi**; "Indahnya Cinta" — Nidji; "Mau Dibawa Kemana" — Marcell; "Paralyzed" — Agnes Monica; "Sepeda" — RAN	**Vino G Bastian — "Bye Bye" (performed by Gigi)**
Outstanding Video Clip Director	Outstanding Most Diligently Perform Artist
**Ami Guava — "Mau Dibawa Kemana" (performed by Marcell)**	**7icons**
