= 2013 Dahsyatnya Awards =

Indonesian music awards ceremony in 2013

- Date: January 21, 2013
- Location: Jakarta International Expo, Kemayoran, Central Jakarta
- Hosted by: Raffi Ahmad; Olga Syahputra; Ayu Dewi; Denny Cagur; Marcel Chandrawinata; Gisella Anastasia; Melaney Ricardo; Ajun Perwira; Kevin Julio; Olla Ramlan

Highlights
- Most awards: Andien (2)
- Most nominations: Noah (4)

Television/radio coverage
- Network: RCTI

The 2013 Dahsyatnya Awards was an awards show for Indonesian musicians. It was the fifth annual show. The show was held on January 21, 2013, at the Jakarta International Expo in Kemayoran, Central Jakarta. The awards show was hosted by Raffi Ahmad, Olga Syahputra, Ayu Dewi, Denny Cagur, Marcel Chandrawinata, Gisella Anastasia, Melaney Ricardo, Ajun Perwira, Kevin Julio, and Olla Ramlan. The awards ceremonies will held theme for "Wujudkan Kedahsyatan Cinta".

Noah led the nominations with four categories, followed by Ungu with three nominations. Andien was the biggest winner of the night, taking home two awards for Outstanding Video Clip and Outstanding Video Clip Director, both for "Gemilang".

== Winners and nominees ==
Winners are listed first and highlighted on boldface.

=== SMS ===
Outstanding Song	Outstanding Newcomer
**"Love Is You" — Cherrybelle**; "Cukup Tak Lagi" — Geisha; "Harus Terpisah" — Cakra Khan; "Jangan Pergi" — Princess; "Maafkan" — Nikita Willy; "Mabuk Cinta" — Armada; "Seluruh Nafas Ini" — Last Child (featuring Gisella Anastasia); "Separuh Aku" — Noah; "Tak Terkalahkan" — Bondan Prakoso & Fade 2 Black	**JKT48**; Cakra Khan; Da Vinci; Gamma1; Latinka
Outstanding Band	Outstanding Collaboration Duo/Group
**Noah**; Armada; Geisha; Kotak; Setia Band; T.R.I.A.D; Ungu; Vierra; Wali	**Anang Hermansyah & Ashanty**; Bondan Prakoso & Fade 2 Black; Dewi Sandra (featuring Olla Ramlan); Last Child (featuring Gisella Anastasia); Mahadewi; T2; The Virgin
Outstanding Male Solo Singer	Outstanding Female Solo Singer
**Afgan**; Ari Lasso; Budi Doremi; Ello; Judika; Petra Sihombing; Sammy Simorangkir	**Vicky Shu**; Andien; Bunga Citra Lestari; Citra Scholastika; Nikita Willy; Raisa; Syahrini
Outstanding Stage Act	Outstanding Child Artist
**Gavin MJ**; JKT48; Syahrini; Trio Macan; XO-IX	**Coboy Junior**; 3C; Afiqah; Lollipop; Super7; Swittins
Outstanding Location	Outstanding Enormity of Indonesia
**Pasar Bersih Cengkareng, Cengkareng, West Jakarta**; Kampung Kodim 05/04/JS, West Jakarta; Kampung Pocis, Serang, Banten; Pasar Grogol, Grogol, West Jakarta; SMAN 33 Jakarta, Cengkareng, West Jakarta	**Tari Saman SDN Pondok Labu 11**; Tari SD A1 Fath Cirendeu, Tangerang; Komunitas Bambu Bandung; Sanggar Tari (Tari Jejer); Sanggar Tari Rinari; Seruling Bambu Raksasa; Wayang Anggrek; Wayang Hihid Bogor
Outstanding Guest Host	Outstanding Guest Star
**Melaney Ricardo**; Ajun Perwira; Ayu Dewi; Ayu Ting Ting; Chika Jessica; Denny Cagur; Gisella Anastasia; Kevin Julio; Marcel Chandrawinata; Olla Ramlan	**Sam Concepcion**; BtoB; Camryn; Connie Talbot; David Cook; David Foster; Depapepe; Eru; Fabrizio Faniello; Fernando Morientes; Iron Maidens; Rick Price; Scot Alan Marciel; Secondhand Serenade; Simple Plan; Sinclarity; Valerius; Edwin van der Sar
Outstanding Boyband	Outstanding Girlband
**SM*SH**; Dragon Boyz; Fame; Max 5; Motion; Super 9 Boyz; Speed; XO-IX	**Super Girlies**; 7icons; Bexxa; Cherrybelle; Princess; Queen 5; Tina with D'Girls
Outstanding Child Artist	Outstanding Dangdut Singer
**Coboy Junior**; 3C; Afiqah; Lollipop; Super7; Swittins	**Nassar**; Ayu Ting Ting; Duo Racun; Fitri Carlina; Inul Daratista; Julia Perez; Melinda; Trio Macan; Zaskia Gotik
Outstanding Moment
**Olla Ramlan marriage**; Dahsyatnya Car Free Day; Inter Milan Club arrival; Jokowi appointment; Anang Hermansyah-Ashanty marriage; Ayu Dewi marriage

=== Jury ===
Outstanding Video Clip	Outstanding Model Video Clip
**"Gemilang" — Andien**; "Kekasih Terhebat" — Anji; "Indahnya Dirimu" — HiVi!; "Gak Kayak Mantanmu" — Ello; "Seluruh Nafas Ini" — Last Child (featuring Gisella Anastasia); "Aku Bisa Mati" — Latinka; "Sudah Biasa" — Luna Maya; "Akhir Cerita" — Lyla; "Liberty Victory" — Nidji; "Separuh Aku" — Noah; "Sakit Hati" — Piyu; "Kulakukan Semua Untukmu" — RAN; "Ada Cinta" — SM*SH; "Ratu Dihatiku" — T.R.I.A.D; "Sayang" — Ungu	**Gisella Anastasia — "Seluruh Nafas Ini" (performed by Last Child featuring Gisella Anastasia)**; Ariel — "Separuh Aku" (performed by Noah); Dara — "Sayang" (performed by Ungu); Faank — "Nenekku Pahlawanku" (performed by Wali); Giorgino Abraham — "Sakit Hati" (performed by Piyu); Mpok Nori — "Nenekku Pahlawanku" (performed by Wali); Indra Sinaga — "Akhir Cerita" (performed by Lyla); Pasha — "Sayang" (performed by Ungu); Pevita Pearce — "Bunga Terakhir" (performed by Afgan); Pevita Pearce — "Sakit Hati" (performed by Piyu); Tatjana Saphira — "Sayang" (performed by Ungu)
Outstanding Video Clip Director	Outstanding Most Diligently Perform Artist
**Candi Solaeman & Andien — "Gemilang" (performed by Andien)**; Anggur — "Kulakukan Semua Untukmu" (performed by RAN); Eman Pradipta — "Gak Kayak Mantanmu" (performed by Ello); Fajar Bustomi — "Sakit Hati" (performed by Piyu); Ginanti Rona Tembang Asri & Fajar Bustomi — "Kekasih Terhebat" (performed by Anji); Julian Kubik — "Sudah Biasa" (performed by Luna Maya); Nicholas Nicky — "Separuh Aku" (performed by Noah); Sakti Mahendra — "Indahnya Dirimu" (performed by HiVi!); Tepan Kobain — "Ratu Dihatiku" (performed by T.R.I.A.D); Upie Guava — "Sayang" (performed by Ungu); Upie Guava — "Seluruh Nafas Ini" (performed by Last Child featuring Gisella Anastasia); Upie Guava — "Ada Cinta" (performed by SM*SH); Upie Guava — "Liberty Victory" (performed by Nidji); Virlan Warna Langgong — "Akhir Cerita" (performed by Lyla); Virlan Warna Langgong — "Aku Bisa Mati" (performed by Latinka)	**Tina with D'Girls**
