= Dahsyatnya Awards =

Indonesian music awards

- Current: 2018 Dahsyatnya Awards
- Awarded for: Best achievement in the entertainment industry
- Country: Indonesia
- Presented by: Dahsyat
- First award: April 19, 2009
- Website: rcti.tv/dahsyat/awards

Television/radio coverage
- Network: RCTI
- Runtime: 180 minutes

The Dahsyatnya Awards are annual awards presented by the daily Indonesian TV show Dahsyat that airs on RCTI. The show first was held on April 19, 2009.

== Categories ==
The categories in every year are sometimes removed and held again as usual. The categories are based on the voting of the jury and by SMS. In 2014, these categories are presented by social media. The following are the categories of the Dahsyatnya Awards:

=== Jury ===
- Outstanding Video Clip
- Guest Star's Outstandingly Most Diligent Performance
- Outstanding Role in Video Clip
- Outstanding Video Clip Director

=== SMS ===
- Outstanding Song
- Outstanding Male Solo Singer
- Outstanding Female Solo Singer
- Outstanding Newcomer
- Outstanding Band
- Outstanding Duo/Group Singer
- Outstanding Duet/Collaboration
- Outstanding Guest Host
- Outstanding Child Artist
- Outstanding Guest Star
- Outstanding Dangdut Singer
- Outstanding Moment
- Outstanding EDM

=== Social media ===
- Outstanding Couple
- Outstanding Guest Star

=== Retired categories ===
- Outstanding Stage Act
- Outstanding Most Committed Guest Star
- Outstanding Solo Singer
- Outstanding Location
- Outstanding Non-singer Guest Star
- Outstanding Figure
- Outstanding Narcissist
- Outstanding Legend
- Outstanding Partner
- Outstanding Boyband
- Outstanding Girlband
- Outstanding Boyband/Girlband
- Outstanding Enormity of Indonesia
- Outstanding Collaboration Duo/Group
- Outstanding City
- Outstanding Spectators/Community
- Outstanding Choreographer
- Outstanding Hottest Artist
- Outstanding Birthday
- Outstanding Dance

== Host cities ==
Edition	Date	Venue	City	Hosts	Ref.
1st	April 19, 2009	Ancol Dome Carnaval Beach	North Jakarta	Luna Maya, Raffi Ahmad, Olga Syahputra	
2nd	February 26, 2010	JITEC Mangga Dua Square	North Jakarta	Luna Maya, Raffi Ahmad, Olga Syahputra, Ade Namnung, Laura Basuki, Marcel Chandrawinata	
3rd	January 26, 2011	Jakarta International Expo	Central Jakarta	Raffi Ahmad, Olga Syahputra, Marcel Chandrawinata, Denny Cagur, Olla Ramlan, Laura Basuki, Jessica Iskandar, Ade Namnung, Tiffany Orie	
4th	January 25, 2012	Jakarta International Expo	Central Jakarta	Raffi Ahmad, Olga Syahputra, Olla Ramlan, Jessica Iskandar, Ayu Ting Ting, Boy William, Pak Tarno	
5th	January 21, 2013	Jakarta International Expo	Central Jakarta	Raffi Ahmad, Olga Syahputra, Ayu Dewi, Denny Cagur, Marcel Chandrawinata, Giselle Anastasia, Melaney Ricardo, Ajun Perwira, Kevin Julio, Olla Ramlan	
6th	January 21, 2014	Jakarta International Expo	Central Jakarta	Raffi Ahmad, Luna Maya, Olga Syahputra, Ayu Dewi, Denny Cagur	
7th	January 23, 2015	Istora Senayan	Central Jakarta	Raffi Ahmad, Ayu Dewi, Denny Cagur, Nagita Slavina, Marcel Chandrawinata, Syahnaz Sadiqah, Lolita Agustine	
8th	January 25, 2016	Istora Senayan	Central Jakarta	Raffi Ahmad, Denny Cagur, Ayu Dewi, Syahnaz Sadiqah, Lolita Agustine, Mumuk Gomez, Dede Sunandar, Anwar Sanjaya	
9th	January 25, 2017	Ecovention Ocean Ecopark	North Jakarta	Raffi Ahmad, Denny Cagur, Ayu Dewi, Syahnaz Sadiqah, Anwar Sanjaya, Felycia Angelistya	
10th	January 25, 2018	Studio 8 MNC Studio, Kebon Jeruk	West Jakarta	Raffi Ahmad, Denny Cagur, Ayu Dewi, Syahnaz Sadiqah, Dede Sunandar, Bastian Steel	

== List of ceremonies ==
- 2009 Dahsyatnya Awards
- 2010 Dahsyatnya Awards
- 2011 Dahsyatnya Awards
- 2012 Dahsyatnya Awards
- 2013 Dahsyatnya Awards
- 2014 Dahsyatnya Awards
- 2015 Dahsyatnya Awards
- 2016 Dahsyatnya Awards
- 2017 Dahsyatnya Awards
- 2018 Dahsyatnya Awards

== See also ==
- List of Asian television awards
- Music of Indonesia
