= 2011 Dahsyatnya Awards =

Indonesian music awards ceremony in 2011

- Date: January 26, 2011
- Location: Jakarta International Expo, Kemayoran, Central Jakarta
- Hosted by: Raffi Ahmad; Olga Syahputra; Marcel Chandrawinata; Denny Cagur; Olla Ramlan; Laura Basuki; Jessica Iskandar; Ade Namnung; Tiffany Orie

Highlights
- Most nominations: Andien (3); Afgan (3); Marcell (3); Nidji (3); Vierra (3)

Television/radio coverage
- Network: RCTI

The 2011 Dahsyatnya Awards was an awards show for Indonesian musicians. It was the third annual show. It was held on January 26, 2011, at the Jakarta International Expo in Kemayoran, Central Jakarta, and was hosted by Raffi Ahmad, Olga Syahputra, Marcel Chandrawinata, Denny Cagur, Olla Ramlan, Laura Basuki, Jessica Iskandar, Ade Namnung and Tiffany Orie. The awards ceremonies will held theme for "Unlimited".

Afgan, Andien, Marcell, Nidji, and Vierra led the nominations with three categories, followed by Mulan Jameela and Sherina Munaf with two nominations.

== Performers ==
Artist(s)	Song(s)
Main show
SM*SH	"I Heart You"
ST 12; Afgan	"Aku Terjatuh" "Dia Dia Dia"
D'Bagindas	"Empat Mata"
Sherina; Andien; Vidi Aldiano	"Pergilah Kau" "Movin' On "Datang dan Kembali"
The Virgin	"Belahan Jiwa"
Anang Hermansyah; Aurel Hermansyah	"Tanpa Bintang"
Olga Syahputra; Iis Dahlia	"Hancur Hatiku" "Jangan Ganggu Aku"
Vierra; Lyla; D'Masiv	"Jadi Yang Kuinginkan" "Magic" "Semakin"
Raffi Ahmad; Yuni Shara (big screen)	"50 Tahun Lagi"
Andien; Nikita Willy; Tantri Kotak; Sherina; Mitha The Virgin	"Jatuh Cinta"
Kotak; Aroit Juliandri (drawing)	"Masih Cinta" "Pelan-Pelan Saja" "Selalu Cinta"
J-Rocks	"Meraih Mimpi"
Bondan Prakoso & Fade 2 Black	"Ya Sudahlah"

== Presenters ==
- Raffi Ahmad and Olga Syahputra – Presented Outstanding Newcomer
- Raffi Ahmad and Olga Syahputra – Presented Outstanding Stage Act
- Raffi Ahmad and Olga Syahputra – Presented Outstanding Solo Singer
- Jessica Iskandar, Raffi Ahmad and Olga Syahputra – Presented Outstanding Duo/Group Singer
- Franda and Limbad – Presented Outstanding City
- Raffi Ahmad and Olga Syahputra – Presented Outstanding Figure
- Raffi Ahmad, Luna Maya and Olga Syahputra – Presented Outstanding Most Diligently Perform Artist
- Firdaus, Raffi Ahmad and Olga Syahputra – Presented Outstanding Video Clip Director
- Raffi Ahmad and Olga Syahputra – Presented Outstanding Role in Video Clip
- Raffi Ahmad, Luna Maya and Olga Syahputra – Presented Outstanding Song

== Winners and nominees ==
Winners are listed first and highlighted on boldface.

=== SMS ===
Outstanding Song	Outstanding Newcomer
**"Ya Sudahlah" — Bondan Prakoso & Fade 2 Black**; "Jangan memilih Aku" — Anang Hermansyah & Syahrini; "C.I.N.T.A" — D'Bagindas; "Baru Aku Tahu Cinta Itu Apa" — Indah Dewi Pertiwi; "Geregetan" — Sherina; "Aku Padamu" — ST 12; "Percaya Padaku" — Ungu; "Rasa Ini" — Vierra	**D'Bagindas**; Alexa Key; Armada; Calvin Jeremy; Indah Dewi Pertiwi; Nikita Willy
Outstanding Stage Act	Outstanding Band
**J-Rocks**; Kotak; Project Pop; SKJ 94; SM*SH	**Geisha**; D'Masiv; Kotak; Nidji; ST 12; Ungu; Vierra
Outstanding Solo Singer	Outstanding Duo/Group Singer
**Afgan**; Andien; Mulan Jameela; Sandhy Sondoro; Sherina; Vidi Aldiano	**Anang Hermansyah & Syahrini**; Anang Hermansyah & Aurel Hermansyah; Bondan Prakoso & Fade 2 Black; Project Pop; Raffi Ahmad & Yuni Shara; The Virgin
Outstanding Guest Host	Outstanding Location
**Olla Ramlan**; Ade Namnung; Denny Cagur; Franda; Jessica Iskandar; Laura Basuki; Marcel Chandrawinata; Tiffany Orie	**Pasar Kembang Rawa Belong, Kebon Jeruk, West Jakarta**; ITC Cibinong, Bogor, West Java; Kantor Pemadam Kebakaran, Lebak Bulus, South Jakarta; Kampung Pesing Poglar, Daan Mogot, West Jakarta; Pabrik Boneka/PT. Leo Korinsia, Bekasi, West Java; SMU Budi Luhur, Ciledug, Tangerang, Banten
Outstanding City	Outstanding Figure
**Bandung**	**Indonesian national football team**

=== Jury ===
Outstanding Video Clip	Outstanding Role in Video Clip
**"Moving On" — Andien**; "Bawalah Cintaku" — Afgan; "Andai" — Alexa; "Magic" — Lyla; "Terlalu" — Maliq & D'Essentials; "Peri Cintaku" — Marcell; "Cinta Mati III" — Mulan Jameela; "Tuhan Maha Cinta" — Nidji; "Karena Kusuka Dirimu" — RAN; "Rasa Ini" — Vierra	**Lukman Sardi — "Tuhan Maha Cinta" (performed by Nidji)**; Arumi Bachsin — "Peri Cintaku" (performed by Marcell); Manu — "Hari Bersamanya" (performed by Sheila on 7); Marcell — "Peri Cintaku" (performed by Marcell); Pevita Pearce — "Cemburu Menguras Hati" (performed by Vidi Aldiano); Raihaanun — "Mantan Terindah" (performed by Kahitna); RAN — "Karena Kusuka Dirimu" (performed by RAN); Saira Jihan — "Bawalah Cintaku" (performed by Afgan); Shanty — "Waktu Takkan Mampu" (performed by Shanty); Sherina — "Geregetan" (performed by Sherina)
Outstanding Video Clip Director	Outstanding Most Diligently Perform Artist
**Tepan Kobain — "Cinta Mati III" (performed by Mulan Jameela)**; Abimael Gandy — "Rasa Ini" (performed by Vierra); Angga Dwimas Sasongko — "Magic" (performed by Lyla); Angga Dwimas Sasongko — "Karena Kusuka Dirimu" (performed by RAN); A.N.G.G.Y — "Bawalah Cintaku" (performed by Afgan); Dibyo — "Terlalu" (performed by Maliq & D'Essentials); Fajar Bustomi — "Peri Cintaku" (performed by Marcell); Hanung Bramantyo — "Tuhan Maha Cinta" (performed by Nidji); Riyo Wardiarto — "Andai" (performed by Alexa); SIM F — "Moving On" (performed by Andien)	**Alexa**; T.R.I.A.D; Gruvi; Nineball; Lyla; Armada; Pee Wee Gaskins; Indah Dewi Pertiwi
