= 2010 Dahsyatnya Awards =

Indonesian music awards ceremony in 2010

- Date: February 26, 2010
- Location: JITEC Mangga Dua Square, Pademangan, North Jakarta
- Hosted by: Raffi Ahmad; Luna Maya; Olga Syahputra; Ade Namnung; Laura Basuki; Marcel Chandrawinata

Highlights
- Most nominations: D'Masiv (4)

Television/radio coverage
- Network: RCTI

The 2010 Dahsyatnya Awards was an awards show for Indonesian musicians. It was the second annual show. The show was held on February 26, 2010, at the JITEC Mangga Dua Square in Pademangan, North Jakarta. The awards show was hosted by Raffi Ahmad, Luna Maya, Olga Syahputra, Ade Namnung, Laura Basuki, and Marcel Chandrawinata. The awards ceremonies will held theme for "Be Yourself".

D'Masiv led the nominations with four categories, followed by Peterpan, RAN, Vierra with three nominations.

== Winners and nominees ==
Winners are listed first and highlighted on boldface.

=== SMS ===
Outstanding Song	Outstanding Newcomer
**"Hampa Hatiku" — Ungu (featuring Iis Dahlia)**; "Biarkan Jatuh Cinta" — ST 12; "Cari Jodoh" — Wali; "Jika Cinta Dia" — Geisha; "Jangan Menyerah" – D'Masiv; "Sang Mantan" — Nidji; "Separuh Jiwaku Pergi" — Anang Hermansyah; "Superman" — The Lucky Laki	**Vierra**; Geisha; The Lucky Laki; The Dance Company; The Potter's; Zigaz
Outstanding Solo Singer	Outstanding Duo/Group Singer
**Afgan**; Anang Hermansyah; Gita Gutawa; Mulan Jameela; Vidi Aldiano	**The Virgin**; Mahadewi; Maia; Project Pop; RAN
Outstanding Band	Outstanding Stage Act
**ST 12**; D'Masiv; Kangen Band; Kotak; Nidji; Ungu; Wali	**Nidji**; J-Rocks; Kotak; Project Pop; The Changcuters; Sundari Soekotjo
Outstanding Location
**SMA 101, Kembangan, West Jakarta**; Indonesia5 Communication, Kemang, South Jakarta; Kota Wisata Batu, Batu, East Java; MTC Bandung, Bandung, West Java; Pasar Modern BSD, South Tangerang, Banten

=== Jury ===
Outstanding Video Clip	Outstanding Video Clip Director
**"Jangan Menyerah" — D'Masiv**; "Bukan Cinta Manusia Biasa" — Dewa 19; "Tak Ada Yang Abadi" — Peterpan; "Jadi Gila" — RAN; "Dengarkan Curhatku" — Vierra	**Tepan Kobain — "Bukan Cinta Manusia Biasa" (performed by Dewa 19)**; A.N.G.G.Y — "Jangan Menyerah" (performed by D'Masiv); Abimael Gandhi — "Dengarkan Curhatku" (performed by Vierra); Abimael Gandhi — "Jadi Gila" (performed by RAN); Dimas Djayadiningrat — "Tak Ada Yang Abadi" (performed by Peterpan)
Outstanding Role in Video Clip	Outstanding Most Diligently Perform Guest Star
**Stanley — "Bukan Cinta Manusia Biasa" (performed by Dewa 19)**; Ario Bayu — "Kapan Lagi Bilang Lagi I Love You" (performed by Dewi Sandra); Ladya Cheryl — "Tak Ada Yang Abadi" (performed by Peterpan); Peterpan — "Tak Ada Yang Abadi" (performed by Peterpan); Titi Sjuman — "Jujur Aku Tak Sanggup" (performed by Pasto)	**Gruvi**; Alexa; Lyla; Mahkota; Pasto
