= 2015 Dahsyatnya Awards =

Indonesian music awards ceremony in 2015

- Date: January 23, 2015
- Location: Istora Senayan, Tanah Abang, Central Jakarta
- Hosted by: Raffi Ahmad; Ayu Dewi; Denny Cagur; Nagita Slavina; Marcel Chandrawinata; Syahnaz Sadiqah; Lolita Agustine

Highlights
- Most awards: Fatin Shidqia (2); Repvblik (2); Tulus (2)
- Most nominations: Andien (6)

Television/radio coverage
- Network: RCTI

The 2015 Dahsyatnya Awards was an awards show for Indonesian musicians. It was the seventh annual show. The show was held on January 23, 2015, at the Istora Senayan in Tanah Abang, Central Jakarta. The awards show was hosted by Raffi Ahmad, Ayu Dewi, Denny Cagur, Nagita Slavina, Marcel Chandrawinata, Syahnaz Sadiqah, and Lolita Agustine. The awards ceremonies will held theme for "Dahsyatnya Tanpa Batas".

Andien led the nominations with six categories, followed by Noah with five nominations. Fatin Shidqia, Repvblik, and Tulus were the biggest winners of the night, taking home two awards apiece. Shidqia received awards for Outstanding Female Solo Singer and Outstanding Duet/Collaboration (with The Overtunes). Repvblik received awards for Outstanding Band and Outstanding Song for "Selimut Tetangga". Tulus received awards for Outstanding Video Clip and Outstanding Video Clip Director, both for "Baru".

== Performers ==
Artist(s)	Song(s)
Main show
Syahrini; Ayu Ting Ting; Julia Perez	"Cetar" "Geboy Mujair" "Merana"
7 Manusia Harimau Cast
Bastian; Bagas & Difa; Chelsea Idola Cilik; Romaria	"Ini Pilihanku" "Lihat Aku Sekarang" "Best Friend Forever "Malu Sama Kucing"
JKT48	"Papan Penanda Isi Hati"
Teuku Rassya; Aurel Hermansyah	"Jodohku"
Ghaitsa Kenang; Virzha	"Aku Lelakimu"
Anang Hermansyah; Ashanty	"Anakku"
Fatin Shidqia; Indah Nevertari	"Problem"
Geisha; Virzha	"Kamu Jahat"
Raffi Ahmad; Nagita Slavina; Ayu Dewi; Denny Cagur	"Kamulah Takdirku" "Hati Yang Tepat" "Bang Jali"
Repvblik; Zaskia Gotik	"Selimut Tetangga"

Resident DJ

- DJ Una
- DJ Dipha Barus
- DJ Yasmin

== Presenters ==
- Raffi Ahmad, Ayu Dewi, and Denny Cagur – Presented Outstanding Male Solo Singer and Outstanding Female Solo Singer
- Raffi Ahmad, Marcel Chandrawinata, and Lolita Agustine – Presented Outstanding Newcomer
- Raffi Ahmad, Supermerry, Syahnaz Sadiqah, and Denny Cagur – Presented Outstanding Duo/Group
- Raffi Ahmad, Nagita Slavina, Denny Cagur, and Supermerry – Presented Outstanding Moment
- Raffi Ahmad and Nagita Slavina – Presented Outstanding Dangdut Singer and Outstanding Band
- Ayu Ting Ting and Syahrini – Presented Outstanding Couple
- Syahnaz Sadiqah and Marcel Chandrawinata – Presented Outstanding Video Clip
- Raffi Ahmad, Nagita Slavina, Denny Cagur, Ayu Dewi, Syahnaz Sadiqah, Lolita Agustine, Tina Toon, and Supermerry – Presented Outstanding Song

== Winners and nominees ==
Winners are listed first and highlighted on boldface.

=== SMS and social media ===
Outstanding Song	Outstanding Newcomer
**"Selimut Tetangga" — Repvblik**; "Dekat Dihati" — RAN; "Esok Kan Bahagia" — D'Masiv (featuring Ariel Noah, Giring Nidji, Momo Geisha); "Gajah" — Tulus; "Katakan Tidak" — Afgan; "Kaulah Kamuku" — Fatin Shidqia (featuring The Overtunes); "Kuasa-Mu" — Bunga Citra Lestari; "LDR" — Raisa	**Virzha**; Al Ghazali; Husein Alatas; Kunto Aji; Radhini; Real; The Fatima
Outstanding Male Solo Singer	Outstanding Female Solo Singer
**Afgan**; Ari Lasso; Judika; Petra Sihombing; Sammy Simorangkir; Tulus	**Fatin Shidqia**; Andien; Angel Pieters; Bunga Citra Lestari; Citra Scholastika; Gita Gutawa; Maudy Ayunda; Raisa; Syahrini
Outstanding Duet/Collaboration	Outstanding Band
**Fatin Shidqia (featuring The Overtunes)**; Anang Hermansyah & Ashanty; Armand Maulana & Dewi Gita; Mulan Jameela (featuring Mike Mohede); Petra Sihombing (featuring Ben Sihombing); Syahrini & Maruli Tampubolon; The Rain (featuring Endank Soekamti)	**Repvblik**; ADA Band; Armada; Geisha; Kotak; Mahadewa; Maliq & D'Essentials; Superman Is Dead; Wali; Yovie & Nuno
Outstanding Duo/Group	Outstanding Guest Host
**JKT48**; Dewi Dewi; Duo Maia; Mahadewi; RAN; The Overtunes; The Virgin	**Bastian Steel**; Dede Sunandar; Lolita Agustine; Mumuk Gomez; Pica Priscilla
Outstanding Child Artist	Outstanding Guest Star
**Angel Idola Cilik**; Bagas & Difa; Chelsea Idola Cilik; Di Atas Rata Rata; Keisha Alvaro; Romaria; Swittins; Tegar Septian	**Lunafly**; Carpark North; Cowcow; Cyntia; Dash Berlin; Kid David & Salah; LC9; Robert Irwin; Sam Tsui & Kurt Hugo Schneider; Siti Nurhaliza; The Painters Hero
Outstanding Couple	Outstanding Dangdut Singer
**Anang Hermansyah & Ashanty**; Irwansyah & Zaskia Sungkar; Diego Michiels & Julia Perez; Adi Nugroho & Donita; Armand Maulana & Dewi Gita; Denny Cagur & Santi Widihastuti; Raffi Ahmad & Nagita Slavina; Regi Datau & Ayu Dewi; Teuku Wisnu & Shireen Sungkar; Chelsea Olivia & Glenn Alinskie; Alyssa Soebandono & Dude Herlino	**Ayu Ting Ting**; Denny Cagur; Dewi Luna; Julia Perez; Nassar; Siti Badriah; Zaskia Gotik
Outstanding Birthday	Outstanding Moment
**Syahnaz Sadiqah's Birthday**; Ayu Dewi's Birthday; Denny Cagur's Birthday; Luna Maya's Birthday; Raffi Ahmad's Birthday	**Dude Herlino & Alyssa Soebandono marriage**; Ayu Ting Ting bring Bilqis; I'm Gonna Miss You Pica Priscilla; Raffi Ahmad pursuit of love to Nagita Slavina; Anang Hermansyah & Ashanty's baby

=== Jury ===
Outstanding Video Clip	Outstanding Model Video Clip
**"Baru" — Tulus**; "Let It Be My Way" — Andien; "Teristimewa" — Andien; "Sumpah dan Cinta Matiku" — Nidji; "Hero" — Noah; "Ini Cinta" — Noah; "Lapang Dada" — Sheila on 7; "Akhirnya Indah" — The Changcuters; "Gelora Cintaku" — Trio Lestari; "Kumohon" — Afgan	**Fathir Muhammad — "Hero" (performed by Noah)**; Marshall Sastra — "Kumohon" (performed by Afgan); Andien — "Let It Be My Way" (performed by Andien); Andien — "Teristimewa" (performed by Andien); The Changcuters — "Akhirnya Indah" (performed by The Changcuters)
Outstanding Video Clip Director	Outstanding Diligently Perform Artist
**Davy Linggar — "Baru" (performed by Tulus)**; Sakti Mahendra — "Kumohon" (performed by Afgan); Anton Ismael — "Let It Be My Way" (performed by Andien); Sakti Mahendra — "Bayangkan Rasakan" (performed by Maudy Ayunda); Rizal Mantovani — "Sumpah dan Cinta Matiku" (performed by Nidji); Felipe Soares — "Hero" (performed by Noah); Upie Guava — "Ini Cinta" (performed by Noah); Harwan Aconk — "Lapang Dada" (performed by Sheila on 7); MD Hafiz — "Akhirnya Indah" (performed by The Changcuters); Tompi — "Gelora Cintaku" (performed by Trio Lestari)	**Citra Scholastika**; JKT48; Ayu Ting Ting; Angel Pieters; Petra Sihombing; Max 5; Cherrybelle
