= Nickelodeon Indonesia Kids' Choice Awards =

Indonesian annual awards ceremony show

- Country: Indonesia
- Presented by: Nickelodeon and Global TV
- Reward: KCA Blimp
- First award: 2008
- Final award: 2017

Television/radio coverage
- Network: Global TV
- Runtime: Approx. 180 min. including commercials
- Produced by: Victor Setiawan - Anissa Tisnadisastra

The Nickelodeon Indonesia Kids' Choice Awards was the Indonesian version of the American annual awards ceremony Nickelodeon Kids' Choice Awards, produced and aired by Global TV (now GTV). The show was held from 2008 to 2017 in Jakarta. Indonesia is the second country in Asia to hold this awards ceremony after the Philippines.

== Locations and hosts ==
Edition	Date	Venue	City	Theme	Hosts
1st	29 November 2008	Balai Sarbini	South Jakarta	Candylane	Tora Sudiro, Tasya Kamila, Ringgo Agus Rahman
2nd	23 July 2009	Tennis Indoor Senayan	Central Jakarta	Playground Adventure	Raffi Ahmad, Indra Bekti, Fitri Tropica
3rd	9 May 2010	Tennis Indoor Senayan	Central Jakarta	Toyland	Luna Maya, Olga Syahputra, Choky Sitohang, Amel Carla
4th	23 July 2011	Balai Sarbini	South Jakarta	Slime Factory	Tika Panggabean, Yosi Mokalu, Udjo
5th	14 July 2012	Mahaka Kelapa Gading Square	North Jakarta	Planet Slime	Gading Marten, Tarra Budiman, Nikita Willy
6th	14 June 2013	Studio 8 Kebon Jeruk	West Jakarta	Slime Station	Coboy Junior, Ayu Dewi
7th	13 June 2014	Mahaka Kelapa Gading Square	North Jakarta	Slime Banget	Deddy Corbuzier, Nycta Gina, Bastian Steel
8th	10 June 2015	Studio 4 MNCTV, Taman Mini Indonesia Indah	East Jakarta	Slimenya Tuh Disini	Zsa Zsa Utari, Joshua Suherman, Romaria Simbolon, Tissa Biani, Rangga Dewamoela
9th	1 June 2016	Studio 3 MNCTV, Taman Mini Indonesia Indah	East Jakarta	Slime Time Paling Basah	Daniel Mananta, Melody JKT48, Naura Baldy
10th	17 May 2017	Studio 3 MNCTV, Taman Mini Indonesia Indah	East Jakarta	Welcome to the Slime Islands	Conchita Caroline and John Martin

== Winners and nominees ==
Winners are listed on bold.

=== 2008 ===
Favourite Male Singer	Favourite Female Singer
Afgan; Delon; Glenn Fredly; Ari Lasso	Agnes Monica; Gita Gutawa; Cinta Laura; Bunga Citra Lestari
Favourite Actor	Favourite Actress
Dude Herlino; Tora Sudiro; Teuku Wisnu; Raffi Ahmad	Cinta Laura; Marshanda; Shireen Sungkar; Luna Maya
Favourite Cartoon	Favourite Band
SpongeBob SquarePants; Doraemon; Naruto; Avatar: The Last Airbender	The Changcuters; Ungu; Project Pop; D'Masiv
Favourite Athlete	Favourite Presenter
Chris John; Taufik Hidayat; Maria Kristin; Bambang Pamungkas	Daniel Mananta; Ruben Onsu; Indra Bekti; Eko Patrio
Indonesian Star Wannabe Award	Slime Star
Agnes Monica; Cinta Laura; Afgan; Raffi Ahmad	Giring Nidji; Luna Maya

=== 2009 ===
Favourite Male Singer	Favourite Female Singer
Afgan; Ello; Vidi Aldiano; Derby Romero	Gita Gutawa; Agnes Monica; Rossa; Bunga Citra Lestari
Favourite Actor	Favourite Actress
Raffi Ahmad; Adly Fairuz; Teuku Wisnu; Dude Herlino	Luna Maya; Agnes Monica; Shireen Sungkar; Cinta Laura
Favourite Cartoon	Favourite Band
SpongeBob SquarePants; Tom and Jerry; Naruto; Dora the Explorer	Peterpan; Ungu; ST 12; Hijau Daun
Favourite Duo/Group	Favourite Athlete
RAN; Duo Maia; Pasto; T2	Bambang Pamungkas; Taufik Hidayat; Ade Rai; Chris John
Favourite Presenter	Indonesian Star Wannabe Award
Olga Syahputra; Raffi Ahmad; Ruben Onsu; Luna Maya	Afgan; Bunga Citra Lestari; Agnes Monica; Raffi Ahmad
Slime Star
The Changcuters

=== 2010 ===
Favourite Male Singer	Favourite Female Singer
Afgan; Saykoji; Vidi Aldiano; Anang Hermansyah	Gita Gutawa; Agnes Monica; Cinta Laura; Bunga Citra Lestari
Favourite Actor	Favourite Actress
Dude Herlino; Adly Fairuz; Teuku Wisnu; Raffi Ahmad	Nikita Willy; Luna Maya; Shireen Sungkar; Cinta Laura
Favourite Cartoon	Favourite Band
SpongeBob SquarePants; Tom and Jerry; Naruto; Upin & Ipin	Vierra; Ungu; ST 12; D'Masiv
Favourite Duo/Group	Favourite Athlete
RAN; Duo Maia; Pasto; T2	Denny Sumargo; Taufik Hidayat; Bambang Pamungkas; Chris John
Favourite Presenter	Indonesian Star Wannabe Award
Choky Sitohang; Raffi Ahmad; Olga Syahputra	Cinta Laura; Bunga Citra Lestari; Agnes Monica; Choky Sitohang
Slime Star
Agnes Monica

=== 2011 ===
Favourite Male Singer	Favourite Female Singer
Vidi Aldiano; Afgan; Anang Hermansyah; Petra Sihombing	Agnes Monica; Cinta Laura; Gita Gutawa; Sherina Munaf
Favourite Actor	Favourite Actress
Teuku Wisnu; Dude Herlino; Rezky Aditya; Raffi Ahmad	Nikita Willy; Agnes Monica; Shireen Sungkar; Chelsea Olivia
Favourite Cartoon	Favourite Duo/Group/Band
SpongeBob SquarePants; Doraemon; Naruto; Upin & Ipin	SM*SH; Ungu; ST 12; T2
Favourite Athlete	Favourite Presenter
Irfan Bachdim; Taufik Hidayat; Bambang Pamungkas; Cristian Gonzáles	Olga Syahputra; Raffi Ahmad; Choky Sitohang; Indra Bekti
Favourite Comedian	Indonesian Star Wannabe Award
Sule; Olga Syahputra; Komeng; Aziz Gagap	Nikita Willy; Irfan Bachdim; Agnes Monica; Afgan
Slime Star
SM*SH

=== 2012 ===
Favourite Singer	Favourite Band
Budi Doremi; Afgan; Agnes Monica; Ayu Ting Ting	Vierratale; Armada; Ungu; Wali
Favourite Actor/Actress	Favourite Cartoon
Nikita Willy; Rezky Aditya; Teuku Wisnu; Dude Herlino	SpongeBob SquarePants; Doraemon; Naruto; Shaun the Sheep
Favourite Athlete	Favourite Comedian
Taufik Hidayat; Andik Vermansyah; Bambang Pamungkas; Cristian Gonzáles	Sule; Olga Syahputra; Andre Taulany; Aziz Gagap
Favourite Boyband	Favourite Girlband
Coboy Junior; Dragon Boyz; SM*SH; XO-IX	Cherrybelle; 7icons; Blink; Super Girlies
Favourite Child Star	Slime Star
Cinta Kuya; Umay Shahab; Nizam; Baim	Cherrybelle
Big Inspiration
Agnes Monica

=== 2013 ===
Favourite Singer	Favourite Band
Cakra Khan; Agnes Monica; Bunga Citra Lestari; Vidi Aldiano	Noah; Ungu; Vierratale; Wali
Favourite Actress	Favourite Actor
Reza Rahadian; imas Anggara; Dude Herlino; Teuku Wisnu	Citra Kirana; Asmirandah; Bunga Citra Lestari; Nikita Willy
Favourite Cartoon	Favourite Comedian
SpongeBob SquarePants; Doraemon; Naruto; Upin & Ipin	Komeng; Andre Taulany; Olga Syahputra; Sule
Favourite Athlete	Favourite Boyband/Girlband
Chris John; Bambang Pamungkas; Sergio van Dijk; Taufik Hidayat	JKT48; Cherrybelle; Coboy Junior; SM*SH
Favourite Child Star	Slime Star
Coboy Junior; Baim; Cinta Kuya; Nizam	Coboy Junior

=== 2014 ===
Favourite Solo Singer	Favourite Band
Fatin Shidqia; Afgan; Cakra Khan; Raisa	Geisha; Kotak; Noah; Wali
Favourite Actress	Favourite Actor
Pevita Pearce; Alyssa Soebandono; Citra Kirana; Nikita Willy	Adipati Dolken; Dude Herlino; Dimas Anggara; Teuku Wisnu
Favourite Cartoon	Favourite Comedian
SpongeBob SquarePants; Doraemon; Teenage Mutant Ninja Turtles; ~~Upin & Ipin~~ (Note: The Malaysian cartoon Upin & Ipin was disqualified because of fraud, and was replaced the Japanese cartoon Naruto. Upin & Ipin was barred from eligibility for nomination in 2015.)	Denny Cagur; Wendy Cagur; Olga Syahputra; Sule
Favourite Athlete	Favourite Boyband/Girlband
Liliyana Natsir & Tontowi Ahmad; Sean Gelael; Syamsir Alam; Rio Haryanto	JKT48; Cherrybelle; CJR; Blink
Slime Star	Wannabe Award
Fatin Shidqia; Ayu Ting Ting	Bunga Citra Lestari

=== 2015 ===
Favourite Singer	Favourite Group/Band/Duo
Raisa; Afgan; Ayu Ting Ting; Syahrini; Tulus	JKT48; Kotak; Noah; RAN; Wali
Favourite Actress	Favourite Actor
Chelsea Islan; Citra Kirana; Jessica Mila; Prilly Latuconsina; Syahnaz Sadiqah	Joe Taslim; Aliando Syarief; Ammar Zoni; Andi Arsyil; Kevin Julio
Favourite Cartoon	Favourite Host
Naruto; Adit & Sopo Jarwo; Doraemon; SpongeBob SquarePants; Upin & Ipin	Raffi Ahmad; Boy William; Danang & Darto; Gilang Dirgahari; Sule
Favourite Magician	Slime Star
Bow Vernon; Deddy Corbuzier; Demian Aditya; Denny Darko; Limbad	Syahrini; Raisa
Icon of the Year
Syahrini

=== 2016 ===
Favourite Indonesian Song	Favourite Actor
Kesempurnaan Cinta - Rizky Febian; Lagu Galau - Algazali; Pamit - Tulus; Sambalado - Ayu Ting Ting; Tetap Dalam Jiwa - Isyana Sarasvati	Stefan William; Aliando Syarief; Caesar Hito; Reza Rahadian; Ricky Harun
Favourite Actress	Favourite Couple
Natasha Wilona; Chelsea Islan; Jessica Mila; Prilly Latuconsina; Raya Kitty	Raffi Ahmad - Nagita Slavina; Aliando Syarief - Prilly Latuconsina; Chelsea Olivia - Glenn Alinskie; Gading Marten - Gisella Anastasia; Stefan William - Natasha Wilona
Favourite Comedian	Favourite Athlete
Denny Cagur; Cemen; Uus; Sule; Ge Pamungkas	Rio Haryanto; Bambang Pamungkas; Bellaetrix Manuputty; Evan Dimas; Liliyana Natsir - Tontowi Ahmad
Favourite Game	Big Inspiration
Engklek; Lompat tali; Layangan; Ular tangga; Balap karung	Rio Haryanto

=== 2017 ===
Favourite Singer	Favourite Comedian
Tulus; Agnes Monica; Raisa; Afgan Syahreza; NOAH	Denny Cagur; Cak Lontong; Raditya Dika; Sule; Ernest Prakasa
Favourite Presenter	Favourite Movie Star
Omesh; Cak Lontong; Indra Herlambang; Raffi Ahmad; Denny Cagur	Vino Bastian; Chicco Jerikho; Reza Rahadian; Ricky Harun; Bunga Citra Lestari
Favourite Celebrity Family	Favourite Celebgram
Astrid Khairunisha - Uya Kuya; Raffi Ahmad - Nagita Slavina; Herfiza Novianti - Ricky Harun; Anang Hermansyah - Ashanty; Denny Cagur - Santi Widihastuti	Ria Ricis; Edho Zell; Baby Tatan; Reza Oktovian; Salshabilla Adriani
Favourite Comedian	Big Inspiration
Denny Cagur; Cak Lontong; Raditya Dika; Sule; Ernest Prakasa	Reza Rahadian

== See also ==
- List of Asian television awards
