= List of awards and nominations received by Raffi Ahmad =

Raffi Ahmad awards and nominations
Awards and nominations
Award	Wins	Nominations
Anugerah Musik Indonesia	1	2
Bright Awards	4	4
Dahsyatnya Awards	2	10
Global Seru Awards	2	2
Infotainment Awards	2	8
Insert Awards	7	7
Panasonic Awards	7	12
SCTV Awards	1	2
Yahoo OMG! Awards	2	5

Totals (Note: Certain award groups do not simply award one winner. They acknowledge several different recipients, have runners-up, and have third place. Since this is a specific recognition and is different from losing an award, runner-up mentions are considered wins in this award tally. For simplification and to avoid errors, each award in this list has been presumed to have had a prior nomination.)
- Wins: 62
- Nominations: 120

Raffi Ahmad is an Indonesian presenter, actor, and singer. He has been cast in a number of soap operas, television movies, and feature films. He is also involved in advertising and as a host. He has received many awards, including 2 Dahsyatnya Awards, 2 Global Seru Awards, 2 Infotainment Awards, 7 Insert Awards, 2 Nickelodeon Indonesia Kids' Choice Awards, 6 Panasonic Awards, 1 SCTV Awards, and 2 Yahoo! OMG Awards. This is list awards was received by Raffi.

== Ada-Ada Aja Awards ==
The Ada-Ada Aja Awards are an awards ceremony were presented by Global TV and program Ada-Ada Aja for celebrities whose had to be guest star in the Global TV' reality show. Raffi has received one award.

Year	Nominee / work	Award	Result	Ref.
2016	Raffi Ahmad	Most Busiest Artist	Won	

== Anugerah Musik Indonesia ==
The Anugerah Musik Indonesia (English translation: Indonesian Music Awards), is an annual Indonesian major music awards. They have been compared to the American Grammy Awards and British Brit Awards. The award was formalized in 1997 by ASIRI (Association of Indonesia Recording Industry), PAPPRI (Association of Indonesian Singers, Songwriters and Music Record Producers), and KCI (Copyright Office of Indonesia). It is the highest music awards given to outstanding artists in Indonesia.

Year	Nominee / work	Award	Result	Ref.
2011	"50 Tahun Lagi" (feat. Yuni Shara)	Best Collaboration Production Work	Nominated	

== Bintang RPTI Awards ==
Year	Nominee / work	Award	Result	Ref.
2011	Raffi Ahmad	Favorite Presenter	Nominated	—
2012	Raffi Ahmad	Favorite Presenter	Won	—
2013	Raffi Ahmad	Favorite Presenter	Won	—
2014	Raffi Ahmad	Favorite Male Presenter	Won	—
2014	Raffi Ahmad	Favorite Star Advertisement	Nominated	—
2014	Raffi Ahmad	Celebrity Top Rating of the Year	Nominated	—

== Bright Awards ==
The Bright Awards is a giving awards to creative people the world of advertising the country on television advertising are considered the most communicative. This awards show has teamed up with MNC Media and Unity of Indonesian Advertising Companies. Raffi has received four awards.

Year	Nominee / work	Award	Result	Ref.
2016	Raffi Ahmad	Favorite Male Star Advertisement	Won	
2016	Raffi Ahmad	The Brightest Star	Won	
2016	Raffi Ahmad & Nagita Slavina	Favorite Star Advertisement Couple	Won	
2016	Raffi Ahmad & Nagita Slavina	Star Advertisement Couple (based on a survey of television viewers)	Won	

== Dahsyatnya Awards ==
First established in 2009, the Dahsyatnya Awards are an annual awards presented by the daily Indonesian TV show Dahsyat, to honour for musician who to be outstanding in music and entertainment. Raffi was received two awards from 10 nominations.

Year	Nominee / work	Award	Result	Ref.
2011	Raffi Ahmad & Yuni Shara	Outstanding Duo/Group Singer	Nominated	
2012	Raffi Ahmad & Yuni Shara	Outstanding Duo/Group Singer	Nominated	
2014	Raffi Ahmad & Mikha Tambayong	Outstanding Couple	Nominated	
2014	Raffi Ahmad & Syahrini	Outstanding Couple	Nominated	
2014	Raffi Ahmad & Nagita Slavina	Outstanding Couple	Won	
2014	When Raffi Ahmad Back	Outstanding Moment	Won	
2015	Raffi Pursuit of Love to Nagita	Outstanding Moment	Nominated	
2015	Raffi Ahmad's Birthday	Outstanding Birthday	Nominated	
2015	Raffi Ahmad & Nagita Slavina	Outstanding Couple	Nominated	
2016	Raffi Ahmad & Nagita Slavina	Outstanding Couple	Nominated	

== Fokus Selebriti Awards ==
Year	Nominee / work	Award	Result	Ref.
2014	Raffi Ahmad	Focused Male Celebrity	Nominated	
2014	Raffi Ahmad (with Yuni Shara and Wanda Hamidah)	Hottest News	Nominated	
2015	Raffi Ahmad & Nagita Slavina	Hottest News	Won	

== Global Seru Awards ==
The Global Seru Awards are awarded to celebrities who have caught the attention of the public through interesting or exciting accomplishments. Raffi was received two awards.

Year	Nominee / work	Award	Result	Ref.
2014	Raffi Ahmad	Most Exciting Presenter	Won	
2015	Raffi Ahmad	Most Exciting Presenter	Won	

== Inbox Awards ==
The Inbox Awards are an awards ceremony were presented by Indonesian TV program Inbox and SCTV for appreciated for talent in music and entertainment. It is first launched in 2008.

Year	Nominee / work	Award	Result	Ref.
2011	Raffi Ahmad & Yuni Shara	Most Inbox Couple	Nominated	
2012	Raffi Ahmad & Yuni Shara	Most Inbox Couple	Nominated	

== Indonesian Social Media Awards ==
First established on 2016, the Indonesian Social Media Awards are an awards were presented by SCTV to honour for celebrity in social media, which recognized for most exist and favorite. Raffi has received one award from 2 nominations.

Year	Nominee / work	Award	Result	Ref.
2016	Raffi Ahmad	Male Celeb Facebook	Won	
2016	Raffi Ahmad	Male Celeb Twitter	Nominated	

== Indonesian Television Awards ==
The Indonesian Television Awards are an awards were given to talent for appreciated of motivation and innovation in entertainment and program television, based on social media voting. Raffi has received three awards.

Year	Nominee / work	Award	Result	Ref.
2016	Raffi Ahmad	Most Popular Presenter	Won	
2017	Raffi Ahmad	Most Popular Presenter	Won	
2017	Raffi Ahmad & Denny Cagur	Most Popular Duet Presenter	Won	
2018	Raffi Ahmad & Nagita Slavina	The Most Popular Couple of TV Programs	Won	

== Infotainment Awards ==
The Infotainment Awards is an award presented by SCTV since 2012. Raffi has received two awards from 7 nominations.

Year	Nominee / work	Award	Result	Ref.
2012	Raffi Ahmad & Yuni Shara	Most Infotainment Celebrity Couple	Won	
2015	Raffi Ahmad & Nagita Slavina	Most Romantic Celebrity Couple	Nominated	
2015	Raffi Ahmad & Nagita Slavina	Most Phenomenal Celebrity Wedding	Won	
2015	Raffi Ahmad	Celebrity of the Year	Nominated	
2016	Raffi Ahmad	Gorgeous Dad	Nominated	
2016	Raffi Ahmad & Nagita Slavina	Most Romantic Celebrity Couple	Nominated	
2017	Raffi Ahmad	Gorgeous Dad	Nominated	

== Insert Awards ==
Year	Nominee / work	Award	Result	Ref.
2010	Raffi Ahmad & Yuni Shara	Best Celebrity Couple	Won	
2013	Raffi Ahmad	Celebrity of the Decade	Won	
2013	Raffi Ahmad Arrested	The Hottest Celebrity News	Won	
2014	Raffi Ahmad & Nagita Slavina Marriage	The Hottest Celebrity News	Won	
2014	Raffi Ahmad	The Iconic Celebrity	Won	
2014	Raffi Ahmad & Nagita Slavina	Celebrity Couple of the Year	Won	
2015	Raffi Ahmad & Nagita Slavina	VIP of the Year	Won	

== Instagram Awards ==
Year	Nominee / work	Award	Result	Ref.
2017	Raffi Ahmad & Nagita Slavina	Most Interaction Award	Won	
2017	Raffi Ahmad & Nagita Slavina	Top 5 Most Followers	Won	

== JawaPos.com Readers Choice Awards ==
The JawaPos.com Readers Choice Awards was an online awards have first established in 2017 by newspaper Jawa Pos, to honour for public figure in music, film and entertainment.

Year	Nominee / work	Award	Result	Ref.
2017	Raffi Ahmad	Favorite Host	Nominated	

== Mom & Kids Awards ==
Introduced on 2015, the Mom & Kids Awards are an awards to honour for artist in music and entertainment as inspiration to mother and kids. Raffi was received two awards from 6 nominations.

Year	Nominee / work	Award	Result	Ref.
2016	Raffi Ahmad	Favorite Host	Won	
2016	Raffi Ahmad	Favorite Daddy	Nominated	
2016	Raffi Ahmad & Nagita Slavina	Favorite Family	Nominated	
2017	Raffi Ahmad & Nagita Slavina	Favorite Family	Won	
2017	Raffi Ahmad	Favorite Daddy	Nominated	
2017	Raffi Ahmad & Rafathar	Favorite Daddy & Kids	Nominated	

== MTV Indonesia Movie Awards ==
The MTV Indonesia Movie Awards is an awards show in Indonesia, which was established in 1995. The show is based on the United States movie awards, MTV Movie Awards, and celebrates local films and actors.

Year	Nominee / work	Award	Result	Ref.
2007	Love is Cinta	Most Favorite Actor	Nominated	

== Nickelodeon Indonesia Kids' Choice Awards ==
The Nickelodeon Indonesia Kids' Choice Awards is Indonesian version of Nickelodeon Kids' Choice Awards, held since 2008 in Jakarta. Raffi was received three awards from 13 nominations.

Year	Nominee / work	Award	Result	Ref.
2008	Raffi Ahmad	Favorite Actor	Nominated	
2008	Raffi Ahmad	Indonesian Star Wannabe Award	Nominated	
2009	Raffi Ahmad	Favorite Actor	Won	
2009	Raffi Ahmad	Favorite Presenter	Nominated	
2009	Raffi Ahmad	Indonesian Star Wannabe Award	Nominated	
2010	Raffi Ahmad	Favorite Actor	Nominated	
2010	Raffi Ahmad	Favorite Presenter	Nominated	
2011	Raffi Ahmad	Favorite Actor	Nominated	
2011	Raffi Ahmad	Favorite Presenter	Nominated	
2015	Raffi Ahmad	Favorite Host	Won	
2016	Raffi Ahmad & Nagita Slavina	Favorite Television Couple	Won	
2017	Raffi Ahmad & Nagita Slavina	Favorite Family Artist	Nominated	
2017	Raffi Ahmad	Favorite Presenter	Nominated	

== Obsesi Awards ==
Year	Nominee / work	Award	Result	Ref.
2016	Raffi Ahmad	Most Exist Celebrity	Won	

== Panasonic Awards ==
The Panasonic Awards is an award presented to television programs and individuals, based on poll results. The poll was originally conducted by the Indonesian tabloid Citra, but was taken over by Nielsen Media Research in 2004. Raffi was received seven awards from 11 nominations.

Year	Nominee / work	Award	Result	Ref.
2007	Olivia	Favorite Actor	Nominated	
2009	Dahsyat	Favorite Music/Variety Show Presenter	Nominated	
2010	Dahsyat	Favorite Music/Variety Show Presenter	Nominated	
2011	Dahsyat	Favorite Music/Variety Show Presenter	Nominated	
2012	Dahsyat	Favorite Music/Variety Show Presenter	Won	
2013	Dahsyat	Favorite Music/Variety Show Presenter	Won	
2013	Kata Hati	Favorite Entertainment Talkshow Presenter	Won	
2014	Putri Nomor 1	Favorite Actor	Nominated	
2014	Dahsyat	Favorite Entertainment Program Presenter	Won	
2015	Dahsyat	Favorite Music/Variety Show & Entertainment Program Host	Won	
2016	Dahsyat	Favorite Entertainment Program Presenter	Won	
2017	Dahsyat	Favorite Music/Variety Show/Search Talent & Reality Show Program Presenter	Won	

== Pop Awards ==
The Pop Awards is an awards for celebrities which pervasive inspire the younger generation. The show was first held in 2016, which aired on RCTI. Raffi has received two awards.

Year	Nominee / work	Award	Result	Ref.
2016	Raffi Ahmad & Irwansyah	Best Friend Pop Awards	Won	
2016	Raffi Ahmad & Syahnaz Sadiqah	Family Pop Awards	Won	

== Rumpi Awards ==
Year	Nominee / work	Award	Result	Ref.
2016	Happy Show	Excessive Host	Nominated	

== SCTV Awards ==
The SCTV Awards are an annual awards were presented by the Indonesian television station SCTV for talent who recognized of appreciated in music and entertainment, based on audience votes. Raffi has received one award from 2 nominations.

Year	Nominee / work	Award	Result	Ref.
2006	Jurangan Jengkol	Famous Actor	Won	
2007	Romantika Remaja	Famous Actor	Nominated	

== Seleb On News Awards ==
The Seleb On News Awards are an awards ceremony for the celebrities which to be part from the same program show on MNCTV. Raffi has received three awards from 5 nominations.

Year	Nominee / work	Award	Result	Ref.
2016	Raffi Ahmad & Nagita Slavina	Most Wanted Celeb	Won	
2016	Raffi Ahmad	Most Social Media Celeb	Won	
2017	Raffi Ahmad	Favorite Host	Nominated	
2017	Raffi Ahmad	Most Coolest Dad	Won	
2017	Raffi Ahmad & Nagita Slavina	Most Social Media Celeb	Nominated	

== Selebrita Awards ==
The Selebrita Awards are awarded for celebrity who had appreciated in entertainment, based on voted by fans in websites. Raffi has received two awards from 8 nominations.

Year	Nominee / work	Award	Result	Ref.
2015	Raffi Ahmad & Nagita Slavina	Most Celeb Couple	Nominated	
2015	Raffi Ahmad	Most Exist Celeb	Nominated	
2016	Raffi Ahmad	Most Exist Celeb	Nominated	
2016	Raffi Ahmad	Sensational Celeb	Won	
2016	Raffi Ahmad & Nagita Slavina	Most Celeb Couple	Nominated	
2017	Raffi Ahmad & Nagita Slavina	Most Celeb Couple	Won	
2017	Raffi Ahmad	Most Exist Celeb	Nominated	
2017	Dahsyat	Most Celeb Male Presenter	Nominated	

== Silet Awards ==
The Silet Awards are an awards ceremony were established in 2014 and presented by infotainment Silet, to be awarded to the celebrity who had become popular in entertainment. Raffi was received two awards.

Year	Nominee / work	Award	Result	Ref.
2014	Raffi Ahmad & Nagita Slavina	Razored Romance	Won	
2017	RANS	Razored Family	Won	

== Socmed Awards ==
The Socmed Awards is an awards to celebrities and public figures who dominated the popularity of various social media platforms, such as Twitter, Instagram, Blogs, and YouTube. Raffi was received one award.

Year	Nominee / work	Award	Result	Ref.
2016	Raffi Ahmad	Celeb Twit Male	Won	

== Yahoo OMG! Awards ==
Launched in 2012 by Yahoo! Indonesia, the Yahoo! OMG Awards are awarded to honour for celebrity in entertainment, based on online voting in the website. Raffi was received two awards from 5 nominations.

Year	Nominee / work	Award	Result	Ref.
2012	Raffi Ahmad & Yuni Shara	Favorite Couple	Nominated	
2012	Raffi Ahmad	Most Wanted Male	Nominated	
2013	Raffi Ahmad	Most Talked About	Nominated	
2013	Raffi Ahmad	Controversial Celeb Criminal Case	Won	
2014	Raffi Ahmad & Nagita Slavina	Favorite Couple	Won	

== YKS Romantic Awards ==
The YKS Romantic Awards is an awards show presented by Yuk Keep Smile, a TV show which is broadcast on Trans TV. The awards show is held on February 14 every year to coincide with Valentine's Day. Raffi has received one award from 3 nominations.

Year	Nominee / work	Award	Result	Ref.
2014	Raffi Ahmad	Most Shocked Appearance	Won	—
2014	Raffi Ahmad	Most Surprised Artist	Nominated	—
2014	Raffi Ahmad	Most Lulled Artist	Nominated	—

== YouTube Awards ==
Year	Nominee / work	Award	Result	Ref.
2017	Raffi Ahmad & Nagita Slavina	Rans Entertainment Channel Passing 100 000 Subscribers - Silver Play Button	Won	
2018	Raffi Ahmad & Nagita Slavina	Rans Entertainment Channel Passing 1 000 000 Subscribers - Gold Play Button	Won	

== Honor Awards, Magazine, Newspaper ==
=== Bintang Magazine ===
Year	Nominee / work	Award	Result	Ref.
2011	Raffi Ahmad	Most Shining Star	Won	
2012	Raffi Ahmad	Richest Young Celebrity	Won	

=== Intens (Entertainment Program of RCTI) ===
Year	Nominee / work	Award	Result	Ref.
2012	Raffi Ahmad	Most Inspirations Artist	Won	

=== Silet (Entertainment Program of RCTI) ===
Year	Nominee / work	Award	Result	Ref.
2013	Raffi Ahmad	Razored Artist	Won	
