= Timeless (Ungu album) =

Greatest hits album by Ungu
- Released: 9 May 2012
- Recorded: 2002–2012
- Genre: Rock
- Length: 60:18
- Label: Trinity Optima Production Swara Sangkar Emas

Ungu chronology
1000 Kisah Satu Hati (2010)	Timeless (2012)	Ruang Hati (2013)

Singles from Timeless
- 1. "Sayang" Released: May 2012; 2. "Apa Sih Maumu" Released: July 2012; 3. "Kau Anggap Apa" Released: November 2012

Timeless is a greatest hits album by Indonesian band Ungu. It was released on 9 May 2012 by Trinity Optima Production. The album compiled ten songs from six previous studio albums with four newest songs, "Apa Sih Maumu", "Kau Anggap Apa", "Sayang" and "Puing Kenangan". In marketing this album, Ungu and the record label working with KFC that this album would be circulated in all KFC stores in Indonesia.

== Track listing ==
No.	Title	Writer(s)	Length
1.	"Apa Sih Maumu"	Franco Wellyjat M	03:34
2.	"Kau Anggap Apa"	Arlonsy Miraldi	04:32
3.	"Sayang"	Sigit Purnomo	04:11
4.	"Hampa Hatiku"	Sigit Purnomo	03:48
5.	"Demi Waktu"	Franco Wellyjat M	05:06
6.	"Tercipta Untukku (feat. Rossa)"	Arlonsy Miraldi	04:23
7.	"Percaya Padaku"	Sigit Purnomo	03:47
8.	"Kekasih Gelapku"	Franco Wellyjat M	04:43
9.	"Dirimu Satu"	Franco Wellyjat M	03:41
10.	"Karena Dia Kamu"	Arlonsy Miraldi	04:52
11.	"Laguku"	Franco Wellyjat M	04:37
12.	"Cinta Dalam Hati"	Arlonsy Miraldi	04:43
13.	"Berikan Aku Cinta"	Franco Wellyjat M	03:57
14.	"Puing Kenangan"	Franco Wellyjat M & Bryan Takaeluman	04:27
Total length:			60:18
