= RAN (band) =

Indonesian band

- Origin: Jakarta, Indonesia
- Genres: Pop; R&B; hip hop; pop rock; jazz pop
- Years active: 2006–present
- Label: Universal Music Indonesia
- Members: Rayi; Asta; Nino
- Website: www.ranforyourlife.com

RAN is an Indonesian pop rock band formed in Jakarta, Indonesia in November 2006. The group comprises Rayi Putra Rahardjo (vocals/rap), Astono "Asta" Andoko (guitars), and Anindyo "Nino" Baskoro (vocals), the group name taken from the members' initials. Their music combines elements of jazz, R&B, rock, hip-hop, and funk.

They released their debut album, RAN for Your Life, in 2007, from which the successful single "Pandangan Pertama" was taken. They also had a hit with "Dekat di Hati". They have gone on to release four more albums.

In November 2015, they collaborated with Kahitna on the single "Salamku Untuk Kekasihmu Yang Baru".

Putra has also recorded as a solo artist.

== Members ==
- Rayi Putra Rahardjo – vocals, rap vocals (2006–present)
- Astono "Asta" Andoko – guitars (2006–present)
- Anindyo "Nino" Baskoro – vocals (2006–present)

== Discography ==
=== Studio albums ===
Title	Album details
RAN For Your Life	Released: December 2007; Label: Universal Music Indonesia; Formats: CD, digital download
Friday	Released: 13 August 2009; Label: Universal Music Indonesia; Formats: CD, digital download
HOP3	Released: 3 March 2011; Label: Universal Music Indonesia; Formats: CD, digital download
Hari Baru	Released: 18 November 2013; Label: Universal Music Indonesia; Formats: CD, digital download
RAN	Released: 18 November 2016; Label: Orange Records; Formats: CD, digital download

=== Singles ===
Title	Year	Album
"Pandangan Pertama"	2007	RAN For Your Life
"Jadi Gila"	2009	Friday
"Bosan"	2009	Friday
"Karena Kusuka Dirimu"	2009	Friday
"Mencuri Hati"	2011	HOP3
"Sepeda"	2011	HOP3
"Kulakukan Semua Untukmu"	2011	HOP3
"Salah Tingkah"	2012	HOP3
"Hari Baru"	2013	Hari Baru
"Kita Bisa" (featuring Tulus)	2013	Hari Baru
"Begitu Saja"	2014	Hari Baru
"Dekat di Hati"	2014	Hari Baru
"Ombak Asmara"	2016	RAN
"Salamku untuk Kekasihmu yang Baru" (featuring Kahitna)	2016	RAN
"Mager"	2017	RAN
"Melawan Dunia" (featuring Yura)	2017	RAN
"Kokoro Wa Sugu Soba Ni" (心はすぐそばに) ("Dekat di Hati" Japanese version)	2018	Non-album single
"Si Lemah" (with Hindia)	2020	Non-album single

== Awards and nominations ==
Year	Nominee / work	Award	Result
2008	RAN	MTV Indonesia Awards – Most Favourite Band/Group/Duo	Nominated
2008	RAN	MTV Indonesia Awards – Most Favourite Breakthrough Artist	Nominated
2009	RAN	Rolling Stone Indonesia Editors' Choice Awards – Rookie of the Year	Won
2009	RAN	Indonesia Kids' Choice Awards — Favorite Duo/Group	Won
2009	RAN	MTV Indonesia Awards – Best Artist of the Year	Nominated
2009	RAN	Dahsyatnya Awards — Outstanding Duo/Group Singer	Nominated
2009	"Ratu Lebah"	MTV Indonesia Awards – Best Original Soundtrack	Nominated
2010	"T.G.I. Friday"	Indonesian Music Awards — Best R&B Production Work	Won
2010	RAN	Indonesia Kids' Choice Awards — Favorite Duo/Group	Won
2010	RAN	Dahsyatnya Awards — Outstanding Duo/Group Singer	Nominated
2010	"Jadi Gila"	Dahsyatnya Awards — Outstanding Video Clip	Nominated
2011	"Karena Kusuka Dirimu"	Dahsyatnya Awards — Outstanding Video Clip	Nominated
2011	RAN – "Karena Kusuka Dirimu"	Dahsyatnya Awards — Outstanding Role in Video Clip	Nominated
2012	RAN	Planet Muzik Awards — Best Duo/Group & Band	Nominated
2012	RAN	Dahsyatnya Awards — Outstanding Duo/Group Singer	Nominated
2012	"Sepeda"	Dahsyatnya Awards — Outstanding Video Clip	Nominated
2013	"Kulakukan Semua Untukmu"	Dahsyatnya Awards — Outstanding Video Clip	Nominated
2014	"Kita Bisa" (featuring Tulus)	Indonesian Music Awards — Best R&B/Soul Production Work	Nominated
2015	"Dekat di Hati"	Rolling Stone Indonesia Editors' Choice Awards – Hits of the Year	Won
2015	"Dekat di Hati"	Dahsyatnya Awards — Outstanding Song	Nominated
2015	RAN	Mnet Asian Music Awards — Best Asian Artist Indonesia	Won
2015	RAN	Indonesia Kids' Choice Awards — Favorite Group/Band/Duo	Nominated
2015	RAN	Dahsyatnya Awards — Outstanding Duo/Group	Nominated
2017	RAN	Indonesian Music Awards — Best Pop Album	Won
