= RANS Family =

- Genre: Comedy
- Created by: NET.
- Developed by: NET.
- Starring: Raffi Ahmad; Nagita Slavina; Amy Qanita; Rieta Amilia; Denny Cagur; Opie Kumis; Dede Sunandar; Mumuk Gomez
- Country of origin: Indonesia
- No. of seasons: 1
- No. of episodes: 15

Production
- Production location: Jakarta
- Running time: 60 minutes (with commercials)
- Production company: NET.

Original release
- Network: NET.
- Release: October 3 – December 26, 2015

RANS Family is a comedy program that aired in NET. Airing of the date October 3, 2015. Played by Raffi Ahmad, Denny Wahyudi, Opie Kumis, Dede Sunandar, and part of Raffi's family and Nagita's family who had a role in this sitcom.
