= Pasto-1 =

- Origin: Jakarta, Indonesia
- Genres: Pop, rock, R&B
- Years active: 2002–present
- Labels: Sony BMG
- Members: Sion Simbolon; Jason Gunawan
- Past members: Romeltho Sinjal; Mario Hutagalung; Bayu Risa; Rudolph; Rayen Pono

Pasto-1 (formerly known as Pasto) is an Indonesian music group formed in 2002. Its members is 4 people, namely Bayu, Rudolph, Meltho, and Rayen Pono. Starting from various musical performances, one of them is Java Jazz 2006–2007. Pasto was formed through the talent search program Bintang Cari Bintang, aired by Trans TV on 11 November 2002. The name Pasto was initiated by artist Glenn Fredly, which means something that has a tireless spirit.

== History ==
In 2002, Leo Colling, Rudolf DeQueljoe, Bobby, and Rayen Pono joined a vocal group which was called Antero Black and White. Incorporated in Antero Bagus under the tutelage of Chris Pattikawa, this vocal group began to add flight hours by appearing at various events. Until finally "Antero Black" met and became acquainted with Glenn Fredly through Chris Pattikawa.

In early 2003, Dewi Sandra's ex-husband suggested that Antero Black change his name to Pasto and began his adventure under the guidance of Glenn Fredly. The name PASTO was taken by Glenn Fredly from the name of a child from a famous spiritual singer named Viona Paays who was gone. To commemorate her, Glenn named this vocal group PASTO, In another, the name Pasto if separated will be "Pas to?" which means "cocok bukan?" ("Suitable, right?" in English).

In December 2005, Bayu Risakotta joined PASTO, then the PASTO journey continued, this time focusing on completing the first album. In early 2006, precisely from February to May, PASTO had the opportunity to play regularly at BROS Lounge, Grand Kemang Hotel, Jakarta. And this group took part in the Bintang Cari Bintang event on Trans TV and finished third.

Finally, PASTO with the last and complete format until now, Rayen Pono and Romeltho Sinjal continue to struggle with the support of Iman Mawardi. They released the latest single, not from their first album Player. This single created by Fla "Tofu" succeeded in changing the image of PASTO and helped greet the public to 'catch up' on this vocal group.

PASTO was increasingly recognized by people after that, and his awareness increased when they released their latest single, "Aku Pasti Kembali" at the beginning of 2009. The song was a song of Duo Ratu they reproduced.

== Discorded ==
=== Name change to Pasto-1 ===
In 2011, Pasto had again to be abandoned by one of his personnel, Rayen, and Maia Estianty as producer Pasto had denied that this music group disbanding. As Changed Maia auditioned several participants to obtain Mario Hutagalung who filled Pasto's position. This group also changed its name to Pasto-1 by issuing an old single belonging to the Ratu song's, Salahkah Diriku Terlalu Mencintaimu, by Pasto-1 collaborating with singer Milika.

=== Personnel changes ===
In 2016 Pasto-1 was again abandoned by both personnel Meltho and Mario who then made a new vocal group named Paskal and the name Pasto-1 returned with the name PASTO. However, Le Moesiek Revole as the label that overshadowed Pasto stated that Pasto did not disband and would return with a new, fresh concept. This was marked by the joining of two young and talented new personnel. Is Sion Simbolon alumni from the search for young idol talent the first season who will duet with Jason Gunawan. They performed with the single "Ku Tak Sempurna" created by Baliyanto Wahyudi. With this change of personnel, Pasto is expected to continue to color the music scene in Indonesia.
