= Ariel Tatum =

Indonesian actress

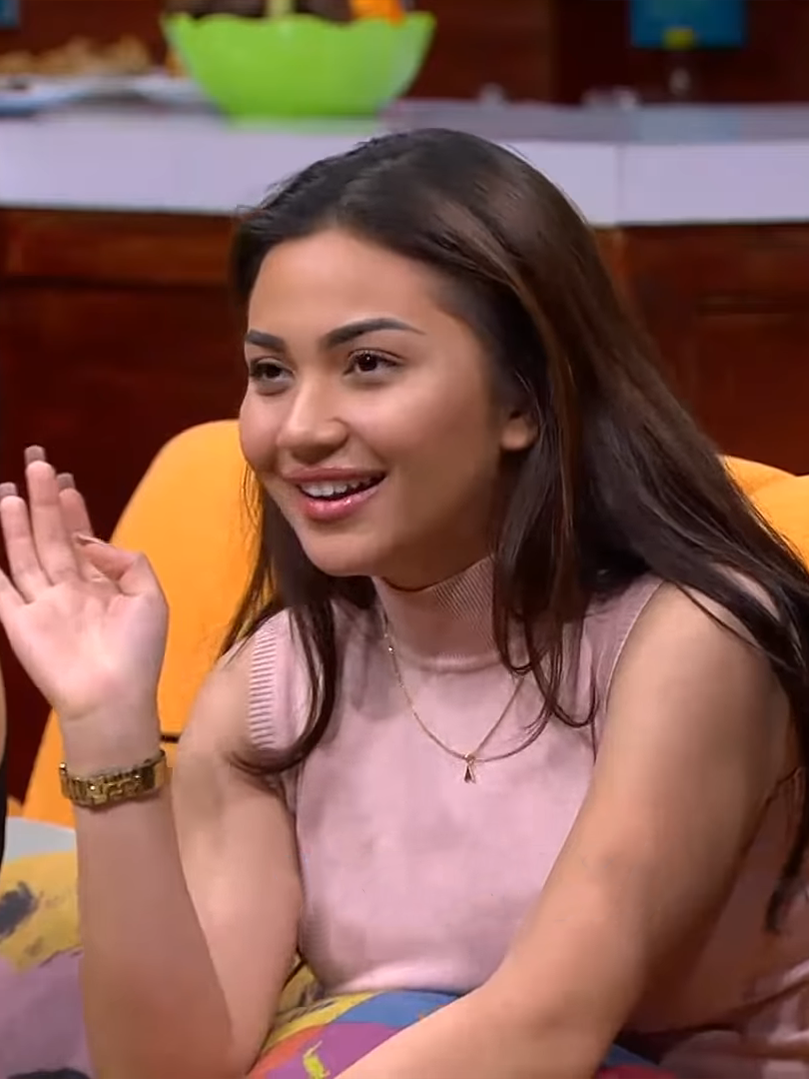
- Ariel Tatum in 2017
- Born: Ariel Dewinta Ayu Sekarini; 8 November 1996 (age 29); Jakarta, Indonesia
- Education: Atma Jaya Catholic University of Indonesia
- Occupations: Actress; model; singer
- Years active: 2004—present
- Family: Murry Koes Plus (grandfather)

Ariel Dewinta Ayu Sekarini (born 8 November 1996), known professionally as Ariel Tatum, is an Indonesian actress, model, and singer.

== Early life ==
Ariel was born with the name Ariel Dewinta Ayu Sekarini, on 8 November 1996 to Rico Valentino Murry and Tatum Mathilda. Ariel explained that her full name is Areil Putri Tari, with the name Tari being a combination of the names of her mother and father. Her father is the son of Murry, a musician who is a member of the Koes Plus music group. Meanwhile, her mother is the daughter of Joice Erna, an actress who won the Citra Award at the 1978 Indonesian Film Festival.

Ariel was homeschooled in junior high school. During high school, she returned to public school at Harapan Ibu Islamic School. However, due to her busy schedule, she returned to homeschooling. Ariel continued her tertiary education at Atma Jaya Catholic University of Indonesia in Jakarta, majoring in psychology, but she chose to resign.

== Career ==
Ariel began her career in the entertainment world by becoming a model for Unilever's Lifebuoy shampoo product advertisement in 2004. Since then, Ariel has starred in several advertisements on television. In 2005, Ariel Tatum starred in her first big screen film which was a family musical drama genre, titled Ariel dan Raja Langit directed by Harry Dagoe Suharyadi.

Ariel also explored the world of singing. In 2011, she was entrusted to be Ari Lasso's duet partner by singing a song called Because I Have Been With You, which was one of the singles from her second compilation album.

On 19 June 2017, Ariel announced a temporary break from appearing on television and social media. During her vacuum, Ariel wanted to focus on managing the social organization of the Community of Children of the Country. This non-profit organization aims to help improve the quality of life of underprivileged children. She returned to the public by appearing on the Sarah Sechan program on 2 November 2017.

In 2018, Ariel played for the first time in a theatrical stage titled Langit 7 Bidadari, which took place at the Garuda Theater, Taman Mini Indonesia Indah, on 1 June 2018.

In 2019, Ariel released another single entitled Until Death after releasing the song Without Words in 2016. This song was written by Ariel herself, who came from personal experience. He also did a duet with Glenn Fredly for the song Coklat, which was one of the songs on Glenn's last album before his death. Glenn said he deliberately made the song to be sung with Ariel.

Ariel is back in films in 2021, starring in the film Done, directed by Tompi, which is showing in Online Cinemas. Not long after that, she was chosen by Garin Nugroho to play the character Binar in the family film "Bicycles of the President" which tells the story of the dreams of Papuan children. She was also chosen for the role of Fatimah in the war drama film directed by Mouly Surya, which was adapted from the novel Jalan Tak Ada Ujung by Mochtar Lubis, entitled City War.
