= Super Girlies =

Indonesian girl group

- Origin: Bandung, West Java, Indonesia
- Genres: Dangdut; Dance-pop; Electropop; J-pop; Teen pop
- Years active: 2011–present
- Label: 18 Musik
- Members: Atu; Kinang; Laras; Mega; Sarah
- Past members: Opie; Rey; Uty; Yui
- Website: 18musik.com

Super Girlies (Japanese: スーパー・ガーリース, lit. 'Sūpā Gārīsu') is an Indonesian girl group formed in 2011. The group is based in Bandung and is composed of Atu, Kinang, Laras, Mega, and Sarah. The former members, Opie, Rey, Uty, and Yui, left to pursue solo projects or retired. The group has been signed to the 18 Musik record label since their formation in 2011. Super Girlies are mainly a dance-pop and J-pop-influenced girl group, with their outfits heavily influenced by Harajuku fashion style. The group also released Dangdut singles, usually cover versions of well-known dangdut songs with teen pop arrangement. After releasing multiple singles since 2011, the group released their first album, Semangat, in 2015.

== Career ==
Super Girlies started their career on 14 February 2011, with their original line-up composed of Atu, Kinang, Laras, Mega, Opie, Sarah and Yui. Their first single, Malu Malu Mau, was released that year. The single was widely criticized on internet forums, especially by Hello! Project fans due to its heavy similarities with a single titled Rival released by Japanese idol girl group Berryz Kobo, a subgroup of Hello! Project. While the music video of the single itself used original concept and direction.

Their second single, Aw Aw Aw, was released near the end of 2011. The single proved to be their most successful single to date and is considered as their signature song, with its music video has gained over 3.7 million views on YouTube. During the making of the music video, Atu was physically unfit and temporarily replaced by Rey for the video shoot. Rey shortly afterwards left the group. Due to its popularity, in 2012 the single was picked as the opening theme of Indonesian teen soap opera Yang Masih di Bawah Umur (English: The Underage) which aired on RCTI, where the group also made cameos in some episodes of it.

On 25 January 2012, the group unexpectedly received the Outstanding Girlband Award at the 2012 Dahsyatnya Awards, beating the likes of already well-known girl groups such as 7icons and Cherrybelle. However on April, the group saw a change of its original line-up, when Yui left the group due to an unspecified health reason, she was then subsequently replaced by Uty. In the middle of 2012, Super Girlies released their third single, Missing You, a remake version of the original soundtrack of Indonesian teen soap opera Cinta Cenat-Cenut 2. Later that year, the group released their fourth single, Hip Hip Hura. The single was originally released by famous Indonesian singer Chrisye in 1985, while the cover version by the group is remade with new J-pop arrangement and feel.
