= Reese's Take 5 =

Candy bar made by The Hershey Company

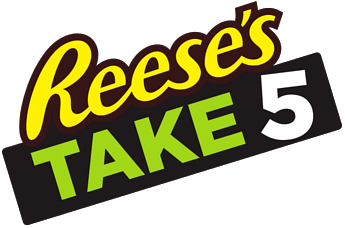

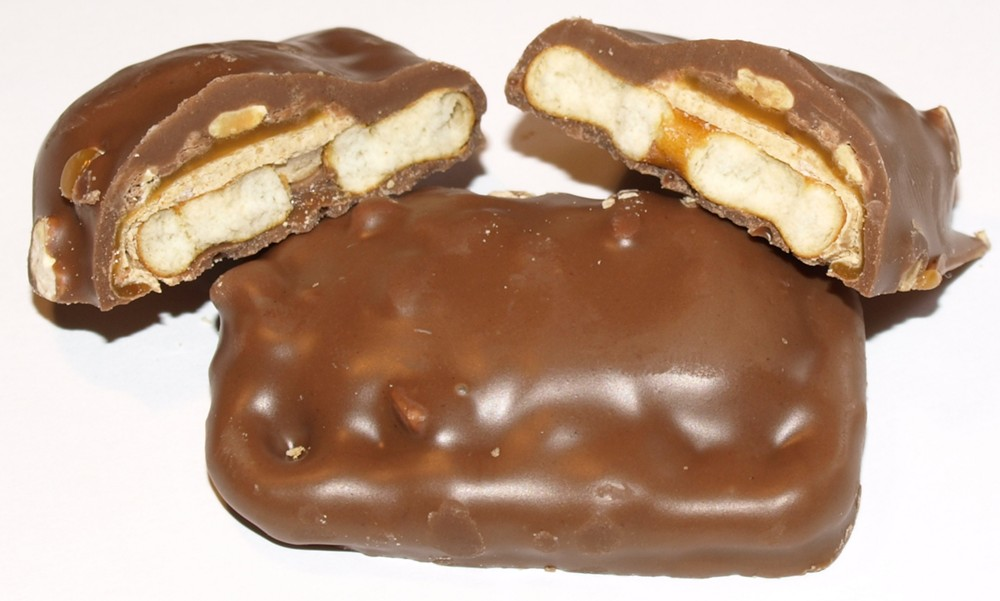
- A sweet and salty candy bar with pretzels, peanut butter, peanuts, and caramel coated in milk chocolate.
- Product type: Chocolate Bar
- Current owner: The Hershey Company
- Produced by: Hershey
- Country: United States
- Introduced: December 2004; 21 years ago
- Related brands: Reese's Peanut Butter Cups
- Ambassador: Milton Hershey
- Tagline: The Best Bar You've Never Heard Of. Everything You Love, Like Nothing You've Ever Tasted.
- Website: hersheyland.com/take5

Reese's Take 5 is a candy bar that was released by The Hershey Company in December 2004. The original name of the candy bar was TAKE5 but common usage among consumers added a space. In June 2019, when the candy bar became part of the Reese's family, the name was officially changed to Reese's Take 5.

The "5" in the name refers to the combination of five ingredients: chocolate, peanuts, caramel, peanut butter, and pretzels. This unique combination of ingredients earned Reese's Take 5 top honors in the 2019 LA Times official candy bar power rankings. The Take5 was known as Max 5 in Canada, was discontinued, and was then returned in Canada in the fall of 2020, under the name "Oh Henry Level Up."

== Product changes ==
Although continuously producing the Take 5 using the original ingredients, The Hershey Company also produced several variations of the Take 5 after its initial release in 2004:

- Chocolate Cookie – Substitutes a chocolate cookie to replace the pretzel
- Marshmallow (limited edition) – Substitutes a marshmallow creme to replace the caramel
- Peanut butter – Has a peanut butter coating instead of milk chocolate
- White chocolate – Has a white chocolate coating instead of milk chocolate

The wrappers for these Take 5 variations show the ingredient substitutions.

At the beginning of 2016, Hershey partnered with a panel of "diverse millennial-aged students" to design a new wrapper and logo for the candy as part of a comeback campaign. (Advertising for Take 5 had been cut in 2011, due to Hershey struggling to find the best way to market the brand.) The new wrapper had a black background with ringed gray stripes and a new lime green logo. According to Take 5's brand manager, the new marketing campaign would focus on targeting millennials. The brand also used Twitter, Facebook, and Tumblr to revitalize its name.

In June 2019, the candy was renamed to Reese's Take 5 and underwent a packaging change, with the primary color of the package changing from black to orange Also in June 2019, Hershey released that the ingredient peanut butter in TAKE5 has always been Reese's Peanut Butter.

Reese's Take 5 is sold as Reese's Overload in the UK

== Formulation changes ==
Take 5 often included cocoa butter, a fat derived from the cocoa bean; however, manufacturing changes were considered as the price for cocoa butter increased from $4,000 to $8,100 per ton in 2008. Staple products such as the Reese's peanut butter cups and Hershey's Kisses were not affected by the price change, but other products from the manufacturer saw a change in their composition when cocoa butter was substituted with cheaper ingredients, such as vegetable and sesame seed oil.

== Nutrition information ==
In September 2016, Hershey led the SmartLabel initiative, becoming the first brand to adopt the Grocery Manufacturers Association's consumer-transparent packaging standard.

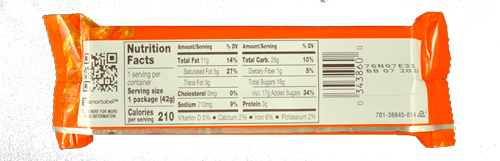
Take 5 Candy Bar Packaging with Ingredients

One serving of Reese's Take 5 chocolate bar contains the following:

- 210 calories,
- Total Fat 11g
  - Saturated fat 5g
  - Trans fat 0g
- Cholesterol 0g
- Total Carbohydrate 26g
  - Dietary fiber 1g
  - Total sugars 18g
    - includes 17g added sugar
- Protein 3g
- Vitamin D 0.1mcg
- Calcium 30mg
- Iron 1.2mg
- Potassium 120mg

== Records ==
On January 31, 2020, the Hershey Company made a gigantic Take 5 chocolate bar that weighs 5,943 pounds. This bar holds the Guinness World Record for largest chocolate nut bar with the size measurements being 9 by 5.5 by 2 feet.
