= Indah Dewi Pertiwi =

- Also known as: IDP
- Born: Indah Dewi Pertiwi; 3 January 1991 (age 35); Bogor, Indonesia
- Genres: Pop
- Occupations: Singer, dancer, artist
- Instruments: Vocal
- Years active: 2010–present
- Label: Keci Music
- Website: www.indahdewipertiwi.com

Indah Dewi Pertiwi (born 3 January 1991) is an Indonesian singer, dancer, and artist. Her first single Baru Aku Tahu Cinta Itu Apa was a commercial success, and her first album Hipnotis released a few months later sold over 2 million copies 18 months after its official release through KFC stores in Indonesia. The Indonesian World Records Museum (MURI) named Hipnotis as the fastest selling CD album in Indonesia, and placed #5 on the list of Indonesian all time best selling albums.

Her follow-up album, Teman Ter-Indah was moderately successful. It included the singles Aku Tak Berdaya and Gerakkan Badanmu, which incorporates elements of tango. An accompanying music video for Gerakkan Badanmu was choreographed by Luam Keflezgy, a choreographer who previously worked with artists such as Beyoncé, Alicia Keys, Britney Spears, and Rihanna. Teman Ter-Indah has since sold around 300,000 copies in Indonesia.

== Modelling career ==
Before becoming a singer, in 2007, Pertiwi was a magazine photo model, using the pseudonym "Nell".

== Discography ==
=== Albums ===
- Hipnotis (2010)
- Senandung Ramadhan (2010)
- Hipnotis, Entertainment Edition (2010)
- Teman Ter-Indah (2012)
- 7icons & Friends (2013)
- KFC Adu Bintang (2013)
- DejaVu (2015)
- Teman Terindah & BFF (2013)

=== Singles ===
- Baru Aku Tahu Cinta Itu Apa (2010)
- Jangan Sedih (2010)
- Gejolak Cinta (feat. Sandhy Sondoro) (2010)
- Hipnotis (2010)
- Aku Tak Berdaya (2012)
- Gerakkan Badanmu (2012)
- Tentang Aku dan Dia (2012)
- Teman Ter-Indah (2012)
- BFF-Teman Terindah (ft. Super7) (2013)
- Kembali Kepadamu (feat. 3Composer) (2014)
- Curiga (2014)
- Dulu (2015)
- Kangen (2015)
- Meninggalkanmu (2015)
- Kasih Tak Sampai (2015)
- Mengapa Cinta (2015)
- Risalah Hati (2015)
- Semua Tak Sama (2015)
- Hidup Yang Sepi (2015)
- Bunga Di Tepi Jalan (2015)
- Semua Jadi Satu (2015) (feat. Richard Schrijver) (bonus track)

== Awards and nominations ==
Title	Year	Awards	Organisation	Result	Refs
Baru Aku Tahu Cinta Itu Apa	2011	Most Outstanding Song	Dahsyatnya Awards	Nominated	—
Indah Dewi Pertiwi	2011	Most Outstanding New Act	Dahsyatnya Awards	Nominated	—
Indah Dewi Pertiwi	2011	Most Outstanding Guest Star on Dahsyat	Dahsyatnya Awards	Nominated	—
Hipnotis	2011	Famous Newcomer Solo Album	SCTV Music Awards	Won	
Teman Ter-Indah	2012	Famous Female Solo Album	SCTV Music Awards	Nominated	—
Indah Dewi Pertiwi	2012	Outstanding Female Solo Singer	Dahsyatnya Awards	Won	
Indah Dewi Pertiwi	2013	Famous Female Solo Singer	SCTV Music Awards	Nominated	—
Teman Ter-Indah	2013	Most Inbox Music Video	Inbox Awards	Won	
