= Vicky Shu =

- Born: Vicky Veranita Yudhasoka Shu; July 8, 1987 (age 39); Cilacap, Indonesia
- Genres: Pop, R&B, pop rock, dance pop, hip hop, soul
- Occupations: Singer, designer
- Instrument: Vocals
- Years active: 2007–present
- Labels: Millionaires Club; VMC Music Entertainment; Mercury Records (Jogjakarta)
- Website: Official Facebook page

Vicky Veranita Yudhasoka Shu (born July 8, 1987) better known by her stage name Vicky Shu is an Indonesian singer who released her debut album, Drink Me, in 2011. Mari Bercinta 2 is a sequel to the same title song by Aura Kasih. The single was number 3 on Dahsyat and number 5 on Klik!. Shu is also designing high heels shoes product under her own brand, named Syu Syu. Before becoming a singer, she was a finalist for Miss Indonesia in 2007.

== Study ==
Shu prioritized her studies, although she had wanted to pursue a career in the entertainment industry since high school. She therefore completed her undergraduate degree in Political Science, majoring in International Relations, at Parahyangan Catholic University in Bandung before entering the entertainment industry. However, she has not yet had the opportunity to apply her degree in the field she studied.

== Awards ==
- The Best Soloist Female Singer of Dahsyatnya Award 2013

== Sources ==
- "Gara-gara Patah Hati, Vicky Shu Datar Terhadap Pria" (in Indonesian). TRIBUNnews. March 7, 2012.
- "Ibunda Vicky Shu: Saya Sudah Cerai dengan Dokter RJ" (in Indonesian). TRIBUNnews. March 16, 2012.
- "Vicky Shu Selamatkan Ibunya Dari Dokter Pelaku Aborsi" (in Indonesian). TRIBUNnews. March 17, 2012.
- "Praktek Aborsi Mahasiswa Terungkap Berkat Seekor Anjing" (in Indonesian). TRIBUNnews. April 2, 2012.
