= Ajun Perwira =

Indonesian actor (born 1988)

- Born: Anak Agung Bagus Perwira Karang; 9 February 1988 (age 38); Denpasar, Bali, Indonesia
- Occupations: Celebrity; Musician
- Years active: 2011 - present
- Spouse: Jennifer Jill Supit (m. 2019)
- Relatives: Umar Lubis (co-brother-in-law)

Anak Agung Bagus Perwira Karang, known as Ajun Perwira (born in Denpasar; 9 February 1988) is an Indonesian actor, and musician.

== Biography ==
=== Personal life ===
Ajun Perwira is the son of Anak Agung Boyke Karang and I Dewa Ayu Widyani. He married Jennifer Jill Armand-Supit on 22 April 2019.

== Television series ==
- Nada Cinta (2011)
- Cinta Sejati (2011 - 2012)
- Segalanya Cinta (2012)
- FTV MD Kupinang Kau Dengan Bis Kota (2012)
- FTV Cinta Hingga Akhir Waktu
- FTV MD Love in Warteg (2013)
- Kinara (2013, with Mikha Tambayong)

== Filmography ==
- Di Bawah Lindungan Ka'bah (2011)
- Poconggg Juga Pocong (2011)
- Pocong Kesetanan (2011)
- My Last Love (2012)
- Love is Brondong (2012)
- Bila (2012)
- 3 Pocong Idiot (2012)
- Get M4rried (2013)
- Ghost Diary (2016)

== Presenter ==
- JKT48 2nd Generation Audition (RCTI)
- Dahsyat (RCTI)
- Ceplas Ceplos (Trans 7)
