= Ungu =

Indonesian pop rock band

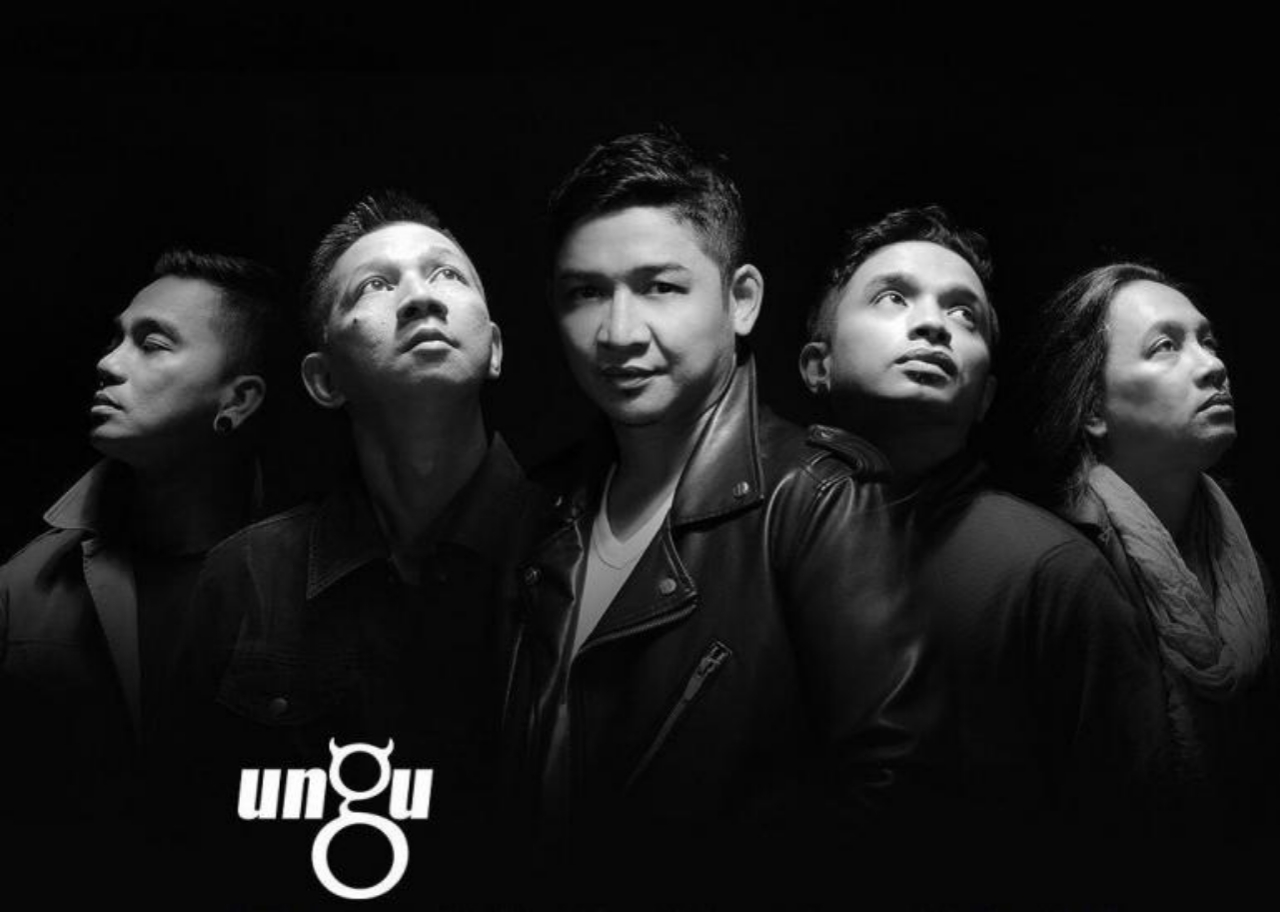

Background information
- Origin: Jakarta, Indonesia
- Genres: Alternative rock; pop rock; pop
- Years active: 1996–present
- Labels: Sony BMG Music Entertainment; Sony Music Entertainment Indonesia; Universal Music Indonesia; Warner Music Indonesia (1999–2001); Hemaswara Record / Musica Studios (2002–2005); Trinity Optima Production (2005–present)
- Members: Sigit Purnomo Said (Pasha); Franco w.m. Kusumah (Enda); Arlonsy Miraldi (Onci); Makki O. Parikesit (Makki); Muh. Nur Rowman (Rowman)
- Past members: Mikel Pattiradjawane; Franky Hediakto; Bambang Ari Nugroho; Gatot Kies; Pasha A. Firmansyah; Richard Jerome
- Website: www.unguband.com www.xneet.id

Ungu (lit. 'Purple') is an Indonesian rock band formed in Jakarta in 1996. Its previous names were Glasses (1992–1995) and Glover (1995–1996). The group currently comprises vocalist Pasha, guitarists Enda and Onci, bassist Makki, and drummer Rowman. They are widely recognized as one of the most successful and influential pop-rock bands in Indonesia, enjoying immense popularity not only in their home country but also across neighboring Southeast Asian countries.

Ungu is highly known for their hit romantic singles, such as "Demi Waktu", "Tercipta Untukku", "Andai Ku Tahu", and "Kekasih Gelapku". They are also celebrated for popularizing the modern Islamic pop-religious music genre in Indonesia during the holy month of Ramadan.

== History ==
=== Early years and breakthrough (1996–2005) ===
Formed in 1996, the band underwent several lineup changes during its early years before solidifying the current roster. Ungu released their debut studio album, Laguku, in 2002, which featured the hit single "Bayang Semu" (False Shadow). The single became popular as the soundtrack for a widely watched Indonesian soap opera, introducing the band to a broader audience. In 2003, they released their sophomore album, Tempat Terindah.

The band's career skyrocketed in 2005 with the release of their third studio album, Melayang. The lead single, "Demi Waktu" (For the Sake of Time), became a massive commercial success. Ungu gained mainstream popularity in Malaysia around 2006 with the release of this single, dominating radio airwaves and music charts in both Indonesia and Malaysia.

=== Commercial peak and religious albums (2006–2015) ===
In 2006, to coincide with the Islamic holy month of Ramadan, Ungu released a mini religious album titled SurgaMu (Your Heaven). The album was critically acclaimed and highly successful commercially, cementing a new tradition for the band to release religious-themed mini-albums annually or biennially, such as Para Pencari Mu (2007) and Aku dan Tuhanku (2008).

The band continued to release highly successful pop-rock studio albums, including Untukmu Selamanya (2007), Penguasa Hati (2009), and 1000 Kisah Satu Hati (2010), winning multiple prestigious music awards in Indonesia, including the Anugerah Musik Indonesia (AMI Awards).

=== Political involvement and recent years (2016–present) ===
In February 2016, lead vocalist Pasha was elected as the Deputy Mayor of Palu, Central Sulawesi. Despite public speculation regarding the band's future, Pasha confirmed he remained a member of Ungu. During his term in office, the band adjusted its activities; the vocalist position was temporarily filled by guitarists Enda and Onci during live performances, and the band occasionally released singles rather than full-length albums. Following the end of his political term in 2021, Pasha returned to actively touring and producing music with Ungu.

== Musical style ==
Ungu's musical style is primarily rooted in pop rock and alternative rock. They are widely known for their melancholic, guitar-driven rock ballads that appeal to a wide demographic. In addition to their pop-rock roots, they have heavily influenced the Indonesian music industry by merging standard pop-rock instrumentation with Islamic spiritual lyrics, often incorporating orchestral arrangements and traditional Middle Eastern elements in their religious tracks.

== Discography ==
Studio Albums

- Laguku (2002)
- Tempat Terindah (2003)
- Melayang (2005)
- Untukmu Selamanya (2007)
- Penguasa Hati (2009)
- 1000 Kisah Satu Hati (2010)
- Timeless (2012)
- Mozaik (2015)
- Ungu (2022)

Religious Albums / EPs

- SurgaMu (2006)
- Para Pencari Mu (2007)
- Aku dan Tuhanku (2008)
- Maha Besar (2009)
- Ruang Hati (2013)
- Top Hits Religi Ungu (2020)

== History ==
=== Formation and early years (1996–2002) ===
The band's origins date back to 1992 under the name Glasses, which later changed to Glover in 1995. In 1996, the name Ungu was officially adopted upon the suggestion of bassist Makki Parikesit. After years of performing in the Jakarta underground and cafe circuit, the band signed with Warner Music Indonesia. Their debut album, Laguku (2002), was a major success; the title track "Laguku" became a nationwide hit and earned the band their first Platinum Award.

=== Mainstream peak and regional breakthrough (2005–2010) ===
Ungu reached the pinnacle of their career with the release of their third album, Melayang (2005). The lead single, "Demi Waktu," became a massive phenomenon across the Malay-speaking world, dominating radio charts in both Indonesia and Malaysia for months. This era saw the addition of Onci as a second guitarist, which solidified the band's signature pop-rock sound.

In 2006, Ungu released the mini-album SurgaMu, a religious project intended for the month of Ramadan. It became a cultural milestone, selling over 150,000 copies in its first few days and earning praise from the President of Indonesia for its positive influence. This established Ungu as the leading pioneers of the "pop-religi" trend that became a staple of the Indonesian music industry.

=== Pasha's political career and hiatus (2016–2021) ===
In February 2016, lead singer Pasha was elected as the Deputy Mayor of Palu, Central Sulawesi. Despite concerns that the band would disband, they remained active. During Pasha's five-year term in office, guitarists Enda and Onci took over lead vocal duties for live performances. Pasha continued to record with the band during his breaks, including the release of several singles and the album Setengah Gila (2017).

=== Return to full activity (2021–present) ===
Following the completion of Pasha's political term in 2021, the band reunited in full capacity. They released a self-titled album, Ungu, in 2022 to celebrate their longevity in the industry. As of 2026, the band continues to tour extensively and remains a headline act at major festivals across Southeast Asia.

== Awards and nominations ==
Throughout their career, Ungu has received numerous accolades, including multiple AMI Awards (Anugerah Musik Indonesia), MTV Indonesia Awards, and Anugerah Industri Muzik (AIM) in Malaysia. Their 2005 hit "Demi Waktu" remains one of the most played Indonesian songs of all time.

== History ==
=== Formation and early years (1995–1999) ===
Before becoming Ungu, the initial formation of Glover consisted of guitarist Ekky, bassist Herry, drummer Pasha Akbar Firmasnyah and vocalist Ariyo Wahab. In 1996 Ariyo Wahab and Herry Surya left the band to be replaced by Michael Pattiradjawane and Makki Parikesit. The reason the name Glover is changed to Ungu. In 1997 Pasha Akbar also left the band to be replaced by Bambang Ari Nugroho. In 1998 Bambang Ari Nugroho also left the band to be replaced by Richard Jerome. In 1999 Pasha and Getz joined forces. Pasha entered to replace Michael, then in 2001 Enda and Rowman joined, Rowman replaced Richard.

=== Laguku (2000–2002) ===
In 2000, Ungu focused efforts on their debut album. Ungu has also released "Hasrat" and "Bunga" for a compilation album, Klik.

Ungu released their first full-length album, Laguku on July 6, 2002. Their first single "Bayang Semu" was used for a soundtrack in ABG (RCTI). Even though the album was considered success, it reached Platinum Award after two years of its release date.

=== Tempat Terindah (2002–2005) ===
Just before starting the new album, Ekky decided to leave the band in 2003. His position was replaced by Onci who had just left Funky Kopral.

Ungu released its second album Tempat Terindah in December 2003. The album spawned a hit single "Karena Dia Kamu" and "Suara Hati". The album sold 150,000 copies.

Ungu has also collaborated with Chrisye in his 2004 album, Senyawa.

=== Melayang (2005–2007) ===
Ungu successfully recorded new materials for their next album in 2005 and released their next album Melayang in December 2005 in Indonesia alone.

This new album had put Ungu into the spotlight with their hit single "Demi Waktu". The single received massive airplay in both Indonesia and Malaysia which causes 4 record labels in Malaysia to own Ungu's copyright to distribute the album in Malaysia. Malaysian's Suria Records who owns Siti Nurhaliza, won the copyright. The album received good reviews from both Malaysian and Indonesian critics. With the successful airplay from another hits likes Seperti Yang Dulu, Tercipta Untukku, Sejauh Mungkin, and Aku Bukan Pilihan Hatimu, this album received a double platinum certification.

=== Other albums and activity (2005–present) ===
Ungu released a mini album, SurgaMu to celebrate Ramadhan in December 2006. 150,000 copies sold in 15 days. The album received an inspiring recognition from Yusuf Kalla but the band didn't receive it as the band's appearance in Presidential Palace, didn't follow the correct procession protocol.

In 2006, Ungu was nominated for Most Favorite Band/Duo in 2006 MTV Indonesia Awards, Best Video Director "Demi Waktu" Abimael Gandy and Video of the Year "Demi Waktu".

In 2012, Ungu released a compilation album, Timeless. The album was only sold at KFC outlets in Indonesia, and has sold 500.000 in two month. The album compiled top hit singles and four new songs, "Apa Sih Maumu", "Kau Anggap Apa", "Sayang" and "Puing Kenangan". Ungu also includes musicians who merged their albums sold in KFC stores like Cinta Laura, Indah Dewi Pertiwi, Noah, Agnes Monica, SM*SH, T.R.I.A.D, Rossa, Slank, Last Child, Ello, Sammy Simorangkir and Armada.

In 2015, Ungu launched an album called Mozaik. Released on March 18, 2015. This album featuring 2 singles is "Terbaik" and "Aku Tahu". This album feels different from their previous albums, because this album has various musical genres in each song. This album is only sold in all KFC outlets in Indonesia. On July 7, 2015, the Mozaik album received a multiplatinum award for selling more than 200 thousand copies.

In 2015, main vocalist Pasha announced that he will become a candidate to being a Vice Major of Palu in the 2015 simultaneous regional head election alongside major candidate Hidayat. They currently have the most votes.

== Case ==
=== Riots on concerts ===
During a concert in Mojokerto, East Java, on March 30, 2006, dozens of female fans fainted. Nine months later, on December 19, 2006, the concert "Popcoholic with Purple" at Widya Mandala Krida Stadium, Kedungwuni, Pekalongan ended in riots that resulted in 10 deaths and six others seriously injured because of being trampled and lack of oxygen when tens of thousands crowded out after watching their concert.

== Band members ==
Current members

- Makki Omar Parikesit — bass guitar, occasional backing vocals (1996–present)
- M. Nur "Rowman" Rohman — drums, occasional backing vocals (2001–present)
- Sigit Purnomo Syamsuddin "Pasha" Said — lead vocals (1999–present) inactive (2016-2021)
- Franco "Enda" Medjaya — guitar (2001–present), vocals (Note: Enda and Onci fill Pasha's position as vocalists for a while since he served as Deputy Mayor.) (2016–present)
- Arlonsy "Onci" Miraldi — guitar (2003–present), vocals (2016–present)

Additional Members

- Peter Lawdenk - keyboards piano, backing vocals (2025-Now)

Former members & Additional Members

- Pasha Akbar Firmansyah — drums (1996–1997)
- Michael Pattiradjawane — vocals (1996–1999)
- Gatot "Gatz" Kies — keyboards (1999–2002, Additional:2005-2025 ; died 2025)
- Bambang Ari "Yongky" Nugroho — drums (1997–1998)
- Richard "Icad" Jerome — drums (1998–2001)
- Franky "Ekky" Hediakso — guitar (1996–2002)

== Discography ==
=== Studio albums ===
Title	Album details
Laguku (My Songs)	Released: July 6, 2002; Label: Hemaswara / Musica Studios; Formats: CD, cassette, digital download
Tempat Terindah (Most Beautiful Place)	Released: December 2003; Label: Hemaswara / Musica Studios; Formats: CD, cassette, digital download
Melayang (Floating)	Released: December 7, 2005; Label: Trinity Optima Production, Suria Records; Formats: CD, cassette, digital download
Untukmu Selamanya (Forever For You)	Released: June 15, 2007; Label: Trinity Optima Production, Suria Records; Formats: CD, cassette, digital download
Penguasa Hati (Ruler of the Heart)	Released: May 1, 2009; Label: Trinity Optima Production, Suria Records; Formats: CD, cassette, digital download
1000 Kisah Satu Hati (1000 Stories One Heart)	Released: August 18, 2010; Label: Trinity Optima Production; Formats: CD, digital download
Mozaik (Mosaic)	Released: March 18, 2015; Label: Trinity Optima Production; Formats: CD, digital download
Ungu (Purple)	Released: September 2, 2022; Label: Trinity Optima Production; Formats: CD, digital download

=== Extended plays ===
Title	EP details
SurgaMu (Your Heaven)	Released: September 28, 2006; Label: Trinity Optima Production; Formats: CD, cassette, digital download
Para Pencari Mu (Your Seekers)	Released: September 15, 2007; Label: Trinity Optima Production; Formats: CD, cassette, digital download
Aku dan Tuhanku (Me and My God)	Released: August 14, 2008; Label: Trinity Optima Production; Formats: CD, cassette, digital download

== Awards and nominations ==
Year	Award	Category	Work/Nominee	Result	Ref.
2006	MTV Indonesia Awards	Most Favorite Group/Band/Duo	"Demi Waktu"	Nominated	
2006	MTV Indonesia Awards	Video of the Year	"Demi Waktu"	Nominated	
2007	Music Planet Awards	Best Song	"Demi Waktu"	Nominated	
2007	Music Planet Awards	Most Popular Song	"Demi Waktu"	Nominated	
2007	Music Planet Awards	Best Duo/Group	"Melayang"	Nominated	
2007	Music Planet Awards	Most Popular Group	Ungu	Nominated	
2008	Indonesian Music Awards	Best Pop Album	SurgaMu	Won	
2008	Indonesian Music Awards	Best Pop Duo/Group	"Kekasih Gelapku"	Won	
2009	Indonesian Music Awards	RBT Awards	"Dengan NafasMu"	Won	
2009	Music Planet Awards	Favourite Indonesian Artist	Ungu	Nominated	
2009	Music Planet Awards	Most Popular Regional Artist	Ungu	Nominated	
2010	Indonesian Music Awards	Best Soundtrack	"Cinta Gila"	Won	
2010	Indonesia Kids' Choice Awards	Favorite Band	Ungu	Nominated	
2011	Indonesian Music Awards	Best Pop Duo/Group	"Do'a Untuk Ibu"	Nominated	
2011	Indonesian Music Awards	Best Pop Album	1000 Kisah Satu Hati	Nominated	
2011	Indonesian Music Awards	Best of the Best Album	1000 Kisah Satu Hati	Nominated	
2012	Music Industry Awards	Best Malay Song Performed by a Foreign Artist	—N/a	Nominated	
2012	Indonesia Kids' Choice Awards	Favorite Band	Ungu	Nominated	
2013	Indonesia Kids' Choice Awards	Favorite Band	Ungu	Nominated	
2015	Indonesian Music Awards	Best Speaking Region Production Work	"Baku Jaga"	Nominated	
