= Project Pop =

Indonesian musical group

- Origin: Bandung, West Java, Indonesia
- Genres: Comedic, with influences from various genres
- Years active: 1996–present
- Label: Musica Studios
- Spinoff of: P-Project
- Members: Yosi; Udjo; Gugum; Odie; Tika Panggabean
- Past members: O'on (deceased); Hilman
- Website: project-pop.com

Project Pop is an Indonesian comedic co-ed group from Bandung. Founded in 1996 as a younger generation of P-Project, they distinguished themselves by writing original music. Their first album, Bakpia vs Lumpia was a commercial and critical failure, but beginning with their 2000 album Tu Wa Ga Pat they found mainstream success. Drawing on current musical trends when writing their songs, they have done songs in pop, dangdut, soul, rock, house, and rap. As of 2024, they have released eleven albums.

== History ==
Project Pop was founded in 1996 as a spinoff of P-Project, a previous comedic band. Originally consisting of seven members: Hermann Josis Mokalu (Yosi), Muhammad Fachroni (O'on), Djoni Permato (Udjo), Gumilar Nurochman (Gugum), Wahyu Rudi Astadi (Odie), Hilman Mutasi (Hilman) and Kartika Rachel Setia Redjeki Panggabean (Tika, the only female member). Aside from Gugum, who attended Padjadjaran University, all attended Parahyangan Catholic University.

Project Pop soon distinguished themselves from P-Project by writing their own songs, instead of parodying then-popular songs. Their first album, Bakpia vs Lumpia, was not well received. After one album, Hilman decided to stepped down in 2000, leaving six members in a process. After a hiatus brought on by the 1997 Asian financial crisis, they released their second album, 2000's Tu Wa Ga Pat (short for Satu Dua Tiga Empat or One Two Three Four), which was well received. Hera Diani of The Jakarta Post described it as being full of "contagious pop tunes and comical, yet witty lyrics."

This success was followed by a "repackage[d]" album, Bli Dong Plis (Buy This, Please) in 2001, with "Jangan Piki-Piki" ("Don't Be Picky") becoming a hit. Two years later this was followed by Pop OK, which sold 300,000 copies and was certified double platinum. In 2004 they collaborated with soloist Chrisye on the song "Bur-Kat" for his album Senyawa.

In 2005, Project Pop released Pop Circus; the music video for "Jangan Ganggu Banci" ("Don't Bother Transvestite!") went on to win MTV Indonesia's video clip of the year. Two years later, they released Six-A-Six, with metal and disco influences.

In 2008, Project Pop released their seventh album, Top of the Pop. In 2009, Project Pop released their eighth album, You Got. The title is an acronym of their stage names.

In 2013, Project Pop decided to release their ninth album, Move On under Royal Prima Musikindo label (after 16 years under Musica Studios label). Two years later, Project Pop released their second repackaged album, Move On Lagi (Move On Again) that consisted to 2 new songs and 10 existing songs from the previous album, Move On. This album is only distributed in KFC branches in Indonesia.

In 2016, upon hearing news of O'on's sickness, Project Pop released an exclusive single called "Cepat Sembuh" ("Get Well Soon").

On 13 January 2017, one of Project Pop's members, O'on, died of complications of diabetes at his residence in Bandung. This left Project Pop with five members. In 2024, Project Pop released their eleventh album, Project Pop 2856 that consisted a re-recorded songs from Lumpia vs Bakpia until You Got albums under Musica Studios label.

== Style ==
Project Pop's song are generally about current issues, but presented with "humorous lyrics and playful melodies". Their musical genre changes with what is trending; for example, "Bur-Kat" was rap inspired, while their 2003 song "Dangdut is the Music of My Country" (Pop OK Album) was a mix of then-trending Linkin Park-style rock and dangdut. They have done songs in pop, dangdut, soul, rock, house, and rap.

Originally, the band focused on the comedic aspects of their songs, writing songs about "food and martial arts fighters". However, due to pressures caused by the switch to ringback tones as the main sales media and a concern that their songs were "funny but not lasting", they switched to more overt messages, understandable within a 30-second clip.

== Performances ==
Project Pop often performs live, at traditional music venues as well as birthday parties and campaign and product events.

Each member has their own strengths. In a 2001 interview with The Jakarta Post, Udjo stated that Yosi came up with the concepts, Gugum kept spontaneous, and Tika gauged the audience's mood.

== Discography ==
As of 2024, Project Pop has released eleven albums

- Bakpia vs Lumpia (1996)
- Tu Wa Ga Pat (One Two Three Four; 2000)
- Bli Dong Plis (Please Buy; 2001)
- Pop OK (2003)
- Pop Circus (2005)
- Six-A-Six (A play on Six Asyik, meaning 'Six is Interesting'; 2007)
- Top of the Pop (2008)
- You Got (2009)
- Move On (2013)
- Move On Lagi (Move On Again; 2015)
- Project Pop 2856 (2024)

== Works cited ==
- Dewi, Mariani (1 February 2009). "Project Pop: Behind the happy faces". The Jakarta Post.
- Diani, Hera (5 August 2001). "Project Pop makes music with a laugh". The Jakarta Post.
- "Ilmu Baru Chrisye" [Chrisye's New Art]. Gatra (in Indonesian). 29 October 2004.
- "Project Pop chooses to be different". The Jakarta Post. 14 September 2009.
- "Project Pop" (in Indonesian). Musica Studio's. 5 August 2001.
- Solihun, Soleh (December 2009). "Happy Terus" [Always Happy]. Rolling Stone Indonesia (in Indonesian) (56). Jakarta: A&E Media: 20–21. Archived from the original on 28 March 2012.
