= Olla Ramlan =

Indonesian TV presenter and model

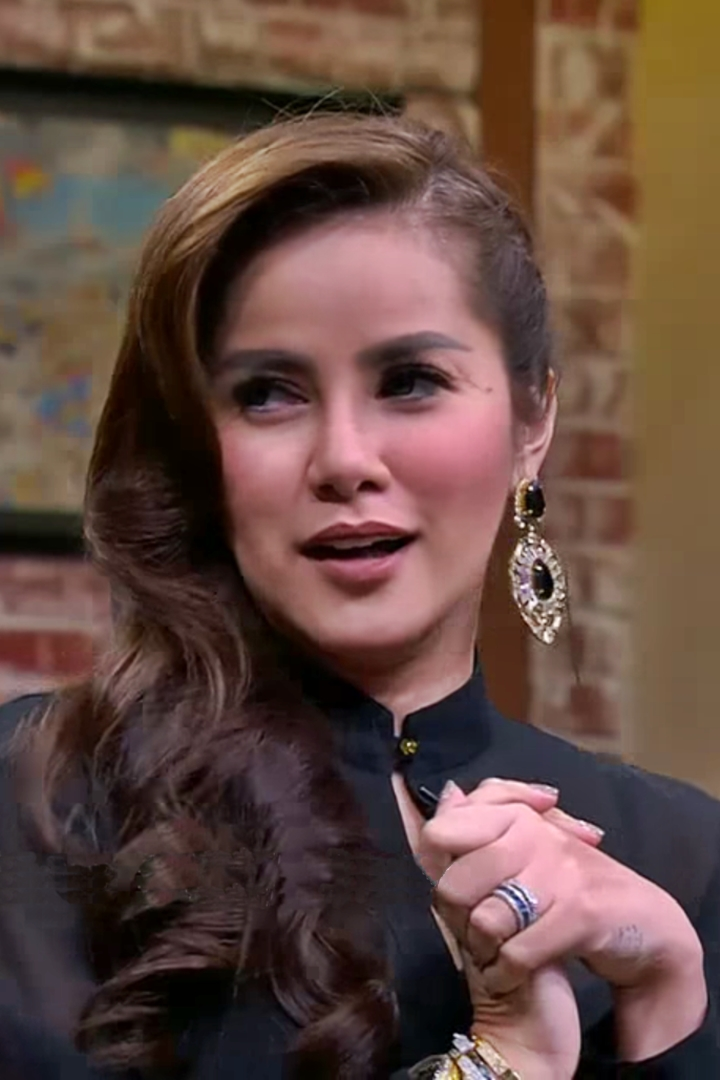
- Ramlan in 2017
- Born: Lidya Febiola Ramlan; 15 February 1980 (age 46); Banjarmasin, South Kalimantan, Indonesia
- Other name: Olla Ramlan Tissa
- Occupations: Celebrity; model; singer; socialite
- Years active: 1997–present
- Partner(s): Alex Tian (2003–2010), Muhammad Aufar Hutapea (2012–2022)
- Children: Sean Michael Alexander
- Parent: Muhammad Ramlan (Father) Tissa Assarah (Mother)

Lidya Febiola Ramlan (born 15 February 1980) is an Indonesian presenter, model, TV personality, and socialite.

== Career ==
Ramlan started her career as an event finalist selection Mode Cover Girl in 2007 after her sister Lolita submitted an entry form for her. She soon received offers to appear in soap operas and ad campaigns.

She appeared in the soap opera Shakila, and in a coffee commercial whose lines are still remembered as Pagi Donna.

In November 2010, she was appointed as brand ambassador for Yahoo! OMG!.

== Family ==
Ramlan is the sixth child of 11 siblings.

Ramlan officially divorced with her husband Alex Tian in October 2010.

== Film ==
- Suami-Suami Takut Istri the Movie (2008)
- Sakral (2018)
- Bunga di Tepi Jurang (2026, series)

== Sinetron/dramas ==
- Shakila
- Perempuan
- Cinta Indah
- OKB
- Mata Air Surga
- Nada Cinta

== Music video appearances ==
- Volume Band – "Hey Cantik"
- Mulan Jameela feat Mitha The Virgin – "Cinta Mati 2"
- Olga Syahputra – "Jangan Ganggu Aku Lagi"
- Ilovu – "Pacar 3"

== Single ==
- "Gotcha" (feat Robin Hood)
- "Sakit Hati"
- "Stop" (feat Dewi Sandra)

== TV host ==
- Dahsyat (RCTI)

== Advertisement ==
- Nescafé
- Yahoo
- Sharp
- Magnum
