= Andien =

Indonesian actress, singer (born 1985)

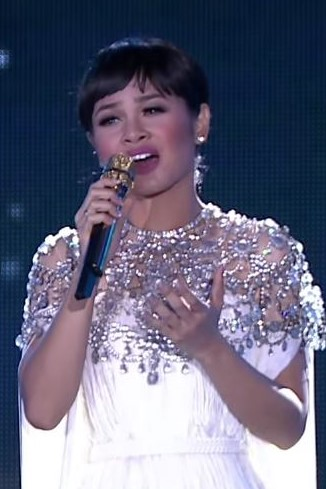

Background information
- Born: Andini Aisyah Hariadi; 25 August 1985 (age 40); Jakarta, Indonesia
- Genres: Pop; jazz
- Occupations: Actress; singer
- Instruments: Vocals
- Years active: 2000–present
- Labels: Warner Music Indonesia (2000—2005); Platinum Records (2010—2013); Music Factory Indonesia (2014); Demajors (2017—present); Andien Music; Paragon Record
- Website: andienaisyah.com

Andini Aisyah Hariadi or better known by her stage name Andien (born August 25, 1985) is an Indonesian actress and singer. She was born in Jakarta, the eldest of the three children of Didiek Hariadi and Henny Sri Hardini. She married Irfan Wahyudi on April 27, 2015.

== Career ==
Andien became the primary cast of the family musical drama City of Love in 2025.

== Discography ==
=== Studio albums ===
- Bisikan Hati (2000)
- Kinanti (2002)
- Gemintang (2005)
- Kirana (2010)
- #Andien (2013)
- Let It Be My Way (2014)
- Metamorfosa (2017)
