= Nidji =

Indonesian rock band

- Also known as: Niji (2002–2005)
- Origin: Jakarta, Indonesia
- Genres: Alternative rock; modern rock; Britpop
- Years active: 2002–present (hiatus: 2018–2019)
- Labels: Upperground; Musica
- Members: Ramadhista Akbar; Andi Ariel Harsya; Andro Regantoro; Adri Prakarsa; Randy Danistha; Yusuf Ubay
- Past members: Giring Ganesha
- Website: nidji.id

Nidji is an Indonesian rock band based in Jakarta. Formed in February 2002, Nidji's name comes from the Japanese word niji (虹), meaning "rainbow". The band's music can be classified under the alternative pop genre, and the band has cited Coldplay and The Killers as major influences. The band currently consists of Ramadhista Akbar and Andi Ariel Harsya (guitars), Andro Regantoro (bass), Adri Prakarsa (drums), Randy Danistha (keyboards/synthesizers), and Yusuf Ubay (vocals/saxophone).

The band has released six singles: "Child", "Sudah", "Hapus Aku", "Kau dan Aku", "Disco Lazy Time" and "Biarlah". Two of the singles, "Heaven" from the Breakthru' album and "Shadows", taken from the Top Up album, were used as background music in the Southeast Asian third season promos for the television series Heroes, and they provided soundtrack music for the Indonesian film Laskar Pelangi.

The album Breakthru was released in 2005 with an English-language version the following year. The second album, Top Up, was released in 2007.

== History ==
Nidji was formed in February 2002 and was originally named Niji. The establishment of Nidji came about through the friendship between Ramadhista and Andro. They were joined by Ariel and together they wrote a song entitled "Maria". However, "Maria" was not completed until Giring met them and added some vocals.

Afterwards, Andro recommended Adri who had often done jam sessions with him to fill the position of drummer. The four of them then invited Rama to join. At the beginning of April 2005, Nidji added another member, Randy, a keyboard player who was a close friend of Giring. Shortly after, the band changed to the current name, Nidji, with a "D" on it.

In 2012, the "Liberty Victory" song was used by Manchester United as a new anthem.

Five years later, on April 5, 2017, the band released a new album entitled Love, Fake & Friendship. It is the last album that featured the original vocalist Giring before he left for his political career. From December 2018 to January 2019, Nidji and Musica Studios opened auditions to find Giring's successor. From around 2,000 participants, 10 chosen candidates had the opportunity to perform with Giring and the band. At Giring's final concert "Mimpi adalah Kunci" on February 2, 2019, Yusuf Ubay, who was also a 2014 Indonesian Idol contestant, was chosen as Nidji's new vocalist.

== Side projects ==
=== NEV ===
In October 2013, Nidji formed a side project called NEV (Nidji Electronic Version), which they used as an avenue to explore their electronic side. In this project, they rearranged their songs to the electronic version. However, the remix version will not be released to be an album. They will play it in live performance only.

=== NEV+ ===
Following the departure of the vocalist Giring and the hiatus of Nidji, the other five members formed a side project called NEV+ (Nidji Electronic Version Plus) in 2017. Its concept is the same with NEV. Without Giring participation, NEV name was changed to NEV+. 'Plus' means the collaboration of Nidji with a number of other singers, to fill in the gaps left by Giring.

In 2018, NEV+ alongside NOAH vocalist Nazril "Ariel" Irham and Hivi! former vocalist Dalila "Dea" Azkadiputri performed "Janger Persahabatan", a song written by Guruh Soekarnoputra. This song was made as one of the official songs for the 2018 Asian Games.

== Band members ==
=== Current members ===
- Ramadhista Akbar (Rama) — guitar, backing vocals (2002–present)
- Andi Ariel Harsya — guitar (2002–present)
- Andro Regantoro — bass guitar, backing vocals (2002–present)
- Adri Prakarsa — drums (2002–present)
- Randy Danistha (Run-D) — keyboards, synthesizers, backing vocals (2005–present)
- Yusuf Ubay — lead vocals, saxophone (2019–present)

=== Former members ===
- Giring Ganesha — lead vocals, guitar, piano (2002–2017)

== Discography ==
Title	Album details
Breakthru	Released: May 18, 2006; Label: Musica Studio's; Formats: CD, LP, digital download
Top Up	Released: November 7, 2007; Label: Musica Studio's; Formats: CD, digital download
Let's Play	Released: October 10, 2009; Label: Musica Studio's; Formats: CD, digital download
Liberty Victory	Double album: Liberty in Indonesian, Victory in English; Released: October 19, 2011 (Liberty); July 16, 2012 (Liberty Victory); Label: Musica Studio's; Formats: CD, digital download
Love, Fake & Friendship	Released: April 5, 2017; Label: Musica Studio's; Formats: CD, digital download
Manifestasi Hati	Released: January 17, 2025; Label: Musica Studio's; Formats: Digital download

== Awards ==
Year	Nominee / work	Award	Result
2006	Nidji	MTV Indonesia Awards — Most Favorite Band	Won
2006	Nidji	MTV Indonesia Awards — Most Favorite New Artist	Won
2014	"Sumpah dan Cintaku Matiku"	Indonesian Music Awards — Best Original Soundtrack Film	Won
