= Wali (band) =

Indonesian musical group

- Origin: Ciputat, South Tangerang, Indonesia
- Genre: Pop melayu
- Years active: 1999-present
- Label: Nagaswara
- Members: Faank; Apoy; Tomi; Ovie
- Past members: Endang Kurnia; Raden; Nunu

Wali is an Indonesian alternative rock band formed in Ciputat, South Tangerang, Indonesia, in 1999. The band comprises vocalist Faank, guitarist Apoy, drummer Tomi, and keyboardist Ovie. The band has been billed as part of the "local creative pop" scene, which incorporates the use of Malay pop rhythms in their songs.

Wali is known for their hit singles, such as "Cari Jodoh", "Dik", "Si Udin Bertanya", and "Baik Baik Sayang". The first album, titled Orang Bilang (People Say) was released in 2008.

== Band members ==
=== Current lineup ===
- Farhan "Faank" Zainal Muttaqin – lead vocals, occasional rhythm guitar (1999-present)
- Aan "Apoy" Kurnia – lead guitar, backing vocals (1999-present)
- Ihsan "Tomi" Bustomi – drums, percussion, occasional backing vocals (1999-present)
- Hamzah "Ovie" Shopi – keyboards, piano, organ, synthesizer, backing vocals (2006-present)

=== Past members ===
- Endang Kurnia – bass (1999-2006)
- Raden – rhythm guitar, backing vocals (1999-2006)
- Nunu – bass, backing vocals (2006-2009)

=== Additional musicians ===
- Eki Sugandi – rhythm guitar, backing vocals (2006-present)
- Endang Kurnia – bass (2009-present)

== Discography ==
Year	Album
2008	Orang Bilang
2009	Cari Jodoh
2010	Ingat Shalawat
2011	Aku Bukan Bang Toyib
2012	3 in 1
2015	Doain Ya Penonton
2020	20.20
