= Marcel Chandrawinata =

German Indonesian actor and model

- Born: March 29, 1987 (age 39); Hanover, Germany
- Education: Pelita Harapan University
- Occupations: Actor, model
- Years active: 2005 - present
- Height: 187 cm (6 ft 2 in)
- Spouse: Pricilla Deasy Tirtadjaja
- Parent(s): Andy Chandrawinata (father); Elfriede Chandrawinata (mother)
- Family: Nadine Chandrawinata (sister); Mischa Chandrawinata (brother)

Marcel Chandrawinata (born March 29, 1987) is an Indonesian actor and model best known for his role in the film Alexandria, co-starring with Julie Estelle.

== Early life ==
Marcel Chandrawinata was born in Hannover, Germany. His father is Chinese-Indonesian and Javanese and his mother is German. He has two siblings: identical twin brother Mischa, who is also an actor, and elder sister Nadine, an actress and beauty queen. His family later moved to Indonesia.

Chandrawinata is a Catholic. He attended Ora et Labora Elementary School and Tirta Martha BPK Penabur Protestant High School. After graduating from high school, he continued his studies at Pelita Harapan University, majoring in industrial engineering.

== Career ==
Chandrawinata started his career as a teen model before turning his attention to acting. He had appeared in several Indonesian movies including Catatan Akhir Sekolah (2005), Alexandria (2006), Summer Breeze (2008), Air Terjun Pengantin (2009), and Pupus (2011).

He also starred in the soap operas Cowok Impian, Selamat Jalan Natasya, Mawar, Alisa, Air Mata Cinta, and Rama dan Ramona.
