= Raffi Ahmad =

Indonesian actor, television presenter, singer and entrepreneur (born 1987)

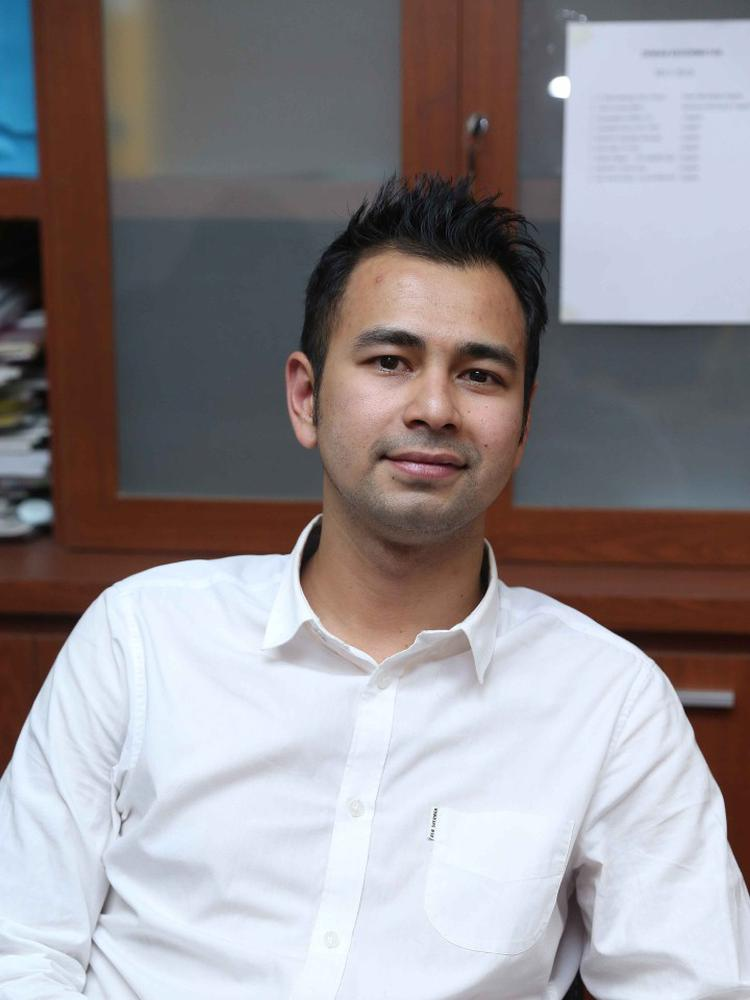
- Ahmad in 2020

Special Envoy of the President of Indonesia for Development of Young Generation and Artists
- Incumbent
- Assumed office 22 October 2024
- President: Prabowo Subianto

Personal details
- Born: Raffi Farid Ahmad; 17 February 1987 (age 39) Bandung, West Java, Indonesia
- Spouse: Nagita Slavina (m. 2014)
- Children: 3
- Parents: Munawar Ahmad (father); Amy Qanita (mother)
- Relatives: Syahnaz Sadiqah (sister); Nisya Ahmad (sister); Alshad Ahmad (cousin)
- Occupation: Actor; television presenter; singer; producer; entrepreneur

Raffi Farid Ahmad (born 17 February 1987) is an Indonesian buzzer, actor, television presenter, singer, producer and entrepreneur. He began his entertainment career as a teenager and later became known for presenting television programmes including Dahsyat and Pesbukers. He has also released music and appeared in films and television dramas.

In 2015, Ahmad and his wife, actress and entrepreneur Nagita Slavina, co-founded the media and entertainment company RANS Entertainment. On 22 October 2024, President Prabowo Subianto appointed him Special Envoy of the President of Indonesia for Development of Young Generation and Artists for the 2024–2029 period.

== Early life ==
Ahmad was born on 17 February 1987 in Bandung, West Java, Indonesia, to Munawar Ahmad and Amy Qanita. His father was of Pakistani descent, while his mother is Sundanese. Ahmad is the eldest of four children. His sisters, Syahnaz Sadiqah and Nisya Ahmad, also work in entertainment.

== Career ==
=== 2001–2011: Early roles and television presenting ===
Ahmad began working in entertainment in 2001, initially appearing as a model and actor. His early acting credits included the soap opera Tunjuk Satu Bintang (2002) and the youth drama Senandung Masa Puber (2003–2004). He subsequently appeared in television films, soap operas and feature films, including Love is Cinta.

In 2006, Ahmad joined the vocal group Bukan Bintang Biasa (BBB), a project formed by songwriter and singer Melly Goeslaw. The group also included Laudya Cynthia Bella, Chelsea Olivia, Dimas Beck and Ayushita. Its releases included "Let's Dance Together", "Bukan Bintang Biasa", "Jangan Bilang Tidak" and "Tergila-Gila".

Ahmad appeared in the films Liar and Asoy Geboy in 2008. That year, he began presenting the music programme Dahsyat, alongside presenters including Luna Maya and Olga Syahputra. The programme became one of his best-known television credits. He continued working as a presenter and actor, appearing in programmes such as Rafi Wkwkwk and OMG, the soap opera Buku Harian Baim and the sitcom OKB.

In 2009, Ahmad released the single "Johan (Jodoh di Tangan Tuhan)" with Laudya Cynthia Bella. In 2010, he recorded "50 Tahun Lagi" with singer Yuni Shara; the two later worked together on other projects, including the film Rumah Tanpa Jendela. Ahmad also directed the short film Barbie, starring Shara. The film was reported to have won the Best Movie award at the 2011 LA Lights Indie Movie competition.

Ahmad continued to appear in film and television, including the 2011 horror-comedy film Pocong Kesetanan.

=== 2012–present: Presenting, business and public office ===
Ahmad continued to work in television and film during the 2010s. His film appearances included Olga & Billy Lost in Singapore (2014) and Rafathar (2017), while his presenting and variety-show credits included Pesbukers, Take Me Out Indonesia, I Can See Your Voice Indonesia, Kontes Dangdut Indonesia and Ini Talkshow. He also continued releasing music, including the album Kamulah Takdirku (2015).

In 2015, Ahmad and Slavina founded RANS Entertainment. The company began as a digital media and content operation and expanded into entertainment production, events and other business activities. In 2021, Ahmad and businessman Rudy Salim acquired the football club Cilegon United FC, which was renamed RANS Cilegon FC and later became RANS Nusantara F.C.. Ahmad was also among the founders of RANS Basketball, now known as RANS Simba Bogor. RANS was also listed as a sponsor of the Moto2 team Pertamina Mandalika SAG Team in 2021; this was a sponsorship association rather than team ownership.

On 22 October 2024, Ahmad was sworn in by President Prabowo Subianto as Special Envoy of the President of Indonesia for Development of Young Generation and Artists. His appointment was made under Presidential Decree No. 76/M of 2024 for the 2024–2029 period.

== Personal life ==
Ahmad married actress and entrepreneur Nagita Slavina on 17 October 2014. Their first son, Rafathar Malik Ahmad, was born on 15 August 2015, and their second son, Rayyanza Malik Ahmad, was born on 26 November 2021. In 2024, the couple took in a baby girl known publicly as Lily; they later said that they had adopted her.

== Controversies ==
=== 2013 narcotics investigation ===
On 27 January 2013, the National Narcotics Agency (BNN) raided Ahmad's home in South Jakarta and detained him and other people as part of an investigation into suspected drug use. Authorities reported finding marijuana and a substance then identified in reports as methylone. BNN subsequently said that Ahmad had tested positive for methylone and announced that he would undergo medical rehabilitation.

=== Honorary degree controversy ===
In 2024, Ahmad received an honorary doctorate in "Event Management and Global Digital Development" from the Universal Institute of Professional Management (UIPM), which said the award recognized his work in entertainment and digital development. The award prompted questions about the institution's status and its authority to provide higher education in Indonesia.

Indonesia's Directorate General of Higher Education said UIPM did not have an operating permit to provide higher education in Indonesia and that degrees issued by institutions without the required authorization could not be recognized by the Indonesian government. UIPM representatives disputed the criticism, arguing that the institution operated internationally and delivered its programmes online.

== Discography ==
=== Studio albums ===
- Kamulah Takdirku (2015)
- Rafathar (2017; soundtrack album)

=== Singles ===
Year	Title	Album	Label
2006	"Let's Dance Together" (with BBB and Melly Goeslaw)	Mindnsoul	Aquarius Musikindo
2007	"Bukan Bintang Biasa" (with BBB)	Ost. Bukan Bintang Biasa	Aquarius Musikindo
2007	"Jangan Bilang Tidak" (feat. Ayushita)	Ost. Bukan Bintang Biasa	Aquarius Musikindo
2007	"Tergila-Gila"	Ost. Bukan Bintang Biasa	Aquarius Musikindo
2008	"Putus Nyambung" (with BBB)	Non-album single	Aquarius Musikindo
2009	"Jodoh di Tangan Tuhan" (feat. Laudya Cynthia Bella)	Non-album single	
2010	"50 Tahun Lagi" (feat. Yuni Shara)	Non-album single	
2011	"Cinta Ini" (feat. Yuni Shara)	Non-album single	
2011	"1,2,3" (feat. Yuni Shara and Cavin Cello)	Non-album single	
2012	"CH2 (Cinta Hati Hati)" (with BBB and Melly Goeslaw)	Balance	Aquarius Musikindo
2013	"Air dan Api"	Kamulah Takdirku	MyMusic Records
2014	"Bukan Rama Shinta"	Kamulah Takdirku	MyMusic Records
2014	"Kamulah Takdirku" (feat. Nagita Slavina)	Kamulah Takdirku	MyMusic Records
2015	"Masih" (feat. Nagita Slavina)	Kamulah Takdirku	MyMusic Records
2015	"Terbaik Untukmu"	Kamulah Takdirku	MyMusic Records
2015	"Let's Talk About Love" (feat. Nagita Slavina)	Kamulah Takdirku	MyMusic Records
2015	"Jika" (feat. Nagita Slavina)	Kamulah Takdirku	MyMusic Records
2015	"Menikahmu" (feat. Nagita Slavina)	Kamulah Takdirku	MyMusic Records
2015	"Lepaskan Saja"	Kamulah Takdirku	MyMusic Records
2015	"Pesawat Terbang"	Kamulah Takdirku	MyMusic Records
2016	"Penerus Darahku"	OST Rafathar (Original Soundtrack)	MyMusic Records
2017	"Heey Yoo Rafathar" (feat. Nagita Slavina)	OST Rafathar (Original Soundtrack)	MyMusic Records
2017	"Mati Bersamamu" (feat. Nagita Slavina)	OST Rafathar (Original Soundtrack)	MyMusic Records
2017	"Takdir Manusia" (feat. Nagita Slavina)	OST Rafathar (Original Soundtrack)	MyMusic Records
2017	"Buka Puasa" (feat. Nagita Slavina)	Non-album single	Unknown

=== Music video appearances ===
Year	Title	Artist
2004	"Aku Masih Cinta"	Delon featuring Andre Hehanusa
2004	"Salam Bagi Sahabat"	Albert Fakdawer featuring Glenn Fredly
2005	"Manusia Biasa"	Radja
2005	"Pasangan Yang Tepat"	Marshanda
2009	"Hancur Hatiku"	Olga Syahputra
2009	"Seribu Tahun Lamanya"	Sophie Navita
2011	"Aku Cinta"	Yuni Shara
2011	"Everybody Knew"	Citra Scholastika
2011	"Kemana Saja Dirimu"	Nova Rianty
2013	"Goyang Bang Jali"	Denny Wahyudi
2017	"Sejuta Buah"	Sarwendah Tan
2021	"23"	Marsha Zulkarnain

== Filmography ==
=== Films ===
Year	Title	Role	Notes
2004	Ada Hantu di Sekolah	Arya	Lead role
2005	Me vs High Heels	Dondon	Supporting role
2005	Panggil Namaku Tiga Kali	Brian	Supporting role
2006	Cinta Pertama	Cameo	
2007	Bukan Bintang Biasa	Raffi	Lead role
2007	Love is Cinta	Doni	Lead role; nominated for Most Favorite Actor at the 2007 MTV Indonesia Movie Awards
2008	40 Hari Bangkitnya Pocong	Nino	Lead role
2008	Liar	Bayu	Lead role
2008	Asoy Geboy	Didi	Lead role
2009	Putih Abu-Abu dan Sepatu Kets	Raffi	Cameo
2010	Barbie	—	Director; short film
2011	Rumah Tanpa Jendela	Raga	Supporting role
2011	Virgin 3	Burger seller	Cameo
2011	Get Married 3	Sophie's boyfriend	Cameo
2011	Pocong Kesetanan	Asep	Lead role
2014	Olga & Billy Lost in Singapore	Raffi	Special appearance
2017	Rafathar	Johnny Gold	Lead role
2018	The Secret: Suster Ngesot Urban Legend	Teddy	Lead role
2018	Kesempatan Kedua	Abi	Lead role
2018	Arwah Tumbal Nyai, Part Nyai	Reno	
2019	Rumput Tetangga	Ben	

=== Soap operas ===
Year	Title	Role	Notes	Network
2002	Tunjuk Satu Bintang			SCTV
2003–2004	Senandung Masa Puber	Dias		Trans TV
2004	Ada Cinta di Lantai 9			Trans TV
2004–2005	Aku Ingin Hidup			SCTV
2005	Me vs High Heels the Series	Dondon		ANTV
TBA	Asyiknya Pacaran			TV7
TBA	Bisikan Dari Atas			SCTV
2006	Juragan Jengkol			SCTV
2006	Olivia	Justin	Lead role	RCTI
2007	Romantika Remaja	Kelvin	Lead role	SCTV
2007	Andai Ku Tahu	Marcel		RCTI
2007	Doo Bee Doo	Ariel		RCTI
2008	Janji Cinta	Aditya	Lead role	RCTI
2008	Dimas dan Raka	Raka	Lead role	Global TV
2009	Tarzan Cilik	Raffi		RCTI
2009	Baim Anak Sholeh	Raffi		RCTI
2009	Buku Harian Baim	Ariel		SCTV
2010	Koboi Cabe Rawit	Ariel		SCTV
2010	Mendadak Alim			Global TV
2010	Titip Rindu	Bagas	Lead role	SCTV
2011	Bintang Untuk Baim	Reno		SCTV
2011	Baim Jaim	Jaim	Lead role	MNCTV
2011	Arti Sahabat Season 2	Revan	Lead role	Indosiar
2011–2012	Dia atau Diriku	Satria/Axel		SCTV
2013	Putri Nomor 1	Arya	Lead role	RCTI
2017	I-KTP	Entut	Lead role	ANTV

=== Television series ===
Year	Title	Network
2005	Extravaganza ABG	Trans TV
2008	OKB	Trans7
2008–2018, 2020–2021	Dahsyat	RCTI
2011–present	Pesbukers	ANTV
2012	Waktunya Kita Sahur	Trans TV
2013	Yuk Kita Sahur	Trans TV
2013–2014	Yuk Keep Smile	Trans TV
2014	Sahurnya Ramadhan	Trans TV
2014	Slide Show	Trans TV
2014	Sentil	Trans TV
2014	Ngabuburit	Trans TV
2014	The Blusukan	Trans TV
2014–2020	Janji Suci Raffi & Gigi	Trans TV
2015	RANS Family	NET.
2016–2018	Rumah Mama Amy	MNCTV
2017–2018	Republik Sosmed	Trans TV
2020–2021	The Sultan	SCTV
2021–2022	The Sultan Entertainment	SCTV
2022–present	FYP	Trans7
2022–present	Ketawa Itu Berkah	Trans TV
2022–present	Inbox	SCTV
2023–present	House of Mama Gigi	SCTV
2023–present	The Sultan Empire	SCTV
