= I Can See Your Voice Indonesia season 3 =

Television game show season

I Can See Your Voice Indonesia
- Season 3
- Starring: Wendy Armoko; Vega Darwanti; Lee Jeong-hoon; Anwar Sanjaya; Ayu Ting Ting
- Hosted by: Raffi Ahmad; Indra Herlambang
- Winners: Good singers: 12; Bad singers: 8
- No. of episodes: 18

Release
- Original network: MNCTV
- Original release: 11 March – 16 July 2018

Season chronology
- ← Previous; Season 2 Next → Season 4

The third season of the Indonesian television mystery music game show I Can See Your Voice Indonesia premiered on MNCTV on 11 March 2018.

This season also featured the first two games playing under "battle format" in an existing counterpart of I Can See Your Voice, since its introduction in Giọng ải giọng ai.

== Gameplay ==
=== Formats ===
According to the original South Korean rules, the guest artist(s) must attempt to eliminate bad singers during its game phase. At the final performance, the last remaining mystery singer is revealed as either good or bad by means of a duet between them and one of the guest artists.

For games played under the "battle format" (from Giọng ải giọng ai), two opposing guest artists eliminate one singer each during the proper game phase, and then keep one singer each to join the final performance. The winner is determined by the remaining mystery singers, who are chosen by opposing guest artists, as per specific winning condition depends on the outcome of their final performance, if:

1. One opposing guest artist kept a good singer and the other had a bad singer, or
2. Both opposing guest artists kept good or bad singers.

If the last remaining mystery singer is good, they are featured in a post-show privilege video; if a singer is bad, they win Rp 17,500,000.

=== Rounds ===
1. Visual round
  The guest artist is given some time to observe and examine each mystery singer based on their appearance.
2. Lip sync round
  Each mystery singer performs a lip sync to a song; good singers mime to a recording of their own, while bad singers mime to a backing track by another vocalist.
3. 1. Rehearsal round (eps. 1–6)
  Three random panelists are wearing headphones to listen to a recording of assigned mystery singer that lasts for 30 seconds. Afterward, the panelist defends the mystery singer and convince the guest artist to choose them for a final performance.
3. 2. Evidence round (eps. 7–18)
  A proof of each mystery singer's singing ability (i.e. photo, video, certificates, etc.) is shown on the screen. Good singers have own evidences, while bad singers had their evidences fabricated.

== Episodes ==
=== Guest artists ===
Legend:
Good singer
Bad singer

Episode		Guest artist (Note: Players' notes: For the returning guest artists (who also include foreigners and former good singers), names are displayed in italics.; For the mixed groups, names who identified as bad singers are displayed in italics.)	Mystery singers (In their respective numbers and aliases)						
#	Date	Guest artist	Elimination order						Winner
#	Date	Guest artist	Visual round		Lip sync round		Evidence round		Winner
1	11 March 2018	Ashanty and Anang Hermansyah	2. Boy; (Photography Idol)	1. Sindhy; (Top Model)	5. Danar; (Popular Lawyer)	3. Melania; (Contemporary Host)	4. Muhammad Rizky; (B-boy)	6. Ade; (Famous Guitarist)	7. Fitri Apriliani; Flower Girl
2	24 March 2018	Zian Spectre	5. Ase; (Festival Singer)	3. Yemima; (Stage Star)	2. Stevan; (Romantic Singer)	7. Hilda; (Karaoke Star)	1. Cempaka; (Social Media Idol)	4. Meili; (Nowadays' Diva)	6. Kayla Dias; Rhythm Conqueror
3	31 March 2018	Erie Suzan	7. Bangsawan; (Prince Charming)	5. Icha; (Jasmine)	4. Krishna Mukti; (Peter Pan)	3. Nita; (Cinderella)	1. Emma Kumbara; (Red Riding Hood)	2. Susi; (Snow White)	6. Maretta; Pocahontas
4	7 April 2018	Ihsan Tarore	5. Joseph; (Metallic Child)	2. Tiara; (Famous Soloist)	1. Della; (Opera Star)	6. Berlianda Gucci; (Whiz Rapper)	4. Viana; (Temon-holic)	3. Raffi; (Reggae Mania)	7. Gita Aulia Primaswati; Music Blogger
5	14 April 2018	Jenita Janet	2. Devi; (Bollywood Diva)	1. Tommy Hendrawan; (Musical Gladiator)	5. Aldila; (Palace Singer)	6. Yovel Purba; (Ethnic Singer)	4. Sari; (Voice Warrior)	3. Alfred; (Note Emperor)	7. Audya; Rhythmic Potion
6	21 April 2018	Regina Ivanova	1. Sevi; (Taekwondo Master)	6. Sultan; (Snake Charmer)	4. Fredo; (Motorcycle Knight)	3. Lia; (Fire Girl)	5. Adel; (The Majorette)	2. Dimas Titis; (Sweetheart Clown)	7. Windhy Hariyadi; Beautiful Mechanic
7	28 April 2018	Hanin Dhiya	2. Dilla; (Queen of Ice)	4. Tiara Amora; (Protector of the Earth)	7. Mega Pistia Lumondo and Gabriella Lumondo; (Angels of Fire)	3. Lucas; (Prince of Metal)	5. Ziva Magnolya; (Princess of Light)	1. Milano Tanod; (Knight of Wind)	6. Amel; Goddess of Water
8	5 May 2018	Rita Sugiarto	4. Melly Meyra; (Shining Idol)	7. Afhar; (Captain of the Sun)	3. Dinda Cenil; (Rainbow Queen)	5. Ari Wibowo; (Commander of the Snow)	1. Reisha Amelia; (Drought Princess)	6. Asep Rudy Heriawan; (Lord of the Rain)	2. Margia; Goddess of the Moon
9	19 May 2018	RizkiRidho (Rizki Syafaruddin and Ridho Syafaruddin)	1. Helmy Farizal; (Astronaut)	7. Maryam; (Betawi Bride)	5. Doa Ayumi; (The Dancer)	3. Rakesh Paul; (Homesick Doctor)	4. Halusiana; (Dracula Queen)	6. Greymel Rellif; (Football Captain)	2. Ria Pamungkas; Beautiful Queen
10	26 May 2018	Kristina Iswandari	3. Abdi Kurnia; (Pipe Controller)	1. Salma Rizqiana; (Bunny)	5. Aksay Mahardhika; (Handsome Bride)	2. Maudy Pitaloka; (Fan Dancer)	6. Nia Hamidah; (Lady Drummer)	4. Reinca Millen; (Master of Darkness)	7. Qisty Armalia Hirzy; Fruity Queen
11	3 June 2018	Denada	3. Geffry Ishak; (Dream Hero)	2. Priscilia Kurniaji; (World Adventurer)	6. Lala Kayang; (Banana Lover)	4. Haya; (Cute Doll)	7. Louis Angraini; (Bear Friend)	1. Tami Aulia; (Cute Monster)	5. Francis Surbakti; Caveman
12	10 June 2018	Titi DJ	3. Nadira Arisanty; (Princess Sofia)	1. Salsabilla Septia; (Alice)	6. David Amadeus Geraldian; (Iron Man)	7. Farida Al-Aidrus; (Lady Cowboy)	4. Faisal Kevin Lengkong; (Captain America)	2. Bobby Rubian; (Hulk)	5. Putu Devi Casthio Sutanegara; Hermione
13	17 June 2018	Iis Dahlia	3. Ayu; (The Pilot)		2. Balqis; (Famous Engineer)	5. Made Agastya Ardana; (Meat Lover)	4. Anindita Tania; (Heart Tender)	1. Masya; (Pretty Magician)	6. Wahyu Suhada Vega; True-born Artist
13	17 June 2018	Devano Danendra	3. Ayu; (The Pilot)		2. Balqis; (Famous Engineer)	5. Made Agastya Ardana; (Meat Lover)	4. Anindita Tania; (Heart Tender)	1. Masya; (Pretty Magician)	7. Febrian; Exemplary Judge
14	24 June 2018	Maria Simorangkir	1. Anindita Maharani; (Ms. Expression)	2. Priscilla Marbun; (Ms. Divine)	3. Ayu; (Ms. Lovely)	5. Kaleb Sihombing; (Mr. Fantastic)	6. Indira Rosdianti; (Ms. Energetic)	4. Randy Herdian; (Mr. Cool)	7. Richard Dito; Mr. Geeky
15	1 July 2018	Ahmad Abdul	2. Ferdy Umbara; (Dive Man)	5. Armando Tadjuddin; (Rhythmic Detective)	1. Monica Nike Abida; (Dimsum Lady)	3. Jessica Siahaan; (Java Singer)	7. Achmad Ismail Madu; (Passionate Voice)	4. Theresia Puspa; (The New Kid)	6. Dewi Kartika; Party Queen
16	8 July 2018	Andhika Pratama and Ussy Sulistiawaty	4. Satrio Lakhsarti Arfianto; (Exciting Orange)	1. Muhammad Ikhsan Nugroho; (Lovely Pink)	3. Mellita; (Special Purple)	6. Ira Permana; (Beautiful Blue)	7. Puri; (Stunning Green)	5. Fani Maulana; (Cheerful Yellow)	2. Della Maulidya; Blushy Red
17	15 July 2018	Bertha Herawati	7. Rimar Callista; (Susan)	4. Tari; (Barbie)	1. Nicky; (Annabelle)	6. Rizky Nataliyani; (Chucky)	2. Damai Tumanggor; (Jigsaw)	3. Ilham Gemilang; (Woody)	5. Agung Ocha; Pippi Stocking
18	16 July 2018	GAC	2. Shafan Anissa; (White Garlic)		1. Geiya Alexandra; (Roro Jonggrang)	7. Hagai Dery Areska; (Wiro Sableng)	3. Ametta; (Golden Cucumber)	6. Tengku Bandar; (Ghost Cave Warrior)	5. Manuella Pasaribu; Red Onion
18	16 July 2018	The Overtunes	2. Shafan Anissa; (White Garlic)		1. Geiya Alexandra; (Roro Jonggrang)	7. Hagai Dery Areska; (Wiro Sableng)	3. Ametta; (Golden Cucumber)	6. Tengku Bandar; (Ghost Cave Warrior)	4. Ezief; Master Kundang

=== Panelists ===
Legend:
Regular panelist
Additional panelist
Guest panelist

Apps		Panelists in attendance (Sorted by first appearance, with episode designations)
g#	p#	Panelists in attendance (Sorted by first appearance, with episode designations)
18	1	Ayu Ting Ting (1–18)
17	1	Lee Jeong-hoon (Note: Panelists' note: Foreign attendees: Tyson Lynch (AUS), Fakhrul Razi (BRU), Yuka Tamada (JPN), and Lee Jeong-hoon (ROK)) (1–9; 11–18)
15	1	Wendy Armoko (1–12, 16–18)
14	1	Vega Darwanti (1–6, 8–12, 16–18)
12	1	Anwar Sanjaya (1–2, 5–6, 8, 12–18)
4	1	Deswita Maharani (9–12)
3	1	Melaney Ricardo (7, 14, 16)
2	3	Upiak Isil (3, 13); Kamasean Matthews (6, 18); Evi Masamba (9, 15)
1	30	Ikang Fawzi and Bianca Liza (1); Chand Kelvin and Prilly Latuconsina (2); Jenita Janet and Rafael Tilman (3); Juwita Bahar, Bastian Simbolon, and Yuka Tamada (4); Prastiwi Dwiarti and Wika Salim (5); Rangga (Smash) (6); Denada (7); Fakhrul Razi (8); Agung Hercules, Juan Rahman, and Tina Toon (10); Nowela Auparay (11); Hetty Koes Indang (12); Ria Ricis and Denny Wahyudi (13); Ghea Indrawari, Marion Jola, and Narji (14); Brisia Jodie and RizkiRidho (Rizki and Ridho Syafaruddin) (15); Tyson Lynch (16); Joel Kriwil and Dudy Oris (17); Gloria Jessica (18)
