= I Can See Your Voice Indonesia season 1 =

Television game show season

I Can See Your Voice Indonesia
- Season 1
- Starring: Wendy Armoko; Vega Darwanti; Lee Jeong-hoon; Julia Perez; Ayu Ting Ting; Zaskia Gotik
- Hosted by: Raffi Ahmad; Indra Herlambang
- Winners: Good singers: 9; Bad singers: 4
- No. of episodes: 13

Release
- Original network: MNCTV
- Original release: 29 August – 21 November 2016

Season chronology
- Next → Season 2

The first season of the Indonesian television mystery music game show I Can See Your Voice Indonesia premiered on MNCTV on 29 August 2016.

== Gameplay ==
=== Format ===
According to the original South Korean rules, the guest artist(s) must attempt to eliminate bad singers during its game phase. At the final performance, the last remaining mystery singer is revealed as either good or bad by means of a duet between them and one of the guest artists. (Note: Gameplay note: The number of mystery singers are set to seven (for the rest of episodes) or eight (ep. 13).)

If the last remaining mystery singer is good, they are featured in a post-show privilege video; if a singer is bad, they win Rp 17,500,000.

=== Rounds ===
1. Visual round
  The guest artist is given some time to observe and examine each mystery singer based on their appearance. Afterward, a muted video of each mystery singer that reveals only 0.3 seconds of their singing voice is played as an additional hint.
2. Lip sync round
  Each mystery singer performs a lip sync to a song; good singers mime to a recording of their own, while bad singers mime to a backing track by another vocalist.
3. Evidence round
  A proof of each mystery singer's singing ability (i.e. photo, video, certificates, etc.) is shown on the screen. Good singers have own evidences, while bad singers had their evidences fabricated.

== Episodes ==
=== Guest artists ===
Legend:
Good singer
Bad singer

Episode		Guest artist (Note: Players' notes: For the returning guest artists (who also include foreigners and former good singers), names are displayed in italics.; For the mixed groups, names who identified as bad singers are displayed in italics.)	Mystery singers (In their respective numbers and aliases)							
#	Date	Guest artist	Elimination order							Winner
#	Date	Guest artist	Visual round		Lip sync round			Evidence round		Winner
1	29 August 2016	Be3	6. Fauzan Rahmet Budiman; (Masked Tuxedo)	4. Intan Tito Anggraeni; (Dangerous Woman)	2. Puput Azzy; (Active Girl)		7. Evania Surya Hutasoit; (Florist Girl)	5. Saldina Simarmata; (Kitchen Star)	1. Nikodemus Lukas Hariono; (Stage Warrior)	3. Pino; Good Den
2	5 September 2016	Vina Panduwinata	4. Anton Sudibyo; (Prince Charming)	5. Olivia Monica Siagian; (Genius Singer)	3. Anindita Amalia; (JKT48 Wannabe)		7. Neva Ayu Larissa; (Beauty and the Beat)	6. Jerry; (Jukebox Man)	1. Gerald Juliando; (The Real Divo)	2. Asya Sananta; Raisa's Super Quality
3	12 September 2016	Delon Thamrin	2. Bams; (Soul Singer)	7. Alfian Adhi Putra; (Gentle Voice)	4. Meifliani Budi Utomo; (Queen of Music)		1. Rissa Monica Rais; (Lady of Pop)	6. Monica; (Pitch Perfect)	5. Hadi Rachmadan; (Beat Boy)	3. Andre Ramadhan; Clean Voice
4	19 September 2016	Katon Bagaskara	4. Rida Januarti; (Syahrini's Sweetheart)	6. Alif Sangadji; (Iqbal CJR's Twin)	1. Arnold Yesontha; (The Next Maruli)		5. Nova Herlian; (Aura Kasih's Quality)	3. Michael Glenn; (Glenn Junior)	2. Rischa Hardyan Sukaton; (Jessie J of Surabaya)	7. Refi Adilla; Isyana's Successor
5	26 September 2016	Rizky Febian	4. Farisky Pratama; (Mr. Simple)	5. Falah; (Flirty Girl)	2. Nurul Tri Cahyani; (Wonder Woman)		6. Adriansyah Alfarizi; (Ideal Man)	7. Kirana; (Girl on Fire)	1. Christian Davin Lewis; (Lovely Prince)	3. Claresta Ravenka; Dancing Queen
6	3 October 2016	Virzha	5. Feby; (Barbie Doll)	3. Arnik Mega Nurmalita Sari; (Uptown Girl)	1. Tami Noviaridha; (Poet of Love)		6. Novi Raprap; (Comic Girl)	2. Muhammad Aldrian Risyad; (Guitar Knight)	7. Lifa; (Dark Angel)	4. Tumpal; Super Daddy
7	10 October 2016	Charly van Houten	2. Dea Muhit; (Falsetto Angel)	3. Rara Almeera; (Colourful Rhythm)	1. Rachel Anastasia; (Ballad Master)		7. Jeffrey Singa; (The Great Tenor)	5. Dessy Astuti; (Extra Melody)	6. Ridwan Taopik Akbar; (Famous Bass)	4. Wei Fen; Soprano Diva
8	17 October 2016	Armand Maulana	2. Intan Wulandari Putri; (Cat Lover)	5. Ingrid Tamara Surwano; (Dancing Queen)	3. Jojo; (Gym Trainer)		6. Moria Oktalisa Simanjorang; (Money Maker)	1. Magdalena Adina; (Food Blogger)	7. Angga Indramana; (Raffi's Twin)	4. Aisyah Aulia Ariefanty; Traveller Girl
9	24 October 2016	Ikang Fawzi	5. Galuh Indrajita; (Bandung's Soloist)	6. Putri; (Lady Gaga's Sister)	7. Aldo Adela; (Siwon's Brother)		2. Sealy Rica; (Adele's Replica)	3. Ricky Indrawan Rantung; (Afgan's Wannabe)	4. Acha Ivana Pasaribu; (Fabulous Singer)	1. Clara Iryani; Voice Doctor
10	31 October 2016	Cita Citata	5. Laras; (North Coast Queen)	6. Yayu Fauzy Gunawan; (Rocking Princess)	3. Karina; (Sinden's Scene)		4. Rinda Razhani; (Night Goddess)	2. Ayuni Niwang Nastiti; (Primadonna)	7. Lionel Vino; (Dangdut Prince)	1. Erwin; Love Letter Man
11	7 November 2016	Fatin Shidqia	3. Marco; (Romance String)	2. Haidar; (Nostalgia Wave)	1. Rafi; (Vocal Maestro)		6. Nurul Setia; (Sound of Hope)	7. Moudy; (Symphony Clink)	5. Christina Cindy Larasati; (Harmony Paradise)	4. Ahmad Al-Gufron; Sweet Keys
12	14 November 2016	Cakra Khan	4. Daniel; (Jumping Smash)	2. Desi; (Pompom Girl)	7. Shinta; (Hole in One)		1. Hunter Situmorang; (Slam Dunk)	3. Eva; (Kendo Girl)	5. Rizma Aprilia; (Home Run)	6. Redo; Kick-off
13	21 November 2016	Melly Goeslaw	2. Tiffany; (Opera Idol)	3. Erika; (Music Star)	7. Vidan; (Groovy Boy)	1. Anggis; (Jazz Princess)	5. Elian; (Rhythm Master)	6. Debora; (Healing Voice)	8. Ece; (Humming Crave)	4. Louis; Note Conqueror

=== Panelists ===
Legend:
Regular panelist
Additional panelist
Guest panelist

Apps		Panelists in attendance (Sorted by first appearance, with episode designations)
g#	p#	Panelists in attendance (Sorted by first appearance, with episode designations)
13	2	Wendy Armoko and Ayu Ting Ting (1–13)
8	3	Zaskia Gotik (1–2, 4–8, 10); Lee Jeong-hoon (Note: Panelists' note: Foreign attendee: Lee Jeong-hoon (ROK)) (1–3, 5–8, 13); Vega Darwanti (3, 6, 8–13)
7	1	Julia Perez (1–5, 9, 11)
5	1	Ari Tulang (1–2, 7, 9–10)
3	1	Gisella Anastasia (5, 7, 11)
2	4	Kartika Putri (3, 12); Denada (6, 12); Winda Viska (7, 9); Olla Ramlan (10–11)
1	14	Denny Wahyudi (1); Bisma (Smash) (2); Rafael (Smash) (3); Rangga (Smash) (4); Bastian Simbolon (5); Joel Kriwil (6); Husein Alatas and Joshua Suherman (8); Rafael Tilman (9); Regina Ivanova (10); Arie Untung (11); Iis Dahlia and Hedi Yunus (12); Dimas Beck, Ruben Onsu, and Ussy Sulistiawaty (13)
