= List of awards and nominations received by SM*SH =

SM*SH awards and nominations
Awards and nominations
Award	Wins	Nominations
Anugerah Musik Indonesia	0	6
Dahsyatnya Awards	2	7
Inbox Awards	12	19
Indigo Digital Music Awards	2	3
Infotainment Awards	1	5
Mnet Asian Music Awards	1	1
Nickelodeon Indonesia Kids' Choice Awards	2	4
SCTV Awards	1	5
SCTV Music Awards	6	7
YKS Romantic Awards	1	1

Totals (Note: Certain award groups do not simply award one winner. They acknowledge several different recipients, have runners-up, and have third place. Since this is a specific recognition and is different from losing an award, runner-up mentions are considered wins in this award tally. For simplification and to avoid errors, each award in this list has been presumed to have had a prior nomination.)
- Wins: 34
- Nominations: 70

SM*SH (stands for Seven Man as Seven Heroes), is an Indonesian boyband established by Starsignal on April 10, 2010. It consists of Rafael Landry Tanubrata, Bisma Karisma, Rangga Dewamoela, Dicky Muhammad Prasetya, Muhammad Reza Anugerah and Muhammad Ilham Fauzi.

== 100% Ampuh Awards ==
Year	Nominee / work	Award	Result
2013	SM*SH	Best Boyband	Won

== Anugerah MeleTOP Era ==
Presented from 2001 to 2007 during six years of vacuum, the Anugerah MeleTOP Era (formerly Anugerah Era) are an awards to recognize local celebrities in various platforms, such as music, radio, television, film and digital in Malaysia, based on website voting and SMS,

Year	Nominee / work	Award	Result
2014	SM*SH	Best Regional Artist	Nominated

== Anugerah Musik Indonesia ==
The Anugerah Musik Indonesia (English translation: Indonesian Music Awards), is an annual Indonesian major music awards. They have been compared to the American Grammy Awards and British Brit Awards. The award was formalized in 1997 by ASIRI (Association of Indonesia Recording Industry), PAPPRI (Association of Indonesian Singers, Songwriters and Music Record Producers), and KCI (Copyright Office of Indonesia). It is the highest music award given to outstanding artists in Indonesia.

Year	Nominee / work	Award	Result
2012	"I Heart You"	Best of the Best Newcomer	Nominated
2012	"I Heart You"	Best Vocal Group Production Work	Nominated
2012	SM*SH	Best of the Best Album	Nominated
2012	SM*SH	Best Pop Album	Nominated
2013	SM*SH	Best Pop Vocal Group	Nominated
2013	"Patah Hati"	Best Vocal Group Production Work	Nominated

== Anugerah Planet Muzik ==
The Anugerah Planet Muzik (English translations: Planet Music Awards) is an award ceremony for engaged artist in the Malay and Indonesian language music world. It is including singers from allied country, which are Singapore, Malaysia and Indonesia.

Year	Nominee / work	Award	Result
2014	"Hello" (feat. Stacy)	Best Collaboration (Artist)	Nominated

== Bintang RPTI Awards ==
Year	Nominee / work	Award	Result
2011	SM*SH	Favorite Star Advertisement	Won
2012	SM*SH	Celebrity Top Rating of the Year	Nominated

== Dahsyatnya Awards ==
The Dahsyatnya Awards are annual awards presented by the daily Indonesian TV show Dahsyat that airs on RCTI. SM*SH has received two awards from 7 nominations.

Year	Nominee / work	Award	Result
2011	SM*SH	Outstanding Stage Act	Nominated
2012	SM*SH	Outstanding Boyband	Won
2013	SM*SH	Outstanding Boyband	Won
2013	"Ada Cinta"	Outstanding Video Clip	Nominated
2013	"Ada Cinta"	Outstanding Video Clip Director	Nominated
2014	"Rindu Ini"	Outstanding Song	Nominated
2014	SM*SH	Outstanding Boyband/Girlband	Nominated

== Grazia Glitz & Glam Awards ==
Year	Nominee / work	Award	Result
2011	SM*SH	The Hottest Artist	Won

== Inbox Awards ==
First established in 2008, the Inbox Awards are an awards were presented by Indonesian TV station SCTV for talent artist in music and entertainment based on audience votes. SM*SH has received twelve awards from 19 nominations.

Year	Nominee / work	Award	Result
2011	SM*SH	Most Inbox Boyband	Won
2011	SM*SH	Most Inbox Newcomer	Won
2011	SM*SH	Most Inbox Appearance	Won
2011	"I Heart You"	Most Inbox Song	Won
2012	SM*SH	Most Inbox Boyband	Won
2012	SM*SH	Most Inbox Appearance	Won
2012	"Ahhh"	Most Inbox Song	Won
2012	SM*SHBLAST	Most Inbox Fanbase	Won
2013	SM*SH	Most Inbox Boyband	Nominated
2013	SM*SH	Most Inbox Appearance	Nominated
2013	SM*SHBLAST	Most Inbox Fanbase	Won
2014	SM*SH	Most Inbox Boyband	Nominated
2014	Rafael SM*SH	Most Inbox Host	Won
2014	Rangga SM*SH	Most Inbox Host	Nominated
2014	SM*SHBLAST	Most Inbox Fanbase	Won
2015	SM*SH	Most Inbox Boyband/Girlband	Nominated
2015	SM*SH	Most Inbox Darling Social Media Artist	Nominated
2015	Rangga SM*SH	Most Inbox Host	Nominated
2015	SM*SHBLAST	Most Inbox Fanbase	Won

== Indigo Digital Music Awards ==
The Indigo Digital Music Awards is an award given to artists, who have their song used most as ringtone tones. SM*SH has received two awards from 3 nominations.

Year	Nominee / work	Award	Result
2011	SM*SH	Best Newcomer	Won
2011	SM*SH	Best Duo/Group	Won
2011	"I Heart You"	Best Video	Nominated

== Infotainment Awards ==
The Infotainment Awards is an award presented by SCTV since 2012. SM*SH has received one award from 5 nominations.

Year	Nominee / work	Award	Result
2012	SM*SH	Most Infotainment Celebrity	Nominated
2012	SM*SH	Most Infotainment Newcomer Celebrity	Won
2012	SM*SH	Most Infotainment Dressed Celebrity	Nominated
2014	SM*SH	Most Fashionable Male Celebrity	Nominated
2015	Rangga SM*SH	Most Fashionable Male Celebrity	Nominated

== Insert Awards ==
Year	Nominee / work	Award	Result
2011	SM*SH	The Rising Star	Won
2012	SM*SH	Celebrity of the Year	Nominated
2013	SM*SH	Celebrity of the Year	Nominated

== KLIK! Awards ==
Year	Nominee / work	Award	Result
2011	"I Heart You"	Best Phenomenal Singer Artist	Nominated
2013	"Rindu Ini"	Favorite Pop Video	Won

== Mnet Asian Music Awards ==
Mnet Asian Music Awards (commonly abbreviated as MAMA), is a major annual K-pop music award from Mnet Media. SM*SH has received one award.

Year	Nominee / work	Award	Result
2013	SM*SH	Best Asian Artist (Indonesia)	Won

== Nickelodeon Indonesia Kids' Choice Awards ==
The Nickelodeon Indonesia Kids' Choice Awards is Indonesian version of Nickelodeon Kids' Choice Awards, held since 2008 in Jakarta. SM*SH has received two awards from 4 nominations.

Year	Nominee / work	Award	Result
2011	SM*SH	Favorite Duo/Group/Band	Won
2011	SM*SH	Slime Star	Won
2012	SM*SH	Favorite Boyband	Nominated
2013	SM*SH	Favorite Boyband/Girlband	Nominated

== Panasonic Gobel Awards ==
The Panasonic Gobel Awards is an award presented to television programs and individuals, based on poll results. The poll was originally conducted by the Indonesian tabloid Citra, but was taken over by Nielsen Media Research in 2004. SM*SH has received one award.

Year	Nominee / work	Award	Result
2013	SM*SH Ngabuburit Season 2	Favorite Hobby and Lifestyle Program	Won

== SCTV Awards ==
The SCTV Awards is an award given by the Indonesian television station SCTV, based on audience votes. SM*SH has received one award from 5 nominations.

Year	Nominee / work	Award	Result
2012	SM*SH	Famous Boyband/Girlband	Won
2013	SM*SH	Famous Boyband/Girlband	Nominated
2014	SM*SH	Famous Boyband/Girlband	Nominated
2014	Rafael SM*SH	Famous Presenter	Nominated
2014	Rangga SM*SH	Famous Presenter	Nominated

== SCTV Music Awards ==
The SCTV Music Awards is an award given by Indonesian television station SCTV to popular songs, albums, and artists based on audience votes through SMS. SM*SH has received six awards from 7 nominations.

Year	Nominee / work	Award	Result
2012	SM*SH	Most Famous Newcomer Album	Won
2012	SM*SH	Most Famous Boyband Album	Won
2012	"Senyum Semangat"	Most Famous Song	Won
2013	SM*SH	Most Famous Boyband	Nominated
2013	"Rindu Ini"	Most Famous Song	Won
2014	SM*SH	Most Famous Boyband/Girlband	Won
2015	SM*SH	Most Famous Boyband/Girlband	Won

== Yahoo! OMG Awards ==
Presented by Yahoo! Indonesia on 2012, the Yahoo! OMG Awards are an annual online awards have been presenting to celebrity who recognize as appreciated in entertainment. It is based on voted by fans in Yahoo! website.

Year	Nominee / work	Award	Result
2012	SM*SH	Favorite Group	Nominated

== YKS Romantic Awards ==
The YKS Romantic Awards is an awards show presented by Yuk Keep Smile, a TV show which is broadcast on Trans TV. The awards show is held on February 14 every year to coincide with Valentine's Day. SM*SH has received one award.

Year	Nominee / work	Award	Result
2014	SM*SH	Most Awesome Appearance	Won
