= List of I Can See Your Voice Indonesia episodes =

Television game show episode list

About the series
- I Can See Your Voice Indonesia is an Indonesian television mystery music game show broadcast by MNCTV, featuring its format based on the South Korean programme of the same title.
- More about the series

Episodes overview
- Total episode(s): 79
- Aired episode(s): 78
- Special episode(s): 1

The Indonesian television mystery music game show I Can See Your Voice Indonesia has played a total of five seasons and 79 episodes; broadcasting on MNCTV from 29 August 2016 to 12 April 2021.

Throughout its broadcast, the Indonesian adaptation played the first game featuring an entire lineup of kids as mystery singers, as well as the first two games playing under "battle format" in an existing counterpart of I Can See Your Voice, (Note: In the special episodes: In kids special (of the 2nd season), it was played by fellow child guest artist Romaria Simbolon on 24 June 2017.; Devano Danendra defeated Iis Dahlia in its first episode under "battle format" (of the 3rd season) on 17 June 2018.) since its introduction in Giọng ải giọng ai.

== Series overview ==
Series	Episodes		Originally released		Good singers	Bad singers
Series	Episodes		First released	Last released	Good singers	Bad singers
1	13		29 August 2016	21 November 2016	9	4
2	19 (Note: The 2nd season has originally scheduled to air for 13 episodes, with Ayu Ting Ting playing on its tentative [13th episode] finale on 24 April 2017; this was later added by 7 episodes until the formal conclusion on 1 July 2017.)	13	30 January 2017	24 April 2017	11	9
2	19	6	15 May 2017	1 July 2017	11	9
3	18		11 March 2018	16 July 2018	12	8
4	16		31 December 2018	19 April 2019	8	9
5	12		25 January 2021	12 April 2021	7	6
Special			24 June 2017		1	0

== Episodes ==
=== Season 1 (2016) ===
List of season 1 episodes
No. overall	No. in season	Guest artist(s)	Player order (Note: It refers to the guest artist(s) that have played in according to their first game; returning guest artists (which also include foreigners or former good singers, with their names displaying in italics) are not counted.)	Original release date
1	1	Be3	1	29 August 2016
2	2	Vina Panduwinata	2	5 September 2016
3	3	Delon Thamrin	3	12 September 2016
4	4	Katon Bagaskara	4	19 September 2016
5	5	Rizky Febian	5	26 September 2016
6	6	Virzha	6	3 October 2016
7	7	Charly van Houten	7	10 October 2016
8	8	Armand Maulana	8	17 October 2016
9	9	Ikang Fawzi	9	24 October 2016
10	10	Cita Citata	10	31 October 2016
11	11	Fatin Shidqia	11	7 November 2016
12	12	Cakra Khan	12	14 November 2016
13	13	Melly Goeslaw	13	21 November 2016

=== Season 2 (2017) ===
List of season 2 episodes
No. overall	No. in season	Guest artist(s)	Player order	Original release date
Part 1
14	1	Vidi Aldiano	14	30 January 2017
15	2	Bebi Romeo	15	6 February 2017
16	3	Armada	16	13 February 2017
17	4	Marcell Siahaan	17	20 February 2017
18	5	Anji	18	27 February 2017
19	6	Rio Febrian	19	6 March 2017
20	7	GAC	20	13 March 2017
21	8	Ridho Rhoma	21	20 March 2017
22	9	Zaskia Gotik	22	27 March 2017
23	10	Inul Daratista	23	3 April 2017
24	11	D'Masiv	24	10 April 2017
25	12	Iyeth Bustami	25	17 April 2017
26	13	Ayu Ting Ting	26	24 April 2017
Part 2
27	14	Siti Badriah	27	15 May 2017
28	15	JKT48	28	27 May 2017
29	16	Wali	29	3 June 2017
30	17	Iis Dahlia	30	10 June 2017
31	18	Hedi Yunus	31	17 June 2017
32	19	Mulan Jameela	33	1 July 2017

=== Season 3 (2018) ===
List of season 3 episodes
No. overall	No. in season	Guest artist(s)	Player order	Original release date
33	1	Ashanty and Anang Hermansyah	34–35	11 March 2018
34	2	Zian Spectre	36	24 March 2018
35	3	Erie Suzan	37	31 March 2018
36	4	Ihsan Tarore	38	7 April 2018
37	5	Jenita Janet	39	14 April 2018
38	6	Regina Ivanova	40	21 April 2018
39	7	Hanin Dhiya	41	28 April 2018
40	8	Rita Sugiarto	42	5 May 2018
41	9	RizkiRidho (Rizki and Ridho Syafaruddin)	43–44	19 May 2018
42	10	Kristina Iswandari	45	26 May 2018
43	11	Denada	46	3 June 2018
44	12	Titi DJ	47	10 June 2018
45	13	Iis Dahlia vs. Devano Danendra	48	17 June 2018
46	14	Maria Simorangkir	49	24 June 2018
47	15	Ahmad Abdul	50	1 July 2018
48	16	Andhika Pratama and Ussy Sulistiawaty	51–52	8 July 2018
49	17	Bertha Herawati	53	15 July 2018
50	18	GAC vs. The Overtunes	54	16 July 2018

=== Season 4 (2018–19) ===
List of season 4 episodes
No. overall	No. in season	Guest artist(s)	Player order	Original release date
2018
51	1	Repvblik	55	31 December 2018
2019
52	2	Geisha	56	7 January 2019
53	3	Enda and Arlonsy (Ungu) (Note: For the show's overall highlights: Ungu designated as a group, in which different members playing on subsequent games are actually returned; Pasha was played on his 1st game as a foreigner for the Malaysian Malay-language 1st season.)	—	14 January 2019
54	4	Marion Jola	57	25 January 2019
55	5	Judika	58	1 February 2019
56	6	Brisia Jodie and Devano Danendra	59	8 February 2019
57	7	Arsy Widianto	60	15 February 2019
58	8	Cita Citata	—	22 February 2019
59	9	Vierratale	61	1 March 2019
60	10	Melly Goeslaw	—	8 March 2019
61	11	Sandhy Sondoro	62	15 March 2019
62	12	RAN	63	22 March 2019
63	13	Setia	64	29 March 2019
64	14	JKT48	—	5 April 2019
65	15	Cakra Khan	—	12 April 2019
66	16	Yovie & Nuno	65	19 April 2019

=== Season 5 (2021) ===
List of season 5 episodes
No. overall	No. in season	Guest artist(s)	Player order	Original release date
67	1	Dewi Persik	66	25 January 2021
68	2	Denny Caknan	67	1 February 2021
69	3	Iyeth Bustami	68	8 February 2021
70	4	Titi DJ	—	15 February 2021
71	5	Inul Daratista	—	22 February 2021
72	6	Maia Estianty	69	1 March 2021
73	7	Ikke Nurjanah	70	8 March 2021
74	8	Judika	—	15 March 2021
75	9	Onsu Dynasty (Betrand Peto Putra Onsu and Anneth Delliecia)	71–72	22 March 2021
76	10	Via Vallen	73	29 March 2021
77	11	Erie Suzan	—	5 April 2021
78	12	Rita Sugiarto and Alwiansyah	74	12 April 2021

== Special ==
List of special episodes
No.	Title	Guest artist(s)	Player order	Original release date
1	"Kids special"	Romaria Simbolon	32	24 June 2017
