= I Can See Your Voice Indonesia season 4 =

Television game show season

I Can See Your Voice Indonesia
- Season 4
- Starring: Wendy Armoko; Vega Darwanti; Chika Jessica; Lee Jeong-hoon; Vicky Nitinegoro
- Hosted by: Indra Herlambang; Andhika Pratama
- Winners: Good singers: 8; Bad singers: 9
- No. of episodes: 16

Release
- Original network: MNCTV
- Original release: 31 December 2018 – 19 April 2019

Season chronology
- ← Previous; Season 3 Next → Season 5

The fourth season of the Indonesian television mystery music game show I Can See Your Voice Indonesia premiered on MNCTV on 31 December 2018.

== Gameplay ==
=== Format ===
According to the original South Korean rules, the guest artist(s) must attempt to eliminate bad singers during its game phase. At the final performance, the last remaining mystery singer is revealed as either good or bad by means of a duet between them and one of the guest artists. (Note: Gameplay note: TikTok was used as a lip sync performance piece by a mystery singer.)

If the last remaining mystery singer is good, they are featured in a post-show privilege video; if a singer is bad, they win Rp 17,500,000.

=== Rounds ===
1. Visual round
  The guest artist is given some time to observe and examine each mystery singer based on their appearance.
2. Lip sync round
  Each mystery singer performs a lip sync to a song; good singers mime to a recording of their own, while bad singers mime to a backing track by another vocalist.
3. Evidence round
  A proof of each mystery singer's singing ability (i.e. photo, video, certificates, etc.) is shown on the screen. Good singers have own evidences, while bad singers had their evidences fabricated.

== Episodes ==
=== Guest artists ===
Legend:
Good singer
Bad singer

Episode		Guest artist (Note: Players' notes: For the returning guest artists (who also include foreigners and former good singers), names are displayed in italics.; For the mixed groups, names who identified as bad singers are displayed in italics.)	Mystery singers (In their respective numbers and aliases)						
#	Date	Guest artist	Elimination order						Winner
#	Date	Guest artist	Visual round		Lip sync round		Evidence round		Winner
1	31 December 2018	Repvblik	7. Raffi Fadhillah Hamzah; (Retro Youngster)	4. Zeffanya; (Disco Queen)	5. Novinda; (Classical Woman)	2. Fernando; (Old Virgin)	3. Joseph Ananta; (Ajojing Mania)	1. Dinda; (80's Brother)	6. Iga Guslia; Gypsy Lady
2	7 January 2019	Geisha	5. Lydia Pasaribu; (Sia)	1. Vien Audrey; (Ariana Grande)	3. Tri Bagus Aji; (Freddie Mercury)	4. Zahra Nurdin; (Agnez Mo)	6. Jabal Harahap; (Michael Jackson)	2. Dendi; (Armand Maulana)	7. Vania Ayu Anisah; Melly Goeslaw
3	14 January 2019	Enda and Arlonsy (Ungu) (Note: Season highlight: Ungu designated as a group, in which different members playing on subsequent games are actually returned; Pasha was played on his 1st game as a foreigner for the Malaysian Malay-language 1st season.)	4. Iskandar; (Circus Foreman)	3. Alvina Oktinita; (Flower Princess)	1. Rizqi; (Nobleman)	6. Dede; (The Soldier)	2. Cinta; (Opera Queen)	5. Daniar; (Acrobatic Lady)	7. Shabrina Leonita; Circus Diva
4	25 January 2019	Marion Jola	3. Amay; (Dangdut Singer)	2. Jesika Indriani Silitonga; (Koplo Diva)	7. Arvian Dwi Pangestu; (K-pop Boy)	4. Eka; (Ballad Singer)	1. Della Putri Harbad; (Lady Rocker)	6. Harun Alra; (Mister Jazz)	5. Ihsan; Hip-hop Man
5	1 February 2019	Judika	2. Al Fajri; (Chikopers)	7. Lolita Erawati Anggraeni; (WC Umum)	4. Iyan Joshua Nanere; (Ayutinglicious)	6. Davit Ingsani; (Judikaholic)	3. Abby Mushaffa; (Vegalovers)	1. Rebecca Nathannia; (Vyanisty)	5. Kais Junius; Sahabat Sabyan
6	8 February 2019	Brisia Jodie and Devano Danendra	1. Nabian Risyad; (Love Savior)	7. Ardina Glenda; (Fangirl)	4. Jessica Halim; (Barbie Girl)	2. Khairunisa Tadjuddin; (Pretty Gatherer)	5. Daniel; (Masked Knight)	3. Fahmi Rois; (Mysterious Gentleman)	6. Dewi Harliwong; Love Doctor
7	15 February 2019	Arsy Widianto	6. Natalia; (Super Girl)	2. Ully Novita Siahaan; (Catwoman)	7. Raihan Safira; (Voice Hero)	4. Arya Febrian; (Masked Singer)	3. Genta; (Strong Boy)	5. Vivi; (Evening Sweetheart)	1. Andi Sunggari Bangun; Music Knight
8	22 February 2019	Cita Citata	4. Kelly Courtney; (Bridesmaid)	5. Prima; (None Betawi)	3. Guntur Arjuna; (Pager Bagus)	1. Syifa; (Pager Ayu)	7. Tanti Cinthya; (Nyai Dasima)	2. Aly Rahadi; (Groom)	6. Doha Simamora; Brother of Jakarta
9	1 March 2019	Vierratale	5. Alfian Fadlilah; (Mr. Teacher)	1. Niken Rachel; (Smart Student)	4. Gelora Jayanti; (The Best Raiser)	3. Rahmat Yogi Astra; (Young Genius)	6. Romy Angga Putra; (National Student)	2. Grace Telor Gulung; (Bookworm)	7. Gifta; Graduate
10	8 March 2019	Melly Goeslaw	5. Yudiana Aditya Prawira; (Scottish Man)	6. Neysa Harwina; (Jade Empress)	1. Sophia Utami; (Thai Daughter)	7. Al Amin; (Mongolian Prince)	4. Irfansyah Putra; (Palace Guard)	3. Mexa Trimonita; (Dutch Woman)	2. Evha Zulfikar; Indian Bride
11	15 March 2019	Sandhy Sondoro	4. Vicky Tan Huang; (Musical Actor)	5. Kiky Angela; (Stage Actress)	6. Indra Satria Birowo; (Extra)	2. Chiko Marchdiansyah; (Main Character)	3. Ayuni Jolie Hengky; (Theater Queen)	1. Yohana Vanda; (Broadway Girl)	7. Win Yovina Thopandi; Back-up Dancer
12	22 March 2019	RAN	2. Peter; (Young Funk)	3. Puja; (Stylish Girl)	1. Thomas Lakabowo; (The Handsome)	5. Daffa; (Swag Boy)	7. Olivia Simarmata, Matilda Saragih, and Yulita Amirah; (Three Virgins)	6. Leinney Roselyn; (Mellow Woman)	4. Evan Setyawan Vielly; Teen Idol
13	29 March 2019	Setia	7. Hafiel; (Handsome Cow)	5. Wahyu Yulianto; (Crazy Monster)	1. Hanna Aditya; (Pretty Duck)	2. Nana Candra; (Honeybee)	6. Heri Yanto; (Gallant Bear)	4. Geby; (Baby Shark)	3. Elizabeth; Smart Giraffe
14	5 April 2019	JKT48	2. Sabrina Panjaitan; (Bourgeois Lady)	4. Nopran; (Mainstream Guy)	3. Thalia Laurencia; (The Intensified)	7. Tabitha Roselin; (Gossip Mother)	5. Sendy Ariani; (70's Woman)	6. Muhrayna Twins; (Mustache Duo)	1. Andri Valentinus; Fandom Warrior
15	12 April 2019	Cakra Khan	6. Mochammad Ricky Maulana; (Handsome Salesman)	4. Hendra Pratama Manik; (Male Trader)	3. Solihat Affandi; (Fine Dancer)	1. Naufal; (Balinese Brother)	5. Herdyantiara Mardhika; (Dayak Princess)	7. Fransiska Kirana and Shania Aryanto; (Joint Duo)	2. Hanna Cynthia Panjaitan; Female Trader
16	19 April 2019	Yovie & Nuno	4. Aldhi Iskandar; (The Cunning)	7. Fahira Arizhani; (Queen of Wrath)	3. Veneranda Sarah; (Jasmine Princess)	5. Thatha Saputra; (Viking Force)	2. Tiara Fidya; (Indian Girl)	1. Kia Francis; (Chieftain)	6. David and Dian; Romantic Couple

=== Panelists ===
Legend:
Regular panelist
Guest panelist

Apps		Panelists in attendance (Sorted by first appearance, with episode designations)
g#	p#	Panelists in attendance (Sorted by first appearance, with episode designations)
16	1	Wendy Armoko (1–16)
15	1	Lee Jeong-hoon (Note: Panelists' note: Foreign attendee: Lee Jeong-hoon (ROK)) (1–11, 13–16)
14	2	Vicky Nitinegoro (1, 3–6, 8–16); Chika Jessica (2–14, 16)
10	1	Vega Darwanti (5, 7–14, 16)
7	1	Rina Nose (1–4, 9–10, 12)
6	1	Ayu Ting Ting (5, 7, 11, 13–14, 16)
4	1	Deswita Maharani (6, 8, 15–16)
3	2	Ria Ricis (1, 3–4); Anwar Sanjaya (5–6, 15)
1	11	Ghea Indrawari (1); Bianca Liza, Putri Ayu Silaen, and Billy Syahputra (2); Syifa Hadju (3); Bastian Simbolon (4); Denny Wahyudi (6); Ivan Gunawan (7); Edric Tjandra (8); Melaney Ricardo (9); Maria Simorangkir (15)
