= I Can See Your Voice Indonesia season 2 =

Television game show season

I Can See Your Voice Indonesia
- Season 2
- Starring: Wendy Armoko; Vega Darwanti; Lee Jeong-hoon; Ayu Ting Ting
- Hosted by: Raffi Ahmad; Indra Herlambang
- Winners: Good singers: 12; Bad singers: 9
- No. of episodes: Regular: 19; Special: 1; Overall: 20

Release
- Original network: MNCTV
- Original release: Part 1: 30 January – 24 April 2017; Part 2: 15 May – 1 July 2017

Season chronology
- ← Previous; Season 1 Next → Season 3

The second season of the Indonesian television mystery music game show I Can See Your Voice Indonesia premiered on MNCTV with first set of episodes on 30 January 2017, followed by a second that resumed on 15 May 2017. (Note: The 2nd season has originally scheduled to air for 13 episodes, as Ayu Ting Ting played on its tentative [13th episode] finale on 24 April 2017; this was then added by 7 episodes until the formal conclusion on 1 July 2017.)

This season also featured the first game with an entire lineup of kids as mystery singers, played by fellow child guest artist Romaria Simbolon.

== Gameplay ==
=== Format ===
According to the original South Korean rules, the guest artist(s) must attempt to eliminate bad singers during its game phase. At the final performance, the last remaining mystery singer is revealed as either good or bad by means of a duet between them and one of the guest artists. (Note: Gameplay note: The number of mystery singers are set to seven (for the rest of episodes) or eight (ep. 13).)

If the last remaining mystery singer is good, they are featured in a post-show privilege video; if a singer is bad, they win Rp 17,500,000.

=== Rounds ===
1. Visual round
  The guest artist is given some time to observe and examine each mystery singer based on their appearance.
2. Lip sync round
  Each mystery singer performs a lip sync to a song; good singers mime to a recording of their own, while bad singers mime to a backing track by another vocalist.
3. Evidence round
  A proof of each mystery singer's singing ability (i.e. photo, video, certificates, etc.) is shown on the screen. Good singers have own evidences, while bad singers had their evidences fabricated.

== Episodes ==
=== Guest artists ===
Legend:
Good singer
Bad singer

Episode		Guest artist (Note: Players' notes: For the returning guest artists (who also include foreigners and former good singers), names are displayed in italics.; For the mixed groups, names who identified as bad singers are displayed in italics.)	Mystery singers (In their respective numbers and aliases)							
#	Date	Guest artist	Elimination order							Winner
#	Date	Guest artist	Visual round		Lip sync round			Evidence round		Winner
Part 1
1	30 January 2017	Vidi Aldiano	4. Vira; (Candy Girl)		2. Eza; (Love Fighter)	5. Jeremy Sianipar; (Perfect Man)	1. Sofie; (Summer Girl)	3. Palupi; (Angel of Heart)	6. Martha Ivana Sitanggang; (The Finch)	7. Marsha; Dream Seeker
2	6 February 2017	Bebi Romeo	7. Bagus; (Blue Fire)		3. Waode Heni Andraini; (Purple Love)	4. Shabrina; (Pinky Girl)	5. Fauzi; (Man in Black)	2. Lady; (Lady in Red)	1. Agisnia Nur Azizah; (Yellow Queen)	6. Shelby Aditya; Snow White
3	13 February 2017	Armada	2. Sonia; (Sailor Moon)		5. Falah; (Dracula)	4. Olivia; (Tinkerbell)	3. Rangga; (Pinocchio)	7. Sandra; (Cleopatra)	6. Jaclyn; (Mulan)	1. Wulan; Elsa
4	20 February 2017	Marcell Siahaan	3. Julie; (Sweetheart)		4. Livia; (Oriental Doll)	1. Hendry; (Blues' Prince)	6. Shella; (Magic Voice)	7. Kevin; (The Baritone)	2. Afni; (Beat Girl)	5. Feby; Golden Girl
5	27 February 2017	Anji	2. Fahriza; (Rocker Guy)		1. Alisha; (Salsa Girl)	3. Agnes; (Sound of Beauty)	4. Lie Buntharan; (Prince of Pop)	5. Jonathan; (Acapella Man)	7. Sherly; (Dynamic Soloist)	6. Muhammad; Soulful Boy
6	6 March 2017	Rio Febrian	5. Jeremiah Frans Butar-butar; (Rucky)		1. Ari Yunda; (Arjuna's Playboy)	7. Melati; (Church Queen)	2. Cecilia; (Juwita's Night)	3. Nanda; (Widuri)	4. Bella; (Sephia)	6. Roza; Brother Toyib
7	13 March 2017	GAC	6. Vina; (Covergirl)		3. Joseph; (The Cowboy)	1. Jeffry; (Beach Boy)	5. Romansa; (Real Man)	2. Putri; (Dreamgirl)	4. Waode Hasriani; (Broadway Girl)	7. Devi and Bunga; Soul Sisters
8	20 March 2017	Ridho Rhoma	1. Yudi Kurniawan; (Beggar of Love)		6. Hikmah; (Wulan is Missing)	7. Febrika Limbong; (Conscience)	3. Reynaldy Prasetya Putra; (Brother Mustache)	5. Irfan Adrian; (Zaenal)	4. Imas Dewi Purwati; (Lotus)	2. Fanny Firgina Aura; Laila is Awkward
9	27 March 2017	Zaskia Gotik	2. Eltasia Natasha; (Last Flower)		6. Nasha Aqila; (Pretty Doll)	5. Jovi Putra Darupa; (The Itikers)	1. Yogi Mulya Tamaki; (Gaul's Father)	3. Nattaya Laksita Melati; (Sambalado Girl)	7. Yanuar Reno Dharmawan; (Existing Singer)	4. Andy Muhammad Fadly; Oppa Hits
10	3 April 2017	Inul Daratista	5. Niken Aprillia; (American Doll)		7. Wildan; (Italian Chef)	1. Ridho Rohanna; (Princess India)	2. Irfan El-Hazmi; (Chinese Idol)	4. Miftah Farid; (Korean Boy)	6. Rani Septia Arriani; (Japanese Girl)	3. Mutik Nida; Arabian Singer
11	10 April 2017	D'Masiv	1. Mohammad Ishak Malewa; (Guitarist #1)		2. Annisa Chaca; (Vocal Coach)	4. Ingga Pratama; (Rhythm Boy)	3. Eunike Pardede; (Famous Vocalist)	6. Brigitta Baruna; (Keyboard Master)	5. Muhammad Rahmat Ongky; (Musical Producer)	7. Mairoza Oktafia; Bass Queen
12	17 April 2017	Iyeth Bustami	6. Heru; (Tenor Barista)		2. Gancar Asa Negara; (Close-up Singer)	5. Erna Melody; (Piano Guru)	1. Eliz Alyssia Ibrahim; (First Class Voice)	4. Salsa Al-Fathalia; (Music Student)	3. Mochammad Abdulwahid; (Harmony Course)	7. Ilham Famouzy; Sound Mechanic
13	24 April 2017	Ayu Ting Ting	8. Lebri Partami; (Putri Gaga)	4. Banu Setiawan; (Justin Blender)	6. Gek Nadia Aryasa; (Titi Dieja)	7. Ifa; (Agnes Monyanyi)	3. Fia Ramona Lavigne; (Katy Peres)	2. Giga Adriel; (Afgan Ga'syah)	5. Rando Sembiring; (Shaheer Sekali)	1. Lorena Relouw; Mak Donna
Part 2
14	15 May 2017	Siti Badriah	2. Arnetta; (Koplo Queen)		5. Krisna Diertama; (Love Humming)	4. Ani Fitriani; (North Coast Flower)	6. Wisnu Tam; (Malaysian Singer)	3. Tinah Agustinah; (Rocking Princess)	7. Rikhie Adrian Devgan; (Rhythm Poet)	1. Dwi Ratna; Sad Melody
15	27 May 2017	JKT48	2. Benny Setyo Putro; (One Voice)		1. Rafi Fridanhus; (Note Printer)	5. Novia Prasetya; (Japanese Idol)	7. Paramitha Pradestina; (Kawaii Sound)	3. Sherina Debora Saragih; (Soprano Girl)	4. Ayu Tito Septiani; (Senior Vocalist)	6. Bhayu Handrian; Voice Detective
16	3 June 2017	Wali	4. Debora Chrisna; (Yank)		2. Putri Sartono; (Guardian)	1. Dara Brillian Pramesty; (Halal Lover)	5. Bagir Bafadhal; (Matchmaker)	3. Epul Rahman; (The Udin)	7. Ruri Personal; (Grandma's Hero)	6. Janice Priska; Agate Queen
17	10 June 2017	Iis Dahlia	5. Dimas Revano; (Senior Single)		1. Jefry Apriani; (What a Youngster)	2. Zara Annisa; (Nurlela)	4. Sheila Susanti; (Lonesome)	6. Haqqi; (Uninvited Guest)	3. Elsya Sandria; (Black Umbrella)	7. Okky Dwi Prabowo; The Arjun
18	17 June 2017	Hedi Yunus	2. Moza Orvili Jenira; (The Dove)		3. Zinnia Aribaten; (Letter Receiver)	4. Yopi Widianto; (Star of Life)	1. Teuku Akbar Santana; (Mr. Bad Luck)	7. Gabriella Saragih; (The Beautiful)	5. Herlinda; (Soulmate)	6. Inggid Wakano; The Most Beautiful Ex
Special	24 June 2017	Romaria Simbolon	4. Rifat; (Prodigy)		1. Zahra Izzaty; (Little Princess)	5. Fika Farihka; (Little Diva)	6. Ayesha Wibowo; (Naura's Wannabe)	7. Benaya; (The Cayenne Pepper	2. Jemima; (The Idol)	3. Danisa Brillian Putri; Supergirl
19	1 July 2017	Mulan Jameela	1. Ridwan Dharmawan; (Vocal Genius)		4. Indah Galinda and Putri Galinda; (Queen Duo)	5. Elvan Saragih; (Masculine Voice)	6. Bella Vania; (Wonder Girl)	3. Gusti; (The Maestro)	7. Haqqi; (Note Idol)	2. Natasha Cleodiva; Vocal Darling

=== Panelists ===
Legend:
Regular panelist
Guest panelist

Apps		Panelists in attendance (Sorted by first appearance, with episode designations)
g#	p#	Panelists in attendance (Sorted by first appearance, with episode designations)
20	2	Wendy Armoko and Lee Jeong-hoon (Note: Panelists' note: Foreign attendees: Haruka Nakagawa (JPN) and Lee Jeong-hoon (ROK)) (1–19; sp. 1)
19	2	Ayu Ting Ting (1–12, 14–19; sp. 1); Vega Darwanti (1–17, 19; sp. 1)
6	1	Ruben Onsu (10, 13–15, 17, 19)
3	1	Bianca Liza (5, 14, 18)
2	8	Melody (JKT48) (1, 11); Cici Panda (2, 9); Gracia Indri (2, 18); Donna Agnesia (3, 17); Jessica Iskandar (4, 8); Denada (7, sp. 1); Melaney Ricardo (10, 13); Sarwendah Tan (18–19)
1	31	Marcel Chandrawinata (1); Delon Thamrin (2); Haruka Nakagawa and Vicky Shu (3); Husein Alatas and Winda Viska (4); Aura Kasih and Leo Consul (5); Gisella Anastasia, Gading Marten, and Ersa Mayori (6); Widi Mulia and Ihsan Tarore (7); Denny Wahyudi (8); Tara Budiman and Meisya Siregar (9); Olla Ramlan (10); Kartika Putri and Fero Walandouw (11); Deswita Maharani, Anwar Sanjaya, and Erie Suzan (12); Ayu Dewi (13); Rafael Tilman (14); Luna Maya and Rendy Pandugo (15); Anya Dwinov and Andhika Pratama (16); Tina Toon (17); Bastian Simbolon and Fitri Tropica (sp. 1)
