= I Can See Your Voice Indonesia =

Indonesian television game show

- Based on: I Can See Your Voice by CJ ENM
- Directed by: Endah Hari Utami
- Presented by: Raffi Ahmad (1–3, 5); Indra Herlambang(1–5); Andhika Pratama (4)
- Starring: The celebrity panelists (see cast)
- Country of origin: Indonesia
- Original language: Indonesian
- No. of seasons: 5
- No. of episodes: Regular: 78; Special: 1; Overall: 79

Production
- Executive producer: Michael Sitorus
- Producer: Maartvi Prastowo
- Camera setup: Multi-camera

Original release
- Network: MNCTV
- Release: 29 August 2016 – 12 April 2021

Related
- I Can See Your Voice franchise

I Can See Your Voice Indonesia is an Indonesian television mystery music game show based on the South Korean programme of the same title, in which guest artists attempt to identify and eliminate bad singers from a group of mystery singers. The last artist remaining performs a duet with the guest artist. It first aired on MNCTV on 29 August 2016.

== Gameplay ==
=== Format ===
Over the course of several rounds, the guest artists must attempt to eliminate bad singers from a group of "mystery singers," identified only by their occupations or aliases, without ever hearing them perform live. They are assisted by clues regarding the singers' backgrounds, style of performance, and observations from a celebrity panel. At the end of a game, the last remaining mystery singer is revealed as either good or bad by means of a duet between them and one of the guest artists. (Note: For the show's gameplay changes, based on playing time of an episode: The number of mystery singers are set to six (for the 5th season), seven (from 1st to 4th season), or eight (from 1st to 2nd season).; The number of rounds are set to three (from 2nd, 4th to 5th seasons) or four (for the 1st and 3rd seasons).; In the 4th season, TikTok was used as a lip sync performance piece by a mystery singer.; The winning bad singer gets Rp 17,500,000 (from 1st to 4th season) or Rp 10,000,000 (for the 5th season).)

For games played under the "battle format" (from Giọng ải giọng ai; season 3 only), two opposing guest artists eliminate one singer each during the proper game phase, and then keep one singer each to join the final performance. The winner is determined by the remaining mystery singers, who are chosen by opposing guest artists, as per specific winning condition depends on the outcome of their final performance, if:

1. One opposing guest artist kept a good singer and the other had a bad singer, or
2. Both opposing guest artists kept good or bad singers.

If the last remaining mystery singer is good, they are featured in a post-show privilege video; if the singer is bad, they win a cash prize.

=== Rounds ===
==== Visual round ====
- s1–5: The guest artist is given some time to observe and examine each mystery singer based on their appearance.
- s1: A muted video of each mystery singer that reveals only 0.3 seconds of their singing voice is played as an additional hint.

==== Lip sync rounds ====
- s1–4: Each mystery singer performs a lip sync to a song; good singers mime to a recording of their own, while bad singers mime to a backing track by another vocalist.
- s5: The mystery singer lip syncs to the good singer's recording, then a bad singer's recording comes in the middle of the performance.

==== Evidence round ====
- s1–4: A proof of each mystery singer's singing ability (i.e. photo, video, certificates, etc.) is shown on the screen. Good singers have own evidences, while bad singers had their evidences fabricated.

==== Rehearsal rounds ====
- s3: Three random panelists are wearing headphones to listen to a recording of assigned mystery singer that lasts for 30 seconds. Afterward, the panelist defends the mystery singer and convince the guest artist to choose them for a final performance.
- s5: The guest artist is presented with video from a recording session by one of the mystery singers, but pitch-shifted to obscure their actual vocals.

== Production ==
The Chosun Ilbo provisionally announced an Indonesian adaptation of I Can See Your Voice in a lead-up to the (South Korean) third season of the same title in March 2016; this was subsequently confirmed by Media Nusantara Citra in July 2016.

== Broadcast history ==
I Can See Your Voice Indonesia debuted on 28 August 2016, with filming taking place at MNC Studios in Kebon Jeruk, Jakarta.

The second season premiered with its first set of episodes on 30 January 2017, followed by a second that resumed on 15 May 2017. (Note: The second season was originally scheduled to air for 13 episodes, with Ayu Ting Ting playing on its tentative [13th episode] finale on 24 April 2017; this was later added by 7 episodes until the formal conclusion on 1 July 2017.) Romaria Simbolon played in its first episode featuring an entire lineup of kids as mystery singers on 24 June 2017.

In the third season that premiered on 11 March 2018, two games were played under the "battle format" — the first was Devano Danendra defeating Iis Dahlia on 17 June 2018, and the second was GAC also defeating The Overtunes in its finale on 16 July 2018, as part of MNCTV's Eid al-Fitr programming lineup. The fourth season premiered on the last day of 2018, with the following episodes being aired in 2019.

The fifth season was originally scheduled to premiere on 18 January 2021, but it was pushed back later to 25 January 2021; this also conducted a competitive event called I Can See Your Talent in collaboration with Bigo Live, from 12 to 21 March 2021. At the time of production during the COVID-19 pandemic, health and safety protocols had also implemented.

== Cast ==
The series employs a panel of celebrity "detectives" who assist the guest artists in identifying good and bad mystery singers throughout the game. Along with regular members, guest panelists also appear since the first season. Overall, 11 celebrities have served as panelists, with their original lineup consisting of Wendy Armoko, Vega Darwanti, Lee Jeong-hoon, and Ayu Ting Ting. Later members who joined the group's duties also include Julia Perez, Zaskia Gotik — from the 1st season; Anwar Sanjaya from the 3rd season; Chika Jessica, Vicky Nitinegoro — from the 4th season; Ivan Gunawan and Okky Lukman — from the 5th season.

Designations:
Main cast member	H Hosting duties
Additional cast member	g# Total games attended, by panelists

Cast member	Seasons				
Cast member	1	2	3	4	5
Raffi Ahmad	H	H	H		H
Indra Herlambang	H	H	H	H	H
Wendy Armoko	13	20	15	16	9
Vega Darwanti	8	19	14	10	10
Lee Jeong-hoon (Note: Foreign panelists: South Korea — Lee Jeong-hoon)	8	20	17	15	
Julia Perez	7				
Ayu Ting Ting	13	19	18		
Zaskia Gotik	8				
Anwar Sanjaya			12		
Andhika Pratama				H	
Chika Jessica				14	
Vicky Nitinegoro				14	
Ivan Gunawan					11
Okky Lukman					12

== Series overview ==
Series	Episodes		Originally released		Good singers	Bad singers
Series	Episodes		First released	Last released	Good singers	Bad singers
1	13		29 August 2016	21 November 2016	9	4
2	19	13	30 January 2017	24 April 2017	11	9
2	19	6	15 May 2017	1 July 2017	11	9
3	18		11 March 2018	16 July 2018	12	8
4	16		31 December 2018	19 April 2019	8	9
5	12		25 January 2021	12 April 2021	7	6
Special			24 June 2017		1	0
