= I Heart You =

I Heart You may refer to:

- "I Heart You" (Toni Braxton song), 2012
- "I Heart You" (SM*SH song), 2010
- I Heart You (album), a 2014 album by Daniel Padilla
