= I Can See Your Voice Indonesia season 5 =

Television game show season

I Can See Your Voice Indonesia
- Season 5
- Starring: Wendy Armoko; Vega Darwanti; Ivan Gunawan; Okky Lukman
- Hosted by: Raffi Ahmad; Indra Herlambang
- Winners: Good singers: 7; Bad singers: 6
- Companion show: I Can See Your Talent (singing competition)
- No. of episodes: 12

Release
- Original network: MNCTV
- Original release: 25 January – 12 April 2021

Season chronology
- ← Previous; Season 4

The fifth season of the Indonesian television mystery music game show I Can See Your Voice Indonesia was originally scheduled to premiere on MNCTV on 18 January 2021, but it was pushed back later to 25 January 2021.

At the time of filming during the COVID-19 pandemic, health and safety protocols are also implemented.

== Gameplay ==
=== Format ===
According to the original South Korean rules, the guest artist(s) must attempt to eliminate bad singers during its game phase. At the final performance, the last remaining mystery singer is revealed as either good or bad by means of a duet between them and one of the guest artists.

If the last remaining mystery singer is good, they are featured in a post-show privilege video; if a singer is bad, they win Rp 10,000,000.

=== Rounds ===
1. Visual round
  The guest artist is given some time to observe and examine each mystery singer based on their appearance.
2. Lip sync round
  The mystery singer lip syncs to the good singer's recording, then a bad singer's recording comes in the middle of the performance.
3. Rehearsal round
  The guest artist is presented with video from a recording session by one of the mystery singers, but pitch-shifted to obscure their actual vocals.

== Episodes ==
=== Guest artists ===
| Legend: |
Good singer
Bad singer

| Episode | | Guest artist (Note: Players' notes: For the returning guest artists (who also include foreigners and former good singers), names are displayed in italics.; For the mixed groups, names who identified as bad singers are displayed in italics.) | Mystery singers (In their respective numbers and aliases) | | | | | |
| # | Date | Guest artist | Elimination order | | | | | Winner |
| # | Date | Guest artist | Visual round | Lip sync round | | Rehearsal round | | Winner |
|---|---|---|---|---|---|---|---|---|
| 1 | 25 January 2021 | Dewi Persik | 5. Lala Kayang; (Lively Singer) | 2. Aliumar Al-Aidrus; (Basketball Brother) | 3. Irfan Jamaludin; (Dangdut Sailor) | 6. Yuni Rosa Nursanti; (Hijab Diva) | 4. Aldo Ferdian Putra; (Gang Leader) | 1. Ayu Nopitasari; Country Flower |
| 2 | 1 February 2021 | Denny Caknan | 2. Junko Agus; (PE Teacher) | 5. Fariz Rabil Putra and Arvian Dwi Pangestu; (Retro Twins) | 1. Wika Erma Desiska; (Fruit Picker) | 4. Rommy Hermawan; (Selfie Boy) | 6. Jennifer Podung; (Disco Banger) | 3. Alfina Yuliana; Kartonyono's Friend |
| 3 | 8 February 2021 | Iyeth Bustami | 1. Annisa Nurfauzi; (Laila is Awkward) | 5. Kiki Ameera; (Ms. Malaysia) | 3. Aldy Wahyudi; (Social Security Idol) | 2. Chaca Nur Sadah; (Nirmala) | 4. Beni Ahmad Azhar; (Lady Dreamer) | 6. Jeremy Jovian; Admiral King |
| 4 | 15 February 2021 | Titi DJ | 6. Aisyah Miftahul; (Heart Language) | 3. Zulkifar Khasan; (Master Lambad) | 2. Suci Dzikriani; (Tapering Diva) | 4. Sherina Alifia; (Pretty Woman) | 1. Rinto Andhika; (God's Incarnation) | 5. Luthfi Fadillah; Leo Boy |
| 5 | 22 February 2021 | Inul Daratista | 4. Isman Rahadi; (Stumping Playboy) | 6. Super Emak; (Madame Dangdut) | 3. Tigor Christofer; (Sweet Mustache) | 1. Leora Wijaya; (White Rose) | 2. Farras Syafigur Raihan; (Boom Boom Boy) | 5. Khafilah Elsa and Dimas Sutiawan; United Hearts |
| 6 | 1 March 2021 | Maia Estianty | 2. Hizkia Gultom; (Friends with Benefits) | 4. Trifena Alfasan and Trifosa Alfasan; (Spoiled Twins) | 6. Muhammad Asary Afif; (Hooligan) | 3. Aura Zakkaha; (The Cute) | 5. Axin Ferry; (Secret Boyfriend) | 1. Marinna Umi; The Tempter |
| 7 | 8 March 2021 | Ikke Nurjanah | 3. Junisa Fitri; (Conqueror of Hearts) | 6. Osaka Hayer; (Number 1) | 4. Shreya Maya; (Dahlia Flower) | 1. Dhika Herdi; (Romantic Poet) | 2. Rachel Fira Medioyan; (Newlywed) | 5. Agus Rustandi; Love Seeker |
| 8 | 15 March 2021 | Judika | 5. Jogi Simanjuntak; (Mapala) | 3. Raden Inggarputri; (Young Medanese) | 2. Vien Audrey and Yongki Vincent; (Heart and Love) | 6. Inka Christie; (The Poet) | 1. Eldwin Nugraha; (The Champion) | 4. Noferianus Hura; The Second Victor |
| 9 | 22 March 2021 | Onsu Dynasty (Betrand Peto Putra Onsu and Anneth Delliecia) | 3. Syifa Afiyah; (Millenial Girl) | 1. Farrel Nugroho; (Little Idol) | 4. Intan Salwa; (National Child) | 2. Niken Salindri; (Young Friend) | 5. Rama Dani; (Cool Boy) | 6. Ruth Manurung; Senior Hits |
| 10 | 29 March 2021 | Via Vallen | 3. Sam Hasibuan; (Entertainer) | 2. Nabila Maharani; (Superstar) | 5. Yudha Prawira; (Handsome Mechanic) | 1. Meyrani Utami; (Cover Mania) | 4. Barry Syahputra; (Celeb-gram) | 6. Ruri Hendra Sasti; Megastar |
| 11 | 5 April 2021 | Erie Suzan | 6. Farida Meliana; (Songwriter) | 3. Imba Sari; (Rhythm Girl) | 1. Ilham Guniar; (Tenor Guy) | 2. Clara Kharisma; (Melodious Voice) | 5. Mumuk Gomez; (Dynamic Girl) | 4. Louis Mulyono; Harmony King |
| 12 | 12 April 2021 | Rita Sugiarto and Alwiansyah | 4. Ferari Putri Maharani; (Waitress) | 3. Jaden Yang; (Food Lover) | 2. Nanda Ardiansta; (Heartbroken Guy) | 1. Dhea Chocolate; (Spoiled Rocker) | 5. Januardi Harefa; (Arjuna's Playboy) | 6. Trisno Jaya Wisyena; Famous Host |

=== Panelists ===
| Legend: |
Regular panelist
Guest panelist

| Apps | | Panelists in attendance (Sorted by first appearance, with episode designations) |
| g# | p# | Panelists in attendance (Sorted by first appearance, with episode designations) |
|---|---|---|
| 12 | 1 | Okky Lukman (1–12) |
| 11 | 1 | Ivan Gunawan (1–6, 8–12) |
| 10 | 1 | Vega Darwanti (1, 3–8, 10–12) |
| 9 | 1 | Wendy Armoko (4–12) |
| 5 | 1 | Chika Jessica (2, 4, 7–8, 11) |
| 4 | 3 | Abdul Wahid (2–3, 10, 12); Alifa Lubis (3–4, 7, 9); Rangga (Smash) (4, 6–8) |
| 3 | 2 | Lee Jeong-hoon (Note: Panelists' note: Foreign attendee: Lee Jeong-hoon (ROK)) (1–2, 12); Ziva Magnolya (6, 8, 11) |
| 2 | 4 | Happy Asmara (1–2); Ruben Onsu (2–3); Danang Dieva (5–6); Aiman Memet (6, 9) |
| 1 | 12 | Lebby Wilayati and Marvin Teguh (1); Betrand Peto Putra Onsu (3); Gita Febiliyasni and Nita Thalia (5); Ratu Jelita and Sarwendah Tan (9); Evi Masamba, Papinka, and Ghea Youbi (10); Jaja Mihardja (11); Selfi Nafilah (12) |
