= I Can See Your Voice Malaysia (Malay language) season 1 =

Television game show season

I Can See Your Voice Malaysia
- Season 1
- Starring: Mark Adam; Jihan Muse; Seelan Paul
- Hosted by: Alvin Chong; Shuk Sahar
- Winners: Good singers: 7; Bad singers: 6
- No. of episodes: Regular: 13; Special: 1; Overall: 14

Release
- Original network: NTV7
- Original release: 4 August – 3 November 2018

Season chronology
- Next → Season 2 (on TV3)

The first season of the Malaysian Malay-language television mystery music game show I Can See Your Voice Malaysia premiered on NTV7 on 4 August 2018.

== Gameplay ==
=== Format ===
According to the original South Korean rules, the guest artist(s) must attempt to eliminate bad singers during its game phase. At the final performance, the last remaining mystery singer is revealed as either good or bad by means of a duet between them and one of the guest artists.

If the last remaining mystery singer is good, they will have to perform again at the encore concert; if a singer is bad, they win RM3,000.

=== Rounds ===
1. Visual round
  The guest artist is given some time to observe and examine each mystery singer based on their appearance. Afterward, a muted video of each mystery singer that reveals only 0.3 seconds of their singing voice is played as an additional hint.
2. Lip sync round
  Each mystery singer performs a lip sync to a song; good singers mime to a recording of their own, while bad singers mime to a backing track by another vocalist.
3. Rehearsal round
  Three random panelists are wearing headphones to listen to a recording of assigned mystery singer that lasts for 15 seconds. Afterward, the panelist defends the mystery singer and convince the guest artist to choose them for a final performance.

== Episodes ==
=== Guest artists ===
| Legend: |
Good singer
Bad singer

| Episode | | Guest artist (Note: Players' notes: For the returning guest artists (who also include foreigners and former good singers), names are displayed in italics.; For the mixed groups, names who identified as bad singers are displayed in italics.) | Mystery singers (In their respective numbers and aliases) | | | | | |
| # | Date | Guest artist | Elimination order | | | | | Winner |
| # | Date | Guest artist | Visual round | Lip sync round | | Rehearsal round | | Winner |
|---|---|---|---|---|---|---|---|---|
| 1 | 4 August 2018 | Cakra Khan (Note: Season highlights: Cakra Khan (IDN; ep. 1) also returned on his 2nd game as a foreigner, when he last played for the Indonesian 1st season.; Ungu designated as a group, in which different members playing on subsequent games are actually returned; Enda and Arlonsy returned on their 2nd game as locals, when they last played for the Indonesian 4th season.) | 5. Rafidah Ramdzi; (As Hard as Pot Collector) | 4. Dzulkiffli Jalil; (Deep Voice Sensation) | 2. Nurfarah Zainudin; (Instagirlicious) | 3. Syamsul Nordin; (Kitchen Hot Man) | 1. Farahida Dolhadi; (Give Me a Like!) | 6. Ahmad Fuad Mohd Raof; Heart Thief |
| 2 | 11 August 2018 | Ayda Jebat | 6. Hamisah Sha'ari; (One More, Two More) | 1. Asyiqin Khairudin; (Depression Fighter) | 5. Nabilah Nasrudin; (Most Beautiful Flower) | 4. Fatin Binti Che Rani; (I'm a Main Character) | 2. Ahmad Irfan Rashid; (Burger Prince) | 3. Badruzzaman Abdul Ghani; Bruno Mars Junior |
| 3 | 18 August 2018 | De Fam | 3. Rahman Tahir; (Exploration Legs) | 5. Puteri Asmah; (No. 2: My Shila's Ideals) | 2. Ahmad Kamil Jalaluddin; (Your Smile is a Smile) | 6. Nurizzati Abdulaziz; (I Terer IT) | 4. Najimi Hakimie Ramli; (What a Despair!) | 1. Nur Khalaf Bin Zulkafli; Dancing Queen |
| 4 | 25 August 2018 | Wany Hasrita | 4. Amirul Izwan Arshad; (Cricket, Not Crickets) | 3. Suzana Akhiyar; (Shake, Shake, Shake) | 5. Ezzat Yunus; (Hardworking Dad) | 1. Lyanna Abdul Talib; (Hearing Fixer) | 6. Harith Aizat; (Peaceful Fisherman) | 2. Amirul Alias; Nordiana, My Dream |
| 5 | 1 September 2018 | Faizal Tahir | 1. Umi Najwa Ghani; (I'm Not Just a Model) | 3. Syazwan Kamuradin; (Goldfish Eyes) | 6. Aidil Hafizi Fadzil; (Flying Fish) | 5. Ethan Tay Rong Hui; (Prince of Tennis) | 2. Muhiri Siwas; (Heir to the Beautiful Voice) | 4. Amiera Ismail; Cheer Up Baby |
| 6 | 8 September 2018 | Misha Omar | 6. Fahmi Haswan; (Tauke Runcit Loves to Sing) | 1. Aina Mahyuddin; (Caffeine Explorer) | 2. Shalieza Hashim; (Go Go Smasher) | 3. Alyssa Rosli; (Goal Shooter) | 4. Norfaizatuainda Yunos; (Hidden Pearl) | 5. Afifi Zakaria; 10 Pin Striker |
| 7 | 15 September 2018 | Hazama Azmi | 1. Razif Osman; (Memory Snapper) | 2. Siti Salim; (K-pop Hypnotised) | 3. Khairunnisa Yusoff; (My Son of the World) | 5. Izuranie Abdul Mudar; (Nature's Beautiful Embrace) | 4. Hafiz Abdulaziz; (Lizard Man) | 6. Janice Low; Beauty Cutie |
| 8 | 22 September 2018 | Kaka Azraff | 5. Ridzuan Zin; (Transform, Exchange) | 1. Shakir Sarif; (Digital Da Vinci) | 3. Nadia Mustafa; (Tip Top Conqueror) | 4. Syafiqah Nornizam; (Effect Visualizer) | 6. Nareena Roslee; (Po-po-Poker Face) | 2. Syafiqah Hamzi; 4 Octaver |
| 9 | 29 September 2018 | Black Hanifah | 5. Masturah Azhar; (Human Photoshopper) | 6. Azrulfizan Ibrahim; (I'm a Good Role Model) | 3. Hakim Rizal and Fakrullah Rajab; (1+1=2) | 2. Nabilah Zafri; (Fashion Lover) | 4. Alif Kadim; (The Merchandiser) | 1. Hafizi Mustaffa; Magical Hands |
| 10 | 6 October 2018 | Ziana Zain | 3. Atiqah Noor; (Fashion Encyclopedia) | 2. Akif Danial Radzman; (Mama Says my Voice is Good) | 1. Sofri Yusof; (No More Starla's Letter) | 6. Ameyra Zakdi; (Fingers Dancing on a Rope) | 5. Farra Safwan; (Acting, O.K.! Singing Again, O.K.!) | 4. Fitriyani Sulaiman; Oh My Family |
| 11 | 13 October 2018 | Dayang Nurfaizah | 5. Raihan Abdullah; (Muay Thai, Eye of the Basket) | 1. Hisham Malek; (The Choir Follows my Rhythm) | 3. Faiq Lutif Salimi Zaid; (I Believe I Can Fly) | 2. Putri Farah Man; (Grade A Genius) | 4. Dini Dayana Mansor; (Dini Not Tiny) | 6. Sharifah Zahar; Kick it Girl |
| 12 | 20 October 2018 | Altimet | 4. Shazrena Zainudin; (Face Painter) | 2. Falezal Mahazir; (Delicious Doctor) | 6. Hazrol Roslan; (Beater Pan) | 3. Nurakmal Ayub; (Band Brother) | 5. Nasuha Yushafizan; (Happiness Perfectionist) | 1. Luqman Peter Lisut; Weaving Rhythm |
| 13 | 27 October 2018 | Pasha (Ungu) | 4. Dean Aiman Malik; (Singing is Beautiful as the Writing) | 5. Nisha Haque Reza; (I Wanna be Famous!) | 1. Huzaimir Zainuddin; (Monica's Harmony) | 6. Samsul Odari; (Friendly Coy) | 3. Hafeez Majid; (Tauke Popia's Son) | 2. Pua Shen Thong; I'm a Superstar |

=== Panelists ===
| Legend: |
Regular panelist
Guest panelist

| Apps | | Panelists in attendance (Sorted by first appearance, with episode designations) |
| g# | p# | Panelists in attendance (Sorted by first appearance, with episode designations) |
|---|---|---|
| 13 | 2 | Mark Adam and Jihan Muse (1–13) |
| 10 | 1 | Seelan Paul (2–3, 6–13) |
| 3 | 1 | Hafiz Hatim (1, 4–5) |
| 1 | 26 | Nazrudin Rahman and Haqiem Rusli (1); Jaja Iliyes and Syazuwan Hassan (2); Ammar Alfian and Fikry Ibrahim (3); Zairul Husin and Saharul Ridzwan (4); Haiza Nordin and Dennis Yin (5); Josiah Hogan and Siti Sarah (6); Aishah Azman and Mat Dan (7); Tajul Ariff and Aiman Tino (8); Izzue Islam and Nonny Nadirah (9); Aizat Amdan and Ain Edruce (10); Marsha Milan and Issey Titan (11); Hannah Delisha (Note: Panelists' note: Foreign attendee: Hannah Delisha (SGP)) and Hafeez Mikail (12); Chazynash and Azrel Ismail (13) |

== Encore Concert (3 November 2018) ==
Also in this season, a first encore concert was held one week after its final game, featuring some of invited mystery singers return to perform one last time; Ernie Zakri and Indonesian singer Virgoun made their guesting appearances.

I Can See Your Voice Malaysia season 1 — Encore Concert performances
| Performer(s) | Song(s) |
|---|---|
Medley
| Afifi Zakaria | Chasing Pavements" — Adele |
| Ahmad Fuad Mohd Raof | "Once You're Gone" (Setelah Kau Tiada) — Cakra Khan |
| Hafizi Mustaffa | "When We Were Young" — Adele |
| Luqman Peter Lisut | "Amboi" — Altimet |
| Sharifah Zahar | "Forever" (Selamanya) — Ungu |
| Badruzzaman Abdul Ghani | "Him" (Dia) — Anji |
| Amirul Alias | "Weak" (Rapuh) — Nastia |
| All winners | "This Is Me" — Keala Settle and The Greatest Showman ensemble |
Duet performances
| Hafizi Mustaffa and Afifi Zakaria | "Spell" (Jampi) — Hael Husaini |
| Sharifah Zahar and Luqman Peter Lisut | "If I Ain't Got You" — Alicia Keys |
| Ernie Zakri and Hafizi Mustaffa | "I Love" (Aku Cinta) — Syamel feat. Ernie Zakri |
| Ernie Zakri and Virgoun | "Testimony" (Bukti) — Virgoun; "Don't be Angry" (Jangan Marah) — Ernie Zakri |
| Virgoun and Sharifah Zahar | "Love Letter to Starla" (Surat Cinta Untuk Starla) — Virgoun |
