= Fakhrul Razi =

Bruneian singer

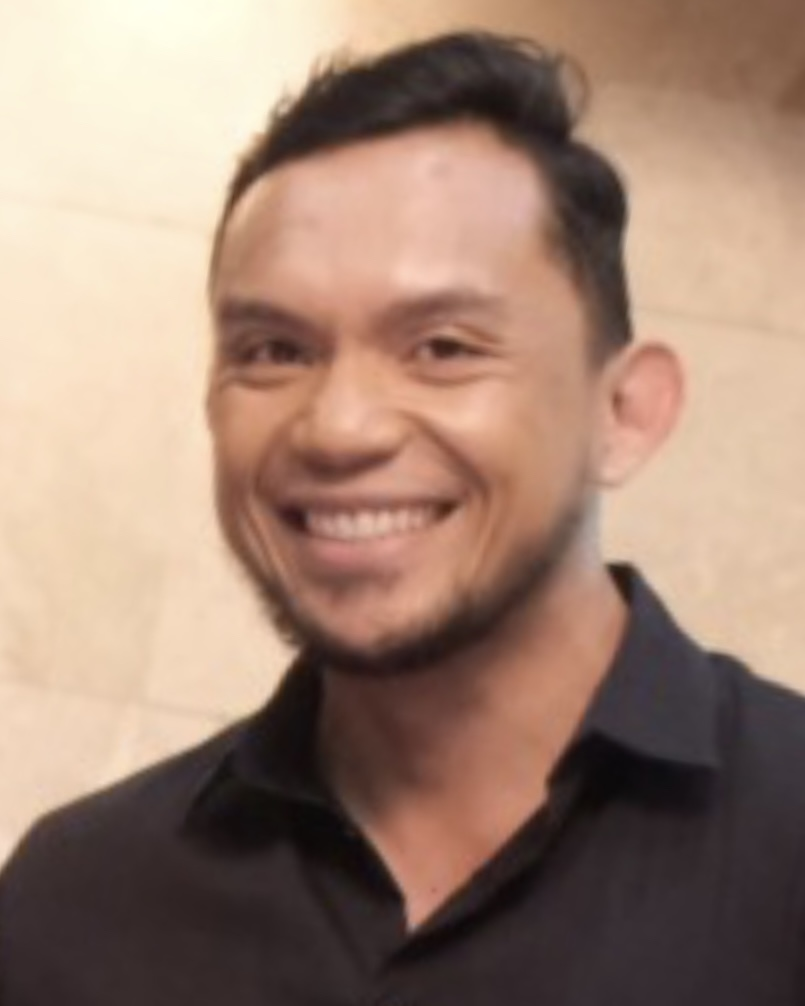
- Fakhrul in 2020
- Born: 13 April 1980 (age 45); Bandar Seri Begawan, Brunei
- Education: Paduka Seri Begawan Sultan Science College; Universiti Brunei Darussalam
- Occupation: Singer
- Years active: 2004–present
- Musical career
- Genres: R&B; pop
- Instrument: Vocals

Muhammad Fakhrul Razi bin Ibrahim (born 13 April 1980) or commonly known by his stage name Fakhrul Razi, is a singer-songwriter from Brunei who has previously hosted the D'Academy Asia which airs on Indosiar. Pop, R&B, and indigenous Bruneian music are all combined in his songs, and he has grown a following both domestically and internationally.

== Career ==
Fakhrul first clung to a microphone during a kindergarten class and was invited to sing in front of an audience when he was five years old. He was unsure, but certainly enjoyed being on stage. His friends encouraged him to participate in the Radio Televisyen Brunei (RTB)'s Talent Time singing competition when he was 24 years old, in which he won first place in 2004.

At that point, he begin to gain notoriety and participated in Senandung Muhibbah, a joint musical showcase series between Brunei and Malaysia. He began profiting from his performance at events and taking singing seriously when he received his first payday of B$50 for performing six songs. From 2004 to 2013, he presented radio shows on Bruneian television, in addition to working with RTB's radio station Nasional FM for the first five years. He won an Avima Award for Best R&B Vocals in 2010, which was his largest victory abroad.

At the inaugural Asia Music Festival (AMF) at Eastwood Valley Golf & Country Club in Miri, Fakhrul gave a performance in October 2013. In Hollywood, California earlier that year, he was the only representative of Brunei to advance to the World Championships of Performing Arts (WCOPA) finals. At WCOPA in Hollywood, he earned gold medals in three categories: R&B/Jazz, Original Works, and Open Vocal (Male). Additionally, he received two silver medals in the Pop and Broadway categories.

"Senyuman Gelapmu," a song from Fakhrul's 2014 debut album Mutlak, is about to become a great hit in Kuala Lumpur. "I wrote all of the relevant lyrics for the song Senyuman Gelapmu. It illustrates how people are not always who they seem to be; this holds true for aloof individuals who are actually kind, and vice versa," according to him. Additionally, he received nominations for the song from Anugerah Bintang Popular Berita Harian 2014 in the category of Popular New Male Artiste and Anugerah Industri Muzik 21 (AIM21) in the category of Best New Male Artiste.

As of 2015, nine songs make up his Mutlak album, three of which are written and composed by Fakhrul. The two other tracks are "Salahkah Aku" and the title track "Mutlak." The late Adam Ahmad and distinguished composer Azlan Abu Hassan were both engaged in the album's development. He received an invitation to represent Brunei in the 2nd ASEAN-Japan Music Festival, which takes place in Tokyo, Japan on the 4 October 2018. A farewell ceremony for him was held at the Japanese Embassy in Brunei earlier on 27 September, hosted by the Japanese ambassador.

Additionally in 2018, he was among the guest penalist for Indonesia's I Can See Your Voice Indonesia (season 3). Fakhrul sung the song Keris Sakti from the Upin & Ipin: The Lone Gibbon Kris's OST, in addition to voicing he character, Nakhoda Ragam As a thank you for Fakhrul's commitment to enhancing Brunei-Indonesian cultural relations in 2020, the Indonesian ambassador gave him a plaque. He made his comeback on 13 December 2021, with his most recent single, "Bahagia Tanpa Aku."

== Personal life ==
=== Family ===
Fakhrul was the youngest of five siblings in Bandar Seri Begawan. With the exception of Fakhrul, none of his family members are musically talented. His mother, Hamimah Jumaat, died at the age of 63 in 2011, due to sickness, and he dedicates his Mutlak album to her.

Fakhrul and Rina Nose was arranging their wedding after the proposal, but he abruptly revealed that his relationship had broken down in the midst. Despite this, he congratulated her on her marriage to Josscy Aartsen in the Netherlands on 22 October 2019.

=== Education ===
Fakhrul previously attended Bandar Seri Begawan's Paduka Seri Begawan Sultan Science College and studied history for two years at Universiti Brunei Darussalam.

== Discography ==
Year	Name	Album	Notes
2014	"Senyuman Gelapmu"	Mutlak	
2014	"Cerita Cinta"	Mutlak	
2014	"Andai Terdapat Bahagia"	Mutlak	
2014	"Mutlak"	Mutlak	
2014	"Salahkan Aku"	Mutlak	
2014	"Ku Tak Pernah Sendiri"	Mutlak	
2014	"SHSM"	Mutlak	
2014	"Mutlak (Revisited)"	Mutlak	
2014	"SHSM (Versi Larut Malam)"	Mutlak	
2016	"Ya Iyalah"	Non-album single	
2018	"Tunggu Aku"	Non-album single	
2019	"Keris Sakti"	Non-album single	Used in Upin & Ipin: The Lone Gibbon Kris
2021	"Bahagia Tanpa Aku"	Non-album single	Music composed by EE Studio
