= Manis FM =

Coordinates: 5.3151414°N 103.1231033°E

- Kuala Terengganu; Malaysia
- Broadcast area: Kelantan; Pahang; Terengganu
- Frequency: Varies depending on its region

Programming
- Languages: Malay in the dialects of Kelantan Malay, Pahang Malay and Terengganu Malay as well as standard Malay.
- Format: Contemporary hit radio

Ownership
- Owner: Husa Network Sdn Bhd

History
- First air date: 20 June 1998; 27 years ago

Links
- Webcast: live.manis.fm
- Website: www.manis.fm

Manis FM is a Malay language-radio station operated by Husa Network Sdn Bhd. Its headquarters are located in Kuala Terengganu, Terengganu.

== History ==
Manis FM began its operation on 20 June 1998. In the early years, Manis FM first transmitted to the city of Kota Bharu only. Its original frequency was 88.7 FM and aired for only 18 hours a day. Its headquarters were at first located at Jalan Kebun Sultan in front of the Kelantan state Chinese business hall.

In 2003, Manis FM started broadcasting 24 hours a day after moving to its new headquarters at Wisma Manis. The frequency of Manis FM in Kota Bharu was changed to 90.6 FM. The station also expanded to several states, especially in the east coast states of Terengganu and Pahang. Manis FM also launched a website with a new user interface look. Manis FM can be also tuned in Southern Thailand, Redang Island & Perhentian Islands.

Since 2011, Manis FM is a unit of Husa Network Sdn Bhd. Manis FM subsequently relocated its broadcasting facilities to Kuala Terengganu while its frequencies remained unchanged.

== Notable announcers ==
- Mat Dan (moved to Molek FM)

== Frequency ==
| Frequencies | Area | Transmitter |
|---|---|---|
| 90.6 MHz | Kota Bharu, Kelantan | Tunjong |
| 102.0 MHz | Kuala Terengganu, Terengganu | Bukit Jerung |
| 95.1 MHz | Kuantan, Pahang | Bukit Pelindung |
