= Mat Dan =

English traveller and TV host

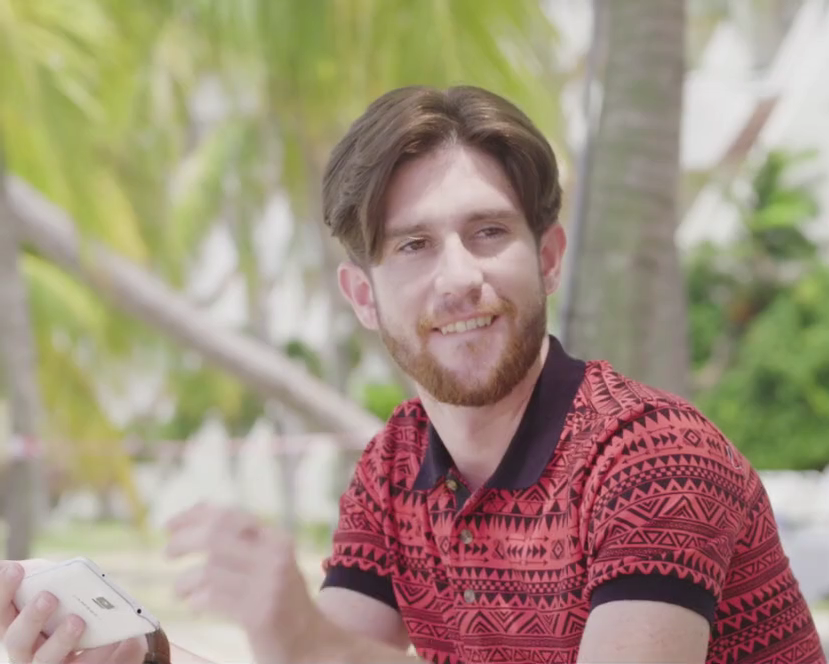
- Mat Dan in 2017
- Born: Daniel James Tyler; 18 October 1989 (age 36); Bristol, England
- Other name: Kareef Daniel Abdullah
- Education: Kapasia Degree College, Dhaka, Bangladesh; Cheltenham Bournside School and Sixth Form Centre, Cheltenham, Gloucestershire
- Occupations: Traveler; Host Television; Actor; Radio Presenter
- Years active: 2016–present
- Employers: Husa Network (2019–21); Media Prima Audio (2021–present)
- Known for: Mastering the Terengganu dialect
- Notable work: Haramain Backpackers - Trans Siberian; Mat Dan Kaki Jalan
- Spouse: Nadifa Adnan (m. 2017)
- Children: 1. Muhammad Zayne; Tyler; 2. Eydan Yusoff; Tyler; 3. Esabelle Zahra; Tyler

Daniel James Tyler (born 18 October 1989 also known by his Muslim name Mohammad Kareef Daniel bin Abdullah) is an English traveller and TV host who has been living in Malaysia since 2009. He first settled in Malaysia after travelling in Kapas Island. He is known for his eloquence in speaking Terengganu dialect. He is also better known through the television show, Haramain Backpackers - Trans Siberian and also hosted Mat Dan Kaki Jalan.

In February 2018, he was officially granted permanent resident status by the then Deputy Prime Minister Datuk Seri Dr Ahmad Zahid Hamidi, who publicly announced his new status at the launch of Expo Terengganu 2018.

== Life ==
=== Early life ===
Daniel James Tyler was born in Bristol, England on 18 October 1989 as the second child of three siblings. His younger brother is Will Tyler, while his older brother is Joe Tyler. He is the son of Kevin, a businessman, and Nicol Tyler, an administrator.

=== Emigrant to Malaysia ===
In 2009, he went on a trip to Thailand and Laos with a friend after completing his A-level. At that time, his friend had suggested that he visit the Perhentian Island. When he got there, he learned about Kapas Island. 10 days after residing on the island, he came to Kapas Island. As long as he was there, he volunteered in a chalet. He returned to Pulau Kapas in 2010 then settled for over 7 years. There he learned the Terengganu dialect. On 26 February 2018 Tyler received the status of Malaysian Permanent Resident (PR) from the then Malaysian Deputy Prime Minister, Dato' Seri Ahmad Zahid Hamidi at the opening of Terengganu Expo 2018 at the compound of the Terengganu Sports Complex.

=== Embracing Islam ===
In January 2013, he converted to Islam with the help from his adopted brother, Zakaria Sulong, and changed his name to Mohammad Kareef Daniel Abdullah.

=== Family ===
He engaged and married Nadifa Adnan, a local Malay girl, on 12 March 2017 at his wife's home in Bukit Chendering, Terengganu.

He has a son born on 5 May 2018 at the Salam Specialist Hospital and was named as Muhammad Zayne Danial James Tyler. On 7 November 2020, Mat Dan blessed with second son born at 10.55 MST at the Sultanah Nur Zahirah Hospital. He named his second son as Eydan Yusoff bin Daniel James Tyler 20 days later.

== Career ==
As of January 2019, he worked as a radio announcer at Manis FM and hosting a food travelogue programme.

=== Ambassador ===
On 22 October 2016, he was appointed as Terengganu State Environmental Ambassador in conjunction with the State Level National State Day at Kerteh by the Malaysian Department of Environment (DOE).

On 4 September 2019 Mat Dan was selected as the Terengganu Tourism Icon by the Terengganu state government. His appointment was made to enable Mat Dan to promote and strengthen Terengganu in overseas markets such as the United Kingdom and Europe. He said, "From the first day I arrived in Malaysia, I have fallen in love with this country". (Note: Original: "sejak hari pertama saya sampai di Malaysia, saya telah jatuh cinta dengan negara ini".)

== Filmography ==
=== Television ===
Year	Title	Role	TV channel	Notes
2016–2017	Haramain Backpackers - Trans Siberian	Host	Astro Oasis	with PU Amin
2016–2017	Mat Dan Kaki Jalan	Host	Astro Prima	
2018	Mahabbah Meals	Host	Astro Gempak	
2018	I Can See Your Voice Malaysia (season 1)	Guest	ntv7	
2022	Borak Kopitiam	Host	TV3	
2023	Misi Mat Dan	Host	TV9	

=== Telemovie ===
Year	Title	Role	TV channel
2018	Matilahnak		Astro Citra
2021	Busker Bercinta	Rejab	TV2

=== Television series ===
Year	Title	Role	TV channel	Notes
2016–2017	Jenaka Kampung Kalut (J.K.K)		TV3	Sitcom

== Radiography ==
=== Radio ===
Year	Title	Station
2019–2021	Manis Manis Pagi	Manis FM
9 January 2022 – present	Molek Petang	Molek FM
