= Joshua Suherman =

Singer and actor

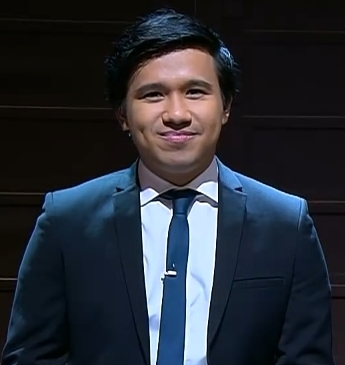
- Suherman in 2018
- Born: 3 November 1992 (age 33); Surabaya, Indonesia
- Citizenship: Indonesian
- Occupations: Singer; actor
- Years active: 1996–present

Joshua Suherman (born 3 November 1992) is an Indonesian singer and actor.

== Early life and career ==
Born in Surabaya, Suherman is the oldest of three siblings. He has been an avid supporter of Liverpool since elementary school. Having loved to sing and been confident at performing in public since childhood, his parents agreed when a music producer wanted to make an album for their son.

Suherman started his career as a child singer in 1996, releasing his first album Cit Cit Cuit with the same title track. His second album, Kapal Terbang, was released in 1997. His 1999 album Air – featuring Tukul Arwana – was released and became a viral sound in the Indonesian entertainment industry.

In 2006, Suherman became member of Saqadaex with Geofanny Tambunan and Natasha Chairani, alongside Indonesian Idol finalist Teza Sumendra. In 2018, he formed a digital-based comedy group called Majelis Lucu Indonesia, joined by fellow comedians Fico Fachriza, Tretan Muslim, Indra Frimawan, Coki Pardede, Adriano Qalbi, and Dustin Tiffani.

== Personal life ==
In January 2018, Suherman was reported to the police on suspicion of committing blasphemy related to comedy material he presented during a stage event.

Suherman and his then-partner, Clairine Clay, formed a duo group called Regunada. On 31 January 2020, they released their first single, "Lagu Pertama". The couple got married on 22 December 2021 and welcomed a son on 22 July 2024.

== Filmography ==
=== Television series ===
Year	Title	Role	Notes
1996—1997	Abad 21	Jojo	
1997	Tuyul & Mbak Yul	Joshua	Episode 67
1998—1999	Air Mata Ibu	Ucok kecil	
1998	Saras 008	Joshua	
1999	Ngelaba	Joshua	
1999—2001	Anak Ajaib	Tommy	
2000—2001	Terpikat	Joshua	
2001—2002	Indra Keenam	Bintang	
2002	Jin dan Jun	Joshua	Episode 111
2004—2005	Arung dan Si Kaya	Arung	
2006	Mutiara Hati 2	Rafi	
2008—2015	Sketsa	Joshua	
2009	Inayah	Tedjo	
2013	Magic	Reza	
2014	Bara Bere	Jaja	
2014	Jagoan Jagoan Katropolitan	Joko	
2014—2015	Comic Story	Joshua	
