= Rafael Landry Tanubrata =

Rafael Tan
- Born: Rafael Landry Tanubrata; November 16, 1986 (age 39); Garut, West Java, Indonesia
- Occupations: Celebrity, businessperson, dancer, singer
- Musical career
- Genres: Pop, urban, R&B, dance, soul
- Labels: Star Signal, Sony Music
- Member of: Smash

Rafael Tan (born 16 November 1986 in Garut, West Java, Indonesia) is an Indonesian singer-songwriter, dancer, businessperson and actor. He is a member of the boy band SM*SH.

== Filmography ==
=== Television drama ===
Year	Title	Role
2011	Cinta Cenat Cenut	Rafael
2012	Cinta Cenat Cenut 2	Rafael
2013	Cinta Cenat Cenut 3	

== TV shows ==
- Inbox (2014)
- JKT48 Finding a Star (season 1, 2015)

== Discography ==
=== Before joining SM*SH ===
- Vocalist (2003) (before joining SM*SH)

=== Singles ===
- Tiada Kata Berpisah (There is no word Split) (2015)

=== As SM*SH member ===
==== Albums ====
- SM*SH (2011) as a member SM*SH
- Step Forward (2012) as a member SM*SH

==== Singles ====
- I Heart You (2010)
- Senyum Semangat (2011)
- Ada Cinta (2011)
- Akhiri Saja (2011)
- Selalu Bersama (2011)
- Ahh (2011)
- Cinta Kau Dan Dia (2011)
- Gadisku (2011)
- Pahat Hati (2012)
- Rindu Ini (2013)
- Selalu Tentang Kamu (2013)
