= Upiak Isil =

Indonesian singer

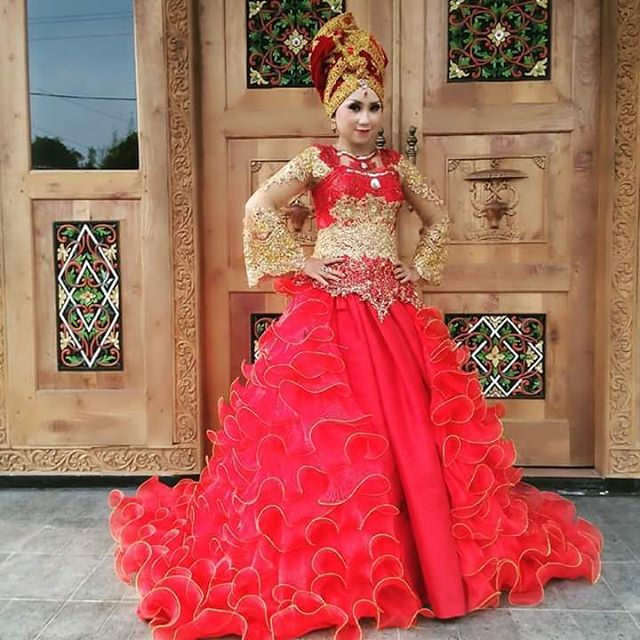
- Born: 24 December 1986 (age 39); Bukittinggi, West Sumatra, Indonesia
- Other names: Silvia Nanda
- Occupations: Singer, actress, comedian
- Years active: 1999–present
- Musical career
- Genres: Pop; Dance; Ethnic pop
- Instrument: Vocals
- Label: Elta Record

Silvia Nanda or her stage name Upiak Isil (born 24 December 1986) is a famous Indonesian singer, actress and female comedian. She populared from her single and MV Tak Tun Tuang, uploaded and released on social media in 2017 and populared around the Southeast Asia, especially Thailand and Malaysia.

She was born in Bukittinggi, West Sumatra on 24 December 1986 into a Minangkabau family, after that her family move to Pariaman, West Sumatra. She started to her career for 13 years old by populared artist in her ethnic. She very populared in her national by Minangkabau language pop singer.

In 2017, her music video Tak Tun Tuang make her on fame and populared around Southeast Asia. Tak Tun Tuang's lyrics is from her lifestyle that look crazy and dirty but she ignored every cruise, because she has happy with her lifestyle. Tak Tung Tuang is so very popular in 3 years later that many singers have been covered it again, include Wonderframe (Thai singer), Aryanna Alyssa Dezek (Malaysian singer).

== Discography ==
=== Studio Album ===
- Malas Dedek Mah (Full Album)
- Harok Jo Padi Salibu
- Album Lawak Basilemak 3 Diva
- Emang Uda Sia (Full Album)
- Amris Arifin & Isil - Bahagia Bukan Harato (Album)
- Pudurkan Saja (Full Album)
- Upiak Isil - Kutang Barendo (Full Album)

=== Single ===
- Tak Tun Tuang
- Kamera Palsu
- Halah Halahai
- Ketika Mantan Kayak Setan

== Filmbiography ==
=== Film ===
Year	Title	Role	Produced by
2018	Liam Dan Laila	Tek Rosma	Mahakarya Pictures; Malin Films
2018	Mama Mama Jagoan	Upiak Isil	Buddy Buddy Pictures; Bert Pictures
2021	Begadang Rendang	Amak Afifah	PIM Pictures
