= Ghea Indrawari =

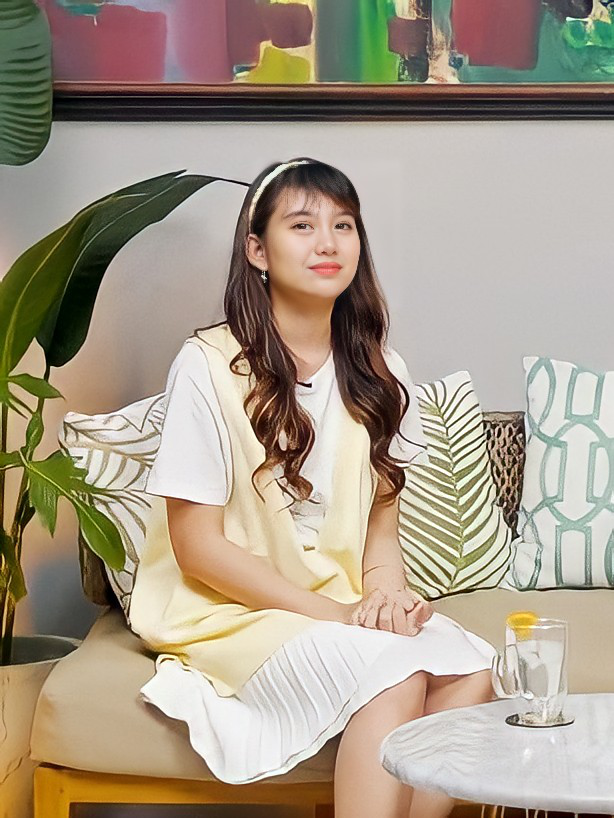
- Ghea in 2021
- Born: March 10, 1998 (age 28); Singkawang, West Kalimantan, Indonesia
- Education: Yogyakarta State University
- Occupations: Singer-songwriter; actress; host
- Years active: 2016—present
- Musical career
- Genre: Pop
- Instrument: Vocals
- Label: Hits Records

Ghea Indrawari (born 10 March 1998) is an Indonesian singer-songwriter, actress and host.

She rose to prominence after participated in the ninth season of Indonesian Idol in 2018 where she is a fifth runner-up. She signed with Hits Records and released her debut single "Rinduku" on 31 August 2018. In 2023, she got her breakthrough with "Jiwa Yang Bersedih" which managed to top the weekly Indonesian Songs chart compiled by Billboard for 8 consecutive weeks.

== Personal life ==
Ghea was born on 10 March 1998 in Singkawang, West Kalimantan. She is the eldest of two siblings, having a younger brother. Her parents divorced since she was young and lived with her mother and brother.

Ghea studied at Pertiwi Elementary School, Pontianak City, SMP Negeri 3, Singkawang City, SMA Negeri 3, Singkawang, and studied Music Arts Education at the Yogyakarta State University.

== Discography ==
=== Compilation albums ===
Title	Album details	Ref.
Musikini Super Hits	Released: 27 August 2019; Label: Jagonya Musik & Sport Indonesia; Format: CD	
Journey of Love	Released: 25 February 2022; Label: Hits Records; Format: Digital download	

=== Studio albums ===
Title	Album details	Ref.
Berdamai	Released: 10 March 2024; Label: Hits Records; Format: Digital download	
