= Bisma Karisma =

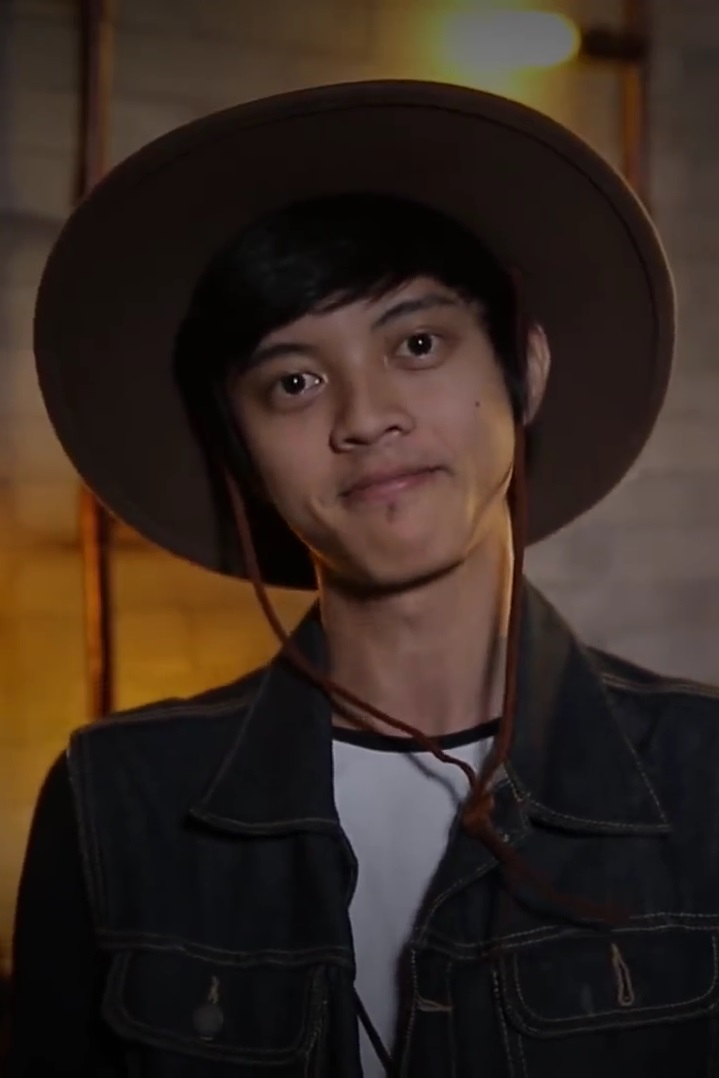

Background information
- Born: 27 November 1990 (age 35); Bandung, West Java, Indonesia
- Genres: Pop, New Wave, psychedelic pop
- Occupations: Singer, actor
- Years active: 2010–present
- Label: indie

Bisma Karisma (born 27 November 1990 in Padang) is a member of the boy band SM*SH, with Minangkabau descent. Before joining the band, he was a national Bboy and also a drummer, percussionist and vocalist. He has released two albums with SM*SH. Their first album was awarded Platinum for having sold more than one million copies within six months.

In mid-2014, Bisma began his solo career with the first single "#LAKUKANLAH", for which he wrote the music and lyrics. He also appeared in the television soap opera Cinta Cenat Cenut, along with his bandmates. In 2016, he became the co-producer, original soundtrack writer and singer, as well as appearing in the main cast of JUARA.

== Early life ==
Bisma was born in Padang, West Sumatra. He has an older sister Mega Puspita Sari, a pharmacist. When he was ten, he won first prize in the Dance Revolution Competition. At the age of eleven, he joined DAWN SQUAD, a breakdance team from Bandung. He was given the MURI Achievement as the longest head spinner.

== Acting career ==
Bisma worked along with MagMA Entertainment to produce a drama-action movie titled JUARA (Champion). He was the co-producer, original soundtrack singer-songwriter, and part of the main cast. He won awards for his role.

== Works ==
=== Soap operas ===
- Cinta Cenat Cenut (2011) as Bisma
- Cinta Cenat Cenut 2 (2011) as Bisma
- Cinta Cenat Cenut 3 (2012) as Bisma
- ABG Jadi Manten (2014) as Bisma

=== Film ===
- Juara (2016) as Bisma
- Kadet 1947 (2021) as Sutardjo Sigit
