= Ria Ricis =

Indonesian actress and YouTuber (born 1995)

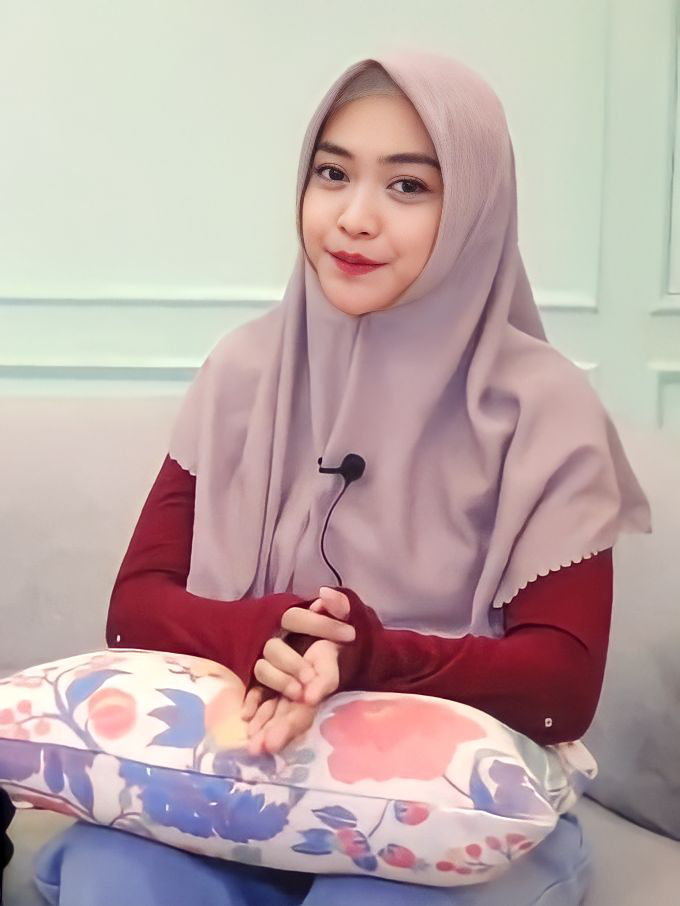
- Ricis in 2020
- Born: Ria Yunita; July 1, 1995 (age 31); Batam, Kepulauan Riau, Indonesia
- Other name: Ria Ricis
- Education: Universitas Pancasila
- Occupations: Internet personality; YouTuber; actress; presenter; producer; writer; singer
- Years active: 2013—present
- Spouse: Teuku Ryan (m. 2021; div. 2024)
- Children: 1
- Family: Oki Setiana Dewi (Older sister)

YouTube information
- Views: 10.23 billion

YouTube information
- Channel: Ricis Official
- Genres: Blog video; komedi; hiburan
- Subscribers: 45 million
- Views: 7,6 billion
- Last updated: 7 May 2024

Ria Yunita, better known as Ria Ricis (born July 1, 1995), is an Indonesian internet celebrity, YouTuber, actress, presenter, producer, writer, and singer. She is the first female YouTube personality with the most subscribers in Southeast Asia.

In October 2022, Ricis's main YouTube channel, Ricis Official, was hacked. (Note: The exact date of the Ricis Official YouTube channel's hacking is unknown. Some sources say it occurred on October 21, 2022, while others say it occurred on October 22, 2022.) It was restored on October 27, 2022.

== Early life and education ==
Ricis was born on July 1, 1995, in Batam, Riau Islands, Indonesia. She grew up there with her two older sisters, Oki Setiana Dewi and Shindy Kurnia Putri Sastromartodjo. Ricis attended school in Batam and won awards in competitions involving the arts, such as dancing and singing.

She obtained a bachelor's degree in Communication Studies from Pancasila University.
