= SM*SH (album) =

Studio album by SM*SH
- Released: June 26, 2011
- Recorded: 2010–2011
- Genre: Dance-pop, K-pop, hip hop
- Length: 39:08
- Label: Star Signal; Ancora Music; Nagaswara
- Producer: Star Signal, Veronica Lukito, Lidi Management, Bens Leo

SM*SH chronology
SM*SH (2011)	Step Forward (2012)

Singles from SM*SH
- 1. "I Heart You" Released: September 2010; 2. "Senyum Semangat" Released: 6 March 2011; 3. "Ada Cinta" Released: September 2011; 4. "Ahh" Released: December 2011

SM*SH is the first studio album by the Indonesian boy band, SM*SH, released in Jakarta on June 26, 2011. The album contains pop-dance music produced by Star Signal, Veronica Lukitoand Lidi Management. It was released by Ancora Music and Star Signal.

The album sold over 1 million copies within six months in Indonesia.

== Background and songs ==
The band had already released the main single, "I Heart You" and followed with "Senyum Semangat" as the second single. The album contains ten songs that carry the flow of dance-pop and Indo pop. "I Heart You" appears in two versions, an original and an acoustic version. There are four cover versions: "Ada Cinta" (Bening), "Gadisku" (Trio Libels), "Inikah Cinta" (M.E) and "Oh Ya" (Kelompok 3 Suara).

== Track listing ==
No.	Title	Writer(s)	Length
1.	"I Heart You"	Bunny d'Looney, Decil Prapanca, Sogi Indradhuaja	3:31
2.	"Senyum Semangat"	D'Looney, Prapanca, Kimberly Chin	3:04
3.	"Akhiri Saja"	Audi Mok, Omar K, Chin, Warner Chappel, Valiant Budi Vabyo	4:26
4.	"Gadisku"	Kendi Kamandanu, Herry Alesis, Bowo Soulmate	5:06
5.	"Selalu Bersama"	Francis Cobb, Vabyo	4:25
6.	"Ahh"	Omar K, Vabyo, Audi Mok, Alesis	3:22
7.	"Oh Ya"	Dian Pramana Poetra, Deddy Dhukun, J. Flow, Irwan S	3:36
8.	"Inikah Cinta"	Denny Saba, Yoyok-Inal, Soulmate, Alesi	4:03
9.	"Ada Cinta"	Yovie Widianto, Irwan Simanjuntak, Eko	3:57
10.	"I Heart You (Acoustic Version)"	Cobb, Jamie Wilson, Noisy Bunch, Alesi	3:39

Adapted from:
