= Smash (Indonesian band) =

Indonesian boy band

SM*SH
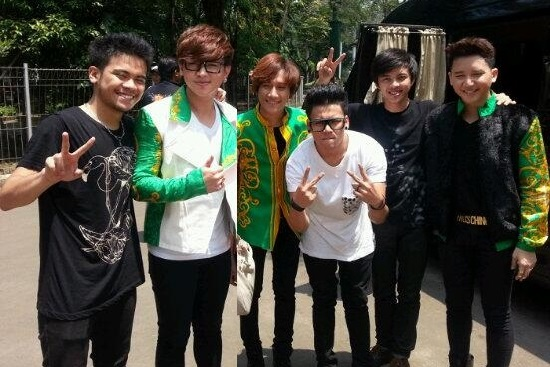
- SM*SH in 2013

Background information
- Origin: Bandung, Indonesia
- Genres: Pop, dance-pop, Indo pop, I-pop
- Years active: 2010–present
- Labels: StarSignal (2010-2011); Ancora Music (2011-2014); Virgo Ramayana/Omega Pacific (Re-issues); 401 Music (2018-present)
- Members: Rafael; Bisma; Dicky; Reza; Ilham
- Past members: Morgan; Rangga
- Website: www.smashblast.co.id

SM*SH or 7 Man as 7 Heroes, (Indonesian pronunciation: [smɛs] or English: /ˈsmæʃ/), is a boy band from Indonesia, founded by Star signal on April 10, 2010. This boyband consists of Rafael, Rangga, Morgan, Bisma, Dicky, Reza, & Ilham. Together, they perform songs that are pop dance oriented. The name SM*SH stands for you heroes, meaning that they want to inspire young people by bringing positive spirits through their song. The letter "A" that is replaced by the star symbol was inspired by the name of their management, Star Signal. Currently, SM*SH is also working under the "Ancora Music" label since the mid 2011. Their first studio album, which was released worldwide, is titled SM*SH (self titled). Their well known singles, include "I Heart You", "Senyum Semangat", and "Ada Cinta". SM*SH has changed the Indonesian music industry by popularizing the boyband culture in 2011. Now, the Indonesian music industry is dominated by various boy bands and girl bands. Up until recently, SM*SH had received 8 awards and 2 nominations in 2011, including 2 awards from the Indonesia Kids Choice Awards 2011.

== Career ==
=== 2010: Early form ===
Star signal included them in a 5-month training camp, where they sharpened their singing, dancing, & public speaking ability. Early in their career, SM*SH also took part in the dancing competition held by Cinta Laura, & become the background dancers in Laura's single. Later in September 2010, they released their debut single, titled "I Heart You". The song was then rearranged by the artists, & changed into "Cenat Cenut". Both of the 2 songs are controversial due to their energetic video clips

=== 2011: SM*SH and Cinta Cenat Cenut ===
Cinta Cenat Cenut is the 1st television series, starring the members of the SM*SH alone, & they became the main characters in this series. The show is aired on Trans TV since February 18, 2011. In this series, SM*SH acted with other Indonesian artists, such as Natasha Rizki & Zaneta Georgina. Because of this, they started getting advertising contracts from Telkomsel, & they also became the face of 'Sosis So Nice' advertisements. On April 10, 2011, they celebrated their 1st anniversary in "Hip Hip Hura Tolak Angin Karnaval SCTV 2011", which took place in the field Lumintang Denpasar, Bali. Despite the unfortunate weather conditions, the fans of SM*SH, "(Sm*sh blast)", remained ecstatically shouting & singing along. On March 6, 2011, SM*SH released a 2nd single, entitled "Senyum Semangat". Their 1st live performance of this eurodance song was aired by "Inbox" SCTV. Consequently, this song reached the top of the charts in Indonesia.

In the event of the Indonesian music awards, "SCTV Music Awards 2011", SM*SH was invited to read the nomination for "New Arrivals Album Duo Group". They also performed their single, "I Heart You", with another well-known Indonesian singer, Afgan. Apart from that, they also sang "Senyum Semangat". At the launch of their official website, (Sm*sh blast) www.smash blast.co.id, they said that they're in the process of writing new songs & recording their up coming album. On June 26, 2011, SM*SH released his 1st studio album, titled SM*SH named as its own name or so called self titled. The album contains 10 songs, including 4 recycled songs. SM*SH debut album was also sold in Indonesian outlets of KFC.

In October 2011, SM*SH released their debut album in Malaysia & Singapore to achieve success abroad, especially in Southeast Asia. On October 30, 2011, SM*SH held a mini concert, titled "SM*SH Untukmu Indonesia". The concert was held at the Arena Sports Mall Kelapa Gading, North Jakarta. After the success of their TV series, they're coming back for a second season, Cinta Cenat Cenut 2. The 2nd season began airing on Trans TV on December 3, at 8.30 pm.

In 2012, SM*SH was planning on going worldwide with their music.

=== 2013: Morgan leaving SM*SH and won Mnet Asian Music Awards ===
Morgan announced he was leaving SM*SH in October, & he moved to be an actor for the soap opera Surat Kecil Untuk Tuhan, the series with Nikita Willy. On November 22, they won Mnet Asian Music Awards as the Best Asian Artist in Indonesia region.

=== 2018: Comeback ===
After a hiatus of 5 years, SM*SH decided to make a comeback with a new single titled "Fenomena" under the label "401 Music" on July 18, 2018.

== Members ==
Current

- Rafael Landry Tanubrata (2010-present)
- Bisma Karisma (2010-present)
- Dicky Muhammad Prasetya (2010-present)
- Muhammad Reza Anugrah (2010-present)
- Muhammad Ilham Fauzi Effendi (2010-present)

Former

- Handi Morgan Winata (2010-2013)
- Rangga Dewamoela (2010-2020)

== Discography ==
Studio album

- SM*SH (2011)
- Step Forward (2012)

Single

Title	Year	Peak chart position								Album
Title	Year	BA	BDG	BJ	JKT	KL	SBY	MDN	MKS	Album
"I Heart You"	2010	1	1	1	1	1	1	1	1	SM*SH
"Senyum Semangat"	2011	1	3	3	1	1	1	1	1	SM*SH
"Ada Cinta"	2011	1	—	—	—	2	1	1	—	SM*SH
"Pahat Hati"	2012	—	—	—	—	1	—	—	—	Step Forward
"Rindu Ini"	2013	—	—	—	—	1	—	—	—	Step Forward
"Selalu Tentang Kamu"	2013	—	—	—	—	1	—	—	—	Step Forward
"Fenomena"	2018	—	—	—	—	—	—	—	—	TBA
"Berhenti Berharap"	2018	—	—	—	—	—	—	—	—	TBA
"Jadi Milikku (Feat. Oom Leo)"	2020	—	—	—	—	—	—	—	—	TBA

Music video

Year	Single	Director
2010	"I Heart You"	Dean Medi
2011	"Senyum Semangat"	Dean Medi
2011	"Ada Cinta"	Upie Guava
2012	"Pahat Hati"	Archie Hekagery
2013	"Rindu Ini"	Sakti Marendra
2013	"Selalu Tentang Kamu"	Rizky Lubis

== Filmography ==
Year	Title	Episode	Production
2011	Cinta Cenat Cenut	13	"Transinema Pictures" (TransTV)
2011	SM*SH Ngabuburit	28	SCTV
2011	Cinta Cenat Cenut 2	13	"Transinema Pictures" (TransTV)
2012	Cinta Cenat Cenut 3	11	"Transcinema Pictures" (TransTV)
