= Iis Dahlia =

Indonesian singer and actress

- Born: Iis Laeliyah; 29 May 1972 (age 53); Indramayu, West Java, Indonesia
- Occupations: Singer; actress
- Years active: 1987–present
- Spouses: Dadang Indradjaja (m. 1993; div. 1998); Satrio Dewandono (m. 2001)
- Children: Salshadilla Juwita; Devano Danendra
- Parent(s): Makmuri; Qomariyah
- Musical career
- Genres: Dangdut
- Instrument: Vocal
- Labels: HP Record; Musica Studios; Maheswara Musik Records; Akurama Records

Iis Dahlia (born Iis Laeliyah on 29 May 1972) is an Indonesian singer and actress. She rose to fame after the release of her 1990 dangdut album Tamu Tak Diundang (Uninvited Guests). She is best known for her songs "Cinta Bukanlah Kapal" (Love is Not a Ship), "Payung Hitam" (Black Umbrella) and "Ser".

== Early life and career ==
Dahlia began singing onstage in elementary school. She studied voice at HAPMI (The Association of Indonesian Singer Artists and Musicians). She then moved to Jakarta to attend high school. At age 14, she began singing professionally at Ancol Dreamland amusement park. In 1985, she first came to widespread attention when she appeared on the TVRI series Wajah Baru.

In 1986, she signed a contract with Akurama Records to release six albums. She changed her name to Isis Dahlia and released one unsuccessful album. However, the title track from her album Tamu Tak Diundang became a surprise hit, and Dahlia soon gained a reputation as a more sophisticated dangdut singer. She won an HDX Award for her album sales in 1990. In 1997, she won the Best Female Dangdut Singer at the inaugural Indonesian Dangdut Awards (ADTPI). In 2000, she recorded a new version of the Kuch Kuch Hota Hai theme song with Indian singer Ashraff. Early in her career, Dahlia would sing at various dangdut nightclubs, including Bintang-Bintang in Blok M.

In 2011, she performed at the World Interfaith Harmony Week celebration in Jakarta. She has released around 40 albums during more than 30 years in the music industry and has acted in films like Kentut (2011).

== Personal life ==
Dahlia was married to Indonesian businessman Dadang Indrajaya. In 1998, the couple had a daughter. The couple later divorced, and Dahlia married a pilot from Garuda Indonesia, Satrio Dewandono, with whom she has one son.

== Activism ==
Dahlia is a supporter of the environmental movement. Her 2004 album Samudra promoted marine conservation. She has also appeared in public service announcements to raise awareness of the risks of pregnancy-related complications.

== Discography ==
=== Solo ===
- 1989 Juned
- 1990 Tamu Tak Diundang (Uninvited Guests)
- 1990 Air Mata Tiada Arti (Meaningless Tears)
- 1991 Plin Plan (Wishy Washy)
- 1992 Kumaha
- 1993 Janda Kembang (Flower Widow)
- 1993 Ibarat Mencari Jarum Dilautan (Like Looking for a Needle in the Ocean)
- 1993 Cinta Bukanlah Kapal (Love is Not a Ship)
- 1994 Mata Hatiku (The Eyes of My Heart)
- 1994 Kasih (Love)
- 1994 Sakitnya Hatiku (My Heart is Hurt)
- 1995 Payung Hitam (Black Umbrella)
- 1995 Kejam (Cruel)
- 1995 Lupa Diri (Forget Yourself)
- 1995 Darah Biru (Blue Blood)
- 1995 Cinta Yang Ternoda (Tarnished Love)
- 1996 Rambut Sama Hitam (Hair As Black)
- 1996 Turun Ranjang (Get Off the Bed)
- 1997 Kecewa (Disappointed)
- 1997 Aku Bagai Tawanan (I'm Like Love)
- 1998 Tanda Cinta (Signs of Love)
- 1999 Ditinggal Kekasih (Left by a Lover)
- 2000 Asmara Kurindu
- 2001 PadaMu Aku Bersimpuh (On You, I Fall on My Knees)
- 2001 Kanda
- 2002 Bagai Ranting Yang Kering (Like a Dry Twig)
- 2004 Dangdut Samudra (Ocean Dangdut)
- 2005 Janji Hati (Heart Promise)
- 2007 Symphoni Malam (Symphony of the Night)
- 2008 Tiada Duanya (Matchless)
- 2008 Tunjukkanlah (Show Me)
- 2010 Ajarkan (Teach)
- 2011 Rindu (Miss)
- 2014 Jomblo Senior (Senior Single)
- 2015 Cinta Apalah Apalah (Love Whatever)
- 2015 Diva Asmara (The Diva of Romance)
- 2016 Mengapa (Why)

=== Duo ===
- 1991 Gadis Desa and Supir Taxi (Village Girl and Taxi Driver) (feat. Yus Yunus)
- 1992 Arjun (feat. Yus Yunus)
- 1993 Gara-Gara Malam Minggu (Because of Saturday Night) (feat. Tommy Ali)
- 1999 Miliki Aku Dengan Cinta (Own Me with Love) (feat. Fieter F Gontha)
- 2002 Kuch Kuch Hotta Haii (feat. Ashraff)
