= Ayu Ting Ting =

Indonesian dangdut singer (born 1992)

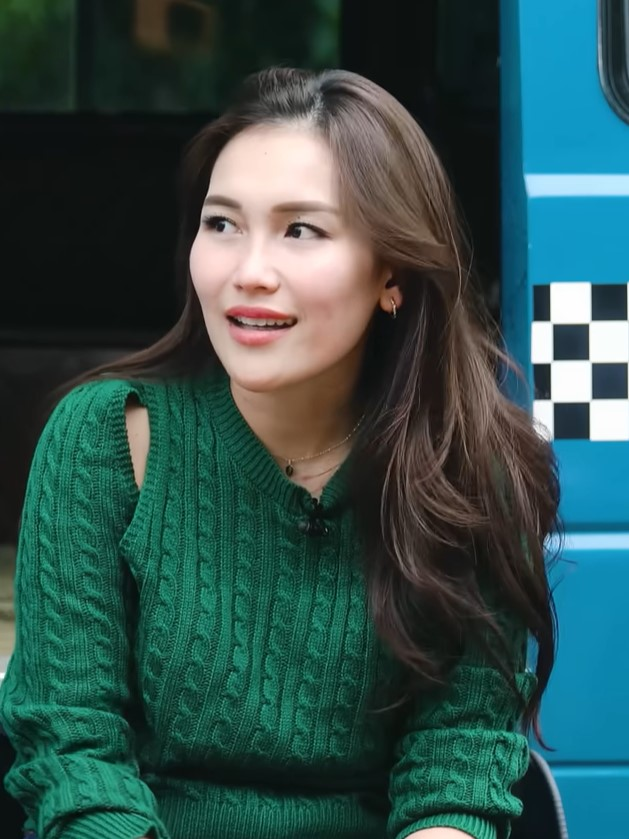
- Ayu Ting Ting in 2024
- Born: Ayu Rosmalina; June 20, 1992 (age 34); Depok, West Java, Indonesia
- Occupations: Singer; presenter; businesswoman; actress; television personality
- Musical career
- Genres: Dangdut; pop
- Years active: 2006–present

Ayu Rosmalina (born June 20, 1992), better known by her stage name Ayu Ting Ting, is an Indonesian singer and presenter. One of Indonesia's dangdut divas,, she rose to fame following the sudden virality of her song "Alamat Palsu" ("Fake Address") in 2011. Her stage name Ting Ting is an Indonesian slang for a virgin.

== Biography ==
Ayu was born in Depok, West Java on 20 June 1992 to her parents Abdul Rojak who is of mixed Betawi and Chinese descent and Umi Kalsum who is of Sundanese descent. Her father worked as a civil servant. She began modelling at the age of 5, and was introduced to dangdut music around that time. Ayu began her music career as a wedding singer at the age of 14, earning Rp. 250,000 (US$28) per performance; that year, she also became Miss Depok. In 2007, she recorded her first solo album, Dilanjut Aja (Just Continue), with Akurama Records which included "Alamat Palsu" ("Fake Address"; written by a man from Tasikmalaya) and "Ting Ting". "Ting Ting" used the title as a euphemism for 'virgin', including lyrics such as "saya masih ting-ting / dan terjamin ting-ting" ("I'm still ting-ting / and guaranteed to be ting-ting"); she later added ting ting to her first name to create a stage name, at the suggestion of her producers.

In 2010, Ayu enrolled at Gunadarma University, taking a bachelor's degree in management.

In 2011, five years after its release, "Alamat Palsu" suddenly rose to popularity, with covers by comedian Sule and singer Olga Syahputra.

== Style ==
Ayu has stated that she attempts to emphasize her voice when singing and not sell her body, something she considers common in dangdut culture; she does not use sensual movements when dancing like some of her peers. She instead attempts to be herself, although with some Korean fashion influence; her attempts to be herself have been applauded by fellow dangdut singer Julia Perez. She has been described as a tomboy, and has stated that before rising to stardom she rarely bothered with makeup.

== Personal life ==
Ayu currently lives in Depok, West Java. She is said to be uncomfortable with the sawer culture common in dangdut, where men slip the singer (commonly females) money to dance onstage with her; she has stated that she was once approached, given money, and kissed on both hands while performing, after which she stopped the show.

Ayu is a fan of K-pop, although she also likes the dangdut of Dewi Persik; she has stated that Persik's "goyang gergaji" ("saw move") requires skill and confidence that she herself does not possess.

Ayu married Henry Baskoro Hendarso (née Enji) on 4 February 2013. On 31 December 2013, she gave birth to a baby girl named Bilqis Khumairah Razak in Jakarta. On 27 January 2014, Ayu filed for divorce at the Depok Religious Court. On 1 April 2014, the court agreed to her request for divorce by verstek (without her spouse present), valid two weeks after its decision if it was not challenged by Enji.

In 2015, Ayu was in a relationship with Indian actor Shaheer Sheikh. The relationship lasted for four months before they broke up.

In September 2017, Ayu Ting Ting was invited to Music Bank. As a K-pop fan, she was able to perform K-pop songs with style.

== Discography ==
- Geol Ajep-Ajep (2006)
- Best of Ayu Ting Ting (2015)
