= SCTV Awards =

Annual Indonesian television awards

- Awarded for: Outstanding achievement for Indonesian entertainment industry
- Country: Indonesia
- First award: 2001
- Website: Liputan6.com: SCTV Awards

Television/radio coverage
- Network: SCTV

The SCTV Awards are annual Indonesian awards that are presented by SCTV, which recognize popularity in the television industry, and which correspond to the SCTV Music Awards (for music). The annual show was first held on August 24, 2001, SCTV's 11th anniversary. Until 2009, SCTV Awards held every August to celebrate SCTV's anniversary.

== Dates and locations ==
Edition	Date	Venue	City	Theme	Ref.
1st	August 24, 2001	Teater Tanah Airku, Taman Mini Indonesia Indah	East Jakarta	—N/a	
2nd	August 30, 2002	Jakarta Convention Centre	Central Jakarta	—N/a	
3rd	August 29, 2003	Jakarta Convention Centre	Central Jakarta	—N/a	
4th	August 27, 2004	News Cafe, Kemang	South Jakarta	—N/a	
5th	August 25, 2005	Jakarta Convention Centre	Central Jakarta	Kemilau 15 Tahun	
6th	August 25, 2006	Jakarta Convention Centre	Central Jakarta	Eksotika Indonesia	
7th	August 24, 2007	Jakarta Convention Centre	Central Jakarta	Negeri Dongeng	
8th	August 29, 2008	Jakarta Convention Centre	Central Jakarta	Across the Universe	
9th	August 14, 2009	Jakarta Convention Centre	Central Jakarta	Persembahan Cinta	
10th	October 28, 2010	Balai Sarbini	Central Jakarta	Harmoni Indonesia	
11th	November 25, 2011	Balai Sarbini	Central Jakarta	Harmoni Cinta Karya Indonesia	
12th	November 30, 2012	Teater Tanah Airku, Taman Mini Indonesia Indah	East Jakarta	—N/a	
13th	November 29, 2013	JIEXPO Hall D2, Kemayoran	North Jakarta	Celebrate Like a Star	
14th	November 29, 2014	Studio 6 Daan Mogot	West Jakarta	Cinta Teristimewa	
15th	November 28, 2015	Studio 6, Emtek City, Daan Mogot	West Jakarta	—N/a	
16th	November 30, 2016	Studio 6, Emtek City	West Jakarta	Home of the Stars	

== Voting System ==
The show are voted in by SCTV audiences throughout Indonesia and therefore reflect the popular choices of a significant portion of the television viewing public in the country.

== Awards categories ==
Awards are presented in several categories, including Famous Lead Role Actress, Famous Lead Role Actor, Famous Supporting Role Actor, Famous Supporting Role Actress, Famous Presenter, Famous Singer, Famous Group Band, Famous Advertisement, and Famous Program. The Lifetime Achievement Award is presented to individuals with lifetime dedication to the entertainment industry.

In 2009, the show introduced the Famous Supporting Role Actor and Famous Supporting Role Actress categories.

== Winners ==
=== 2001 SCTV Awards (1st) ===
Category	Winner
Famous Actor	Anjasmara
Famous Actress	Bella Saphira
Famous Presenter	Ulfa Dwiyanti
Famous Singer	Krisdayanti
Famous Group Band	Sheila on 7
Famous Program	Liputan 6
Famous Advertisement	Surf (Learn to Walk version)
Lifetime Achievement Award	Titiek Puspa

=== 2002 SCTV Awards ===
Category	Winner
Famous Actor	Anjasmara
Famous Actress	Agnes Monica
Famous Presenter	Ulfa Dwiyanti
Famous Singer	Krisdayanti
Famous Dangdut Singer	Ikke Nurjanah
Famous Group Band	Padi
Famous Drama Program	FTV
Famous non-Drama Program	Liputan 6
Famous Advertisement	Sampoerna Hijau (Falling Star version)
Lifetime Achievement Award	Christine Hakim

=== 2003 SCTV Awards ===
Category	Winner
Famous Actor	Anjasmara
Famous Actress	Inul Daratista
Famous Presenter	Ulfa Dwiyanti
Famous Singer	Krisdayanti
Famous Dangdut Singer	Inul Daratista
Famous Group Band	Dewa 19
Famous Drama Program	FTV
Famous non-Drama Program	Liputan 6
Lifetime Achievement Award	Chrisye

=== 2004 SCTV Awards ===
Category	Winner
Famous Actor	Anjasmara
Famous Actress	Agnes Monica
Famous Presenter	Ulfa Dwiyanti
Famous Singer	Iwan Fals
Famous Dangdut Singer	Inul Daratista
Famous Group Band	Sheila on 7
Famous Drama Program	Tangisan Anak Tiri
Famous non-Drama Program	Sang Bintang
Famous Advertisement	Yamaha Jupiter (Speech version)
Lifetime Achievement Award	Nani Widjaja

=== 2005 SCTV Awards ===
Category	Winner
Famous Actor	Anjasmara
Famous Actress	Agnes Monica
Famous Presenter	Eko Patrio
Famous Singer	Krisdayanti
Famous Dangdut Singer	Ira Swara
Famous Group Band	Peterpan
Famous Program	Malin Kundang
Famous Advertisement	Pro XL (Clock version)
Lifetime Achievement Award	Deddy Mizwar

=== 2006 SCTV Awards ===
Category	Winner
Famous Actor	Raffi Ahmad
Famous Actress	Laudya Cynthia Bella
Famous Presenter	Donna Agnesia
Famous Singer	Ratu
Famous Advertisement	Djarum (Cat Mouse version)
Famous Program	Mimpi Manis
Famous Group Band	Radja
Lifetime Achievement Award	Jojon

=== 2007 SCTV Awards ===
Category	Winner
Famous Actor	Teuku Wisnu
Famous Actress	Cinta Laura
Famous Presenter	Nirina Zubir
Famous Group Band	Ungu
Famous Singer	Gita Gutawa
Famous Program	Cinderella (Apakah Cinta Hanyalah Mimpi?)
Lifetime Achievement Award	(alm.) Taufik Savalas

=== 2008 SCTV Awards ===
Category	Winner
Famous Actor	Teuku Wisnu
Famous Actress	Shireen Sungkar
Famous Presenter	Andhara Early
Famous Singer	Rossa
Famous Group Band	Ungu
Famous Program	Cinta Fitri
Famous Advertisement	XL (Fitting Room version)
Lifetime Achievement Award	Ida Kusumah

=== 2009 SCTV Awards ===
Category	Winner
Famous Actor	Teuku Wisnu
Famous Actress	Shireen Sungkar
Famous Group Band	Ungu
Famous Singer	Afgan Syahreza
Famous Supporting Role Actor	Adly Fairuz
Famous Supporting Role Actress	Dinda Kanya Dewi
Famous Advertisement	Yamaha (Komeng vs. Valentino Rossi version)
Famous Presenter	Ivan Gunawan
Famous Program	Cinta Fitri
Lifetime Achievement Award	Widyawati & (alm.) Sophan Sophiaan

=== 2010 SCTV Awards ===
Category	Winner
Famous Actor	Teuku Wisnu
Famous Actress	Shireen Sungkar
Famous Group Band	ST 12
Famous Singer	Afgan Syahreza
Famous Supporting Role Actor	Adly Fairuz
Famous Supporting Role Actress	Dinda Kanya Dewi
Famous Advertisement	XL (Baim Riddles version)
Famous Presenter	Cinta Kuya
Famous Program	Cinta Fitri Season 6
Lifetime Achievement Award	Franky Sahilatua

=== 2011 SCTV Awards ===
Category	Winner
Famous Actor	Stefan William
Famous Actress	Yuki Kato
Famous Group Band	Wali
Famous Singer	Syahrini
Famous Supporting Role Actor	Reza Aditya
Famous Supporting Role Actress	Zaskia Adya Mecca
Famous Advertisement	XL (Insect Repellent version)
Famous Presenter	Cinta Kuya
Famous Program	Ku Pinang Kau Dengan Bismillah
Lifetime Achievement Award	Rhoma Irama

== See also ==
- List of Asian television awards
