= 2014 SCTV Awards =

- Date: November 29, 2014
- Location: Studio 6, Daan Mogot, West Jakarta
- Hosted by: Andhika Pratama; Narji; Audi Marissa; Gading Marten

Television/radio coverage
- Network: SCTV

The 2014 SCTV Awards honored the popular in Indonesian television program and music. The ceremony awards was held at the Studio 6 in Daan Mogot, West Jakarta, on November 29, 2014, and was broadcast on SCTV. It was hosted by Andhika Pratama, Narji, Audi Marissa, and Gading Marten. The ceremony awards were attendees included Syahrini, Wali, Geisha, and others.

This year edition of ceremony awards were adding for three new categories, are Most Famous Young Artist, Most Famous Soap Opera Soundtrack and Most Favorite Social Media Artist. A Lifetime Achievement Award was also presented back.

== Winners and nominees ==
The nominees were announced in November 2014. The winners are listed on boldface.

Most Famous Leading Actor	Most Famous Leading Actress
**Aliando Syarief – Ganteng-Ganteng Serigala**; Dimas Anggara – Diam-Diam Suka; Kevin Julio – Ganteng-Ganteng Serigala; Ricky Harun – Ganteng-Ganteng Serigala; Ucup Nirin (Ocid) – Emak Ijah Pengen Ke Mekah	**Prilly Latuconsina – Ganteng-Ganteng Serigala**; Audi Marissa – Diam-Diam Suka; Febby Rastanty – Diam-Diam Suka; Jessica Mila – Ganteng-Ganteng Serigala; Melody Prima – ABG Jadi Manten
Most Famous Supporting Actor	Most Famous Supporting Actress
**Fero Walandouw – Diam-Diam Suka**; Aldi Taher – Emak Ijah Pengen Ke Mekah; Billy Davidson – Diam-Diam Suka; Bobby Maulana – Emak Ijah Pengen Ke Mekah; Ricky Cuaca – Ganteng-Ganteng Serigala	**Dahlia Poland – Ganteng-Ganteng Serigala**; Agatha Pricilla – Diam-Diam Suka; Michelle Joan – Ganteng-Ganteng Serigala; Michelle Ziudith – Diam-Diam Suka; Titi Kamal – Emak Ijah Pengen Ke Mekah
Most Famous Singer	Most Famous Younger Artist
**Syahrini**; Afgan; Fatin Shidqia; Judika; Raisa	**Soni Wakwaw**; Alifa; Andro Trinanda (Akmal); Mischa Foruna (Mancung); Sekar (Lala)
Most Famous Group Band	Most Famous Boyband/Girlband
**Wali**; Geisha; Kotak; Noah; Yovie & Nuno	**CJR**; Blink; Cherrybelle; JKT48; SM*SH
Most Famous Presenter	Most Famous Advertisement
**Andhika Pratama**; Gading Marten; Narji Cagur; Rafael SM*SH; Rangga SM*SH	**Roma Kelapa Biskuit (Indy Barends version)**; Djarum Super (Plunge of the plane version); Indomie (Oil and water version); Mito A77 (Afgan selfie version); Wardah (Dewi Sandra in Paris version)
Most Famous Soap Opera Soundtrack	Most Famous Soap Opera
**"Sakitnya Tuh Disini" performed by Cita Citata – Diam-Diam Suka**; "Diam-Diam Suka" performed by Cherrybelle – Diam-Diam Suka; "Hujan" performed by Utopia – Ganteng-Ganteng Serigala; "Mencintaimu Sampai Mati" performed by Utopia – Ganteng-Ganteng Serigala; "Munaroh" performed by Trio Ubur Ubur – Emak Ijah Pengen Ke Mekah	**Ganteng-Ganteng Serigala**; ABG Jadi Manten; Diam-Diam Suka; Emak Ijah Pengen Ke Mekah; Para Pencari Tuhan
Most Favorite Social Media Artist
**Prilly Latuconsina**
