= 2015 SCTV Awards =

- Date: November 28, 2015
- Location: Studio 6 Emtek City, Daan Mogot, West Jakarta
- Hosted by: Andhika Pratama; Gading Marten; Audi Marissa; Uus

Television/radio coverage
- Network: SCTV

The 2015 SCTV Awards honored popular Indonesian television programming and music. The 2015 edition was held at Studio 6 Emtek City in Daan Mogot, West Jakarta, on November 28, 2015. The ceremony was hosted by Andhika Pratama, Gading Marten, Audi Marissa, and Uus and was broadcast live on SCTV. Attendees included Syahrini, Five Minutes, CJR, Shae and many others.

Nominations were made by the public through SMS messages. A set of judges then determined the winners. SCTV added three categories to this year's awards: Most Famous Television Film, Most Famous Movie and Most Famous Infotainment. They had a special category: Most Popular Foreign Program, which was awarded to Turkish TV series program Elif.

== Performances ==
| Artist(s) | Song(s) |
|---|---|
| Kotak | "Rock N Love" "Terbang" |
| Syahrini | "Sesuatu" "Seperti Itu" |
| Prilly Latuconsina | "Sahabat Hidup" |
| Syahrini; DJ Kevin Bum | "Dream Big" |
| PrillynCJRocks (Prilly Latuconsina and CJR) | Medley: "Beraksi" "Galau" "Lumpuhkan Ingatanku" "Tanpa Cinta" "Hidup Untukmu Mati Tanpamu" |
| Five Minutes; Zaskia Gotik | "Selalu Menunggumu" "Bang Jono" |
| Lesti D'Academy | "Arjuna Mencari Cinta" |
| Aliando Syarief and the Girlz | "Pergi Dari Hatiku" |
| DJ Rizuka; Shae; DJ Arida; Cita Citata | "Gojigo" "Goyang Dumang" "Aku Suka Kamu" "Meriang" |
| Nassar; Inul Daratista | "Gejolak Asmara" "Kalimerah Athena" "Anoman Obong" |

== Presenters ==
- Michelle Ziudith, Rizky Nazar, and Dimas Anggara – Most Famous Supporting Actor
- Ganteng-Ganteng Serigala Returns' cast – Most Famous Singer
- Gading Marten, Andhika Pratama, and Uus – Most Famous Supporting Actress
- Syahrini, Ernest Prakasa, Kemal Pahlevi, Arif Didu, and Mo Sidik – Most Famous Soap Opera Soundtrack
- Rizky Nazar, Ricky Harun, Aliando Syarief, and Kevin Julio – Most Famous Advertisement
- Tsania Mawar, Alatarik Syah, and Rizky Nazar – Most Popular Foreign Program
- Syahrini – Most Famous Presenter
- Pangeran' cast – Most Famous Television Film
- Rizki & Ridho D'Academy, Lesti D'Academy, and Salsadilla – Most Famous Infotainment
- Audi Marissa and Hardi Fadillah – Most Famous Movie
- Dion Wiyoko, Adila Fitri, and Michelle Ziudith – Most Famous Leading Actor
- Shandy Syarief, Bobby Maulana, Kia Florita, and Chaca Thakya – Most Famous Leading Actress
- Andhika Pratama, Audi Marissa, Gading Marten, and Uus – Most Famous Soap Opera

== Nominees and winners ==
The nominees were announced on October 30, 2015. Winners are highlighted in bold.

| Most Famous Leading Actor | Most Famous Leading Actress |
|---|---|
| **Ricky Harun – Pangeran**; Aliando Syarief – Ganteng-Ganteng Serigala Returns; Dimas Anggara – Diam-Diam Suka: Cinta Lama Bersemi Kembali; Kevin Julio – Ganteng-Ganteng Serigala Returns; Rizky Nazar – High School Love Story | **Prilly Latuconsina – Ganteng-Ganteng Serigala Returns**; Febby Rastanty – High School Love Story; Jessica Mila – Ganteng-Ganteng Serigala Returns; Michelle Ziudith – Cantik-Cantik Magic; Nina Zatulini – Pangeran |
| Most Famous Supporting Actor | Most Famous Supporting Actress |
| **Handika Pratama – Samson dan Dahlia**; Baron Yusuf – Madun; Billy Davidson –Diam-Diam Suka: Cinta Lama Bersemi Kembali; Fero Walandouw – High School Love Story; Reza Aditya – Pangeran | **Audi Marissa – Kampung Akik**; Agatha Pricilla – High School Love Story; Fita Anggriani - Pangeran; Fitri Ayu – Pangeran; Michelle Joan – Ganteng-Ganteng Serigala Returns |
| Most Famous Singer | Most Famous Group Band |
| **Syahrini**; Agnez Mo; Isyana Sarasvati; Raisa; Tulus | **Noah**; Five Minutes; Geisha; Kotak; Yovie & Nuno |
| Most Famous Presenter | Most Famous Soap Opera Soundtrack |
| **Gading Marten**; Andhika Pratama; Audi Marissa; Ferry Maryadi; Irfan Hakim | **"Jangan Kau Bohong" performed by Fatin Shidqia – High School Love Story**; "Mencintaimu Sampai Mati" performed by Utopia – Ganteng-Ganteng Serigala; "Menunggumu" performed by Noah – Ganteng-Ganteng Serigala Returns; "Pangeran Cinta" performed by Dewa 19 – Pangeran; "Tak Bisakah" performed by Peterpan – Ganteng-Ganteng Serigala Returns |
| Most Famous Television Film | Most Famous Movie |
| **Gulai Kambing Rasa Move On**; Biang Kerok Kampung Beruntung; Cakep-Cakep Penjaga Pintu; Gejolak Cinta Tukang Kolak; Ibu Een Guru Qalbu | **Marmut Merah Jambu**; Bajaj Bajuri The Movie; Hijrah Cinta; Merry Riana; Soekarno |
| Most Famous Infotainment | Most Famous Advertisement |
| **Halo Selebriti**; Hot Shot; Status Selebriti; Was Was | **Pepsodent (Aliando and Prilly version)**; Energen (Good Is Not Enough version); Indomie (Challenge Indomie Goreng Day version); Kapal Api Reguler Black (Deal version); Nourish Skin (Yuni Shara in beach version) |
| Most Famous Soap Opera | Most Popular Foreign Program |
| **Pangeran**; 3 Semprul Mengejar Surga 3; Ganteng-Ganteng Serigala Returns; High School Love Story; Madun | **Elif** |
