= List of awards and nominations received by Syahrini =

Syahrini awards and nominations
Awards and nominations
Award	Wins	Nominations
Anugerah Musik Indonesia	0	4
Dahsyatnya Awards	3	12
Global Seru Awards	1	2
Inbox Awards	3	12
Insert Awards	3	9
Infotainment Awards	7	12
Nickelodeon Indonesia Kids' Choice Awards	2	3
SCTV Awards	6	8
SCTV Music Awards	3	6
Yahoo! OMG Awards	2	2
Silet Awards	2	2

Totals (Note: Certain award groups do not simply award one winner. They acknowledge several different recipients, have runners-up, and have third place. Since this is a specific recognition and is different from losing an award, runner-up mentions are considered wins in this award tally. For simplification and to avoid errors, each award in this list has been presumed to have had a prior nomination.)
- Wins: 32
- Nominations: 101

Syahrini is an Indonesian singer, songwriter, and actress. This is list awards received by Syahrini:

== Ada-Ada Aja Awards ==
The Ada-Ada Aja Awards are an awards ceremony presented by Global TV and the program Ada-Ada Aja for celebrities who had to be guest stars in the Global TV' reality show. Syahrini has received one award.

Year	Nominee / work	Award	Result	Ref.
2016	Syahrini	Most Especial Artist	Won	

== Anugerah Musik Indonesia ==
The Anugerah Musik Indonesia (English translation: Indonesian Music Awards), is an annual Indonesian major music awards. They have been compared to the American Grammy Awards and British Brit Awards. The award was formalized in 1997 by ASIRI (Association of Indonesia Recording Industry), PAPPRI (Association of Indonesian Singers, Songwriters and Music Record Producers), and KCI (Copyright Office of Indonesia). It is the highest music awards given to outstanding artists in Indonesia.

Year	Nominee / work	Award	Result	Ref.
2012	"Kau Yang Memilih Aku"	Best Pop Female Solo Artist	Nominated	
2014	"Semua Karena Cinta"	Best Pop Female Solo Artist	Nominated	
2015	"Cetarrrrr"	Best Dance/Electronic Production Work	Nominated	
2016	"Dream Big" (feat. DJ Kevin Bun)	Best Dance/Electronic Production Work	Nominated	

== Bintang RPTI Awards ==
Year	Nominee / work	Award	Result	Ref.
2012	Syahrini	Celebrity Top Rating of the Year	Nominated	—

== Bright Awards ==
The Bright Awards is a giving awards to creative people the world of advertising the country on television advertising are considered the most communicative. This awards show has teamed up with MNC Media and Unity of Indonesian Advertising Companies.

Year	Nominee / work	Award	Result	Ref.
2016	Syahrini	Favorite Female Star Advertisement	Nominated	

== Dahsyatnya Awards ==
First established in 2009, the Dahsyatnya Awards are an awards ceremony were presented by the daily Indonesian TV show Dahsyat that airs on RCTI, to honour for artist who had more popular/outstanding (Indonesian: Terdahsyat) in music chart. Syahrini received three awards from 12 nominations.

Year	Nominee / work	Award	Result	Ref.
2011	"Jangan Memilih Aku" (feat. Anang Hermansyah)	Outstanding Song	Nominated	
2011	Anang Hermansyah & Syahrini	Outstanding Duo/Group Singer	Won	
2012	"Kau Yang Memilih Aku"	Outstanding Song	Won	
2012	Syahrini	Outstanding Female Solo Singer	Nominated	
2013	Syahrini	Outstanding Female Solo Singer	Nominated	
2013	Syahrini	Outstanding Stage Act	Nominated	
2014	Syahrini	Outstanding Female Solo Singer	Won	
2014	Syahrini	Outstanding Stage Act	Nominated	
2014	Syahrini & Raffi Ahmad	Outstanding Couple	Nominated	
2015	Syahrini & Maruli Tampubolon	Outstanding Duet/Collaboration	Nominated	
2015	Syahrini	Outstanding Female Solo Singer	Nominated	
2016	Syahrini	Outstanding Female Solo Singer	Nominated	

== Fokus Selebriti Awards ==
The Fokus Selebriti Awards are an awards ceremony, presented by infotainment Fokus Selebriti, awarding a celebrity who had to be phenomenal in life story and had the hottest news.

Year	Nominee / work	Award	Result	Ref.
2015	Syahrini	Favorite Exciting Celebrity	Nominated	

== Global Seru Awards ==
The Global Seru Awards are awarded to celebrities who have caught the attention of the public through interesting or exciting accomplishments. Syahrini received one award from 2 nominations.

Year	Nominee / work	Award	Result	Ref.
2015	Syahrini	Most Exciting Hit	Nominated	
2015	Syahrini	Most Exciting Social Media Artist	Won	

== Grazia Glitz & Glam Awards ==
The Grazia Glitz & Glam Awards are an off-air awards ceremony were presented by magazine Grazia Indonesia, to honour for celebrity in fashion and entertainment. Syahrini received one award.

Year	Nominee / work	Award	Result	Ref.
2013	Syahrini	Social Media Influencer	Won	

== Inbox Awards ==
Presented by Inbox and SCTV on 2008, the Inbox Awards are an annual awards had recognized to talent in music and entertainment. Syahrini received three awards from 12 nominations.

Year	Nominee / work	Award	Result	Ref.
2011	"Kau Yang Memilih Aku"	Most Inbox Song	Nominated	
2011	Syahrini	Most Inbox Solo Singer	Won	
2011	Syahrini	Most Inbox Appearance	Nominated	
2012	Syahrini	Most Inbox Female Solo Singer	Won	
2012	Syahrini	Most Inbox Appearance	Nominated	
2013	Syahrini	Most Inbox Female Solo Singer	Won	
2013	Syahrini	Most Inbox Appearance	Nominated	
2014	Syahrini	Most Inbox Female Solo Singer	Nominated	
2015	Syahrini	Most Inbox Female Solo Singer	Nominated	
2015	Syahrini	Most Inbox Darling Social Media Artist	Nominated	
2015	"Seperti Itu"	Most Inbox Song	Nominated	
2016	Syahrini	Most Inbox Female Solo Singer	Nominated	

== Indigo Digital Music Awards ==
The Indigo Digital Music Awards (formerly Indigo Awards), are an annual award were presented by PT. Telekomunikasi Indonesia (Telkom) in 2009, to honour for artist, who have their song used most as ringback tones in all categories of creative industries and provide benefits for society, the environment, and create new business opportunities.

Year	Nominee / work	Award	Result	Ref.
2011	Syahrini	Best Female Artist	Nominated	
2011	Syahrini	Best Pop Artist/Band	Nominated	

== Indonesian Social Media Awards ==
First established in 2016 by SCTV, the Indonesian Social Media Awards are an annual awards were honour for celebrity and voted by fans in each social media, such as Facebook, Snapchat, Twitter and Instagram.

Year	Nominee / work	Award	Result	Ref.
2016	Syahrini	Female Celeb Instagram	Nominated	

== Indonesian Television Awards ==
First established in 2016, the Indonesian Television Awards are an awards were to honour for talent in entertainment and program television for motivation to spawn creativity as well as innovation.

Year	Nominee / work	Award	Result	Ref.
2016	Syahrini	Most Popular Singer	Nominated	

== Indosat Awards ==
The Indosat Awards are music awards presented by telecommunications provider Indosat, first presented in 2011. The awards are based on the popularity of a singer, as derived from sales, stage appearances, and radio chart positions.

Year	Nominee / work	Award	Result	Ref.
2011	Syahrini	Best Female Artist	Nominated	
2011	"Jangan Memilih Aku" (with Anang Hermansyah)	Most Popular Collaboration	Nominated	

== Infotainment Awards ==
The Infotainment Awards are an awards ceremony were presented by SCTV and began established since 2012, to awarded for celebrity in entertainment. Syahrini received seven awards from 12 nominations.

Year	Nominee / work	Award	Result	Ref.
2012	Syahrini	Most Infotainment Celebrity	Won	
2012	Syahrini	Most Infotainment Dressed Celebrity	Won	
2013	Syahrini	Most Lure Female Celebrity	Won	
2013	Syahrini	Most Awaited Celebrity Appearance	Nominated	
2014	Syahrini	Most Lure Female Celebrity	Nominated	
2014	Syahrini	Most Fashionable Female Celebrity	Won	
2015	Syahrini	Most Lure Female Celebrity	Nominated	
2015	Syahrini	Most Awaited Celebrity Appearance	Nominated	
2015	Syahrini	Celebrity of the Year	Nominated	
2015	Syahrini	Most Fashionable Female Celebrity	Won	
2016	Syahrini	Most Fashionable Female Celebrity	Won	
2017	Syahrini	Most Fashionable Female Celebrity	Won	

== Insert ==
=== Insert Awards ===
The Insert Awards are an awards ceremony presented by program Insert, to awarded for celebrities in entertainment. Syahrini has received three awards from 8 nominations.

Year	Nominee / work	Award	Result	Ref.
2011	Syahrini	Sexiest Female	Nominated	
2011	Syahrini	Celebrity of the Year	Nominated	
2011	Alhamdullilah Ya, Sesuatu Banget	Most Popular Words	Won	
2012	Syahrini	Celebrity of the Year	Won	
2012	Syahrini	The Richest and The Most Famous Celeb	Nominated	
2014	Syahrini's Jargon Sensation	The Hottest Celebrity News	Nominated	
2014	Syahrini	The Iconic Celebrity	Nominated	
2016	Syahrini	Celebrity of Social Media Award	Nominated	

=== Insert Fashion Awards ===
Year	Nominee / work	Award	Result	Ref.
2015	Syahrini	Most Fashionable Hair Do Celebrity	Nominated	
2015	Syahrini	Most Fashionable Female Celebrity	Nominated	
2016	Syahrini	Favorite Female Celebrity	Won	

== KLIK! Awards ==
The KLIK! Awards was an awards ceremony were established in 2011 and presented by program KLIK!, to honour for artist and clip makers in music.

Year	Nominee / work	Award	Result	Ref.
2011	"Kau Yang Memilih Aku"	Best Phenomenal Singer Artist	Nominated	

== Nickelodeon Indonesia Kids' Choice Awards ==
The Nickelodeon Indonesia Kids' Choice Awards is Indonesian version of Nickelodeon Kids' Choice Awards, held since 2008 in Jakarta. Syahrini received two awards from 3 nominations.

Year	Nominee / work	Award	Result	Ref.
2015	Syahrini	Favorite Singer	Nominated	
2015	Syahrini	Icon of the Year	Won	
2015	Syahrini	Slime Star	Won	

== Obsesi Awards ==
Year	Nominee / work	Award	Result	Ref.
2016	Syahrini	Most Excessive Celebrity	Won	

== Panasonic Gobel Awards ==
The Panasonic Gobel Awards is an award presented to television programs and individuals, based on poll results. The poll was originally conducted by the Indonesian tabloid Citra, but was taken over by Nielsen Media Research in 2004.

Year	Nominee / work	Award	Result	Ref.
2015	Princess Syahrini	Favorite Entertainment Talkshow Program	Nominated	

== Pop Awards ==
The Pop Awards are an awards ceremony for celebrities which pervasive inspire the younger generation. The show was first held in 2016, which aired on RCTI.

Year	Nominee / work	Award	Result	Ref.
2016	Syahrini	Female Pop Awards	Nominated	

== SCTV Awards ==
The SCTV Awards are an awards ceremony were presented by Indonesian TV station SCTV and began established in 2001, to honour talented artists who became popular (Indonesian: Ngetop) in entertainment, based on audience votes. Syahrini received five awards from 7 nominations.

Year	Nominee / work	Award	Result	Ref.
2011	Syahrini	Famous Singer	Won	
2012	Syahrini	Famous Singer	Won	
2013	Syahrini	Famous Singer	Won	
2014	Syahrini	Famous Singer	Won	
2015	Syahrini	Famous Singer	Won	
2016	Syahrini	Famous Singer	Nominated	
2017	Syahrini	Famous Singer	Nominated	

== SCTV Music Awards ==
First established in 2002, the SCTV Music Awards are an annual award presented by SCTV, to honour talented artists who became popular (Indonesian: Ngetop) in music with the winner selected based on voting public through SMS. Syahrini received three awards from 6 nominations.

Year	Nominee / work	Award	Result	Ref.
2012	Sesuatu (single)	Most Famous Female Solo Pop Album	Won	
2012	"Kau Yang Memilih Aku"	Most Famous Song	Nominated	
2013	Syahrini	Most Famous Female Solo Singer	Nominated	
2014	Syahrini	Most Famous Female Solo Singer	Won	
2015	Syahrini	Most Famous Female Solo Singer	Won	
2016	Syahrini	Most Famous Female Solo Singer	Nominated	

== Seleb On News Awards ==
The Seleb On News Awards are an annual awards were presented by infotainment Seleb On News to awarded for celebrities which to be part in entertainment.

Year	Nominee / work	Award	Result	Ref.
2016	Syahrini	Most Sexiest Celeb	Nominated	
2016	Syahrini	Most Wanted Celeb	Nominated	
2016	Syahrini	Most Social Media Celeb	Nominated	
2017	Syahrini	Most Social Media Celeb	Nominated	

== Selebrita Awards ==
The Selebrita Awards are an awards ceremony were presented by infotainment Selebrita, to awarded for celebrity in entertainment and based on voted by fans in website poll. Syahrini has received one award from three awards.

Year	Nominee / work	Award	Result	Ref.
2013	Syahrini	Woman of the Year	Won	
2015	Syahrini	Most Exist Celeb	Nominated	
2016	Syahrini	Most Exist Celeb	Nominated	
2017	Syahrini	Most Exist Celeb	Nominated	

== Silet Awards ==
The Silet Awards was an awards ceremony were presented by RCTI' infotainment Silet and established in 2014, to awarded for celebrity who had to be part in infotainment program. Syahrini received one award.

Year	Nominee / work	Award	Result	Ref.
2014	Syahrini	Razored Phenomenal Artist	Won	

== Social Media Awards ==
The Social Media Awards are presented to the businesses, brands, and people who are most widely discussed positively in social media. The recognizes those who successfully use social media to establish communications with consumer and fans. Syahrini received one award.

Year	Nominee / work	Award	Result	Ref.
2014	Syahrini	Best Singer in Social Media	Won	

== Socmed Awards ==
The Socmed Awards is an awards to celebrities and public figures who dominated the popularity of various social media platforms, such as Twitter, Instagram, Blogs, and YouTube.

Year	Nominee / work	Award	Result	Ref.
2016	Syahrini	Celeb Gram Female	Nominated	

== Yahoo! OMG Awards ==
The Yahoo! OMG Awards are an online awards were honour to celebrity in entertainment, based on fans by visiting the website. Its first established in 2012. Syahrini received two awards.

Year	Nominee / work	Award	Result	Ref.
2012	Syahrini	Most Exposed Celeb (Reader's Choice)	Won	
2014	Syahrini	Most Overexposed Celeb	Won	
