= Aini =

Ayni or Aini may refer to:

- Aini, Maharashtra, a small village in Ratnagiri district, Maharashtra state in Western India
- Aini: Malaikat Tak Bersayap, an Indonesian drama series
- Ayni District in Sughd Province, Tajikistan
  - Ayni, Ayni District, the capital of Ayni District in Tajikistan
  - Ayni, Varzob District, a town in Varzob district, Tajikistan
  - Farkhor Air Base, a.k.a. Ayni Air Base, in Tajikistan
- Badr al-Din al-Ayni, Islamic scholar
- Lea Aini, Israeli author
- Mehdi Hasan Aini Qasmi, Indian Islamic scholar and social activist
- Sadriddin Aini, Tajik writer
- Artocarpus hirsutus, a tropical evergreen tree
- Äynu people, a people from the Xinjiang region of western China
- Äynu language, the language of the Äynu
- Áine, an Irish goddess
- Ayni, a form of communal work in the Andes
