= Dangerous Rose =

Indonesian television series

- Also known as: Bunga di Tepi Jurang
- Genre: Melodrama
- Created by: Agung Saputra
- Directed by: Angling Sagaran
- Starring: Claresta Taufan; Stefan William; Erika Carlina; Aliando Syarief
- Country of origin: Indonesia
- Original language: Indonesian
- No. of seasons: 1

Production
- Producer: Agung Saputra
- Camera setup: Multi-camera
- Production company: Leo Pictures

Original release
- Network: iQIYI; MAXstream
- Release: 31 July 2026

Dangerous Rose (Bunga di Tepi Jurang) is an Indonesian television melodrama series that aired on 31 July 2024 on iQIYI and MAXstream. Produced by Leo Pictures and starring Claresta Taufan, Stefan William, Erika Carlina, and Aliando Syarief.

== Plot ==
Andini, a village girl struggling to change her fate in the big city. Amidst the hardships of life, ambition, and betrayal, she must rise from adversity to climb the fashion industry and rediscover her self-worth amidst the abyss of destruction.

== Cast ==
- Claresta Taufan as Nadin Adinata
- Stefan William as Maxwell
- Erika Carlina as Joanna
- Aliando Syarief as Aldy
- Derby Romero as Rafael
- Rachel Vennya as Davina
- Anjasmara as Burhan
- Olla Ramlan as Mami Angel
- Christ Laurent as Arya
- Hana Saraswati as Ranti
- Panuwat Sopradit as Somchai
- Dilan Janiyar as Ela
- Raden Rakha as Indra
- Indra Brasco as Jaka
- Trista Molina as Mike
- Giorgio Antonio as Koko Tajir
- Aldi Taher as Kepala Pabrik
- Sule as Juragan Idris
- Cut Keke as Imah
- Windy Wulandari as Ibu Arya

== Production ==
=== Development ===
In May 2026, Leo Pictures announced new series titled "Bunga di Tepi Jurang".

=== Casting ===
Giorgio Antonio has been confirmed to play Koko Tajir and make his television debut. Claresta Taufan was roped in for the role of Andini. Thai actor Mos Panuwat joins the series as Somchai. The couple Olla Ramlan and Tristan Molina also join as Mami Angel and Mike respectively.
