= Prilly Latuconsina =

Indonesian actress, host, and singer (born 1996)

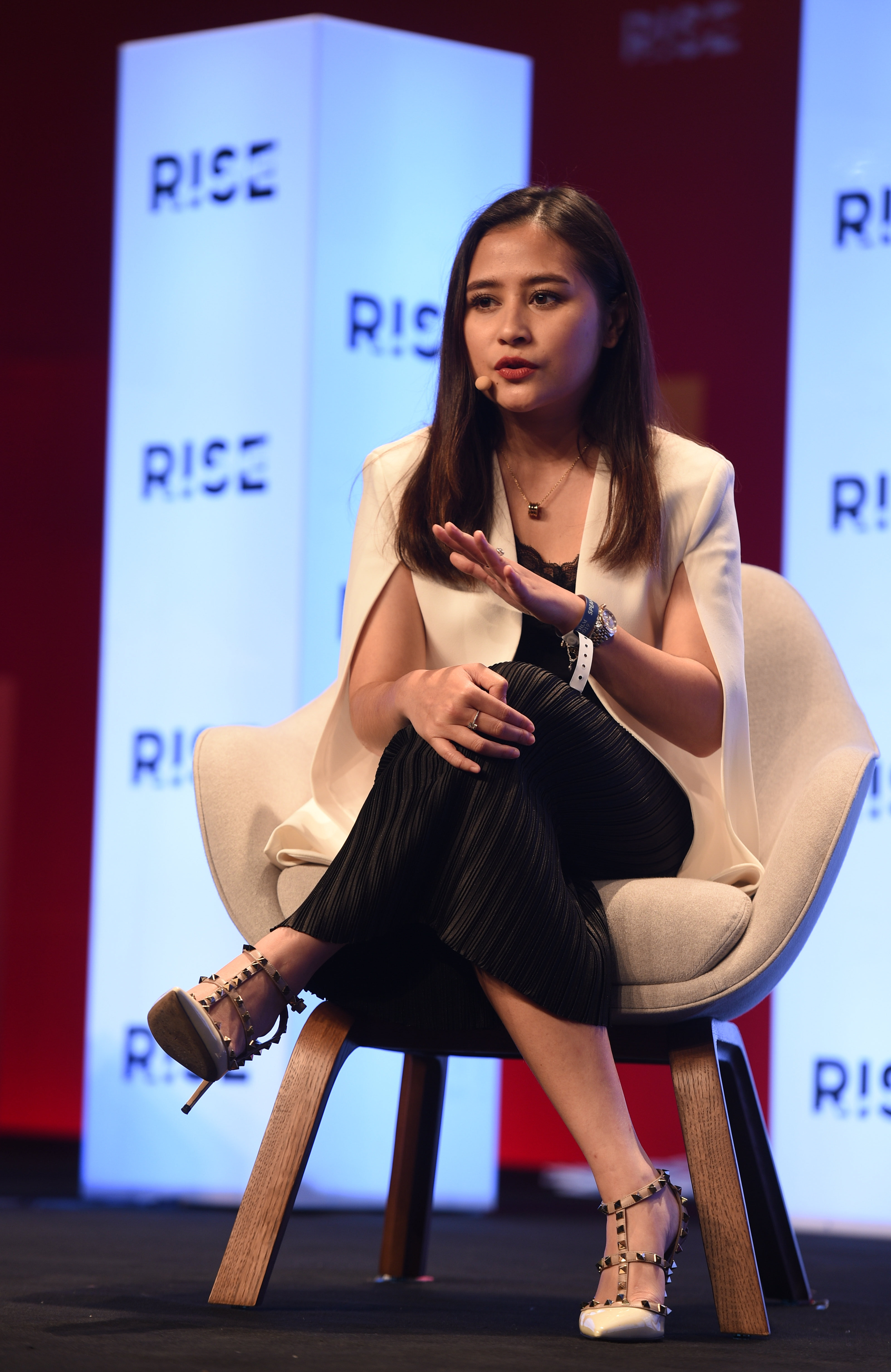
- Latuconsina at the RISE 2019.
- Born: Prilly Mahatei Latuconsina; 15 October 1996 (age 29); Tangerang, Banten, Indonesia
- Occupations: Actress; Singer; Host; Cook; Writer
- Years active: 2009–present
- Musical career
- Genre: Pop
- Instruments: Vocals, guitar
- Website: prillylatuconsina.net

Prilly Mahatei Latuconsina (born 15 October 1996) is an Indonesian actress, host, and singer. She is known for her leading roles in the television dramas Hanya Kamu, Monyet Cantik 2, and Ganteng Ganteng Serigala. She is an actress, known for Surat Untukmu (2016), Hangout (2016), Danur: I Can See Ghosts (2017), Danur 2: Maddah (2018), Honeymoon (2013), and La tahzan (2013).

== Early life ==
Latuconsina was born on 15 October 1996, in Tangerang, Banten. Her father is a Muslim Moluccan, native of Pelauw in Haruku Island of Maluku Province, and Pakistani, while her mother is Pandeglang and Sundanese. Latuconsina made her entertainment debut when she was the Master of Ceremonies at Koki Cilik.

== Career ==
She gained popularity through her appearance in the soap opera Get Married: The Series. In 2012, she starred in a television film. Her fame came when she played a sissy character with the greeting "OMG Hellooo" in the drama Ganteng Ganteng Serigala. For her acting in Ganteng Ganteng Serigala, Latuconsina received two awards: "Most Famous Actress" award at the 2014 SCTV Awards and "Favorite Actress" award at the 2015 Panasonic Gobel Awards.

Latuconsina is also a singer. Her debut single was "Fall In Love" in 2014. In 2015, she released a new single named "Sahabat Hidup". On 9 March 2016, the day when GMT (Total Solar Eclipse) was observed, Latuconsina released her debut album, Sahabat Hidup, which was only sold in KFC stores across Indonesia.

In 2015, she won the following awards: "Exist Celeb" at the 2015 Selebrita Awards, "Most Inbox Female Solo Singer" and "Most Inbox Guest Host" at the 2015 Inbox Awards, and "Most Exist Social Media Celebrity".

== Discography ==
=== Studio album ===
- Sahabat Hidup (2016)

=== Singles ===
Year	Title	Album	Label
2014	"Fall In Love"	Sahabat Hidup	Le Moesik Revole
2015	"Sahabat Hidup"	Sahabat Hidup	Le Moesik Revole
2015	Itu Aku Dulu		Le Moesik Revole
2016	Hidup Hanya Sekali	Sahabat Hidup	Le Moesik Revole
2016	Kau Berubah	Sahabat Hidup	Le Moesik Revole
2016	Rasa Ini	Sahabat Hidup	Le Moesik Revole
2016	Sebatas Teman Tanpa Kepastian	Sahabat Hidup	Le Moesik Revole
2016	Teman Tapi Mesra	Sahabat Hidup	Le Moesik Revole
2020	Shooting Stars (with Selva)	Shooting Stars	Spinnin' Records

== Filmography ==
=== Film ===
Year	Title	Role	Notes
2013	Honeymoon	Kania	Supporting role
2013	La Tahzan	Neneng	Supporting role
2016	Surat Untukmu	Gendis	Lead role Won – 2016 I-Cinema Awards for Favorite Newcomer Role
2016	Hangout	Prilly	Lead role
2017	Danur	Risa Saraswati	Lead role
2018	Danur 2 – Maddah	Risa Saraswati	Lead role
2018	Ananta	Risa Saraswati	Lead role
2018	Rasuk	Risa Saraswati	Lead role
2018	Asih	Risa Saraswati	Lead role
2018	Silam	Risa Saraswati	Lead role
2019	Danur 3 – Sunyaruri	Risa Saraswati	Lead role
2019	Matt and Mou	Mouretta	Lead role
2020	Rasuk 2	Risa Saraswati	Lead role
2023	Andragogy	Tita	

=== Television ===
Year	Title	Role	Notes	Network
2010	Get Married The Series	Josephira/Vira	Supporting role	SCTV
2013	Pinky Boy	Jinny	Supporting role	Indosiar
2013	Hanya Kamu	Yumi	Supporting role	RCTI
2013	Hanya Kamu 2	Yumi	Supporting role	RCTI
2013	Monyet Cantik 2	Dinda	Lead role	SCTV
2014	Get Married The Series 2	Sofi	Supporting role	SCTV
2014	Ganteng Ganteng Serigala	Sissy	Lead role Won — 2014 SCTV Awards for Famous Actress; Won — 2015 Panasonic Gobel Awards for Favorite Actress	SCTV
2015	Samson dan Dahlia	Prilly	Guest star	SCTV
2015	Tarzan dan Zaenab	Prilly	Guest star	SCTV
2015	Ganteng Ganteng Serigala Season 2	Sisi	Lead role	SCTV
2015	Ganteng Ganteng Serigala Returns	Prilly	Lead role Won — 2015 SCTV Awards for Famous Actress; Won — 2016 Panasonic Gobel Awards for Favorite Actress; Won — 2016 Indonesian Television Awards for Most Popular Actress	SCTV
2017	Bawang Merah Bawang Putih	Bawang Putih	Lead Role; Won — 2017 Panasonic Gobel Awards for Favorite Actress	Trans TV

=== Television film ===
Year	Title	Role	Notes
	Petualangan Naga Topong		
	Pangeran Arya dan Kuda Terbang		
	Mata Air Surga		
	Super Hiro Kocak		
	Purple Love		
2011	Gonzalez; Ada Garuda di Dadaku		
2012	Malu-Malu Mau	Messy	Supporting role
2012	Guru Gue Jago Kungfu	Sarah	Supporting role
2012	No Woman No Cry	Kalia' sister	Supporting role
2013	Ketika Rangga Jatuh Cinta	Cinta	Lead role
2013	Hati Dengki Anak Kandung		
2016	Cinta Asli Orang Kaya Palsu	Risa	Lead role
2016	Warna Warni Cinta penjual Ikan Hias	Mimi	Lead role
2016	Betapa Aku Mencintaimu	Agatha	Lead role
2016	Ratu Bawel vs Raja Bokis	Dina	Lead role
2017	Jodohku Pangeran Masa Lalu	Juleha	Lead role

== Books ==
- Prilly Latuconsina (2017). 5 Detik dan Rasa Rindu (5 seconds and Nostalgia). Published February 2017 by Mizan Publishing.

== Awards and nominations ==
Year	Awards	Category	Recipients	Result
2014	Inbox Awards	Most Inbox Guest Host	Prilly Latuconsina	Nominated
2014	SCTV Awards	Most Favorite Social Media Artist	Prilly Latuconsina	Won
2014	SCTV Awards	Famous Actress	Ganteng-Ganteng Serigala	Won
2014	Bintang RPTI Awards	Favorite Teenage Actress	Prilly Latuconsina	Won
2014	Yahoo! Celebrity Awards	Teenage Idol Girl	Prilly Latuconsina	Won
2015	Infotainment Awards	Most Lure Female Celebrity	Prilly Latuconsina	Nominated
2015	Infotainment Awards	Most Awaited Celebrity Appearance	Prilly Latuconsina	Nominated
2015	Infotainment Awards	Celebrity of the Year	Prilly Latuconsina	Nominated
2015	Infotainment Awards	Most Exist Social Media Celebrity	Prilly Latuconsina	Won
2015	Infotainment Awards	Most Romantic Celebrity Couple	Aliando Syarief & Prilly Latuconsina	Won
2015	SCTV Music Awards	Most Famous Newcomer	Prilly Latuconsina	Nominated
2015	Fokus Selebriti Awards	Female Hits Celebrity	Prilly Latuconsina	Won
2015	Panasonic Gobel Awards	Favorite Actress	Ganteng-Ganteng Serigala	Won
2015	Nickelodeon Indonesia Kids' Choice Awards	Favorite Actress	Prilly Latuconsina	Nominated
2015	Selebrita Awards	Exist Celeb	Prilly Latuconsina	Won
2015	Selebrita Awards	Most Celeb Newcomer	Prilly Latuconsina	Nominated
2015	Inbox Awards	Most Inbox Female Solo Singer	Prilly Latuconsina	Won
2015	Inbox Awards	Most Inbox Guest Host	Prilly Latuconsina	Won
2015	Inbox Awards	Most Inbox Darling Social Media Artist	Prilly Latuconsina	Nominated
2015	SCTV Awards	Famous Actress	Ganteng-Ganteng Serigala Returns	Won
2016	Infotainment Awards	Celebrity of the Year	Prilly Latuconsina	Nominated
2016	SCTV Music Awards	Most Famous Female Solo Singer	Prilly Latuconsina	Nominated
2016	Socmed Awards	Celeb Gram Female	Prilly Latuconsina	Nominated
2016	Nickelodeon Indonesia Kids' Choice Awards	Favorite Actress	Prilly Latuconsina	Nominated
2016	Nickelodeon Indonesia Kids' Choice Awards	Favorite Television Couple	Aliando Syarief & Prilly Latuconsina	Nominated
2016	Indonesian Television Awards	Most Popular Actress	Prilly Latuconsina	Won
2016	Inbox Awards	Most Inbox Female Solo Singer	Prilly Latuconsina	Nominated
2016	Inbox Awards	Most Inbox Guest Host	Prilly Latuconsina	Won
2016	Inbox Awards	Most Inbox Fanbase	Prillyvers	Nominated
2016	Panasonic Gobel Awards	Favorite Actress	Betapa Aku Mencintaimu	Won
2016	Insert Awards	Fit and Fabulous Female Celebrity	Prilly Latuconsina	Won
2016	Indonesian Social Media Awards	Female Celeb Facebook	Prilly Latuconsina	Won
2016	Indonesian Social Media Awards	Female Celeb Twitter	Prilly Latuconsina	Nominated
2017	Seleb On News Awards	Most Social Media Celeb	Prilly Latuconsina	Won
2017	Indonesian Box Office Movie Awards	Best Female Leading Role	Hangout	Nominated
2017	Panasonic Gobel Awards	Favorite Actress	BMBP	Won
