= Cinta Mati =

Indonesian thriller crime television series

- Genre: Thriller; Drama; Crime
- Created by: Rocky Soraya
- Screenplay by: Riheam Junianti
- Directed by: Daniel Rifki
- Starring: Aisyah Aqilah; Aliando Syarief; Richelle Skornicki; Cantika Putri; Jeremy Thomas; Mona Ratuliu; Ilona Cecilia Budiman
- Composer: Joseph S. Djafar
- Country of origin: Indonesia
- Original language: Indonesian
- No. of seasons: 1
- No. of episodes: 10

Production
- Executive producer: Ram Soraya
- Producer: Rocky Soraya
- Editor: Gita Miaji
- Camera setup: Multi-camera
- Production company: Hitmaker Studios

Original release
- Network: WeTV
- Release: 31 January – 5 April 2025

Cinta Mati (transl. Obsessed) is an Indonesian thriller crime television series produced by Hitmaker Studios which aired from 31 January 2025 to 5 April 2025 on WeTV. It starred Aisyah Aqilah, Aliando Syarief and Richelle Skornicki.

== Plot ==
Aleya (Aisyah Aqilah), a talented ballet student, dreams of studying ballet in America and becoming a professional ballet dancer.

Aleya grew up in a seemingly perfect family. Her father is a renowned doctor but overprotective of his only daughter.

On the other hand, Aleya feels her father prioritizes his patients. This creates a gap and an empty space between the two.

Aleya feels she lives her days filled with restrictions from her father. Amidst these days filled with rules, Aleya meets Bara (Aliando Syarief), a man who helps her when she's trapped in an elevator.

Their subsequent chance encounters deepen their relationship. Of course, Aleya's love doesn't receive the blessing of her father and her friends.

Determined to defend her love, Aleya makes a choice that leads her down a dangerous path.

== Cast ==
- Aisyah Aqilah as Aleya Anjani Adhitama
- Aliando Syarief as Bara Bimasena
- Richelle Skornicki as Chelsea
- Cantika Putri Kirana as Tania Gayatri
- Jeremy Thomas as dr. Reyhan
- Samudra Taylor as Gavin Janendra
- Mahdy Reza as Leo Mardika
- Mona Ratuliu as Dinna
- Shan Ryadi as Ferdi
- Mira Asmara as Mila
- Uwie Jasmine as ibu Tania
- Irene Librawati as ibu Gavin
- Ferdian Ariyadi as ayah Gavin
- Rommy Sulastyo as Radja
- Barry Prabu as Polisi
- Ivan Leonardy as Polisi
- Ilona Cecilia Budiman as Niken
- Ika Corlote as Sari
- Rini Ratu as kakak Reyhan
- Kartika Sari Daud as Ibu Reyhan

== Production ==
=== Casting ===
Aliando Syarief was confirmed to play Bara. For the role of Bara, Aliando lost 12 kilograms to get fit. Aisyah Aqilah were confirmed to portray Aleya. Jeremy Thomas were reportedly to play dr. Reyhan.
