= Lengkong incident =

1946 incident

- Part of the Indonesian National Revolution
Date	25 January 1946
Location	Lengkong, Tangerang, Banten
Result	Japanese victory

Belligerents
Indonesia	Japan

Commanders and leaders
(Indonesia) Major Daan Mogot †	

Strength
Cadets and officers	Local garrison

Casualties and losses
36 killed	Unknown

The Lengkong incident was an incident that occurred on 25 January 1946, where cadets from the newly formed Indonesian Military Academy and Japanese soldiers unexpectedly engaged in combat.

== Events ==
In the afternoon of 25 January 1946, a group of newly enrolled Indonesian Military Academy cadets in Tangerang led by Major Daan Mogot went to a Japanese base in Lengkong, in what is today South Tangerang, in order to discuss disarmament of the Japanese troops and acquire their weapons. The negotiations, which began with the transfer of some Gurkha prisoners of war, initially went well and the cadets began collecting the weapons, when a shot was fired – the culprit was unknown, with an account describing one of the Gurkhas having accidentally fired the weapon and another describing one of the cadets' weapons firing accidentally.

After the shot, Japanese soldiers retook the seized weapons and began attacking the cadets. In the ensuing shootout, 33 cadets and 3 of their officers, including Daan Mogot, were killed. The Indonesian Army later threatened to send in soldiers to Lengkong, prompting the Japanese garrison to surrender.

== Aftermath ==
The dead cadets and officers were buried in a nearby forest, though they were later reburied on a plot of land near Tangerang's regimental headquarters, and the burial site is today known as the Cadet Heroes' Cemetery (Indonesian: Taman Makam Pahlawan Taruna). Among the dead were brothers Soebianto and Soejono Djojohadikusumo, would-be uncles and namesake of eighth President of Indonesia Prabowo Subianto and his brother Hashim Sujono Djojohadikusumo respectively. A monument was erected at the site of the incident in 1993, and in 2005 Army Chief of Staff Ryamizard Ryacudu set 25 January, the date of the incident, as a commemoration day for the Military Academy.
