= Koper (film) =

- Poster
- Directed by: Richard Oh
- Written by: Richard Oh
- Produced by: Richard Oh and Tati Gobel
- Starring: Anjasmara; Maya Hasan; Djenar Maesa Ayu
- Cinematography: Yadi Sugandhi
- Edited by: Wawan I. Wibowo
- Music by: Andi Riyanto
- Distributed by: Metafor Pictures
- Release date: 2006
- Running time: 123 minutes
- Country: Indonesia
- Language: Indonesian

Koper is a 2006 Indonesian film directed by Richard Oh, and starring Anjasmara, Maya Hasan, and Djenar Maesa Ayu.

== Plot ==
Yahya (Anjasmara), a working-class clerk employed in a government-run archives office, finds a suitcase on a roadside that is purported to contain stolen cash from a bank. Soon after finding the suitcase, Yahya's life changes drastically, starting from the fact that everybody is competing to take advantage of him and his newly established status as a 'wealthy man'. However, Yahya decides to safeguard the suitcase and leave it unopened, until a few incidents force him to re-think that decision.

== Cast ==
- Anjasmara
- Maya Hasan
- Djenar Maesa Ayu
- Djaduk Ferianto
- Virnie Ismail
- Arie Daginkz
- Enrico Soekarno
- Zen Hae
- Erry Isfandiari
- Eka Kurniawan
- Moammar Emka
- Barry Prima
- Niniek L. Karim
- Restu Sinaga
- Aristides Katopo
- Joko Anwar
- Ferry Salim
- Vebrianto Putra
- Albertien Endah
- Hendrik Carolus Warella
- Butet Kertaradjasa
- Indra Herlambang

== Festivals ==
Koper was screened in the ASEAN competition at the 2007 Bangkok International Film Festival, Lyon Asian Film Festival 2007, in competition, Singapore International Film Festival 2007, Official Selection.
