= Aini: Malaikat Tak Bersayap =

Indonesian drama television series

- Genre: Drama; Romantic; Fantasy
- Created by: Titin Suryani
- Screenplay by: Tisa T. S.; Team Verona
- Directed by: Anto Agam
- Starring: Nabila Zavira; Vladimir Rama; Suheil Fahmi Bisyir; Ofan Yusuf; Kathleen Carolyne; Aliando Syarief; Raslinna Rasidin; Fero Walandouw; Yessi Kenyang; Ichal Muhammad; Aditya Suryo; Ferdi Ali; Dharty Manullang; Sania Velova; Dini Vitri; Arie Dwi Andhika; Asriati
- Theme music composer: Cahyo Budiarto
- Opening theme: "Malaikat Tak Bersayap" by Sujar Band
- Ending theme: "Malaikat Tak Bersayap" by Sujar Band
- Composer: Arya Logam
- Country of origin: Indonesia
- Original language: Indonesian
- No. of seasons: 1
- No. of episodes: 232

Production
- Executive producer: Titin Suryani
- Producer: Titin Suryani
- Cinematography: Ripoel Hidayatullah
- Editors: Dikky Andrian; Oso Tiga Huruf; T.M. Salabim; Asrul; Heru
- Camera setup: Multi-camera
- Running time: 90 minutes
- Production company: Verona Pictures

Original release
- Network: ANTV
- Release: 2 September 2024 – 11 September 2025

Aini: Malaikat Tak Bersayap (transl. Aini: The Wingless Angel) is an Indonesian television series produced by Verona Pictures which aired from 2 September 2024 to 11 September 2025 on ANTV. It stars Nabila Zavira, Vladimir Rama, and Suheil Fahmi Bisyir.

== Plot ==
Aini, who disobeyed her mother and chose the wrong path in pursuit of wealth, was harmed by someone she trusted, resulting in her blindness. Unexpectedly, an angel named Zidan appeared as the embodiment of Aini's mother's sincere prayer for her protection. Thanks to Zidan, Aini regained her sight, and since then, she has possessed the vision of an "angel," able to sense the punishment and evil that may befall others.

== Cast ==
- Nabila Zavira as Aini Ramadhani
- Vladimir Rama as Malik Azzam
- Suheil Fahmi Bisyir as Ustad Fahri
- Ofan Yusuf as Dani Suryadi
- Kathleen Carolyne as Maya Puspita Sari
- Asriati as Nek Sampar
- Yully Fidya as Yeyen
- Mona Amelia as Iput
- Unknown as Pegi
- Heri Cahyono as Hj. Satiri
- Yessi Kenyang as Tutik
- Devina Mulyawati as Yuli
- Aliando Syarief as Attar
- Raslinna Rasidin as Nurul
- Fero Walandouw as Zidan
- Ichal Muhammad as Robby
- Imam Farisyah as Faldi
- Nadya Yasmien as Raina
- Lionil Hendrik as Gaspar
- Gessy Selvia as Aminah
- Aga Dirgantara as Alan
- Djihan Ranti as Ratna
- Gracia Marcilia as Kirana
- Zidni Adam as Arif
- Amel Alvi as Endah
- Elryan Carlen as Omar
- Sonya Pandarmawan as Hana
- Krishna Keitaro as Boy
- Soraya Rasyid as Mira
- Erlina Sutansyah as Sekar
- Faradina Tika as Wulan
- Oka Sugawa as Arman
- Angel Lisandi Putri as Aulia
- Rama Michael as Boris
- Nadya Shakira as Surti
- Sanjid Azero as Tejo
- Sean Hasyim as Heri
- Vinessa Inez as Yuna
- Unknown as Abi
- Unknown as Winda
- Annisa Hasim as Mirna
- Reiner Manopo as Bayu
- Rendy Septino as Fajar
- Novilia Annisa as Sari
- Yuwani as Ajeng
- Hans Hosman as Dodi
- Neezha Rais as Wiwik
- Unknown as Gita
- Jesyca Marlein as Karin
- Oce Permatasari as Wati
- Utha Saputra as Benny
- Unknown as Iis
- Meidian Maladi as Raka
- Arida Nuraini Primastiwi as Arum
- Farisha Fasha as Tina
- Unknown as Tari
- Elsya Herlina Syarief as Vera
- Lulu Zakaria as Hesti
- Yuna Anggraini as Lilis
- Unknown as Anwar
- Kia Poetri as Irma
- Neyrissa Arviana as Mila
- Nasywa Auliya as Resti
- Ananda George as Yongki
- Jasmine Elfira as Rena
- Reza Ari as Bimo
- Kathy Indera as Yanti
- Zidni Hakim as David
- Fath Bayyinah as Sarah
- Ersya Riri as Naya
- Gesya Shandy as Mutia
- Lindi Fitriyana as Yasmin
- Martha Ludiya as Mariani
- Unknown as Bagas
- Erwin Cortez as Asrul
- Eldania Zahra as Sonia
- Kiky Brata as Indah
- Disha Devina as Manda
- Sheilina Zelina as Widya
- Ika Kartika as Sukma
- Erwin Foreland as Dion
- Tiara Permata as Jeni
- Toddy Zilla as Wiro
- Kenzie Alghazali as Dika
- Vidya Ully as Yayah
- Cut Ashifa as Laila
- Jovita Karen as Adelia
- Essy Khadarisman as Maryam
- Rendy Kusdiana as Hilman
- Citra Pratami as Luna
- Baby Margaretha as Farida
- Daniel Leo as Mirza
- Endah Puspitasari as Ochi
- Devi Yanti as Sulastri
- Adelia Rasya as Asri
- Susan Asiani as Lestari
- Vania Bella as Bebby
- Joy Octaviano as Alfian
- Firstriana Aldila as Herlina
- Menco Hidayat as Rahmat
- Yusuf Bachtiar as Amir
- Fiona Fachru Nisa as Linda
- Rizal Akbar as Hartono
- Michella Adlen as Firda
- Ferdian Ariyadi as Rudi
- Eriez Assaidi as Wingga
- Unknown as Raya
- Metta Permadi as Alea
- Tengku Tezi as Dimas
- Tamee Irelly as Ririn
- Dwinda Ratna as Putri
- Erlandho Saputra as Anang
- Risma Nilawati as Seli
- Theresia Moreiza as Femi
- Dafina Jamasir as Dara
- Yeyen Lidya as Lilis
- Jabez Imanuel as Indra
- Raeshard Octaviansha as Darma
- Rendi Khrisna as Rendra
- Salsabilla Zahra as Karla
- Unknown as Narsih
- Zhi Alatas as Malina
- Unknown as Feby
- Bianchy Cheryl as Lily
- Wiwid Razak as Aida
- Dame Aning Melati as Riana
- Vera Maureen as Zaenab
- Ridwan Hendra as Rusli
- Keysha Angelica as Erika
- Dicki Jackson as Erwin
- Yogie Tan as Yanto
- Valeria Stahl Kaliey as Mia
- Bryan Gysa as Okim
- Cerelia Raissa as Aghni
- Amelia Marda as Milly
- Billa Berliana as Hana
- Diaz Ardiawan as Ajie
- Kris Anjar as Beno
- Anggie Merdianti as Diah
- Tiansyah Panjaitan as Faris
- Resky Karamu as Yudi
- Yugo Avaero as Toni
- Lina Fadilah as Atun
- Rizky Sabath as Reza
- Rifa Ivonya as Halda
- Baby Gracia as Meli
- Rio Destha as Ridwan
- Ricky Perdana as Tama
- Chacha Amanda as Minten
- Guntur Nugraha as Heru
- Melsy Delsini as Ranti
- Madin Pratama as Teguh
- Boy Harsya as Imam
- Hami Diah as Daras
- Indrayana as Asih
- Unknown as Mirah
- Ferry Sahertian as Jarwo
- Cornel Nadeak as Zawin
- Anastasia Nawa as Mita
- Agung Saga as Eman
- Revi Mariska as Riska
- Yogi Tama as Tegar
- Surya Al Fatah as Mamat
- Fredy Amin as Bambang
- Djoko Syarief as Yono
- Trianita Agustin as Jenab
- Febry Khey as Tika
- Alvin as Jufar
- Dini Hanipahm as Debby
- Ayu Permatasari as Dina
- Rosnita Putri as Sisi
- Kenya Nindia Elsa as Meta
- Aura Selsha as Dini
- Niniek Arum as Inem
- Sivi Maynika as Ana
- Arfan Afif as Asroni
- Cut Fitria as Sulis
- Cinta Dewi as Mika
- Indra Rooney as Andi
- Nadia Audreya as Susan
- Lolly Love as Eha
- Gina Naureen as Rosmiati
- Maharany Asmara Dewi as Yati
- Barry Prabu as Yudi
- Farhan Petterson as Warto
- Fahira Thalib as Puji
- Epy Basuki as Tely
- Audia Shavira as Renata
- Rian Rizky as Rafi
- Sutan Simatupang as Ki Uhud
- Nickma Fadhil as Hanum
- Gabryan Leonard as Adi
- Nanda Maouri as Anisa
- Zack Arsene as Lionel
- Shakira Sheldrick as Lola
- Larassati Kusnandar as Fani
- Yannez Hendrawan as Adnan
- Fajar Gomez as Dirga
- Irfan Yanuar as Ardi
- Bella Virgi as Dewi Asmara
- Elza Agustine as Mela
- Renny Novita as Kartini
- Kartika Sari Daud as Wiwik
- Ade Setiawan as Diken
- Kevin Haichal as Ihsan
- Alfian Phang as Edo
- Erman Sendja as Nizam
- Andrew Andika as Erwin
- Jihad Alfurqon as Oyok
- Gavrilovich Hanzel as Abe
- Nadya Ulya as Puspa
- Mahisa Aulia Dinsi as Umar
- Sylvia Damayanti as Lilis
- Cahyary Nagara as Hasan
- Ega Olivia as Laili
- Aditya Suryo as Davin
- Jihan Sherlyna as Elga
- Andre Geovano as Jamal
- Shezy Idris as Mustika
- Balqis Carolien as Dara
- Sheila Alexander as Sari
- Via Octora as Listi
- Rania Mas'ad as Lila
- Jerio Jeffry as Ki Sutejo
- Lilis Suganda as Maryam
- Duway as Wajid
- Wieshely Brown as Catur
- Riana Chalid as Ulfah
- Haydar Ozim as Andre
- Kikky Dradjat Martha as Wiro
- Diana Alodie as Cica
- Ferdi Ali as Hamdan
- Dita Amanda as Nara
- Tania Qumsoani as Sari
- Anastasia Indri as Laila
- Dewi Anjani as Saodah
- Bayu Adi Nugroho as Tomi
- Indi Syahputra as Husin
- Putri Annisa Rahmi as Rani
- Anof Zulfania as Ginah
- Wan Afox as Agung
- Zahra Qareen as Tika
- Leonardy Kusuma as Rengga
- Yusuf Omar as Dastan
- Yogash Bath as Arif
- Dharty Manullang as Nunung
- Ida Laviany as Pita
- Mikhayla Santoso as Zahra
- Sania Velova as Warsih
- Youna Irmariyanti as Nyi Bubrah
- Dini Vitri as Atun
- Ziggy Alghany as Ardi
- Arie Dwi Andhika as Ujang
- Helsa Dzakira Aulia as Nisa

== Episode ==
Eps	Title	Release date
2	Raina Before 40 Days	3-9-2024
3	My Cousin Is Death	4-9-2024
4	The Fake Charms of Dangdut Singers	5-9-2024
5	Toxic Husband Who Tortured Wife Tragically Burns	6-9-2024
6	The Earth Hates the Grave That Crushes It	9-9-2024
7	Rice Grains that Deliver Death	10-9-2024
8	Submerget in the Land of Merciless Graves	11-9-2024
9	Starting with Pesugihan Ending in Misery	12-9-2024
10	Stealing Funds from the Prayer Room Will Reap Sin	13-9-2024
11	Mother's Love Throughout Betrayal	16-9-2024
12	Begging with Lies Will Bring Disaster	17-9-2024
13	Forgotten Devotion Before Death	18-9-2024
14	Dragged By Online Gambling Addiction Until the End of His Life	19-9-2024
15	False Hopes for the Holy Land	20-9-2024
16	Poisonous Words Accumulate Sins	23-4-2024
17	Stinginess with wealth brings suffering	24-9-2024
18	Caugh in Invisible Beauty	25-9-2024
19	Death-Destroying Satay Fan	26-9-2024
20	Conterfeiter of Refillable Water Drowns in Greed	27-9-2024
21	Wealth-Stealing Massage Therapist	30-9-2024
22	Monkey Servant Ends in Disaster	1-10-2024
23	Deadly Crushed Chicken	2-10-2024
24	The Preacher's Child Causes Unrest	3-10-2024
25	Fake Skincare Tricked	4-10-2024
26	Trapped in the Potion of a Seductive Herbalist	7-10-2024
27	The Vicious Slander of Ojol	8-10-2024
28	The wealth of the pig Ngepet is in decline and reigns supreme	9-10-2024
29	Buyer Binding Sutil	10-10-2024
30	Shit Rope to Boost Sales	11-10-2024
31		14-10-2024
32		16-10-2024
33		17-10-2024
34		18-10-2024
35	21-10-2024	
36	22-10-2024	
37	23-10-2024	
38	25-10-2024	
39	28-10-2024	
40	30-10-2024	
41		1-11-2024
42		4-11-2024
43		5-11-2024
44		7-11-2024
45	Trapped in the Unsettling Death Snare of Kolor Ijo	8-11-2024
46	The Trickery of Forbidden Medicine	
47	Behind the Darkness of Death, Ghost Robbers	
48	Behind the Misleading Inheritance of Knowledge	
49	White Crocodile Arisan	
50	Caugh in a sinden's Song of Love	
51	The Gendam Trick of Fake Electronics Repairmen	
52	The Secret Behind Another World's Angkringan	
53	The Price of a Contract in Kandang Bubrah	
54	A Bowl of Chicken Noodles Brings Disaster	
55	Seductive Woman's Diamond Insert	
56	Vegetable Middlemen's Fraud Ends in Destruction	
57	The Con Artist ij a Comatose State	
58	A Mixture of Lies in a Cup of Coffee	
59	The Mystery of the Skewer House	
60	Magic Money Makes the Future Disappear	
61	Baker with Daster Soaked Dress as a Sales Booster	
62	Trapped by the Snake Demon Who Dwells in an Old Well	
63	The Greed of the Monkey-Workshipling Vegetable Seller	
64	The Scen of Sin Behind the Cunning Siomay Sellers	
65	Seduce Used Cooking Oil Fraudsters	
66	Retail Gasoline Adulterator	
67	The Red Jelangkung's Love Deception	
68	Hanging a Soulmate to Satisfy Love Revenge	
69	Pawn Shop Fraud	
70	The Dark Secret of Naughty Lottery Sellers	
71	Wijaya Flowers, the Best-Selling Cobek for Rujak Cingur	
72	Aqiqah Goat Seller's Tricks	
73	Behind the Terror of the Theft of Condolence Money	
74	New Year's Holiday Tragedy at the Forest Villa	
75	Iridescent on the Dusk Horizon of the Forbidden Forest	
76	There's Danur in a Glass of Viral Fruit Ice	
77	Monkey Tail to Boost Barbershop Sales	
78	Forbidden Wrapped in Hidden Revenge	
79	Social Assistance Rice Is Rotten and Infested with Weevils	
80	The Tofu Merchant's Rotten Game	
81	Toxic Boss Cheats on Employees' Salaries	
82	The Despicable and Cunning Public Transport Boss	
83	Wealth Attracting Mask	
84	Betawi Soto Stall Dispute	
85	Illegal Parking Attendant Disturbs Residents	
86	The Legacy of Knowledge That Brings Disaster	
87	The Dark Secret of Fried Food Vendors	
88	Greedy Egg Traders Justify Any Means	
89	Rituals Behind a Junk Cart	
90	Behind the Cloak of a Fake Ustaz	
91	The Terror of the Ngepet Pig Comes Again	3-2-2025
92	Robbers Disguised as Key Duplicators	4-2-2025
93	The Laundry Service's Trick	5-2-2025
94	The Bitter Reward of A Tuyul Caretaker	10-2-2025
95	Cruel Stepmother Sowers Suffering	11-2-2025
96	Cheating by Bulk Meat Sausage Traders	12-2-2025
97	Caught in the Evil Mother's Seduction	15-2-2025
98	Cunning Retailer Causes Melon Gas to Explode	17-2-2025
99	A Lie in Every Drop of Cow's Milk	18-2-2025
100	Deception of a Husband and Mother-in-Law	20-2-2025
101	The Greed of Counterfeit Pempek Sellers is Dangerous	21-2-2025
102	Heaven is no Longer Under the Soloes of Mother's feet	23-2-2025
103	The Fake Charm of the Neon Green Ladle	24-2-2025
104	The Paylater and Pinjol Traps That Ensnare Citizens	26-2-2025
105	Repentance of Unjust Date Traders Who Are Afraid of Being Stoned	27-2-2025
106	When a Mother's Faith Is Tested by Her Own Child	28-2-2025
107	Deadly Takjil With Artificial Coloring	1-3-2025
108	Greedy Catering Profiteers End in Disaster	2-3-2025
109	Bukber Ends in CLBK	3-3-2025
110	Fake Firecrackers Claim Victims	4-3-2025
111	The Greedy Duo Who Embezzled Public Funds Ended in Disaster	6-3-2025
112	Untrustworthy Grocery Traders	7-3-2025
113	The Sweeper with a Dirty Heart	8-3-2025
114	Fooled by Glonggongan Beef Seller	9-3-2025
115	Love Fraudulent Under the Guise of Online Taaruf	10-3-2025
116	Jealousy of the Cake Seller with Lice	11-3-2025
117	Strict Penalties for Cunning Gasoline Adulterators	12-3-2025
118	Deceitful and Fraudulent Loans	14-3-2025
119	Revenge for Greedy Bosses Who Force Employees to Work Continuously	18-3-2025
120	The Extortionist Busker	19-3-2025
121	Body Melted Due to Selling Fake Gold	20-3-2025
122	The Greedy Tom-Guarding Couple	21-3-2025
123	The Secret of the Infallible Maids Who Destroy Households	23-3-2025
124	Counterfeit Money Exchange Tragedy	24-3-2025
125	Source of Catastrophe Beauty Salon	26-3-2025
126	Poisoned Gift Behind the Parcel	27-3-2025
127	The Homewrecker's Ambition to Become a Legal Wife	28-3-2025
128	The Dangdut Cart That Brings Disaster	2-4-2025
129	Beauty Products Full of Deceptions End Tragically	3-4-2025
130	Delicious Seblak that Takes Life	4-4-2025
131	For Profit, Rotten Chicken Transformed into Food	8-4-2025
132	Genderuwo Marriage for Wealth	9-4-2025
133	Donuts That Bring Death's Fortune	10-4-2025
134	Sacred Mirror of the Death Reaper	11-4-2025
135	Free Meals Lead to Tragic End For Residents	12-4-2025
136	Segoro Pitu: Instant Fortune, Painful Reward	14-4-2025
137	The Reception Behind the Sacred Healing Stone	15-4-2025
138	The Deadly Spice Behind the Popularity of Pecel lele Stalls	16-4-2025
139	Travel Horse Panoleh Caller Of Illegal Money	17-4-2025
140	Fake Doctors Cost Lives	21-4-2025
141	Fresh Fish Seller Full of Envy	22-4-2025
142	Delicious Satay Made with Charcoal from the Grave	23-4-2025
143	Attracting the Village Head with a Jaran Goyang Dance, Resident's Lives Were Lost	24-4-2025
144	A Pair of Shoes Leads Steps Into the Dark Valley	25-4-2025
145	The Porridge Seller Rises in Status Because He Uses Forbidden Knowledge	26-4-2025
146	Sacred Dolls: Treasures Come Lives Go Away	28-4-2025
147	Relationships Fail Refenge Retaliates	29-4-2025
148	Money Multiplier in Alliance with the Other World	30-4-2025
149	The Charm of a Carpenter Using the Goddess of Love's Charm	1-5-2025
150	For the Sake of a Successfull Tempeh Business, the Mother-in-Law Sacrificed Her Daughter-in-Law as a Sales Boost	5-5-2025
151	Ojek Drivers Get Rich Through Misguided Ways	6-5-2025
152	The Secret Spices for Delicious Rawon, From The Snake Ghost	8-5-2025
153	Investing in Ghost Gold Leads to Death	12-5-2025
154	Sacret Hair Talisman Brings Disaster	13-5-2025
155	Eight Nail Implant to Deliver Death	14-5-2025
156	Fighting Over Heritage Land Becomes a Field of Revenge	15-5-2025
157	Tiger Fang Talisman That Preys on Citizens	19-5-2025
158	Fake Slimming Drugs Bring Disaster	20-5-2025
159	Downloading Souls For Merchandise Selling One's Life to the Underworld	21-5-2025
160	The Monkey Ghost Behind the Chicken Sempol Cart	22-5-2025
161	The Karma of Batagor Sellers is Invisible	26-5-2025
162	Sacred Friday Kliwon	27-5-2025
163	Life-Sucking Tofu Factory	2-6-2025
164	Tuyul Comes, Malang Residents, Savings Lost	3-6-2025
165	Greedy Kebab Traders Spread Disaster	6-6-2025
166	The Mystical Charm of Bahu Laweyan the Bringer of Disaster	9-6-2025
167	Ghost Melon: Wealth Through Illegal Paths	11-6-2025
168	Allied with an Imitation White Crocodile	12-6-2025
169	Buto Ijo Guardian of the Meatball Bowl	13-6-2025
170	Breast milk is repaid with a life sacrifice	16-6-2025
171	ART Victim of Employer's Greed	17-6-2025
172	Holy Blood Ritual: Divide and Conquer Here and There	18-6-2025
173	Two-Headed Snake That Sucks Lives	19-6-2025
174	The Gold of Banaspati Wealth	23-6-2025
175	The Deadly Charm of the Snake-Haired Woman	24-6-2025
176	The Centipede Demon's Promise on the First Night of Suro	25-6-2025
177	The Lampor That Picks Up Life	27-6-2025
178	The Tune of the Deadly Dragon Drum by a Dangdut Singer	30-6-2025
179	White Tiger Demon's Magic Claw	2-7-2025
180	The Death Trap of Nyi Guardian of the Dewandaru Tree	3-7-2025
181	Trapped in a Ghost Village with No Way Home	4-7-2025
182	The Raven Witch from Another World	7-7-2025
183	Guardian of the Sacred Jar	8-7-2025
184	Bat Demon Terror	9-7-2025
185	The Secret of Buto Ijo and the Forbidden Forest	10-7-2025
186	The Terror of the Fanged Tuyul Sucking the Wealth of the People	11-7-2025
187	Grandpa Cangkul & Grandma Dipper: The Death-Bringing Couple	14-7-2025
188	Follower of the Panther Ghost Who Mislead the People	15-7-2025
189	The Secret of the Illegal Indonesian Migrant Worker Agent, the Black Horse of Panoleh	16-7-2025
190	Tomato Sauce for Wealth from Spider Ghosts	17-7-2025
191	The Magical Phone Chall From The Life-Taking Wolf	18-7-2025
192	Gudeg Kembang Setaman	19-7-2025
193	Terrorizing Citizens by a Face-Stealing Figure	21-7-2025
194	Mermaid Sucking Human Souls	22-7-2025
195	Nyai Rumi: Guardian of Mirrors From Another World	23-7-2025
196	Ritual Magic Under the Guise of Hereditary Myths	24-7-2025
197	The Fiery-Haired Demon and the Secret of the Satay Stall's Succes	25-7-2025
198	Insurance Salesman Seeking Victims of Citizens	26-7-2025
199	Golden Cucumber and the Disaster of the Pesugihan Garden	28-7-2025
200	A Magical Babysitter's agreement to Get Rich Quick	29-7-2025
201	Banana Chips Brand Siluman Kingkong Sells Like Hotcakes	30-7-2025
202	Soleh's future Husband is full of tricks	31-7-2025
203	Adopted Child From the Supernatural World	4-8-2025
204	The Werewolf Guards the Land of Heritage	5-8-2025
205	Tragically Ending in Alliance With the Mystical Bee	6-8-2025
206	The Trick of the Sound Horeg Owner the Death Deliverer	7-8-2025
207	The Alluring Herbal Medicine of Nyi Blorong	8-8-2025
208	Window's Hole in the Cemetery	9-8-2025
209	Viral Donuts Sprinkled with White Monkey Fur	11-8-2025
210	Wealth Attracting Nine-Tailed Fox	12-8-2025
211	Forbidden Food of Odading Susuk Pemikat	13-8-2025
212	Sacret Gathering from Danyang Randu Bolong	14-8-2025
213	The Magical Testament of the Woman in the Red Dress	15-8-2025
214	Haunted Gatel the Boundary of the Supernatural Realm	16-8-2025
215	The Terror of Krincing Delman the Former Village Head	18-8-2025
216	The Rise of the Crawling Sister in a Terrifying Night	19-8-2025
217	The Boy of The Wind Who Collects Lives	20-8-2025
218	The Pesugihan Boss: Trading His Underlings for a Pig	21-8-2025
219	The Fire Scooter of the Revenge	22-8-2025
220	The Deadly Charm of Hair from the Inhabitants of the Graveyard	23-8-2025
221	Caugh by a Magical Frog that Produces Fake Gold	25-8-2025
222	Death Bike That Takes Lives	26-8-2025
223	Mysterious Shape-Changing Painting	27-8-2025
224	Suddenly Powerfull When Rising From the Grave	28-8-2025
225	Village Motorcycle Taxi Gets a Lucky Break	29-8-2025
226	The Reward of the Poison-Mouthed Slander Spreader	30-8-2025
227	The Earthenware Piggy Bank That Sucks Human Souls	1-9-2025
228	The Return of the Mother of the Cursed Covenant	2-9-2025
229	The Magic Hoe to Boost Sales From the Earth	4-9-2025
230	Sundari: Bride From the Grave	7-9-2025
231	Duel of the Death-Spreading Queen	10-9-2025
232	The Master-Eating Magic Meatball	11-9-2025

== Production ==
=== Development ===
Initially, the series had limited episodes but was extended.

=== Casting ===
Nabila Zavira was roped for the role of Aini Ramadhani. Fero Walandouw to play the role of Zidan. In late December 2024, Walandouw quit the show and was replace by Attar Aliando Syarief. In March 2025, Suheil Fahmi Bisyir was cast as Ustad Fahri special Ramadan.
