= 2013 SCTV Awards =

Indonesian television awards

- Date: November 29, 2014
- Location: JIEXPO Hall D2, Kemayoran, North Jakarta
- Hosted by: Andhika Pratama; Gading Marten; Senandung Nacita

Television/radio coverage
- Network: SCTV

The 2013 SCTV Awards honored the popular in Indonesian television program and music. The ceremony award ceremony held at the JIEXPO Hall D2 in Kemayoran, North Jakarta, on November 29, 2013 and was broadcast on SCTV. It was hosted by Andhika Pratama, Gading Marten, and Senandung Nacita. The ceremony awards was attended by top artists, such as Noah, Syahrini, Afgan, Indah Dewi Pertiwi, Cherrybelle, SM*SH, Cakra Khan, Zaskia Gotik, Wali, and Armada.

== Winners and nominees ==
The nominees were announced on November 4, 2013. The winners are listed on boldface.

Most Famous Leading Actor	Most Famous Leading Actress
**Eza Gionino – Cinta Yang Sama**; Adipati Dolken – Get Married the Series 2; Andhika Pratama – 3 Semrpul Mengejar Surga; Dimas Anggara – Diam-Diam Suka; Rizky Nazar – Pesantren & Rock 'N Roll Season 3	**Dinda Kirana – Pesantren & Rock 'N Roll Season 3**; Febby Rastanty – Diam-Diam Suka; Michelle Ziudith – Cinta Yang Sama; Tika Bravani – Bidadari-Bdadari Surga; Zsa Zsa Utari – Si Cemong
Most Famous Supporting Actor	Most Famous Supporting Actress
**Chris Laurent – Bidadari-Bdadari Surga**; Aldi Taher – Emak Ijah Pengen Ke Mekah; Fandy Christian – Bidadari-Bdadari Surga; Rizky Alatas – Pesantren & Rock 'N Roll Season 3; Ucup Nirin – Emak Ijah Pengen Ke Mekah	**Eriska Reinisa – 3 Semprul Mengejar Surga**; Adzana Bing Slamet – Putih Abu-Abu 2; Meriam Bellina – Bidadari-Bdadari Surga; Sahila Hisyam – 3 Semprul Megejar Surga; Shinta Muin – Emak Ijah Pengen Ke Mekah
Most Famous Singer	Most Famous Group Band
**Syahrini**; Afgan; Agnes Monica; Cakra Khan; Raisa	**Noah**; Geisha; Setia Band; Ungu; Wali
Most Famous Boyband/Girlband	Most Famous Presenter
**Coboy Junior**; Blink; Cherrybelle; JKT48; SM*SH	**Andhika Pratama**; Farid Reza; Gading Marten; Narji Cagur; Uya Kuya
Most Famous Advertisement	Most Famous Program
**Proman (Big motorcycle version)**; Indofood (Indomie Festive 'Wagon' version); So Nice (All eat So Nice version); Teh Rio (SM*SH version); Vaseline (Noah version)	**Emak Ijah Pengen Ke Mekah**; 3 Semprul Mengejar Surga; Bidadari-Bdadari Surga; Pesantren & Rock 'N Roll Season 3; Si Cemong

Lifetime Achievement Award
**Alm. Ustad. Jeffrey Al Buchori**
