= Alda Risma =

Indonesian vocalist and actress

- Born: Alda Risma Elfariani; 23 November 1982; Bogor, West Java, Indonesia
- Died: 12 December 2006 (aged 24); East Jakarta, Indonesia
- Occupations: singer; actress
- Years active: 1998–2006
- Musical career
- Genre: Pop music
- Instrument: Vocals
- Label: Blackboard Records

Alda Risma Elfariani (23 November 1982 – 12 December 2006) was an Indonesian vocalist and actress. Born in Bogor, West Java, she showed interest in music from a young age and released her debut album Aku Tak Biasa (I'm Not Used to It) in 1998. Winning that year's Anugerah Musik Indonesia for Best Pop Female Solo Artist, Risma released a further three albums and acted in several soap operas. Having begun using narcotics, she was found dead of an overdose at an East Jakarta hotel; her boyfriend was charged with murder.

== Early life ==
Risma was born in Bogor, West Java, Indonesia, on 23 November 1982. The daughter of Amir Farid Rizal and Halimah, she was the couple's third child. She showed interest in music from a young age, competing in several vocal competitions while in elementary school. In 1991, she competed in the West Javan Arts and Sports Week, winning the vocal event with her renditions of "Tamasya" ("Holiday") and "Ibu Pertiwi" ("Motherland").

To advance Risma's vocal career, her parents helped her join the Elnino Jazz group, and she regularly participated in karaoke competitions. At the same time, she continued her secondary studies at PGRI 1 Secondary School in Bogor.

== Career ==
In 1996, Risma performed backing vocals on the single "We Can Make It" by the British boy band Code Red. This was followed by a solo career. In 1998, she released her debut album Aku Tak Biasa (I'm Not Used to It) on Blackboard records. The single "Aku Tak Biasa", which was written by Rudy Loho, led to her receiving the Anugerah Musik Indonesia for Best Pop Female Solo Artist in 1998. That year, other nominees included established vocalists such as Krisdayanti and Rita Effendy.

Risma went on to release three further albums: Kupilih Yang Mana (Which Should I Choose, 2001), Tangisan Yang Terakhir (The Final Tears, 2006), and Menanti Kekasih (Awaiting the Beloved, 2006). She also worked as a model. In 2001, she began an acting career, starring in soap operas such as Kesucian Prasasti (The Sacred Prasasti) and Romantika (Romance). Several of Risma's singles have since been covered by other Indonesian artists; for instance, "Aku Tak Biasa" was covered by Syahrini.

== Death ==
Risma developed a drug habit, and on 8 November 2005 she was resuscitated after experiencing an overdose. On 12 December 2006, Risma was found at Hotel Grand Menteng in East Jakarta, Indonesia, with bloody foam coming from her mouth. She was brought to Dr. Cipto Mangunkusumo Hospital, but was unable to be revived. The cause of death was declared to be a drug overdose. More than 20 injection sites were found on her body, with compounds detected including benzodiazepines, pethidine, and propofol. She was buried at Blender Public Cemetery on 13 December.

Risma's boyfriend, Ferry Surya Prakasa, was identified by the police as a suspect. He had retrieved her from Bekasi three days earlier, and they had been at the hotel together. He was charged with her murder, after being suspected of injecting the narcotics into her. He was found guilty, and was sentenced to fifteen years imprisonment. He served four and a half years, and was released on probation in January 2011 after an appeal to the Supreme Court of Indonesia. As a result of this appeal, the charge of premeditated murder (pembunuhan berencana) was reduced to homicide (pembunuhan). His probation lasted until 2014.

== Works cited ==
- "7 Alasan Mengapa Hukuman Pembunuh Alda Risma Dikorting 7 Tahun" [7 Reasons Why the Sentence of Alda Risma's Killer Was Reduced by 7 Years]. Detik.com (in Indonesian). 2 February 2011. Archived from the original on 1 April 2026.
- "Alda Pandai Menyanyi Sejak Dihukum Guru" [Alda a Good Singer Since Punished by Teacher]. Suara Pembaruan (in Indonesian). 19 November 1998. Archived from the original on 16 December 2000.
- "Alda Risma Dikuburkan di Bogor" [Alda Risma Buried in Bogor]. Liputan6 (in Indonesian). 13 December 2006. Archived from the original on 1 April 2026.
- "Alda Risma Elfariani". Tirto.id (in Indonesian). Archived from the original on 1 April 2026.
- Aurelia, Joan (11 December 2017). "Kisah Pilu Alda Risma, Pelantun Lagu "Aku Tak Biasa"" [The Sad Story of Alda Risma, Crooner of "Aku Tak Biasa"]. Tirto.id (in Indonesian). Archived from the original on 1 April 2026.
- "Alda Risma Tewas di Kamar 432 Hotel Grand Menteng" [Alda Risma Died in Room 432 of Grand Menteng Hotel]. Detik.com (in Indonesian). 13 December 2006. Archived from the original on 1 April 2026.
- Nugraheni, Naomy A. (13 December 2022). "16 Tahun Kematian Tragis Penyanyi Alda Risma, Tewas di Tangan Kekasihnya" [16 Years After the Tragic Death of Singer Alda Risma, Killed by Her Lover]. Tempo (in Indonesian). Archived from the original on 1 April 2026.
- Rosarians, Fransisco (13 May 2013). "Bebas, Pembunuh Alda Risma Tetap Wajib Lapor" [Freed, the Killer of Alda Risma Must Still Report]. Tempo (in Indonesian). Archived from the original on 1 April 2026.
- Sabandar, Switzy (13 December 2024). "Mengenang 18 Tahun Kematian Alda Risma, Ini Daftar Lagu Populernya" [Commemorating the 18th Anniversary of Alda Risma's Death, Here Are Her Popular Songs]. Liputan6 (in Indonesian). Archived from the original on 1 April 2026.
- Tifa, Farah (5 June 2024). "Pembunuhan Tragis Penyanyi Alda Risma" [The Tragic Killing of Singer Alda Risma]. Era.id (in Indonesian). Archived from the original on 1 April 2026.
