= Necronym =

Posthumous use of a personal name or other reference

A necronym (from the Greek words νεκρός, nekros, "dead", and ὄνυμα, ónuma, "name") is the name of or a reference to a person who has died. Many cultures have taboos and traditions associated with referring to the deceased, ranging from at one extreme never again speaking the person's real name, bypassing it often by way of circumlocution, to, at the other end, mass commemoration via naming other things or people after the deceased.

For instance, in some cultures it is common for a newborn child to receive the name (a necronym) of a relative who has recently died, while in others to reuse such a name would be considered extremely inappropriate or even forbidden. While this varies from culture to culture, the use of necronyms is quite common.

== Use ==
In Ashkenazi Jewish culture, it is a custom to name a child after a beloved relative who died as a way of honoring the deceased. Often the child will share the same Hebrew name as the namesake but not the given name in the vernacular language (e.g. English). For most practicing Jews it is taboo to name a child after a person who is still living.

In Japan, Buddhist families usually obtain a necronym, called a kaimyō, for a deceased relative from a Buddhist priest in exchange for a donation to the temple. Traditionally, the deceased were thereafter referred to by the necronym, as a sign of pious respect. This name was often the only one inscribed on gravestones in the past, though now it is more common to have the necronym in addition to the given name.

In Assyria and Babylonia, children were often given "substitute-names", necronyms of deceased family members, to keep the dead's names and identities alive. Evidence suggests that the desire for children may have been motivated by the desire to pass on these necronyms.

During the Cold War, necronyms were commonly used as a means of protecting an intelligence officer's true identity. For example, the Soviet KGB agent Konon Molody was only known as “Gordon Lonsdale” in the United States (the real Lonsdale was a Canadian born two years after Molody, and died aged 19 in 1943). Molody adopted the name when he himself was 32, eleven years after the real Lonsdale's death.

== Historiography ==
The practice of bestowing necronyms has sometimes caused confusion for historians. This is primarily because of the two birth certificates or records that could be present at a given time. This confusion often stems from the inability to differentiate between the records of each child. One such example is the case of Shigechiyo Izumi (1865?–1986), accepted in 1986 as the world's oldest man by The Guinness Book of World Records; it is suggested that he was possibly born in 1880 and the birth certificate of a brother whose name he assumed upon his death was submitted in place of Izumi's own.

== Examples ==
- Composer Ludwig van Beethoven, born in 1770, had a brother named Ludwig Maria who was born in 1769 and lived for only six days.
- Vincent van Gogh had a brother of the same name who was born, and died, on March 30, 1852, exactly one year before the painter's birth.
- Artist Salvador Dalí was born nine months and ten days after his brother, also named Salvador, died from gastroenteritis at the age of one year and nine months.
- NASCAR driver John Hunter Nemechek was named after his uncle John Nemechek, who died in a crash at Homestead–Miami Speedway about three months before John Hunter was born.
- Musician Richard David James, known better as Aphex Twin, claims he had a stillborn older brother named Richard, from whom he inherited his name. The Aphex Twin moniker is also a tribute to his legacy, though this fact in general might be fabricated.
- Franklin D. Roosevelt Jr., born in 1914, the fifth child of Franklin D. Roosevelt, shared the name with the future U.S. president's third child, who was born in 1908 and died the following year.
- Prabowo Subianto (born 1951) and his younger brother Hashim Sujono Djojohadikusumo (born 1954) were named after their uncles, Soebianto and Soejono Djojohadikoesoemo, who died during the Lengkong incident in 1946.

== See also ==
- Deadname
- Posthumous name
- Taboo against naming the dead
