= Aliando Syarief =

Indonesian singer-songwriter (born 1996)

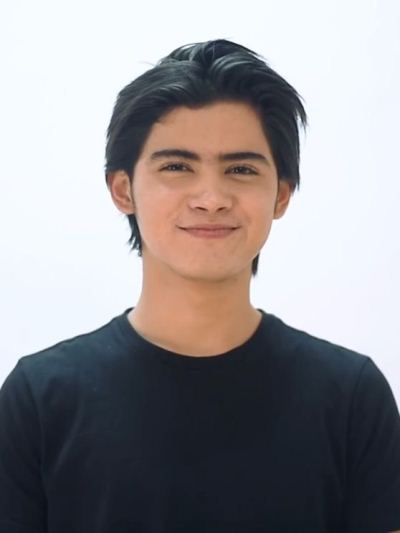
- Aliando Syarief in 2017
- Born: Muhammad Ali Syarief Afif Al Katiri; 26 October 1996 (age 29); Jakarta, Indonesia
- Other names: Aliando, Ali
- Occupations: Singer; Model
- Years active: 2008–present
- Musical career
- Genres: Pop
- Instrument: Vocals
- Label: Glow Music
- Member of: The Freaks
- Website: aliandosyarief.com

Muhammad Ali Syarief Afif Al Katiri (born 26 October 1996), also known as Aliando or Aliando Syarief, is an Indonesian actor, singer, model. He is an Arab descent from his father, Syarief Alkatiri, and his mother, Tengku Resi Refado (Resi Revando), and is from Minangkabau.

== Biography ==
Muhammad Ali Syarief was born in Jakarta, Indonesia, on 26 October 1996. He is the fourth child of four siblings of Syarief Alkatiri and Tengku Resi Revado. Syarief began his career in entertainment at the age of 12 with a part, as an extra in the TV movie Si Gundul Bocah Petir where his mother was one of the actresses. In Ganteng Ganteng Serigala, he played the role of a vampire. He became popular in feature films with the release of Garuda di Dadaku 2 in 2011. In addition to his movie roles, Ali has also had roles in soap operas, playing in Bara Bere and ABG Jadi Manten.

In 2015, he joined the musical group The Freaks, which also includes Nikita Willy, Teuku Rassya, and Calvin Jeremy. Their single "Jatuh Cinta Tak Ada Logika", a collaboration with Agnez Mo is a mash-up of her two songs "Ku T'lah Jatuh Cinta" and "Tak Ada Logika".

== Discography ==
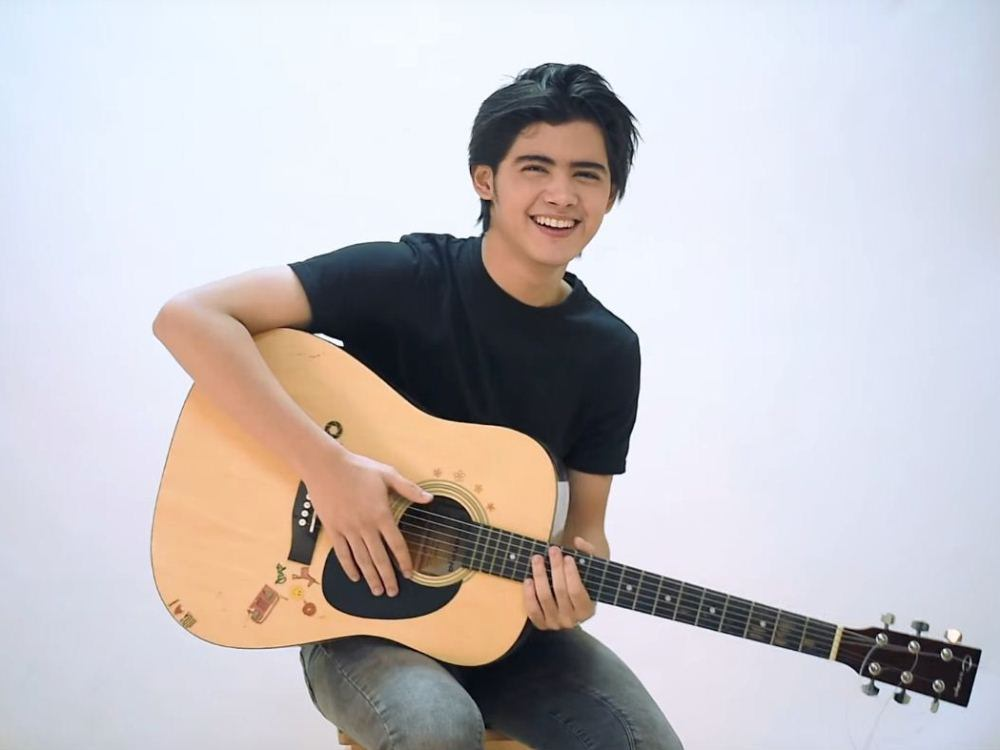
Aliando Syarief in 2016

=== Singles ===
Year	Title	Album	Label
2014	"Kau Terindah"	Non-album single	Glow Music
2015	"Hanyalah Kepada-Mu"	Non-album single	Glow Music
2015	"Suara Hati" (feat. Budhila)	Non-album single	Glow Music
2015	"Egoku"	The Freaks	Glow Music
2015	"Jatuh Cinta Tak Ada Logika" (The Freaks) (feat. Agnez Mo)	The Freaks	Glow Music
2015	"Bahagia Dengan Cinta" (The Freaks) (feat. Agnez Mo)	The Freaks	Glow Music
2015	"Cinta Sejati Hanya Sekali"(feat. Teuku Rassya)	The Freaks	Glow Music
2015	"Pergi Dari Hatiku"	The Freaks	Glow Music

== Filmograpy ==
=== Film ===
Year	Title	Role	Notes
2011	Garuda di Dadaku 2	Yusuf	
2015	Janji Hati	Dava	
2017	Pertaruhan	Ammar	
2017	Sweet 20	Hamzah muda	
2018	Asal Kau Bahagia	Ali	
2019	Warkop DKI Reborn 3	Dono Warkop	
2020	Warkop DKI Reborn 4	Dono Warkop	
2022	Argantara	Argantara Reynand	
2023	Indigo: What Do You See?	Aksa	
2024	Laut Tengah	Zidan Gibraltar	
2025	Narik Sukmo: Menari atau Mati	Dierja	

=== Short film ===
==== as cast ====
Year	Title	Role	Notes
2019	Sin	Dono Warkop	Rako Prijanto's version

==== as Director ====
Year	Title	Role	Notes
2021	Sekap	Director	

=== Television ===
Year	Title	Role	Notes
2010	Persada Langit Biru		
2012	Kisah Rama dan Shinta		
2012	Badil dan Blangkon Ajaib	Damar	
2012	Komisi Pemberantasan Setan	Burhan Amplop	
2013	Toko Kr.Amat		Episode: Headphone Suara Hati
2013–2014	Ibrahim Anak Betawi	Beni	
2014	Bara Bere	Ali	
2014	ABG Jadi Manten	Ali	
2014–2015	Ganteng-Ganteng Serigala	Digo / Zidan	
2015	Samson dan Dahlia	Himself	Guest
2015	Tarzan dan Zaenab	Himself	Guest
2015	Ganteng-Ganteng Serigala Returns	Digo	
2016	Betapa Aku Mencintaimu	Andra	
2016	Kutukan Cinta Sang Bintang	Bintang	
2016	Love is Music	Gilang	
2016	Detak Cinta	Damar	
2017	Mawar dan Melati	Juan	
2017	Pesantren & Rock n' Roll Reborn	Abay	
2017	Jodoh yang Tertukar	Abdullah	
2017	Siapa Takut Jatuh Cinta	Satya Adijaya	
2019	Calon Presiden	Tedjo	
2021	Keajaiban Cinta	Darwin Alvino	
2025	Aini: Malaikat Tak Bersayap	Attar	
2025	Pernikahan Dini Gen Z	Rangga	Series

Key
†	Denotes films that have not yet been released

- TBA: To be announced

=== Web series ===
Year	Title	Role	Notes
2022	Pertaruhan the Series	Muammar Bahari	
2023	A+	Bramantyo Sadewa	
2025	Cinta Mati	Bara Bimasena	Series
2026	Bunga di Tepi Jurang	Aldy	Series

=== Television film ===
- Si Gundul Bocah Petir (2008)
- Cinta Monyet di Kantin Sekolah (2012)
- Petaka Homeschooling (2013)
- 12:12 (2013)
- Kukibarkan Benderaku (2013)
- Yuk Kita Sekolah (2013)
- Lolly Love (2013)
- Kebaya untuk Katrina (2016)
- Etalase Ajaib: Sad Girl vs Bad Boy (2023)
- Supaya Cinta Kita Mulus, Pinjam Dombanya Seratus (2024)
- Neng Pete Bau Cintanya Warbiyasah (2024)
- Cewek Keker Berhati Flower (2024)

=== Music video ===
- "Ku Kan Menunggumu" — Teuku Rassya (2015)
- "Andai Kau Bisa Mengerti" — Nikita Willy (2016)

== Awards and nominations ==
Year	Award	Category	Recipients	Results
2014	Inbox Awards	Most Inbox Guest Host	Aliando Syarief	Won
2014	Insert Awards	Favorite Newcomer Celebrity	Aliando Syarief	Nominated
2014	SCTV Awards	Most Famous Actor	Ganteng-Ganteng Serigala	Won
2014	Yahoo! Celebrity Awards	Teenage Boy Idol	Aliando Syarief	Nominated
2014	Bintang RPTI Awards	Favorite Teenage Actor	Aliando Syarief	Won
2015	Infotainment Awards	Most Lure Male Celebrity	Aliando Syarief	Won
2015	Infotainment Awards	Most Awaited Celebrity Appearance	Aliando Syarief	Won
2015	Infotainment Awards	Most Fashionable Male Celebrity	Aliando Syarief	Nominated
2015	Infotainment Awards	Celebrity of the Year	Aliando Syarief	Won
2015	Infotainment Awards	Most Exist Social Media Celebrity	Aliando Syarief	Nominated
2015	Infotainment Awards	Most Romantic Celebrity Couple	Aliando Syarief & Prilly Latuconsina	Won
2015	Fokus Selebriti Awards	Male Hits Celebrity	Aliando Syarief	Nominated
2015	Global Seru Awards	Most Exciting Actor	Aliando Syarief	Nominated
2015	Global Seru Awards	Most Exciting Newcomer	Aliando Syarief	Nominated
2015	SCTV Music Awards	Most Famous Newcomer	Aliando Syarief	Won
2015	SCTV Music Awards	Most Famous Song	"Kau Terindah"	Won
2015	Panasonic Gobel Awards	Favorite Actor	Ganteng-Ganteng Serigala	Nominated
2015	Nickelodeon Indonesia Kids' Choice Awards	Favorite Actor	Aliando Syarief	Nominated
2015	Selebrita Awards	Most Celeb Newcomer	Aliando Syarief	Won
2015	Selebrita Awards	Exist Celeb	Aliando Syarief	Nominated
2015	Inbox Awards	Most Inbox Male Solo Singer	Aliando Syarief	Won
2015	Inbox Awards	Most Inbox Darling Social Media Artist	Aliando Syarief	Nominated
2015	Inbox Awards	Most Inbox Song	"Kau Terindah"	Won
2015	SCTV Awards	Famous Actor	Ganteng-Ganteng Serigala The Returns	Nominated
2016	Infotainment Awards	Most Lure Male Celebrity	Aliando Syarief	Won
2016	Infotainment Awards	Celebrity of the Year	Aliando Syarief	Nominated
2016	Infotainment Awards	Most Fashionable Male Celebrity	Aliando Syarief	Won
2016	Bright Awards	Favorite Male Star Advertisement	Aliando Syarief	Nominated
2016	SCTV Music Awards	Most Famous Male Solo Singer	Aliando Syarief	Won
2016	Insert Fashion Awards	Favorite Teen Male Celebrity	Aliando Syarief	Won
2016	Socmed Awards	Celeb Gram Male	Aliando Syarief	Won
2016	Nickelodeon Indonesia Kids' Choice Awards	Favorite Actor	Aliando Syarief	Nominated
2016	Nickelodeon Indonesia Kids' Choice Awards	Favorite Television Couple	Aliando Syarief & Prilly Latuconsina	Nominated
2016	Inbox Awards	Most Inbox Fanbase	Alycious	Won
2016	Inbox Awards	Most Inbox Song	"Pergi Dari Hatiku"	Nominated
2016	Inbox Awards	Most Inbox Male Solo Singer	Aliando Syarief	Won
2016	Indonesian Television Awards	Most Popular Actor	Aliando Syarief	Won
2016	Selebrita Awards	Most Exist Celeb	Aliando Syarief	Won
2016	Panasonic Gobel Awards	Favorite Actor	Ganteng-Ganteng Serigala The Return	Nominated
2016	Indonesian Social Media Awards	Male Celeb Facebook	Aliando Syarief	Nominated
2016	Indonesian Social Media Awards	Male Celeb Twitter	Aliando Syarief	Won
2016	SCTV Awards	Most Famous Singer	Aliando Syarief	Nominated
2016	SCTV Awards	Most Famous Leading Actor	Aliando Mini Series	Nominated
2017	Infotainment Awards	Most Lure Male Celebrity	Aliando Syarief	Nominated
2017	Infotainment Awards	Most Fashionable Male Celebrity	Aliando Syarief	Won
2017	Infotainment Awards	Most Exist Social Media Celebrity	Aliando Syarief	Won

== Host ==
- HUT SCTV 24 (SCTV)
- JKT48 Finding Idol (2nd season) (NET.)
