= Aini, Maharashtra =

Village in Maharashtra

Aini
- Village
- Interactive map of Aini
- Coordinates: 17.7661448°N 73.3421104°E
- Country: India
- State: Maharashtra

Aini, Maharashtra is a small village in Ratnagiri district, Maharashtra state in Western India. The 2011 Census of India recorded a total of 650 residents in the village. Aini, Maharashtra's geographical area is approximately 518 hectares (1,280 acres).
