= Baby Margaretha =

Indonesian model and actress (born 1984)

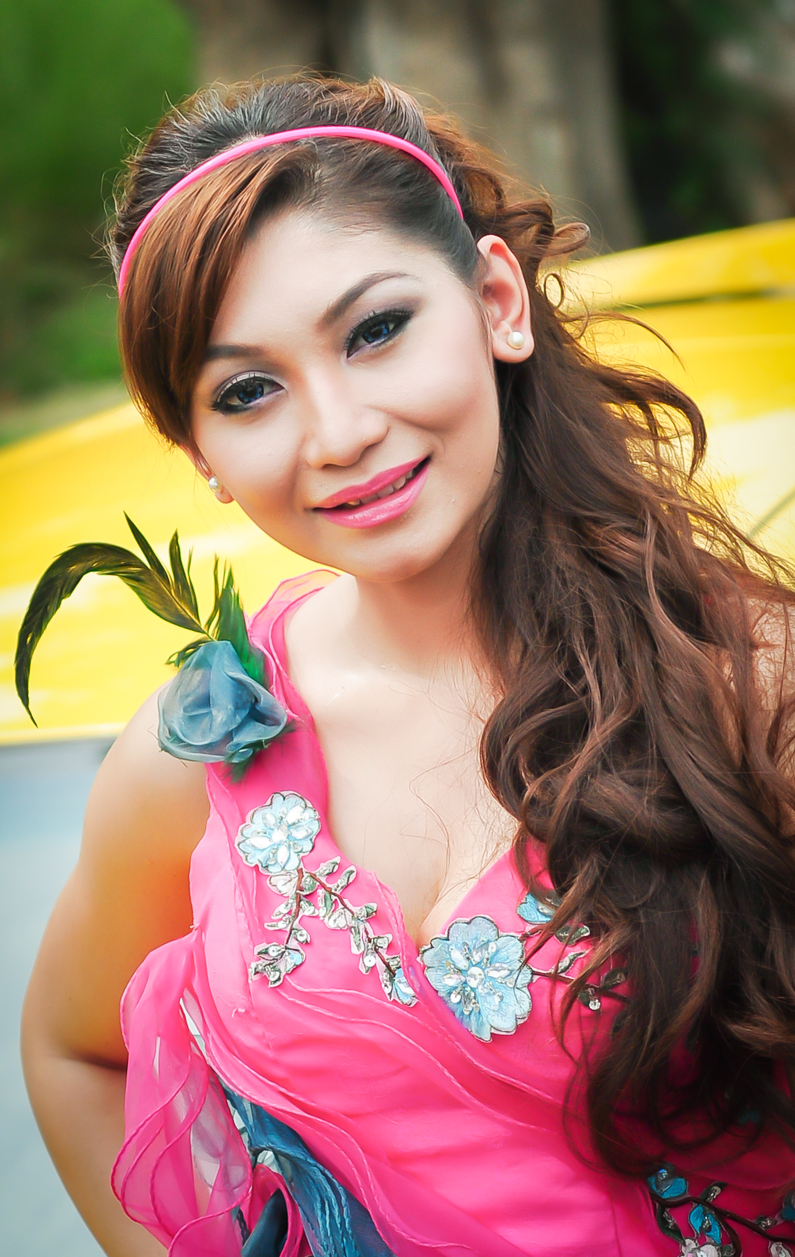
- Margaretha in 2013
- Born: Baby Margaretha; April 1, 1984 (age 41); Bandung, West Java, Indonesia
- Occupations: Model, actress
- Years active: 2009–present

Baby Margaretha (born April 1, 1984) is an Indonesian model and actress. She is known for Eyang Kubur (2013), Pocong Mandi Goyang Pinggul (2011) and Misteri Cipularang (2013).

== Career ==
Margaretha began her career in entertainment as a salesperson, then became a model in adult magazines, include FHM and Maxim.

She was in two soap operas: Awas Ada Sule 2 and Komeng Acak Adul, both of it aired on Global TV. Baby began played her first film, Pocong Mandi Goyang Pinggul. She directly to be a lead role and acting with American adult pornography stars Sasha Grey, Sheza Idris, Chand Kelvin, etc.

== Filmography ==
=== Films ===
- Pocong Mandi Goyang Pinggul (2011)
- Bangkitnya Suster Gepeng (2012)
- Misteri Cipularang (2013)
- Hantu Cantik Kok Ngompol? (2013)
- Eyang Kubur (2013)

=== Soap opera ===
- Awas Ada Sule (Global Tv)
- Komeng Acak Adul (Global Tv)

=== FTV ===
- Petaka Gadis Pencuri Rumah Kosong
