= News Cafe =

South African restaurant chain

News Cafe is a full-service cafe-bar and cocktail franchise restaurant chain founded in South Africa since 1995.

The first News Cafe opened in 1995 in Hatfield, Pretoria, shortly after the lifting of sanctions against South Africa signalled the entry of overseas hospitality franchises such as McDonald's into the South African food service market. In 2009 the first News Cafe was opened in India, followed by the second early in 2010.

The News Cafe brand is owned by the operating company Fournews headquartered in Edenvale (Ekurhuleni); it has branches across southern Africa, including a News Cafe in Zimbabwe, Kenya, Gaborone (Botswana) and in Ndola, Zambia.
