= Anjasmara =

Indonesian actor (born 1975)

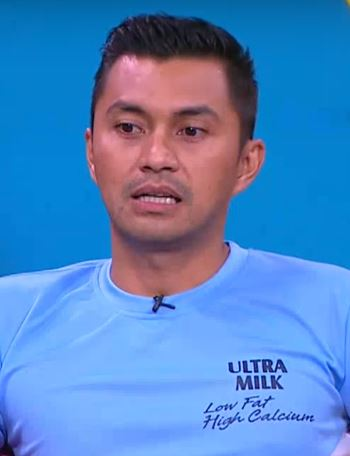
- Born: Anjasmara Prasetya; 13 November 1975 (age 50); Blitar, East Java
- Occupations: Celebrity, yogi, presenter, model, singer, producer
- Years active: 1993–present
- Height: 175 cm (5 ft 9 in)
- Spouse: Dian Nitami (m. 1999)

Anjasmara Prasetya (born 13 November 1975) is an Indonesian actor. Anjasmara began his career as a model and then starred in the soap opera Romi and July with his then-wife Dian Nitami.

== Personal life ==
Anjasmara Prasetya or Anjasmara, was born in Blitar, East Java on 13 November 1975, and began his career as a model.

Prasetya met his wife, Dian Nitami, during modelling and soap opera activities. Anjas formally proposed to Dian on 17 June 1999. The couple have two children, Sasikirana and Arka. They also have adopted two children, Amanda Annette Syariff and Luther Aldi Syariff.

As a superstar, Anjasmara faced big problems when his picture, taken for an exhibition event, faced criticism of religious mass organizations. Photos featuring nude pictures of Anjasmara with model Isabel Yahya were considered simply.

After Anjasmara was examined at the police department, he expressed regret for what he did. The religious mass organizations then withdrew demands originally aimed at Anjas.

== Career ==
He was the finalist cover boy in one teenager magazine. After that he became involved in fashion modeling. He was first seen on national television playing in "Hati Seluas Samudra" with Elma Theana and Jeremy Thomas. He starred in the soap opera Romi and Juli with his future wife, Dian Nitami. His role as a stupid and funny man in the soap opera Si Cecep resulted in him winning the SCTV Award, in the Most Popular Actor category.

Anjas played as a father in the movie Joshua, Oh, Joshua that was produced in 2000. Afterwards, Anjas starred in Koper in 2006.

== Filmography ==
1. Joshua, Oh, Joshua (2000)
2. Koper (2006)

== Soap operas ==
1. Hati Seluas Samudra
2. Romi dan Yuli
3. Mutiara Cinta
4. Wah Cantiknya!!!
5. Wah Cantiknya!!! 2
6. Si Cecep
7. Mukjizat Allah
8. Cintaku Di Rumah Susun
9. Cinta Indah
10. Sulaiman
11. Cinta Indah 2
12. Indahnya Karunia-Mu
13. Titipan Illahi
14. UFO
15. Anugerah
