= Daan Mogot =

Indonesian military officer (1928–1946)

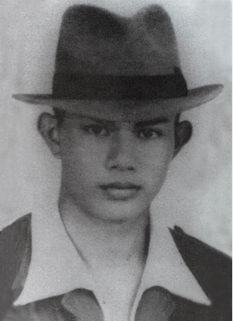
- Born: Daniel Mogot; 28 December 1928; Manado, North Sulawesi, Dutch East Indies
- Died: 25 January 1946 (aged 17); Lengkong, Tangerang, Indonesia
- Burial place: Taruna Heroes' Cemetery, Tangerang
- Military career
- Branch: Indonesian Army
- Rank: Major
- Conflicts: Indonesian National Revolution: Lengkong incident †

Elias Daniel Mogot (28 December 1928 – 25 January 1946) was a military officer involved in the Indonesian National Revolution. He was part of a group that established the Tangerang Military Academy and became its first director. He was killed during the Lengkong incident, an attempt to disarm a Japanese army depot in Lengkong.
