= Syahrini =

Indonesian singer and actress

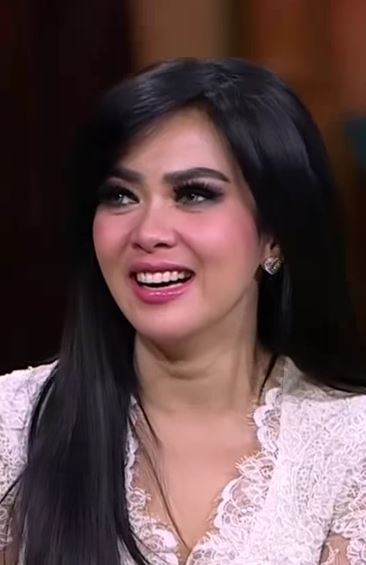
- Syahrini in 2014
- Born: Rini Fatimah Zaelani; 1 August 1980 (age 46); Sukabumi, West Java, Indonesia
- Other name: Syahrini
- Occupations: singer; actress; entrepreneur
- Years active: 2000–present
- Spouse: Reino Barack (m. 2019)
- Parent(s): Dadang Zaelani (alm); Wati Nurhayati
- Relatives: Ridwan Jaelani (brother); Aisyahrani (sister)
- Musical career
- Genre: Pop music
- Instrument: Vocals
- Label: Pelangi Records | MyMusic Records

Rini Fatimah Zaelani (born 1 August 1980), known professionally as Syahrini, is an Indonesian singer and actress. She spent her childhood in Sukabumi and later earned a bachelor's degree in law from Pakuan University in Bogor. Her first album was My Lovely, released in 2008. Also in her discography is the song "Tatapan Cinta," which appeared on the compilation soundtrack album of the film Coklat Stroberi (Chocolate Strawberry).

== Career ==
In her early music career, she and her sister Aisyahrani formed a duo vocal group named "Duo Geulis" which is in the dangdut genre. Later, in 2008, she collaborated with songwriters, including Dewiq and Yovie Widianto, for her first pop solo album, My Lovely. Two songs from that album, "Bohong" (Lies) and "My Lovely", were released as singles. In mid-2009, Syahrini released the single "Pusing Setengah Mati".

In late 2009, Syahrini met Anang Hermansyah on a TV show, who then asked her to be his duet partner. Together they released the singles "Jangan Memilih Aku" (Don't Choose Me) and "Cinta Terakhir" (The Last Love).

In 2010, she recorded a cover version of the late Alda Risma's song "Aku Tak Biasa" (I'm Not Ordinary), and reestablished her career as an independent solo female singer, after the collaboration with Anang ended.

== Legal disputes ==
On 2 May 2011, Syahrini was sued for a contract management mistake.

In February 2014, Syahrini was allegedly associated in a corruption case of the procurement of medical equipment in Banten province, along with Jennifer Dunn, Catherine Wilson, and Aura Kasih. The main suspect, Tubagus Chaeri Wardana (a.k.a. Wawan), who was prosecuted by Indonesia's Corruption Eradication Commission (KPK), was rumored to be not only romantically but also sexually involved with these famous women. The Indonesian media also reported that Wawan, who is the brother of Banten Province's Governor, Ratu Atut Chosiyah, spent the corrupted money on expensive gifts for several female celebrities, including Syahrini. She denied the rumor.

== Musical influences ==
She mentions Tata Young and Beyoncé Knowles as her inspirations, besides Indonesian pop diva, Krisdayanti. She also cites the girl group Pussycat Dolls, Rihanna, Kim Kardashian, (whom she has been compared to) and Jacqueline Kennedy Onassis as her fashion inspirations.

== Discography ==
=== Studio albums ===
- My Lovely (2008)
- Semua Karena Cinta (2012)

=== Mini album ===
- Jangan Memilih Aku (with Anang Hermansyah) (2009)

=== Singles ===
Year	Title	Album	Label
2010	"Jangan Memilih Aku" (with Anang Hermansyah)	Jangan Memilih Aku	Seven Music
2010	"Aku Tak Biasa"	Semua Karena Cinta	Pelangi Records
2011	"Kau Yang Memilih Aku"	Semua Karena Cinta	Pelangi Records
2012	"Sesuatu"	Semua Karena Cinta	Pelangi Records
2014	"Cinta Sendirian" (feat. Maruli Tampubolon)	Non-album single	Sony Music Indonesia
2014	"Cinta Tapi Gengsi"	Non-album single	Sony Music Indonesia
2014	"Sandiwara Cinta"	Non-album single	Sony Music Indonesia
2014	"Cetarrr"	Non-album single	Sony Music Indonesia
2015	"Seperti Itu"	Non-album single	Sony Music Indonesia

== Filmography ==
Film
Year	Title	Role	Notes
2008	Basahhh...	Maya	
2009	The Maling Kuburans	Ayu	
2011	Baik-Baik Sayang	Herself	Cameo
2018	Bodyguard Ugal-Ugalan	Herself	

Teleivison
Year	Title	Role	Notes	Network
2012–2013	Indonesia Mencari Bakat	Herself	Judge	Trans TV
2014	Ngabuburit	Herself	Comedian variety show	Trans TV
2014–2015	Princess Syahrini	Herself	Variety show	Trans TV
