= Cinta Laura =

German-born Indonesian singer, actress, and model (born 1993)

Cinta Laura Kiehl
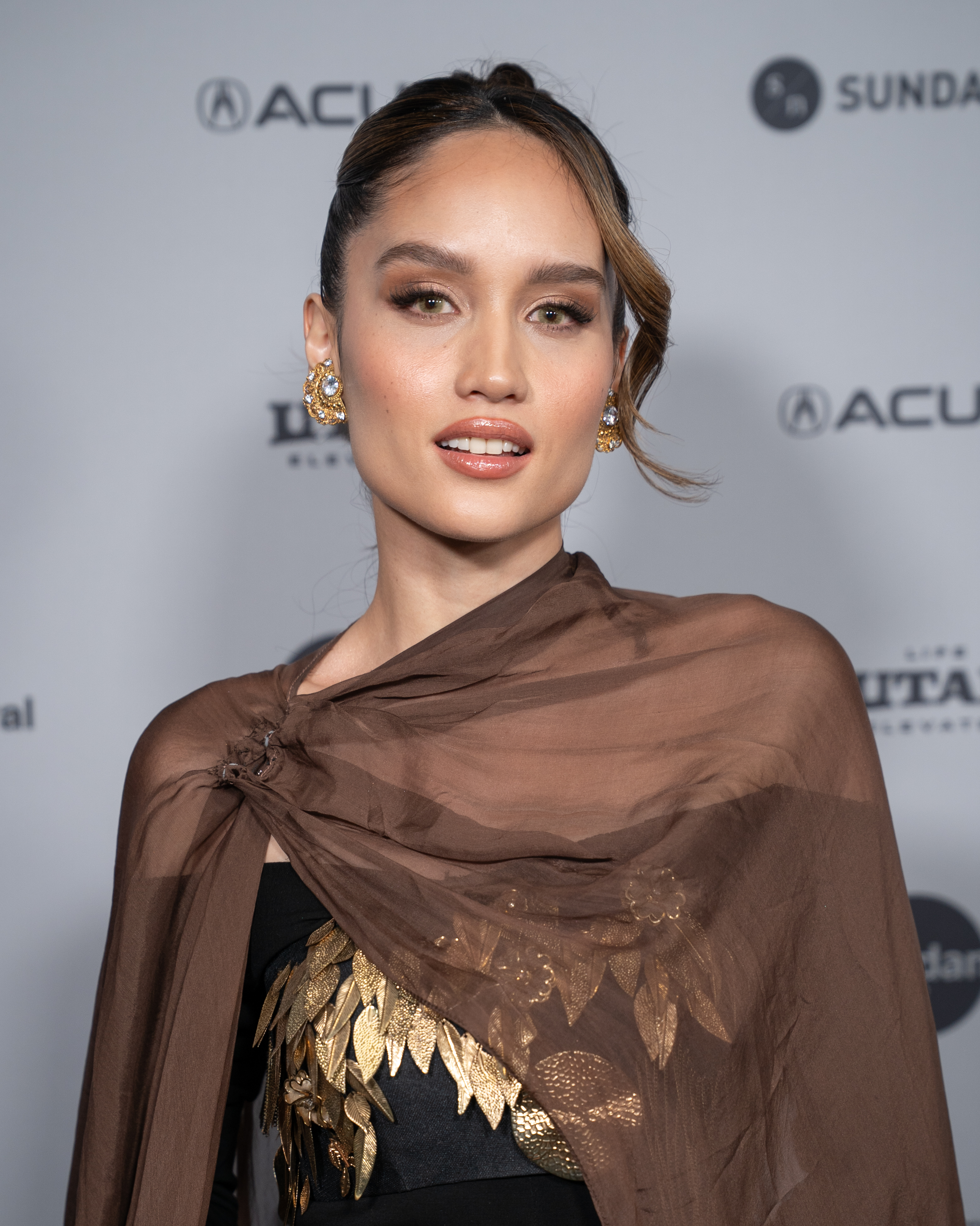
- Kiehl in 2026
- Born: Cinta Laura Kiehl; 17 August 1993 (age 33); Quakenbrück, Germany
- Education: Columbia University; Jakarta International School
- Occupations: Singer; actress; model
- Height: 170 cm (5 ft 7 in)
- Musical career
- Genres: Pop; electropop; dance
- Instruments: Vocal
- Years active: 2007–present
- Label: Sony Music Entertainment
- Website: cintalaurakiehl.co

Cinta Laura Kiehl (Indonesian: [ˈtʃinta ˈlaura]; German: [ˈtʃiːn'ta 'laʊʁa]; born 17 August 1993) is an Indonesian actress, singer, and model.

Kiehl was appointed ambassador of anti-violence against women and children by the Indonesian Ministry of Women Empowerment and Child Protection in 2019.

== Early life and education ==
Kiehl grew up in several countries such as the UAE, Saudi Arabia, Malaysia, Singapore, Germany and Indonesia. Upon her move to Indonesia at 12 years old, Kiehl became an Indonesian national swimmer, winning 10 gold medals, 7 silver medals and 7 bronze medals from various swimming competitions.

Kiehl studied at Columbia University in New York. She was a teaching assistant (TA) for Professor Herbert S. Terrace in Columbia's psychology department. While at Columbia, she joined the sorority Kappa Alpha Theta. Laura graduated cum laude from the university in May 2014. After graduating, she moved to Los Angeles to pursue her acting career in Hollywood, signing her contract under Netflix and Grindstone Entertainment Group.

== Career ==
=== 2007: Debut ===
Kiehl started her career in February 2007, debuted under MD Entertainment. Her first soap opera, Cinderella: Apakah Cinta Hanyalah Mimpi? aired on SCTV and TV2 (Malaysia) with 310 episodes, where she gained popularity and won ”2007 Indonesia's Best Actress” on 2007 SCTV Awards.

=== 2007–2012: Oh Baby, Cinta Laura album, and Hollywood Dreams ===
"Cinta Atau Uang"
"Cinta Atau Uang" is an electropop single from the Cinta Laura (album) and won the Indonesia Music Awards 2011 for "Best Dance/Dance Electronic".

In 2007, Kiehl appeared in her first movie Oh Baby, and also took part in the film's soundtrack. Oh Baby reigned in the no. 1 position of various charts in Indonesia, Malaysia and Brunei Darussalam. Soon after that, she released her first self-titled studio album, Cinta Laura (2010). The album was released in February 2010 and sold over a million copies. In the summer of 2010, Kiehl received the Wannabe Artist Award of 2010 Nickelodeon Indonesia Kids' Choice Awards.

She also filming her TV soap series, Upik Abu dan Laura (2008) and Air Mata Cinta (2009), which was a success in Indonesia and Malaysia aired in RCTI and TV3 (Malaysia). Following her success, she released the songs "You Say Aq", "Guardian Angel", "Cinta Atau Uang", "Tulalit", "Boomerang" and "Playlist" from her second album, Hollywood Dreams (2012).

=== 2013–present: International acting career and English album ===
In 2013, she decided to move to Los Angeles. She acted in the Hollywood-produced movie After the Dark (2013), starring Bonnie Wright and James D’Arcy. Laura worked with Grindstone Entertainment Group, continuing her acting in The Ninth Passenger (2018) by Hollywood producer Corey Large. She has also appeared on several Netflix Lifetime films, such as Crazy for the Boys (2018), TAR (2018), Goodnight (2018) and The Nanny is Watching (2018). Laura won "Best Film Actress" at the 2019 Latino Film awards, for the movie Goodnight (2018).

In 2019, Kiehl came back with her new English single Caliente and Vida after a seven-year hiatus. She also starred in several Indonesian films such as Target (2018), MatiAnak (2019) and Jeritan Malam (2019).

== Filmography ==
=== Film ===
Film
Year	Title	Role	Note	Genre	Ref.
2007	Oh Baby	Baby	Indonesian film	comedy film	
2010	Seleb Kota Jogja (SKJ)	Gadis	Indonesian film	comedy film	
2013	After the Dark	Utami	American film	science fiction	
2016	3 Pilihan Hidup	Laura	Indonesian film	reality film	
2018	The Ninth Passenger	Nicole	American film	horror-thriller film	
2018	Crazy For The Boys	Madison	American film	romance film	
2018	TAR	Camilla Landry	American film	horror-thriller film	
2018	Goodnight	Lisa	American film	horror film	
2018	The Nanny Is Watching	Rachel	American film	psychological thriller film	
2018	Drama Drama	Madison	American film	romance	
2018	Target	Cinta	Indonesian film	comedy film	
2019	MatiAnak	Ina	Indonesian film	horror-thriller film	
2019	Jeritan Malam	Wulan	Indonesian film	horror film	

=== Television ===
Television drama
Year	Title	Role	Production	Episodes	Ref.
2007	Cinderella (Apakah Cinta Hanyalah Mimpi?)	Cinta	MD Entertainment	310 eps.	
2008	Cinta	Cinta	MD Entertainment	3 eps.	
2008	Upik Abu dan Laura	Laura	SinemArt	110 eps.	
2009	Air Mata Cinta	Cinta	SinemArt	53 eps.	

=== Variety shows ===
Television series
Year	Title	Shows	Ref.
2010	Ayo Nge-dance Bareng Cinta	SCTV	
2013–2014	Yuk Keep Smile	Trans TV	
2021–2022	Indonesia Mencari Bakat	Trans TV	

== Discography ==
=== Studio albums ===
Year	Title	Singles	Sales	Certification
2010	Cinta Laura	"Cinta Atau Uang" (2008); "Shoot Me" (2009); "Guardian Angel" (2010)	1,000,000	2× Platinum; 11× Platinum; 12× Platinum
2012	Hollywood Dreams	"Tulalit" (2012); "All of My Life" (2013)	1,000,000	

=== Featured singles ===
Year	Title	Album	Ref
2008	"Penghianat Cinta"	Sang Juara by Duo Maia	
2009	"Let's Get the Beat"	Ost. Beat Hits featured Afgan	
2011	"Who's That Girl"	Twenty Ten by Guy Sebastian	
2019	"Vida"	TBA	
2019	"Caliente"	TBA	
2020	"Cloud 9"	Single	
2021	"Markisa"	Single	
2022	"Suka Kamu"	Single	
2022	"It's You"	Single	
2022 (remix)	"Oh Baby (2022)"	Single	
2023	"Bo$$y" Composed by Gerald (Weird Genius) & Ramengvrl	Single	
2023	"Loco"	Single	

== Awards and nominations ==
Year	Awards	Category	Nominated work	Result	Ref.
2007	Finalis Top Model Indonesia	Model	N/A	Won	
2007	SCTV Awards 2007	Aktris Ngetop (Best Actress)	N/A	Won	
2007	Gadis Magazine	Breakthrough Awards	N/A	Won	
2007	Panasonic Awards 2007	Aktris Panasonic Awards (Actress of the Year)	N/A	Nominated	
2008	Best Actress	Trax Magazine	N/A	Won	
2008	Best Actress	Teen Magazine	N/A	Won	
2008	Best Actress	Gadis Magazine	N/A	Won	
2008	Best Actress	Hai Magazine	N/A	Won	
2008	Indonesia Kids Choice Awards 2008	Trax Magazine	N/A	Won	
2008	Indonesia Kids Choice Awards 2008	Teen Magazine	N/A	Won	
2008	Indonesia Kids Choice Awards 2008	Gadis Magazine	N/A	Won	
2008	Indonesia Kids Choice Awards 2008	Hai Magazine	N/A	Won	
2008	Indonesia Kids Choice Awards 2008	Favorite Female Singer	N/A	Nominated	
2008	Indonesia Kids Choice Awards 2008	Favorite Actress	N/A	Won	
2008	Indonesia Kids Choice Awards 2008	Indonesian Star Wannabe Award	N/A	Nominated	
2009	Anugerah Planet Muzik 2009	Best Vocal - Song (New Female Singer)	Oh Baby	Nominated	
2009	Indonesia Kids Choice Awards 2009	Favorite Actress	N/A	Nominated	
2010	Indonesia Kids Choice Awards 2010	Favorite Female Singer	N/A	Nominated	
2010	Indonesia Kids Choice Awards 2010	Favorite Actress	N/A	Nominated	
2010	Indonesia Kids Choice Awards 2010	Indonesian Star Wannabe Award	N/A	Won	
2011	SCTV Music Awards 2011	Best Album	Cinta Laura	Nominated	
2011	Indonesia Kids Choice Awards 11	Favorite Female Singer	N/A	Nominated	
2011	Anugerah Musik Indonesia 2011	Best Dance/Electronica Music Performance	Cinta Atau Uang	Won	
2011	FTV Awards	Favorite Theme Song	Cinta Atau Uang	Nominated	
2013	Anugerah Musik Indonesia 2013	Best Electronic Dance/Dance Production Work	Tulalit (feat. Rayi Putra)	Nominated	
2014	MNC Lifestyle Award	Education Icon		Won	
2016	Pop Awards 2016	Female Pop Awards	N/A	Nominated	
2019	Latino 5th Annual Film Festival	Best Female Actress	Goodnight	Won	
2020	Forbes	Most Influential Artist			
2021	Fimela	Most Magnificent Celebrity		Won	
2022	Piala Maya	Video Klip Terbaik		Nominated	
2022	Anugerah Musik Indonesia	Best Female Dance Solo		Won	
2023	Beautyfest Asia	Most Influential Woman		Won	
2023	Insert Award	Favorite Female Celebrity		Won	
