= Safa dan Marwah =

- Created by: SinemArt
- Directed by: Desiana Larasati
- Starring: Nikita Willy; Risty Tagor; Rionaldo Stockhorst; Riza Shahab; Citra Kirana; Mieke Amalia; Bobby Joseph
- Opening theme: Biarkan Aku Jatuh Cinta by ST 12
- Ending theme: Biarkan Aku Jatuh Cinta by ST 12
- Country of origin: Indonesia
- Original language: Indonesian
- No. of episodes: 232

Production
- Production location: Jakarta
- Running time: 60 minutes
- Production company: SinemArt

Original release
- Network: RCTI
- Release: 28 September 2009 – 19 May 2010

Safa dan Marwah (Safa and Marwah) is an Indonesian TV serial that was aired on RCTI. It was produced video productions house public distributor company network by SinemArt directed by Desiana Larasati.

== Cast ==
- Nikita Willy as Safa
- Risty Tagor as Marwah; Renita (dual role)
- Rionaldo Stockhorst as Ilham; Rio (dual role)
- Citra Kirana as Atikah
- Riza Shahab as Adil
- Christian Sugiono as Farid
- Melody Prima as Eva
- Bobby Joseph as Ello
- Mieke Amalia as Siti
- Christ Laurent as Neo
- Umar Lubis as Husein; Zainal; Boy (dual role)
- Moudy Wilhelmina as Ratna
- Yadi Timo as Rajaf
- Cut Memey as Zalimah
- Inggrid Kansil as Ratih
- Riyanto RA as Fikri
- Epy Kusnandar as Kadir
- Fadly as Rudi
- El Manik as Kades
- Donna Harun as Dita
- Adjie Pangestu as Aji

== Synopsis ==
Safa is a tomboy, yet beautiful girl. She is tough and very kind hearted. She lives with her mother, Siti, in a fishing village. Safa never realizes that Siti is not her real mother. All she knows is that she wants to help Siti to find her sister, Siti's daughter, who she misses dearly. Marwah on the other hand is a very gentle, beautiful, and religious rich girl. She is the typical girl whom every man adores. Marwah loves her family very much despite all their flaws. But she is not aware that actually they are not her biological family.

One day, Safa moves to Jakarta upon receiving her scholarship from a prestigious University. There she met Marwah, the idol of the whole campus. Friendship grows between them. Their closeness leads to Siti meeting Marwah in an occasion. The world beneath her feet trembles when Siti laid eyes on Marwah. Her motherly instinct kicks in, despite not knowing who Marwah actually is.
