= Romy Soekarno =

Indonesian politician (born 1970)

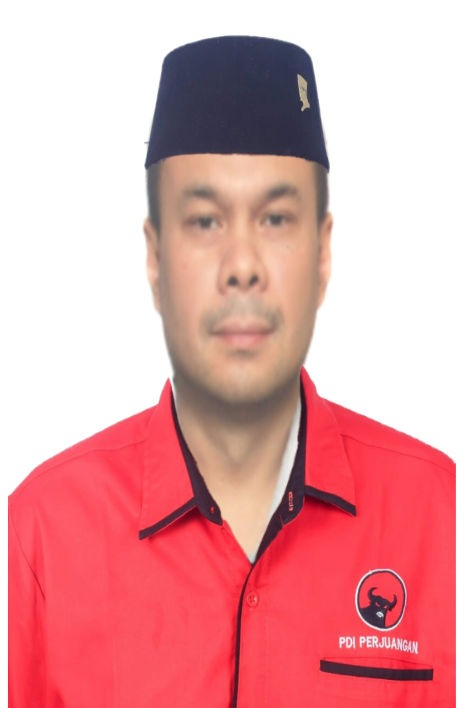

Member of the House of Representatives
- Incumbent
- Assumed office 1 October 2024
- Constituency: East Java VI
- Majority: 51,245 (2024) (Note: Did not win a seat at the election, but was sworn in due to resignations of two candidates with more votes.)

Personal details
- Born: Hendra Rahtomo; 4 January 1970 (age 56) Jakarta, Indonesia
- Party: PDI-P
- Parent: Rachmawati Soekarnoputri (mother)

Hendra Rahtomo (born 4 January 1970), better known as Romy Soekarno, is an Indonesian politician and businessman who is a member of the House of Representatives from the Indonesian Democratic Party of Struggle, serving since 2024. He is a grandson of first Indonesian president Sukarno and nephew of fifth president Megawati Sukarnoputri.

== Early life ==
Romy Soekarno was born in South Jakarta on 4 January 1970 to Rachmawati Sukarnoputri and Martomo Pariatman Marzuki. Rachmawati is the daughter of the first president of Indonesia Sukarno and younger sister of fifth president Megawati Sukarnoputri. Romy was Rachmawati's first child, before Rachmawati divorced and remarried twice, having two more sons.

== Career ==
In 1997, Romy founded musical band 1945MF. The group released albums, with its six being released in 2010. Romy is also the CEO of Mahadana Group, a commodity trading company, and takes part in the family's educational foundations.

During the 2024 legislative election, Romy ran for a seat in the House of Representatives from East Java's 6th district (Blitar, Kediri, Blitar Regency, Kediri Regency and Tulungagung Regency). Romy won 51,245 votes, fourth out of PDI-P candidates in the district, and failed to win a seat as the party secured just two seats in the district. However, after the election, two PDI-P candidates in the same district (Sri Rahayu and Arteria Dahlan) resigned their seats, thus allowing Romy Soekarno to take a seat in the House of Representatives. He was sworn in on 1 October 2024. Dahlan stated that he resigned in favor of Romy to make way for Sukarno's family.

== Family ==
Romy married actress Donna Harun in 1996, and the couple has one son, Muhammad Jihad Rahtomo Soekarnoputra (Jeje Soekarno). Romy and Harun divorced in 2018.
