= Cinderella (Apakah Cinta Hanyalah Mimpi?) =

- Genre: Romance
- Created by: Manoj Punjabi
- Starring: Cinta Laura; Galih Ginanjar; Eva Laurent; Revand Narya; Rezky Aditya; Kiki Farrel; Nena Rosier; Lydia Kandou; Siti Anizah; Herfiza Novianti
- Theme music composer: Aquarius Musikindo
- Opening theme: "Let's Dance Together" – Melly Goeslaw & BBB
- Ending theme: "Let's Dance Together" – Melly Goeslaw & BBB
- Country of origin: Indonesia
- Original language: Indonesian
- No. of episodes: 308

Production
- Executive producer: Shania Punjabi
- Producers: Dhamoo Punjabi; Manoj Punjabi
- Running time: 60 minutes
- Production company: MD Entertainment

Original release
- Network: SCTV
- Release: February 5 – December 9, 2007

Related
- Makin Sayang; Suci

Cinderella (Apakah Cinta Hanyalah Mimpi?) (lit. "Cinderella (Is Love Just a Dream?)") is an Indonesian soap opera produced by MD Entertainment that aired on SCTV in 2007. The soap opera first aired on February 5, 2007 and ended on December 9, 2007 after 308 episodes. The theme song soundtrack titled "Let's Dance Together" was sung by Melly Goeslaw with BBB.

The soap opera starred among others Cinta Laura, Galih Ginanjar, Eva Laurent, Rezky Aditya, Kiki Farrel, Lydia Kandou, Nena Rosier, Siti Anizah, and Herfiza Novianti. The soap opera aired every day at 18:00. This drama also aired in Malaysia on TV2 channel Monday to Thursday 12:30 pm WMP. The soap opera won "Famous Program" award at the 2007 SCTV Awards.

== Cast ==
- Cinta Laura as Cinta
- Galih Ginanjar as Rasya
- Eva Laurent as Nana
- Revand Narya as Akbar
- Sofyan Hadi as Reihan
- Rezky Aditya as Rama
- Kiki Farrel as Davin
- Nena Rosier as Cynthia
- Tasman Taher as Bayu
- Lydia Kandou as Marlina
- Shandy Ishabella as Cinta
- Fandy Christian as Hendra
- Siti Anizah as Lala
- Fendy Chow as Levi
- Poppy Bunga as Nina
- Herfiza Novianti as Lulu
- Beauty Lupita as Monica
- Irvan Farhad as Arga
- Sheza Idris as Hera
- Putri Luna as Alisha
- Aiman Ricky as Alan
- Afifa Syahira as Nia
- Cahya Kamila as Salma
- Ervan Naro as Hanif
- Jehan Sienna as Nurma
- Metta Permadi as Dhani
- Kris Anjar as Ronald
- Boy Harsya as Vito
- Fadli Akhmad as Krisna
- Linda Ramadhanty as Juli
- Benny Ruswandi as Bram
- Henky Solaiman as Wisnu
- Nella Anne as Nayla
- Achul Wiraperwata as Zakir
- Ochie Anggraini as Rita
- Nurul Hidayati as Maya
- Ucok Baba as Boni
- Nia Ramadhani (cameo)
- Zaneta Georgina

== Awards and nominations ==
Year	Award	Category	Recipient	Result
2007	SCTV Awards	Famous Program	Cinderella (Apakah Cinta Hanyalah Mimpi?)	Won
