= Arteria Dahlan =

Indonesian politician

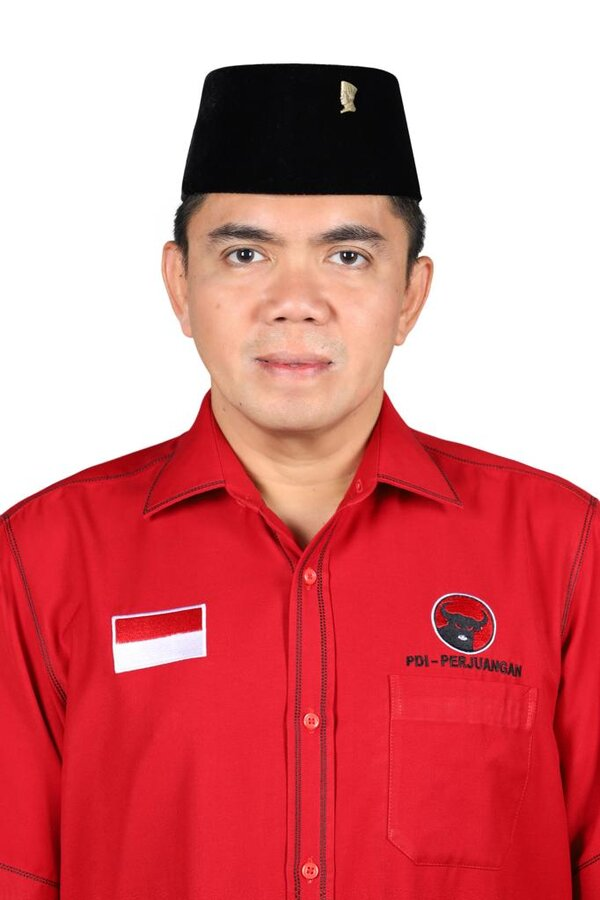

Member of the House of Representatives
- In office 23 March 2015 – 1 October 2024
- Preceded by: Djarot Saiful Hidayat
- Constituency: East Java VI
- Majority: 108,259 (2019)

Personal details
- Born: 7 July 1975 (age 50) Jakarta, Indonesia
- Party: PDI-P
- Parent: Zaini Dahlan (mother) Wasniar (father)
- Education: University of Indonesia; Trisakti University

Arteria Dahlan (born 7 July 1975) is an Indonesian lawyer and politician from the PDIP. He served as a member of House of Representatives between 2015 and 2024.

Arteria is a former Interim Substitute (PAW) for Djarot Saiful Hidayat who was appointed as Deputy Governor of DKI Jakarta to accompany Governor Basuki Tjahaja Purnama in 2015.

== Early life and education ==
Arteria's parents are Minang migrants from Kukuban, Maninjau, West Sumatra. They migrated to Jakarta in the 1950s and worked as teachers.

According to Arteria, he comes from a Masyumi family. Arteria's paternal grandparents were Dahlan bin Ali and his wife Dahniar Yahya, (called Ibu Nian), a Quran teacher in Kukuban, Maninjau, also a Masyumi figure. Dahniar was once detained during the Sukarno administration because she was suspected of being involved in the Revolutionary Government of the Republic of Indonesia (PRRI). Arteria's maternal grandparents were Wahab Hasyim, a textile merchant in Tanah Abang whose house was often used as a transit point for Minang migrants, and his wife Lamsiar. Arteria's paternal grandparents were Wahab Hasyim.

Arteria claimed that his father once tried to enter the Police Academy, but was rejected in the final test because of "indications of Masyumi and PRRI".

== Politics ==
On March 28, 2018, Arteria once cursed the Ministry of Religious Affairs of the Republic of Indonesia with the word bangsat during a DPR Commission III working meeting. A day later, he apologized for his remarks.

He was reelected for his first full term in the 2019 legislative election, placing second out of two elected PDI-P candidates from his district and fourth overall with 108,259 votes. In October 2019, Arteria drew controversy regarding his attitude during an argument with senior economist Emil Salim. He interrupted Emil when he was speaking, then stood pointing at Emil and accusing his thinking of being misguided. Although he received a lot of criticism, he called his attitude a form of ideological struggle and refused to apologize to Emil.

On 17 January 2022, Arteria questioned the Chief Prosecutor of West Java Asep Nana Mulyana who spoke in Sundanese during a working meeting of Commission III of the House of Representatives with the Attorney General's Office. This caused polemics among the Sundanese ethnic community, including West Java Governor Ridwan Kamil who asked him to apologize. He had refused to apologize on 19 January 2022 because he considered that there was nothing wrong with his statement. In fact, he had linked this to the issue of the existence of the Sunda Empire's fictitious imperial element in the prosecutor's institution, so that one of the Sunda Empire officials, Rangga Sasana, had planned to run over him at the Indonesian Parliament Building, although it was eventually canceled. He finally apologized to the Sundanese and West Javanese community on January 20, 2022.

Following the 2024 election, Dahlan did not qualify for a second term, placing third among PDI-P candidates in his electoral district where PDI-P won two seats. The second place winner, incumbent Sri Rahayu, resigned before she could be sworn in. Instead of replacing her, Dahlan also resigned from the seat, hence fourth-place winner Romy Soekarno (grandson of first Indonesian president Sukarno) was sworn in instead.
