= Donna Harun =

Indonesian actress and model (born 1968)

- Born: Donna Frederika Rubyanti; 21 February 1968 (age 58); Bandung, West Java, Indonesia
- Occupations: Celebrity; Model
- Spouse: Hendra Rahtomo (m. 1996)
- Children: Ricky Harun; Jeje Soekarno
- Parent(s): Harun Al Rasyid Wirasaputra; Rosa Harun
- Relatives: Regina Ursula Shandi (brother)

Donna Harun (born 21 February 1968) is an Indonesian actress and model of Dutch-Indonesian descent. She is the mother of actor Ricky Harun and mother-in-law of the actress and model Herfiza Novianti.

== Career ==
Harun began her career as a model and then entered the world of entertainment. Her first film was Asmara in 1992. She participated on albums with Donna Arsinta and Novia Kolopaking. She worked on the Mamamia Show in Season 3 in 2010.

In 2011, she starred in the musical drama film Langit Biru with Ratnakanya Annisa Pinandita and her son, Jeje Soekarno. That same year, she also appeared in the soap opera Go Go Girls, with 7icons' member Dion Wiyoko, Billy Chong, and Cinta Dewi.

In 2012, she starred the sitcom soap opera Kampung Hawa, with Shareefa Danish and Epy Kusnandar on Trans7. She won "Best Female Leading Role" at the 2012 Festival Film Bandung.

== Personal life ==
She was born Donna Frederika Rubyanti on 21 February 1968, in Bandung. She is the younger sister of the model Regina Ursula Shandi. She is divorced from Ardy Gustav and they have one son, Ricky Harun, who works as an actor and model.

In 1996, she married Hendra Rahtomo/Romy Soekarno, who is the grandson of the first President of Indonesia, Sukarno. They have one son named Jeje Soekarno, who is also an actor.

== Filmography ==
=== Film ===
Year	Title	Role	Notes
1992	Asmara		Supporting role
2005	Ariel & Raja Langit	Galang's mother	Supporting role
2008	Drop Out	Dr. M's wife	Supporting role
2008	Syahadat Cinta	Mrs. Jamilah	Supporting role
2011	Langit Biru	Rita	Supporting role
2013	Mika	Indi's mother	Supporting role
2013	Berlian Si Etty	Miranda	Supporting role
2015	2014	Ningrum	Supporting role
2015	Romeo + Rinjani	Romeo's mother	Supporting role
2015	Youtubers	Mother	Cameo
2015	99% Muhrim: Get Married 5	Jali's mother	Special appearances
2016	Catatan Dodol Calon Dokter	Mrs. Hamzah	Supporting role

=== Soap Opera ===
- Tiga Orang Perempuan
- Perkawinan Sedarah
- Indahnya KaruniaMu
- Ajang Ajeng
- Pink
- Damai Dihatimu
- Jangan Ada Dusta Diantara Kita
- Sahabat Sejati
- Cinta Tanpa Logika
- Akibat Pengaulan Bebas
- Dendam Membara
- Safa dan Marwah
- Alisa
- Kampung Hawa
- Angel's Diary Season 2
- Go Go Girls
- Dia atau Diriku
- Mimo Ketemu Poscha
- Cahaya Gemilang

=== Film Television ===
- Jangan Pasung Aku
- Dia Tetap Ibuku
- Aku Diperbudak Ibu Tiriku
- Jejak Berdarah
- Kejamnya Anak Kandung Mulianya Anak Tiri
- Aku Tak Secantik Ibuku
- Terimalah Taubat Ibu Ya Allah

== Video Clip ==
Year	Title	Artist
2008	"Tak Lekang Oleh Waktu"	Kerispatih
2009	"Hafizah"	Sembilan Band
2009	"Biarkan Berlalu"	Hello
2009	"Nilailah Aku"	Kangen Band
