= Cinta Laura (album) =

Studio album by Cinta Laura
- Released: 27 February 2010
- Recorded: July–December 2009
- Genres: Pop; dance-pop; electropop; hip hop
- Length: 40:04
- Languages: Indonesian; English
- Labels: Sony Music Indonesia; Columbia Records; RCA Records
- Producers: Jan Djuhana; Toto Widjojo; DJ Sumantri; Herdiana Kiehl

Cinta Laura chronology
Cinta Laura (2010)	Hollywood Dreams (2012)

Singles from Cinta Laura
- 1. "Cinta Atau Uang" Released: November 6, 2009; 2. "Shoot Me" Released: March 2, 2010; 3. "Guardian Angel" Released: July 9, 2010

Cinta Laura is the debut studio album by Indonesian-based German singer Cinta Laura, released in Indonesia by Sony Music Indonesia on February 27, 2010. Produced by Jan Djuhana, this album contains 10 tracks, including dance-pop and electropop songs. The album was sold in Indonesia, Malaysia, and Brunei Darussalam, and was certified 13× platinum. The first single from this album "Cinta Atau Uang" was released in December 2009. The album was nominated for "Best Pop Solo Album" award in SCTV Music Awards 2011.

== Background ==
Cinta Laura is the debut album by Cinta Laura, named after herself and was released in February, originally scheduled the album was released on January 23, 2010, but due to no contact Cinta Laura to work "Icon Dance Off Asia", however because there is contact to work "Icon Dance Off Asia", then release this album postponed until February 27, 2010. On this album, she brings the kind of electropop song like a songs sung by the American singer, Lady Gaga. Her first album release contains 10 songs that 7 of them are new songs, rhythmic dance in accordance with a young child. Not only contains a homage electropop song, Laura also serves other musical genres in his work. Like Indo pop song and blues music.

Her desire to do the job one by one as well which makes it just released her album in February 2010, after a few times a duet with popular Indonesian singer, such as Ahmad Dhani, Duo Maia, and Afgan. She revealed in the making of this album takes about six months, from July to December 2009.

== Singles and songs ==
"Cinta Atau Uang"
"Cinta Atau Uang" is an electropop song, was the first single from the album and won the Indonesia Music Awards 2011 for "Best Dance/Dance Electronic".

Starting with the song "Cinta Atau Uang" are her electropop type music and of course able to be accepted by the wide as her first single. The song was awarded Indonesian Music Award 2011, category "Best Dance/Electronic Dance Production". In May 2011, Cinta Laura released "Shoot Me" as the second single and music video inspired by the character Lara Croft that back nuances of dance-pop and able make the audience stomped. Laura also showed his ability to sing sweet songs like "Cape Hati" and "Guardian Angel" of the opposite pop-blues music.

Songs in this album is also much used as a soundtrack song or theme song on Indonesian television. The song "Oh Baby" is the debut of her first single which is also in the soundtrack of the movie Oh Baby, the soundtrack Ost. Oh Baby there is also a song titled "We Can Do It". In the same year he also recorded a song entitled "You Say Aku" for the soundtrack of the television series, Upik Abu and Laura. Her hits song in 2010, entitled "Cinta Atau Uang" was also the theme song from the second movie that starred, Seleb Kota Jogja (SKJ). This song was nominated in the category of "Favorite Theme Song" awards FTV Awards 2011, As well as a serial drama backsound of FTV on SCTV, with other songs that became the theme song is "Guardian Angel".

== Promotion, live performance, and certification ==
Sony Music as the party label claimed to work with KFC in marketing this album. After less than 2 weeks the album had sold up to 100,000 CDs, and Laura was awarded "Platinum Award". This Cinta Laura album is that special packaging, as any packaging in which there is a mini magazine called "Cinta Magazine". Mini magazine in cooperation with the teen magazine featuring all things about Cinta Laura, so that fans can get to know her personality.

Cinta Laura performed the song "Cinta Atau Uang" in the Indonesia's Got Talent final on July 17, 2010. He also performed this song in awards SCTV Music Awards 2011 that the album was also nominated for "Best Pop Album of Solo". Not only shown in the singles main musical events, it also shows the other songs in this album such as "Guardian Angel", "Shoot Me", "Kebebasan", "You Say Aku", "Oh Baby", "We Can Do It" in the event music broadcast on television such as Inbox and Dahsyat.

After six months of the release, Cinta Kaura blessed 11× Platinum, physical sales eventually reached nine hundred thousand copies. In addition to the sales achieved fantastic, Cinta's album is also used for the dance competition program entitled KFC Ayo Ngedance Bareng Cinta Laura which is also to promote the album and the singles. Following sold one million copies cds studio album marketed through KFC store, Laura gets certified 12× Platinum.

== Track listing ==
No.	Title	Writer(s)	Length
1.	"Cinta Atau Uang"	Alam Urbach	3:14
2.	"Cape Hati"	Dewiq	4:31
3.	"Shoot Me"	Novi M. Umar	3:16
4.	"Ya Iya Lah"	?	4:18
5.	"You Say Aku"	Novi M. Umar	4:11
6.	"Kebebasan"	Singiku	4:01
7.	"We Can Do It"	Novi M. Umar, Teguh D.	3:32
8.	"Oh Baby"	Syfha Ramadhan	4:28
9.	"Guardian Angel"	Ade, Jeje	4:34
10.	"Let Me Go"	?	3:34

== Release history ==
Region	Date	Format(s)	Label
Indonesia	February 27, 2010	CD, digital download	Sony Music Indonesia, Columbia Records
Malaysia	March 2, 2010	CD, digital download	Sony Music Malaysia, Columbia Records, RCA Records

== Certifications ==
Region	Certification	Certified units/sales
Indonesia	12× Platinum	1,000,000
