= Herfiza Novianti =

Indonesian actress and model

- Born: Sukabumi, West Java, Indonesia
- Other name: Herfiza Harun
- Occupations: Celebrity; Model
- Years active: 2003 - present
- Spouse: Ricky Harun (m. 2013)
- Children: Mikaila Akyza Pratama
- Parent(s): Hendra Sumantri; Rina Faryani

Herfiza Harun (née Novianti) is an Indonesian actress and model. She is the wife of actor Ricky Harun and the daughter-in-law of the actress and model Donna Harun.

== Career ==
Novianti began her career as a model, appearing in a 2003 magazine of Aneka Yess!. After the competition, Novianti had offered to casting in her debut soap opera, titled Dia, where aired on Indosiar from 2003 to 2005. During her soap opera career, Novianti has appeared in several soap opera, such as Cinta Fitri (Musim Ramadhan 2), Air Mata Cinta, Si Biang Kerok Cilik and Kiamat Sudah Dekat of season 2 and 3, which produced by Deddy Mizwar.

In addition, Novianti also appeared in several movies, such as Oh My God! (her debut film) and Kambing Jantan: The Movie, which produced by comedian and also writer Raditya Dika in 2009. In 2010, Novianti had starred for a controversial horror movie, titled Suster Keramas, with Rin Sakurigi, a Japanese adult porn.

== Personal life ==
Herfiza Novianti is the third child of four siblings of Hendra Sumantri and Rina Faryani. She married the actor Ricky Harun on June 15, 2013. They have one daughter.

== Filmography ==
=== Film ===
Year	Title	Role	Notes
2008	Oh My God	Indri	
2009	Kambing Jantan: The Movie	Kebo	Lead role
2010	Suster Keramas	Kayla	Lead role
2010	Menculik Miyabi	Jessica	Lead role
2012	Sanubari Jakarta	Srikandi	Segment: "Topeng Srikandi"
2012	Kakek Cangkul	Thalia	Lead role

=== Television ===
Year	Title	Role	Notes	Network
2003–2005	Dia		Supporting role	Indosiar
2006	Hidayah	Rina	Episode: "Durhaka Terhadap Ibu, Menjelang Ajal Tubuh Bersisik Seperti Ikan"	Trans TV
2006	Kiamat Sudah Dekat 2	Novia/Opi	Supporting role	SCTV
2007	Kiamat Sudah Dekat 3	Novia/Opi	Supporting role	SCTV
2007	Cinderella (Apakah Cinta Hanyalah Mimpi?)	Lulu	Supporting role	SCTV
2009	Air Mata Cinta	Shasha	Supporting role	RCTI
2010	Cinta Fitri (Musim Ramadhan 2)	Desi	Supporting role	SCTV
2012	Insya Allah Ada Jalan	Aisyah	Episode: "Azab Penjual Makanan Kadaluarsa"	SCTV
2012	Insya Allah Ada Jalan		Episode: "Jurangan Kontrakan Yang Kejam"	SCTV
2012	Jalan Ke Surga		Lead role	Indosiar
2012–2013	Si Biang Kelok Cilik	BiJe's teacher	Supporting role	SCTV
2013	Si Cemong	Fitria	Supporting role	SCTV

=== Film Television ===
Year	Title	Role	Notes
2013	Beradu Cinta di Kontrakan No. 23	Frida	Supporting role
2013	Cinta Kejar Tayang	Sari	Lead role
2013	Indahnya Cinta Pertama	Mrs. Tyas	Supporting role
2014	Petaka Tanah Kuburan	Sisca	Lead role
