= Ricky Harun =

Indonesian actor

- Born: Ricky Chilnady Pratama Harun; 12 January 1987 (age 39); Bandung, West Java, Indonesia
- Occupations: Celebrity, Model
- Spouse: Herfiza Novianti
- Children: 4
- Parent(s): Donna Harun and Ardy Gustav

Ricky Chilnady Pratama Harun (born 12 January 1987), better known as Ricky Harun is an Indonesian actor. He is the eldest son of Donna Harun and Ardy Gustav.

== Career ==
Harun was introduced to the entertainment industry at an early age through his mother. Initially, he did not intend to pursue a career in the field; however, he accepted an opportunity to appear in the Indonesian soap opera Pinokio dan Peri Biru (2005). Afterwards he starred in several soap operas, including Sherina with Eva Celia Latjuba, and Penjaga Hati.

His debut film was Rumah Pondok Indah (2006). This horror movie starred Arswendy Nasution, Chintami Atmanegara, Titi Qadarsih, Ruhut Sitompul, Asya Shara, and new entrants Amelia and Ricky Harun. In 2007, Ricky appeared again in a horror film, this time directed by Jose Purnomo, and titled Pulau Hantu.

== Personal life ==
Harun was previously in a relationship with actress Chelsea Olivia. The relationship was short-lived and ended amicably. He was later linked to Eva Celia Latjuba, daughter of actress Sophia Latjuba, before entering a brief relationship with Sheila Marcia. In June 2013, Harun married actress Herfiza Novianti. They have four children together.

== Filmography ==
=== Films ===
Year	Title	Role	Production
2006	Rumah Pondok Indah	Ian	Indika Entertainment
2007	Pulau Hantu	Dante	MVP Pictures
2008	Kawin Kontrak	Jody	MVP Pictures
2008	Syahadat Cinta		PT Piramid Citra Perkasa
2008	Kawin Kontrak Lagi	Jody	MVP Pictures
2009	Kirun + Adul	Kirun	MVP Pictures
2009	Ai Lop Yu Pul	Topan	Maleo Pictures
2010	Toilet 105	Okta	MVP Pictures
2011	Suster Keramas 2	Jack	Maxima Pictures
2012	Potong Bebek Angsa	Otong	Falcon Pictures
2013	Get M4rried		Starvision
2013	Slank Nggak Ada Matinya The Movie	Kaka Slank	Starvision
2014	Bajaj Bajuri The Movie	Ahmad Bajuri	Starvision
2015	PANGERAN	Starvision	
2015	99% Muhrim: Get Married 5	Jali	Starvision
2017	Demi Cinta	Bagus	MNC Pictures
2017	The Chocolate Chance	Juno Aswanda	Darihati Films
2017	From London to Bali	Lukman	Starvision Plus

=== FTV ===
- Mak Comblang Jatuh Cinta (with Yuniza Icha and Nikita Willy)
- Sorry I Love You (with Dhea Lestari)
- 17 Hari Mencari Cinta
- Yang Muda Bercinta (with Yuniza Icha)
- Cinta Aku Dan Mama (with Yuniza Icha and Samuel Zylgwyn)
- Ratu Cinta Kilat (with Nikita Willy)
- Bukan Buaya Darat
- Pacar yang Lupa Punya Pacar (with Nikita Willy)
- Pacar Gue Buaya Darat (with Nikita Willy, Seikha Wedya, Riskyna Wulan and Aji Yusman)
- Playboy Kantoran (with Ayu Hastari)

=== Television ===
- Inikah Rasanya
- Pinokio & Peri Biru (first indonovela aired in the Philippines)
- Penjaga Hati
- Sherina
- Rindu Milik Rangga
- Hitam Putih
- Timur Cinta
- Dia atau Diriku
- Si Biang Kerok
- Si Biang Kerok Cilik
- ABG Jadi Manten
- Emak Ijah Pengen Ke Mekah
- Ganteng Ganteng Serigala
- Pangeran
- Julaiha Princess Betawi
- Cinta Dari Surga
- Insya Allah Syurga
- 3 Mas Ketir

== Music video ==
- Hafizah by (Sembilan Band)
- Ku Tetap Menanti by (Nikita Willy)
