= Kiki Farrel =

Indonesian actor

- Born: 26 May 1985 (age 40); Jakarta, Indonesia
- Occupations: Actor; singer

Kiki Farrel (born May 26, 1985) is an Indonesian actor. Farrel began his career by working as an extra in a number of sitcoms, and eventually participated in the Supermama Selebconcert with his mother, Mama Dahlia. He starred in the soap opera Cinta Kirana.

== Filmography ==
=== TV series ===
Year	Title	Role	Notes	Network
2006	Bukan Diriku			RCTI
2006	Love	Dika	Supporting role	SCTV
2007	Cinderella (Apakah Cinta Hanyalah Mimpi?)	Davin	Supporting role	SCTV
2007	Cinta			
2008	Cinta Kirana	Baim	Supporting role	Indosiar
2008	Cinta Intan			SCTV
2009	Andra Cari Cinta	Anwar	Supporting role	SCTV
2009	Terlanjur Cinta	Dirga	Lead role	SCTV
2010	Dimana Melani?	Pasya Utama	Lead role	SCTV
2012	Tukang Bubur Naik Haji The Series	Firman	Guest star	RCTI
2012	Insya Allah Ada Jalan		Episode: "Artis Yang Tersesat"	SCTV
2013	Haji Medit	Samsul	Lead role	SCTV
2013	Istri Istri Suamiku		Supporting role	Indosiar
2014	Putri Pete	Jelmaan Bebek	Supporting role	MNCTV
2015	3 Semprul Mengejar Surga 3	Fahri	Supporting role	SCTV

=== TV movies ===
- Mercy Milik Joko
- Cintaku Selegit Dodol (SCTV 2009)
- Cinta Dalam Segelas Blueberry
- Dicari Pendamping Wisuda (SCTV 2010)
- Pemandu Cinta Dari Citarik (SCTV 2010)
- Pangeran Salju Dan Putri Arang (August 20, 2012)
- Cinta Bersemi di 22 Hari (SCTV September 2, 2012)
- Sumpah I Love Bakso (SCTV November 24, 2012)
- Jujur Baskara (RCTI - November 24, 2012)
- Love In Warteg (RCTI - January 8, 2013)
- From Udik With Love (SCTV January 27, 2013)
- Cinta Si Biang Onar (November 7, 2012)
- Sicantik Ketemu Cinta (SCTV November 27, 2012)
- Kucuci Cintamu (SCTV January 8, 2013)
- Ketusuk Paku Cinta Tukang Tambal Ban (SCTV 2012)
- Jaka Tarub Mencari Kucing Anggora SCTV 2012
- Benci Tapi Cinta (SCTV August 8, 2013)
- Catatan Bodyguard Si Boy (TRANSTV 2013)
- Hutan Belakang Sekolah (TRANSTV 2013)
- Boss Doni (KompasTV 2013)
