= Suster Keramas =

- Directed by: Helfi Kardit
- Written by: Abbe Ac
- Produced by: Ody Mulya Hidayat
- Starring: Herfiza Novianti; Rin Sakuragi; Rizky Mocil; Zidni Adam; Shinta Bachir
- Cinematography: Nofi SY Kardit
- Edited by: Aziz Natandra
- Music by: Joseph S. Djafar
- Distributed by: Maxima Pictures
- Release date: December 31, 2009
- Running time: 82 minutes
- Country: Indonesia
- Language: Indonesia

Suster Keramas is a 2009 adult horror comedy film From Indonesia, produced by Maxima Pictures and distributed by Maleo Pictures. The film was directed by Helfi Kardit and starred Herfiza Novianti as Kayla, Shinta Bachir as Jeng Dollie and Rin Sakuragi as Mitchiko.

== Plot ==
The film is about a Japanese tourist (Rin Sakuragi) to hand over a gift from her deceased father to his former Indonesian nurse. She was unaware that the nurse had perished and become a malevolent spirit. Meanwhile, three friends, Kayla, Barry, and Ariel, are disturbed by the ghost of a nurse.

== Cast ==
- Herfiza Novianti as Kayla
- Rin Sakuragi as Michiko
- Shinta Bachir as Jeng Dolly
- Yadi Sembako as Mang Odong
- Alex Abbad as Roy Konak
- Rizky Mocil as Barry
- Zidni Adam as Ariel
- Bella Esperance as Suster
- Kitti Katrina as Ibu Tiri Kayla

== Production ==
Filming was done in Puncak, Bogor.

== Release ==
Suster Keramas was released in Indonesia on 31 December 2009 and sold more than 800,000 tickets, compared to other local films at the time that were unlikely to sell even 300,000 tickets. However, the film was controversial in Indonesia because of its sexual aspects.
