= Galih Ginanjar =

Indonesian actor (born 1988)

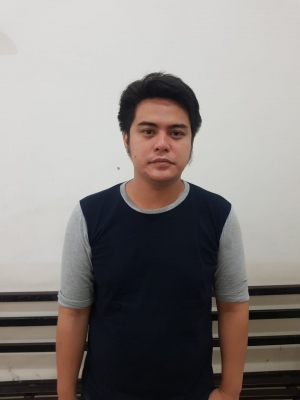
- Born: Garut, Indonesia
- Occupation: Actor
- Years active: 2006–present
- Spouses: Fairuz A Rafiq (m. 2011–2014) Barbie Kumalasari (m. 2015–2020)
- Children: King Faaz Arafiq

Galih Ginanjar (born in Garut, West Java, Indonesia) is an Indonesian actor. He played Rasya in the soap opera Cinderella (Apakah Cinta Hanyalah Mimpi?).

== Personal life ==
On March 5, 2011 Ginanjar married Fairuz A Rafiq. On 2 April 2012, Ginanjar had a child named King Faaz Arafiq. Ginanjar married Barbie Kumalasari in 2015.

== Filmography ==
=== TV series ===
- Cinderella (Apakah Cinta Hanyalah Mimpi?) (2007)
- Bunga (2007)
- Kasih dan Amara (2008–2009)
- Pelangi
- Hafizah (2009)
- Tangan Tangan Mungil (2013)
