= Honda S660 =

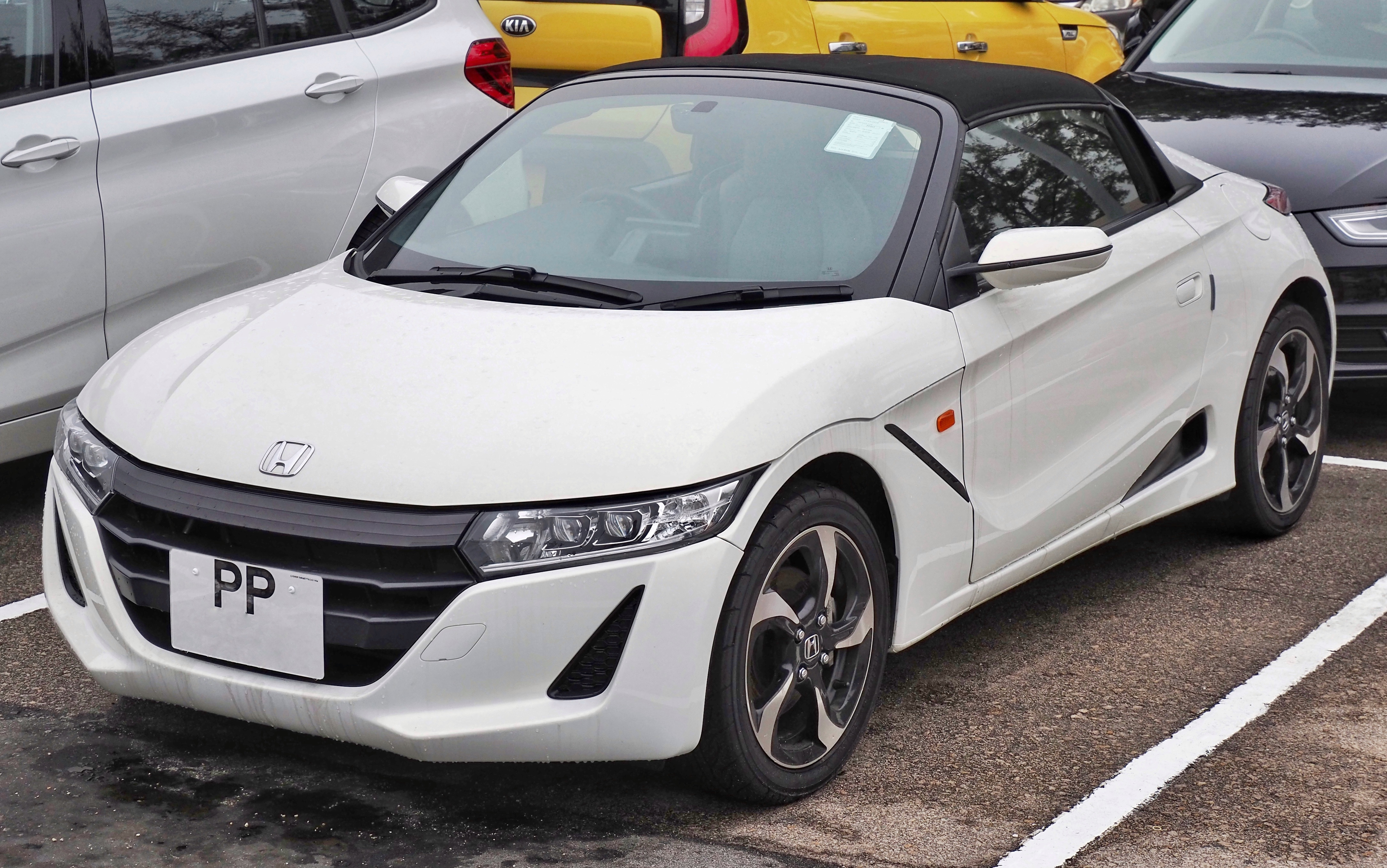
- 2015 Honda S660 α

Overview
- Manufacturer: Honda
- Model code: JW5
- Production: April 2015 – March 2022
- Assembly: Japan: Yokkaichi, Mie
- Designer: Ryo Sugiura

Body and chassis
- Class: Kei car
- Body style: 2-door targa top
- Layout: Transverse mid-engine, rear-wheel-drive
- Related: Honda N-Box; Honda N-One; Honda N-WGN

Powertrain
- Engine: 658 cc S07A turbo I3
- Power output: 47 kW (63 hp; 64 PS)
- Transmission: 6-speed manual or; CVT with 7-speed simulation

Dimensions
- Wheelbase: 2,285 mm (90.0 in)
- Length: 3,395 mm (133.7 in)
- Width: 1,475 mm (58.1 in)
- Height: 1,180 mm (46.5 in)
- Curb weight: 830–850 kg (1,830–1,874 lb)

Chronology
- Predecessor: Honda Beat

The Honda S660 is a sports car in the kei class manufactured by the Japanese company Honda from 2015 until 2022. It is a two-seater with a targa top and a transverse mid-engine and rear-wheel-drive layout. It is the successor to the Honda Beat (with regard to segment), and the Honda S2000 (with regard to nomenclature, as it also belongs to Honda's family of "S" models).

== Overview ==
The S660 is a lightweight mid-engined roadster with a targa roof. Its dimensions, due to kei car size restrictions, are nearly identical to the 1990s Beat. It is sold with either a 6-speed manual transmission or a 7-speed CVT with sports paddle shifters, both options being offered on the two trims available (Alpha and Beta). The S660 weighs approximately 830 kg with the manual transmission and 850 kg with the CVT, and has a front/rear weight balance of 45/55.

The naming convention of using the letter "S" followed by the engine displacement is a long-held Honda tradition going back to Honda's second production car, the Honda S500 (from which the S660 draws inspiration).

== Performance ==
The S660 is powered by the same turbocharged 658 cc S07A Turbo engine used in the N-One with some minor mechanical improvements. In the S660, this engine is mid-mounted and produces 64 PS (47 kW; 63 hp) at 6,000 rpm and 104 N⋅m (77 lb⋅ft) of torque at 2,600 rpm with a redline of 7,700 rpm for the manual transmission and 7,000 rpm for the CVT.

== Development and launch ==
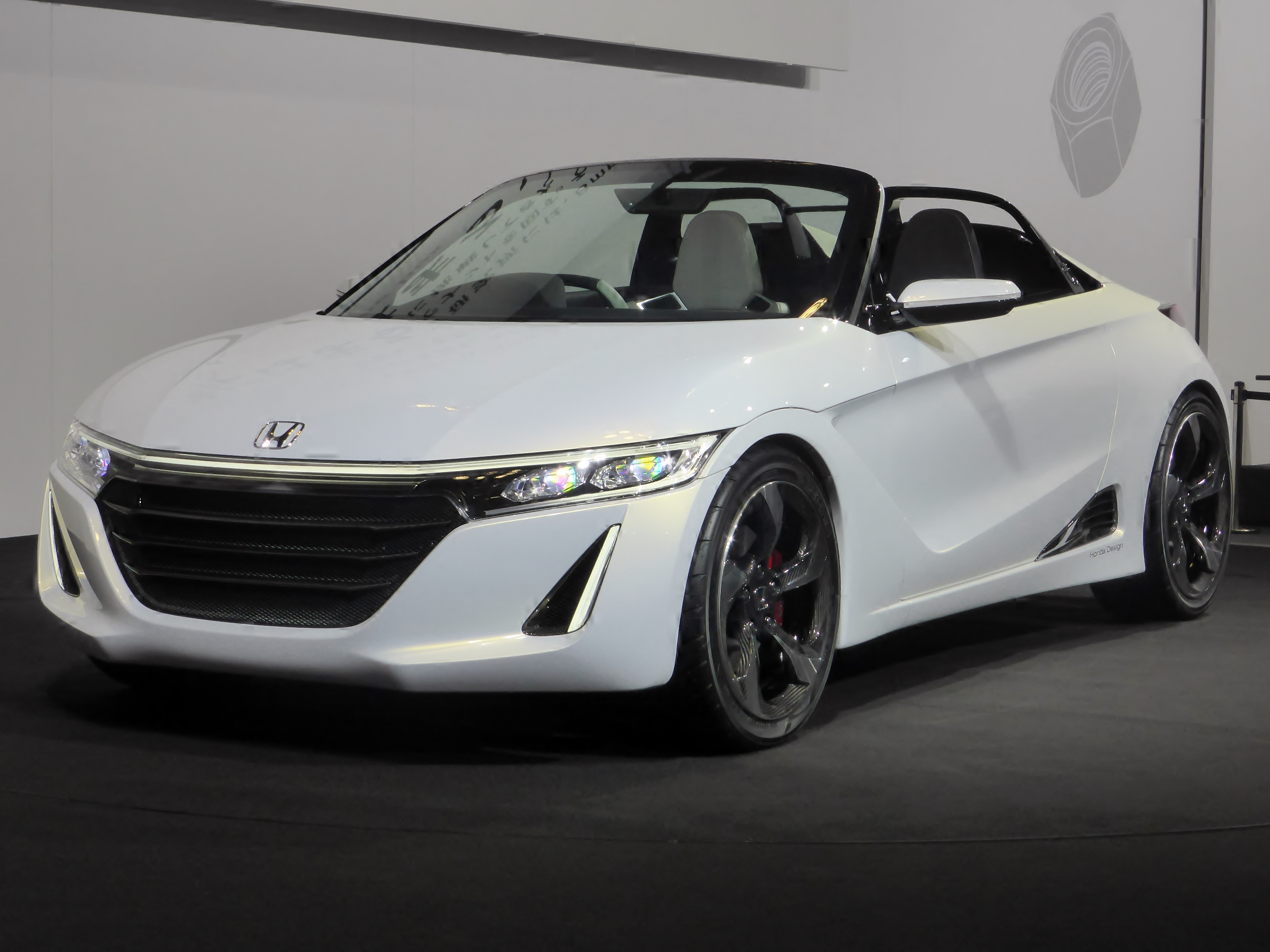

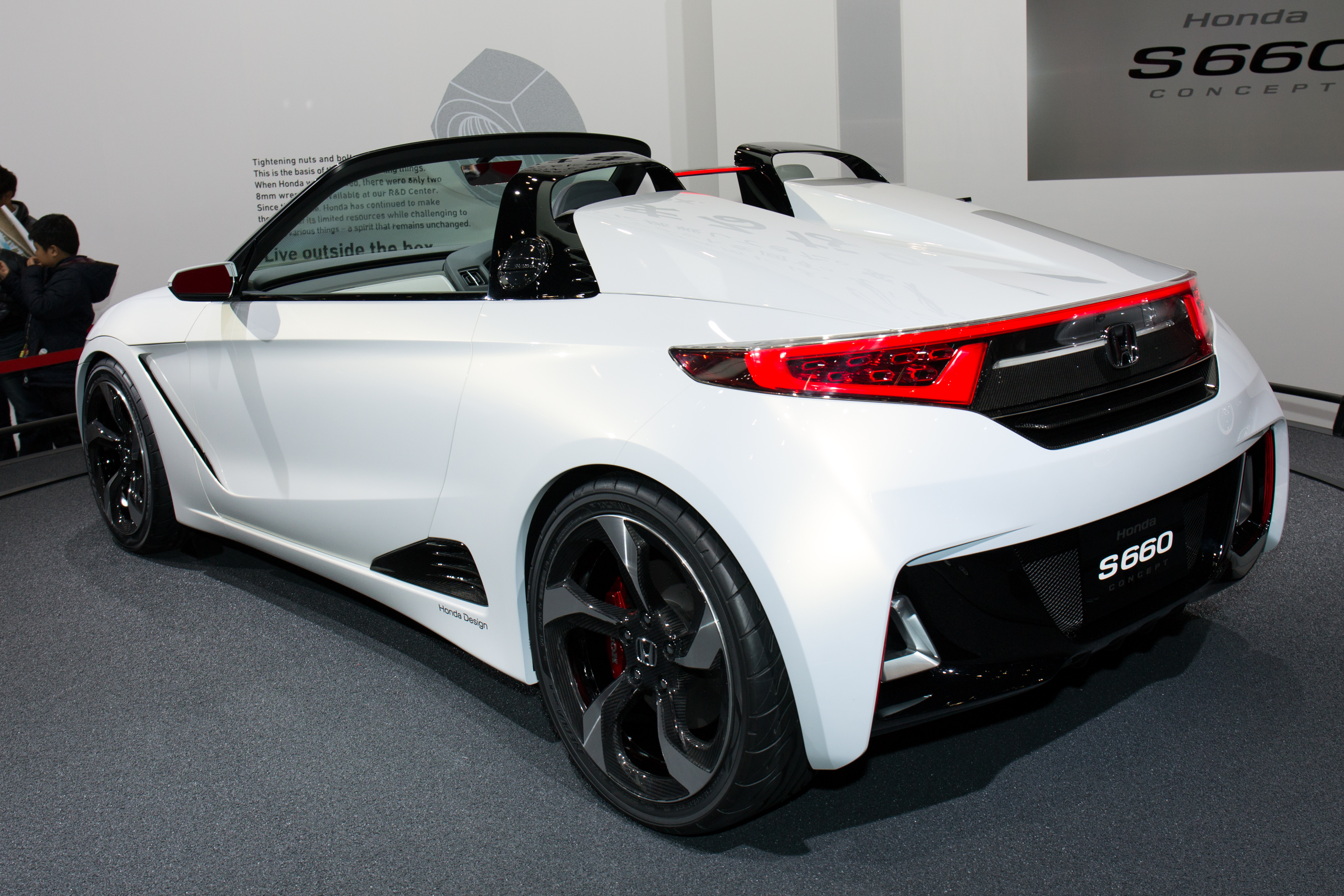
The Honda S660 Concept

The development team of the S660 was led by Ryo Mukumoto, who beat out 400 other participants in Honda's in-house competition at the age of 22. Honda made him the youngest lead engineer in the company's history in spite of his lack of engineering experience, and he was given 5 years to develop the S660.

The exterior design is based on the Honda EV-STER, unveiled at the 42nd Tokyo Motor Show in 2011 as a "next-generation electric small sports concept model." It has been redesigned for a kei car, and is inspired by the Honda S660 CONCEPT. A prototype was shown at the November 2013 Tokyo Motor Show. The prototype and proposed production announcement were widely covered in auto enthusiast news sites and blogs. Initial reactions to the concept were favorable.

=== First photographs ===
The prototype S660 was photographed by car enthusiasts at a wintertime car event in early 2015 and published in the Japanese car enthusiast magazine Mag-X, and subsequently republished in the US car blog The Truth About Cars. The pictures included several exterior photos and one of the opened engine compartments.

== Production ==
The Honda S660 was released on April 2, 2015. At the same time, a special limited edition car, the "S660 CONCEPT EDITION," was released on the same day, limited to 660 units, to commemorate the release. S660 Concept Edition is based on the Honda S660 CONCEPT unveiled at the 43rd Tokyo Motor Show in 2013. Available with a 7-speed paddle-shift CVT (Continuously Variable Transmission). After the S660 entered the market, its first driving review was in June 2015 of a Japanese-market prototype driven by Top Gear in Tokyo.

The lineup consists of two types: the "β" (Beta) and the high-end "α." (Alpha). The "α" comes with exclusive equipment such as cruise control, stainless steel sports pedals, a leather-wrapped steering wheel, a leather-wrapped MT shift knob or CVT selector lever, and sports leather seats, as well as chrome-plated interior parts.

S660 Modulo X released in May 25, 2018. The exterior features a dedicated front bumper with an integrated grille that uses air guide fins to direct the wind to the desired position, and a rear active spoiler with a "Gurney flap" that matches the aerodynamic characteristics of the dedicated front bumper, pursuing aerodynamic performance.

The S660 got minor changes in January 2020. On the exterior, the front pillars are the same color as the body, and new aluminum wheels and a front grille have been adopted. The higher grade "α" is now equipped with new accessory lights. The colors of the headlight sub-reflectors and the inner lenses of the rear combination lamps have also been changed. Interior features Alcantara on the steering wheel and shift knob, while the Alpha model features new accents on the seat upholstery and is now equipped with seat heaters. "Modulo X" has a new exterior finish for the aluminum wheels, a new black sputtering finish, and door mirror covers in Night Hole Black Pearl. The interior features a special Alcantara and genuine leather steering wheel, and Alcantara has been expanded to include the handbrake cover and shift boot, and the design of the special sports leather seats has been changed.

Top Gear opined that the car was "supremely maneuverable" but lacked power, something an export model with a larger motor could amend, and felt that such an export model might be a potential Mazda MX-5 competitor.

=== Final edition and discontinuation ===
Honda Motor Co., Ltd. announced on March 12, 2021, that it will discontinue production of the S660 in March 2022. Honda launched its final edition, S600 Modulo X Version Z. The exterior emblems (H mark (front and rear), vehicle name emblem, special rear emblem) have been changed to a black chrome finish, the special active spoiler (with Gurney flap) has been painted black, and the aluminum wheels have been painted stealth black. The interior panels (meter visor panel, passenger air outlet panel, center console panel) have been changed to a carbon-look finish, the door lining panels have been changed to lux suede and synthetic leather/black with burgundy red and gray stitching, and a special seat center bag (with Modulo X logo) and an aluminum console plate with a special Version Z logo have been added.

Production of the S660 ended in March 2022.

Partial production by year:

- 2015: 9,296
- 2016: 10,298
- 2017: 4,075
- 2018–2022: 3,000 or fewer each year.

== Gallery ==
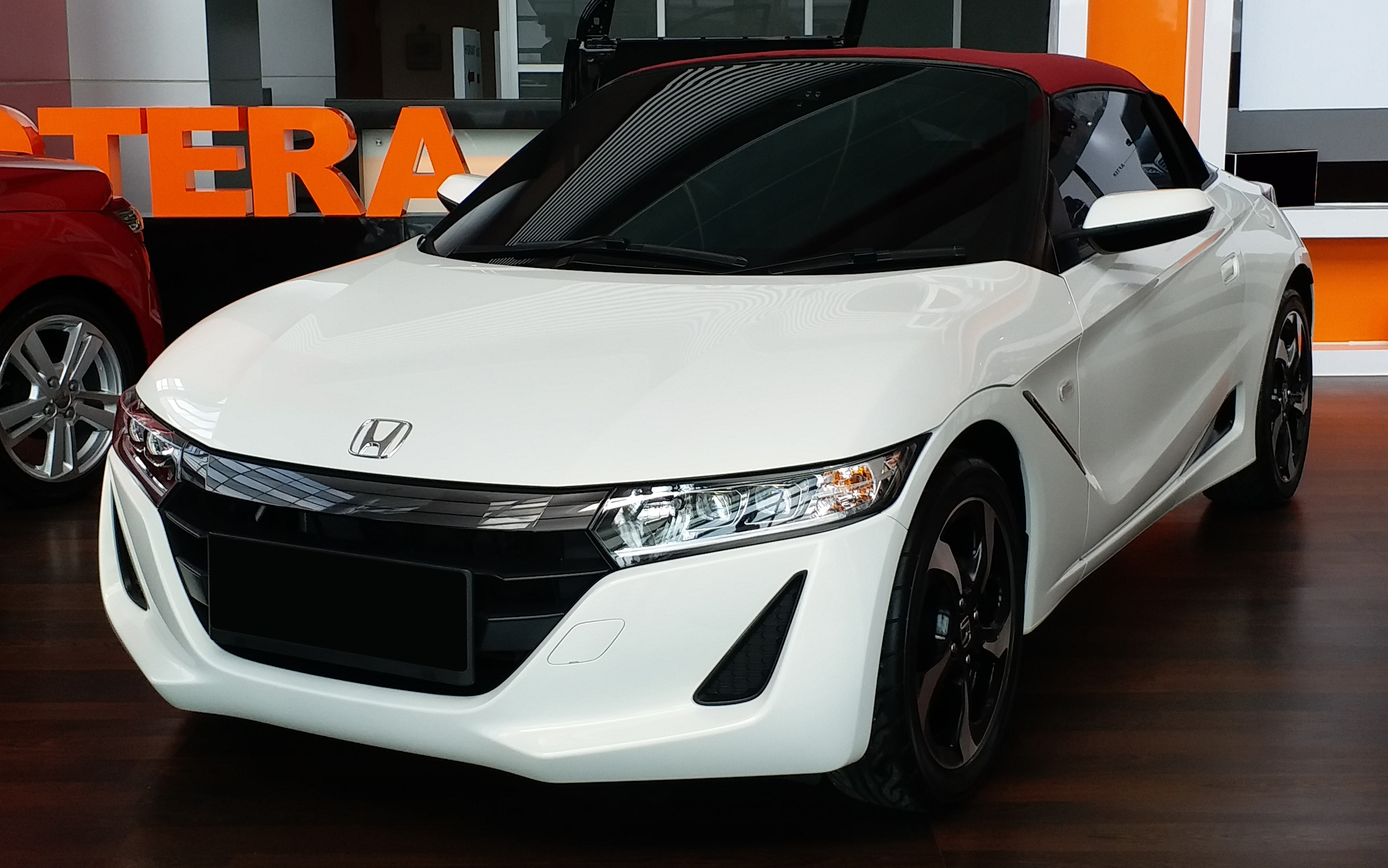
Honda S660 Concept Edition

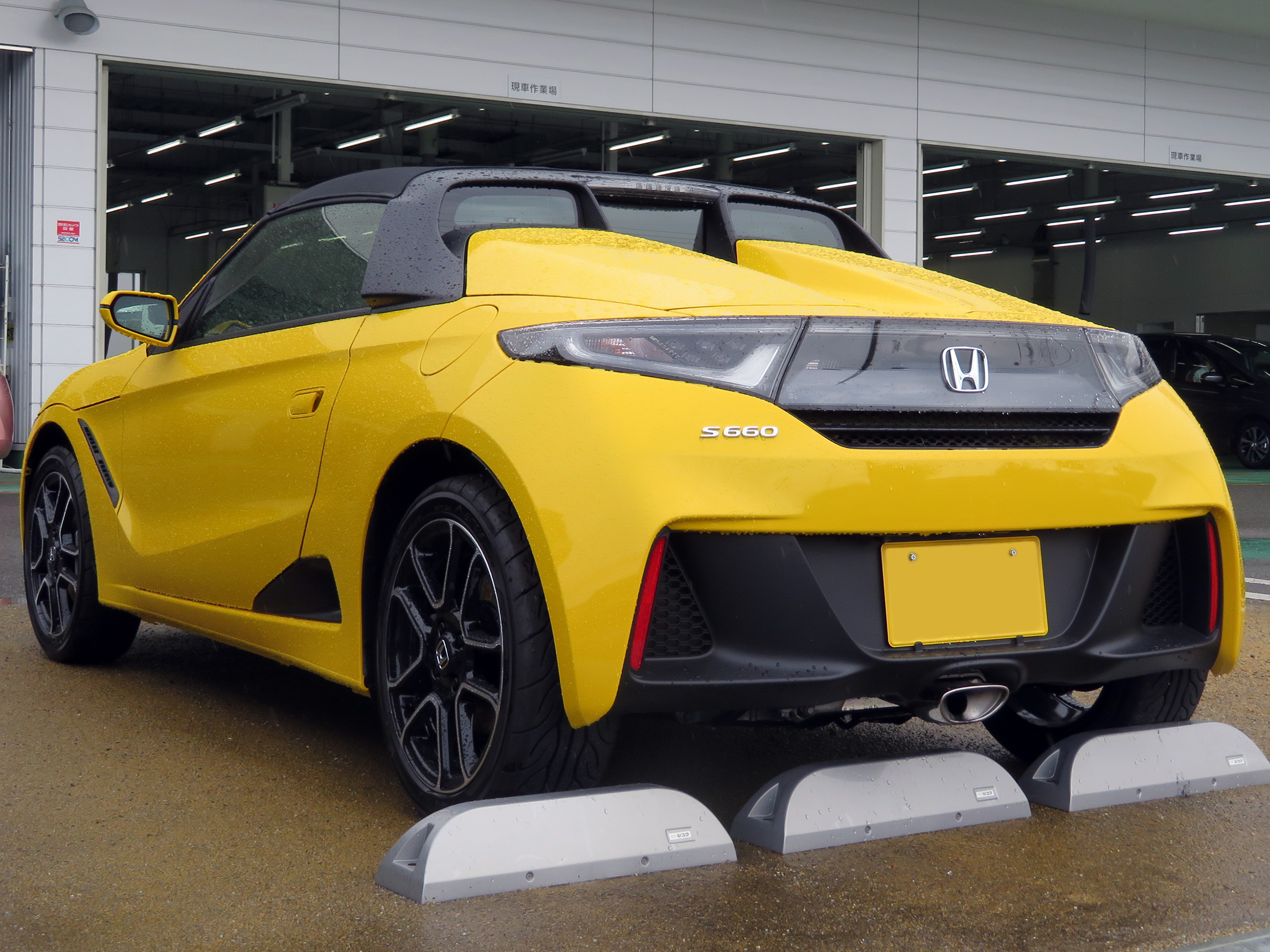
Honda S660 α

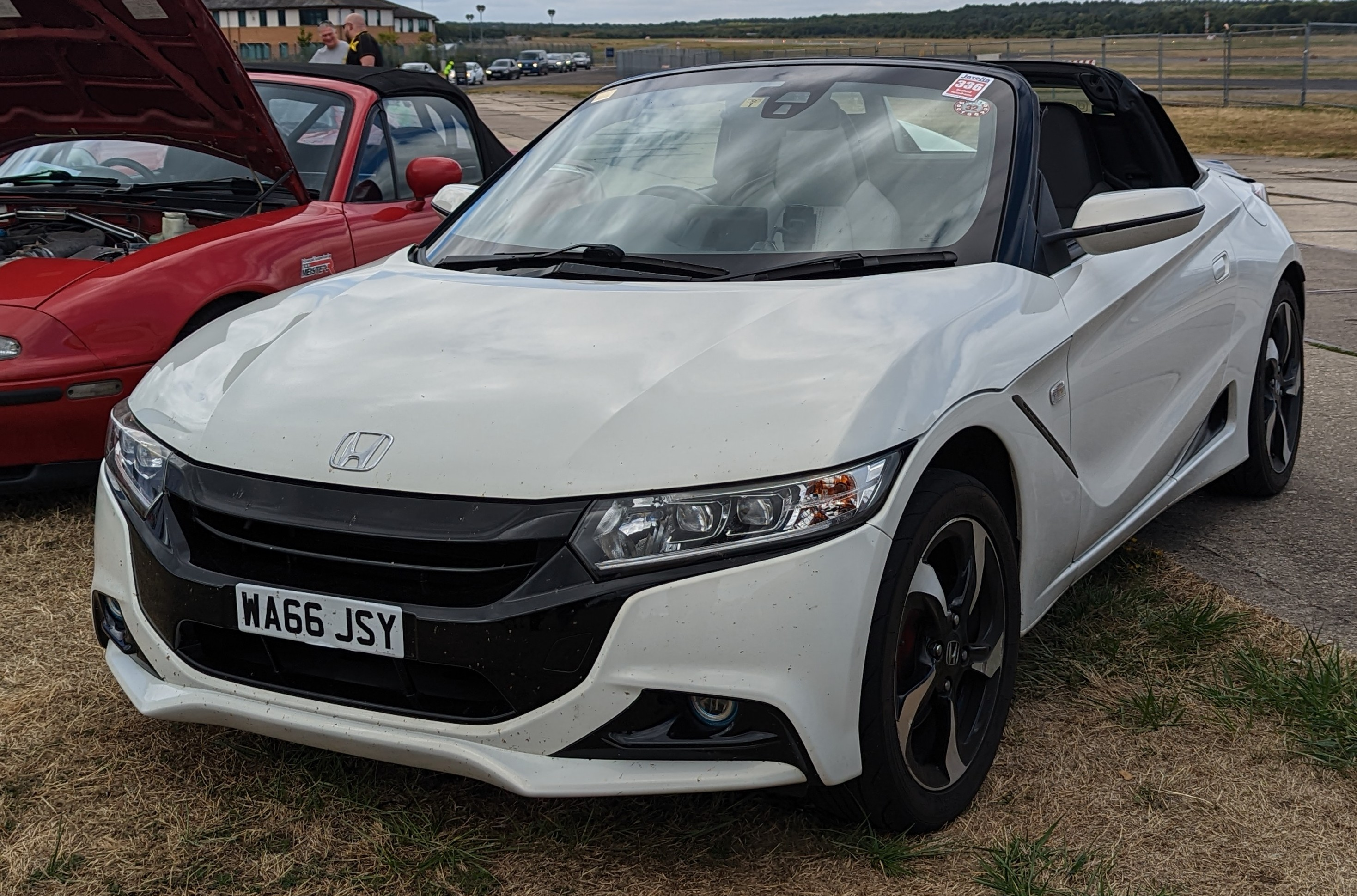
Honda S660 Modulo

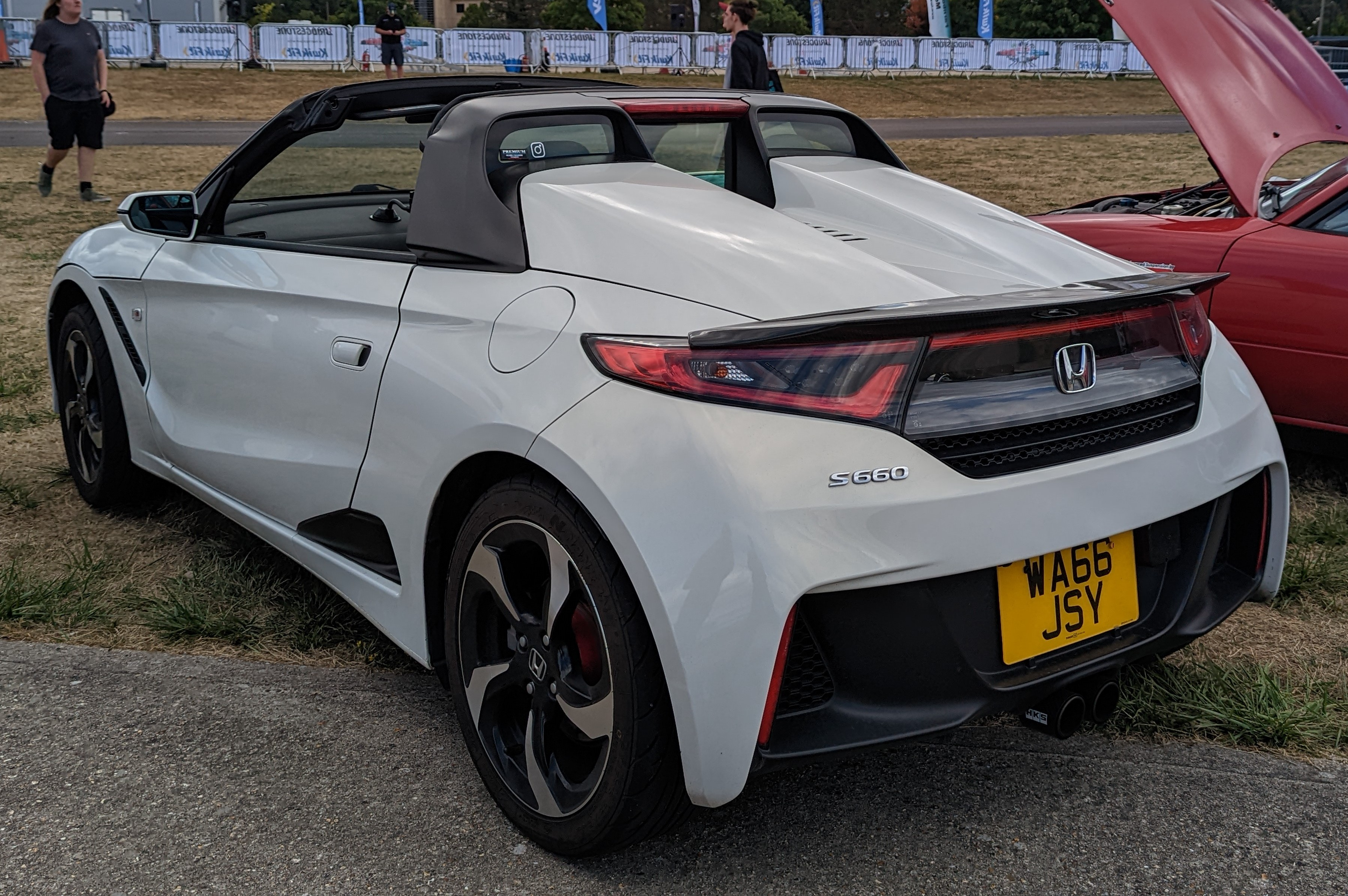
Honda S660 Modulo

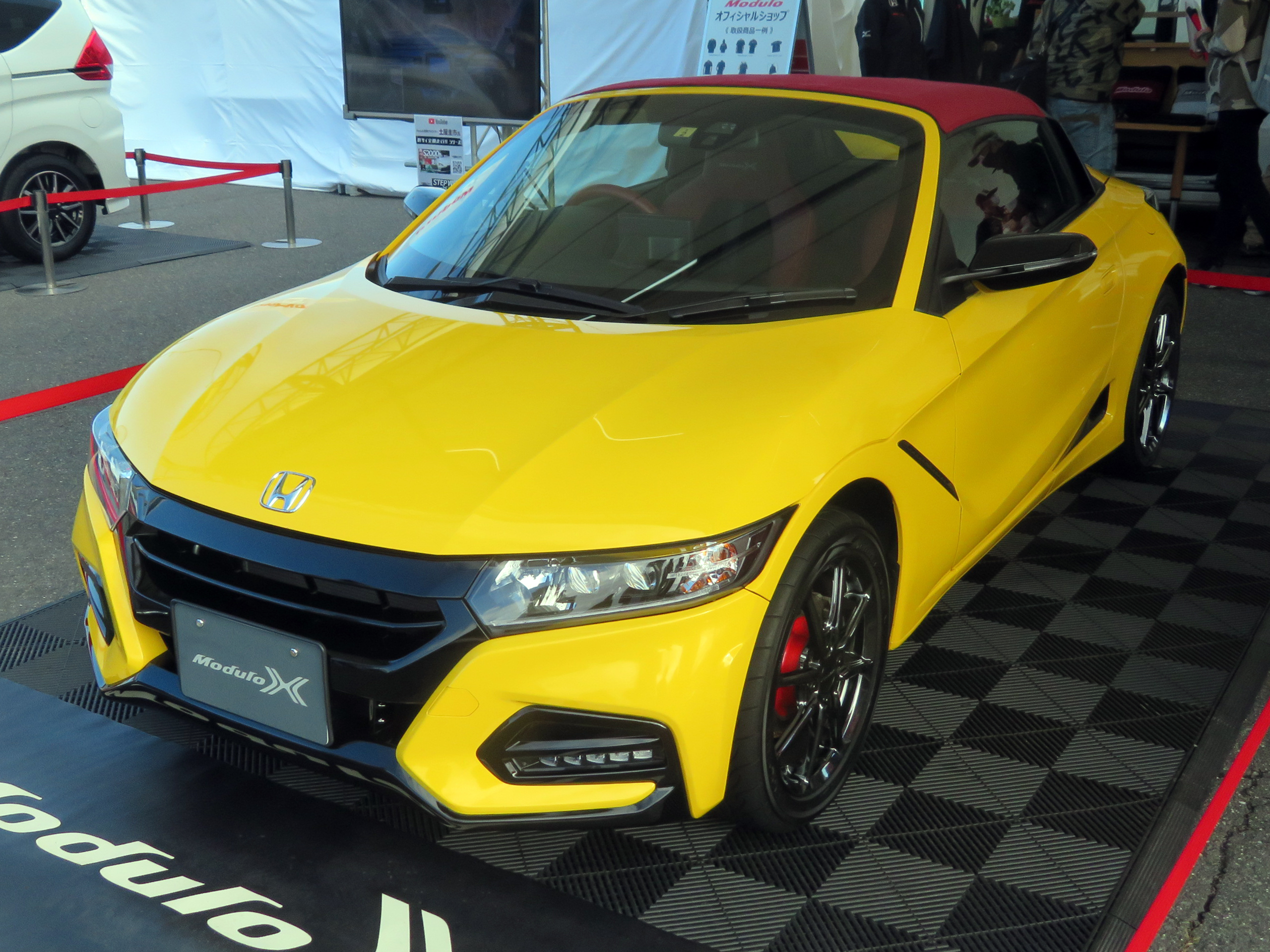
Honda S660 Modulo X

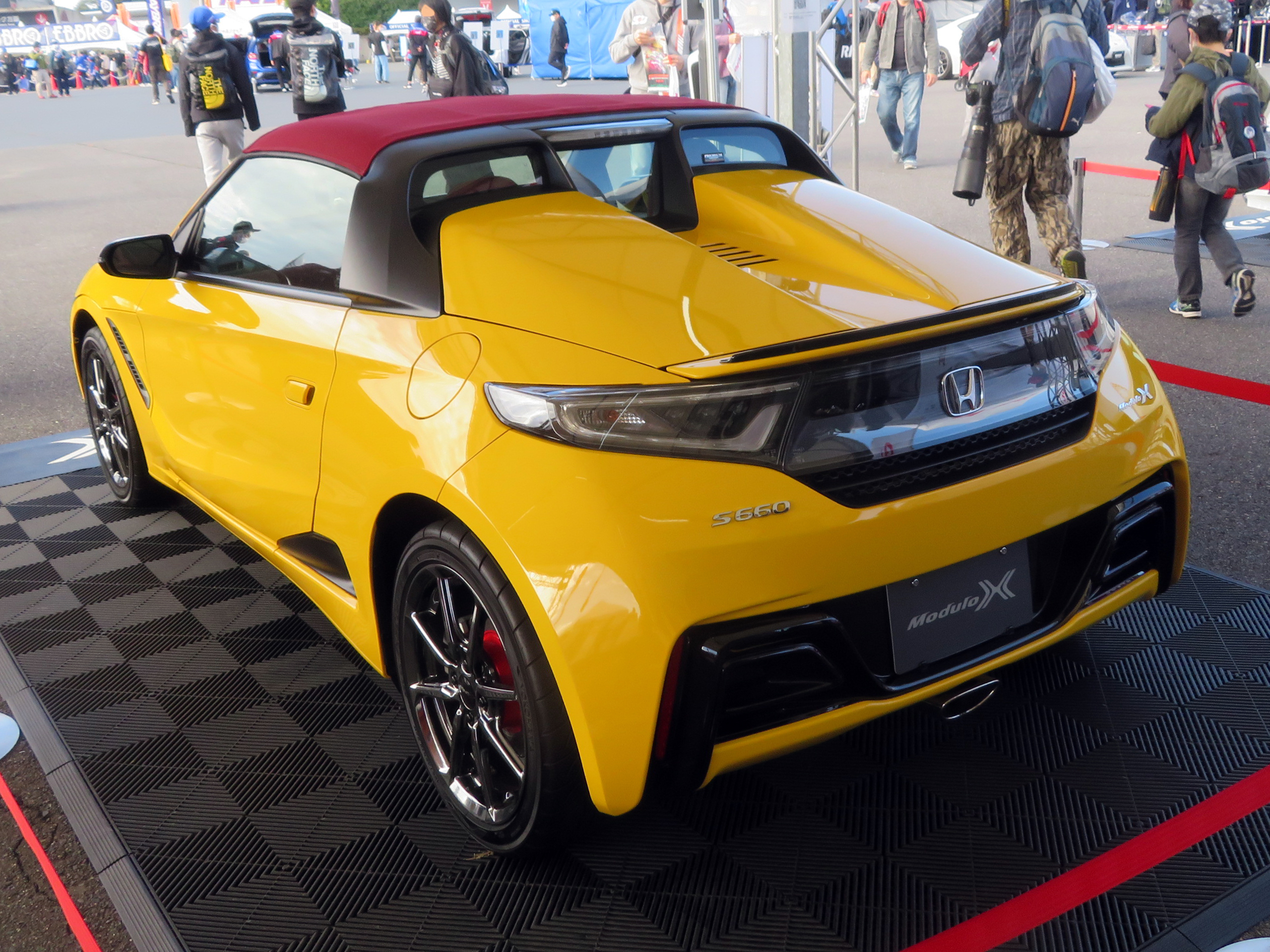
Honda S660 Modulo X

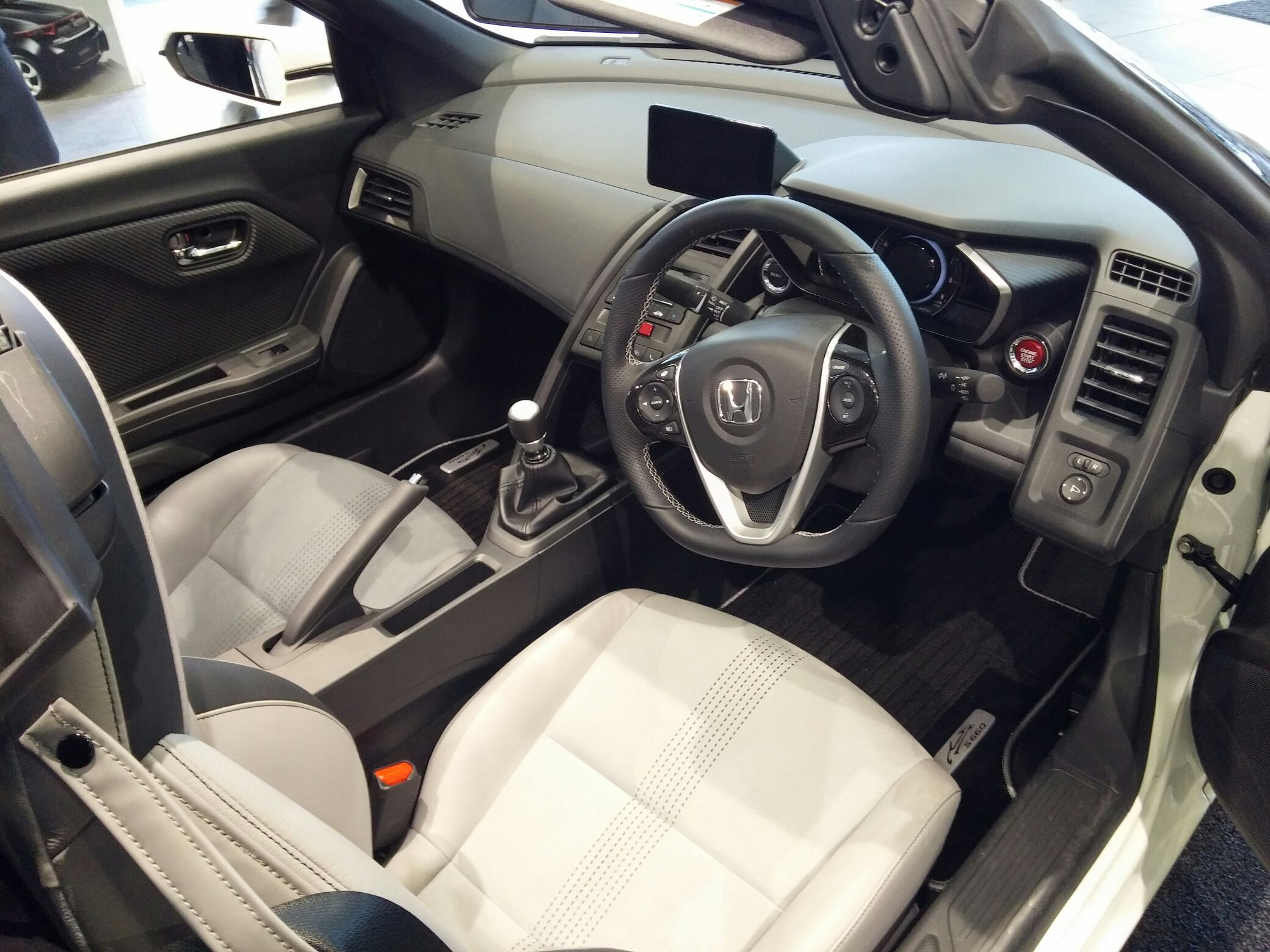
Interior

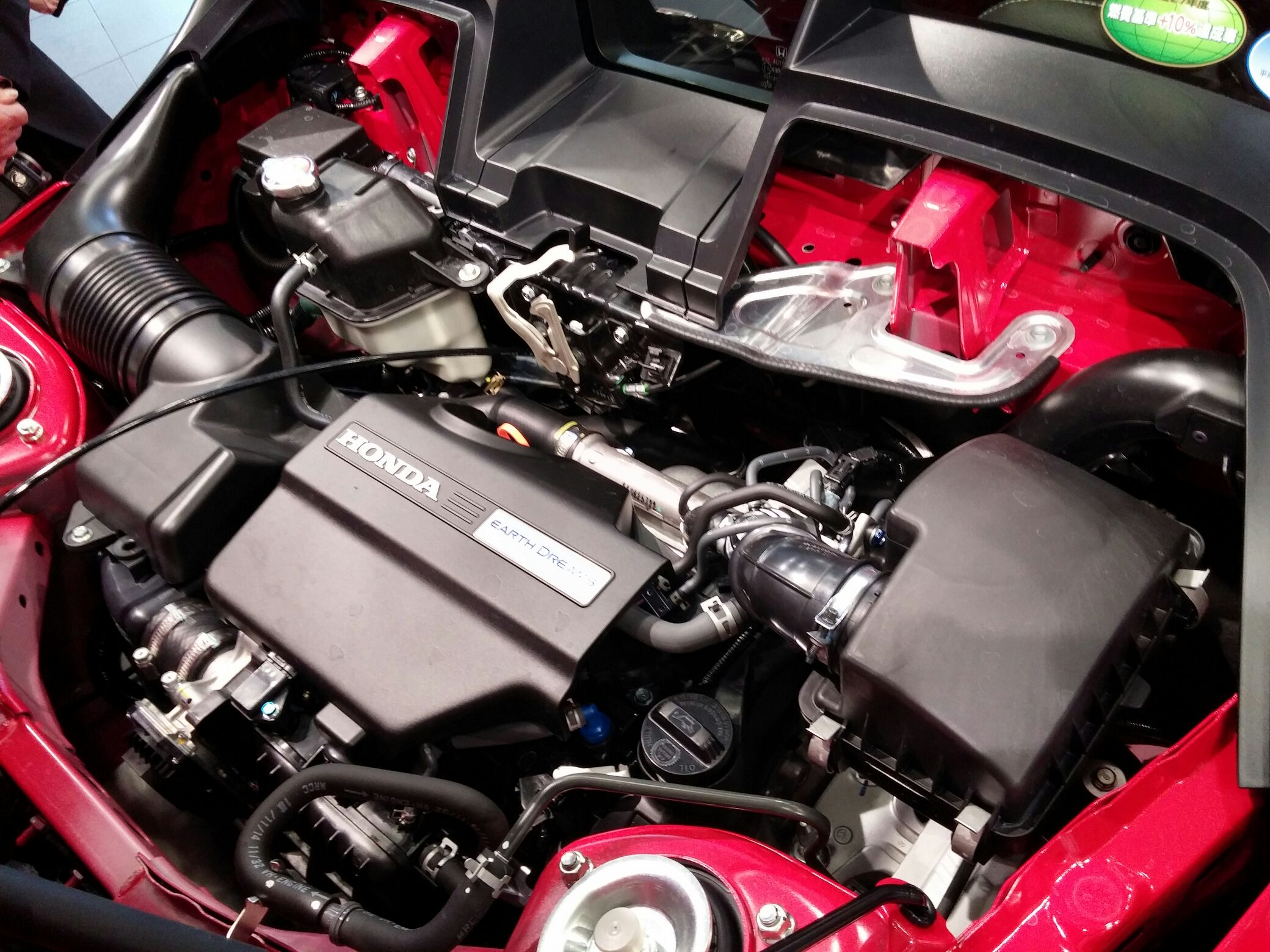
S07A Turbo engine
