= Honda Beat =

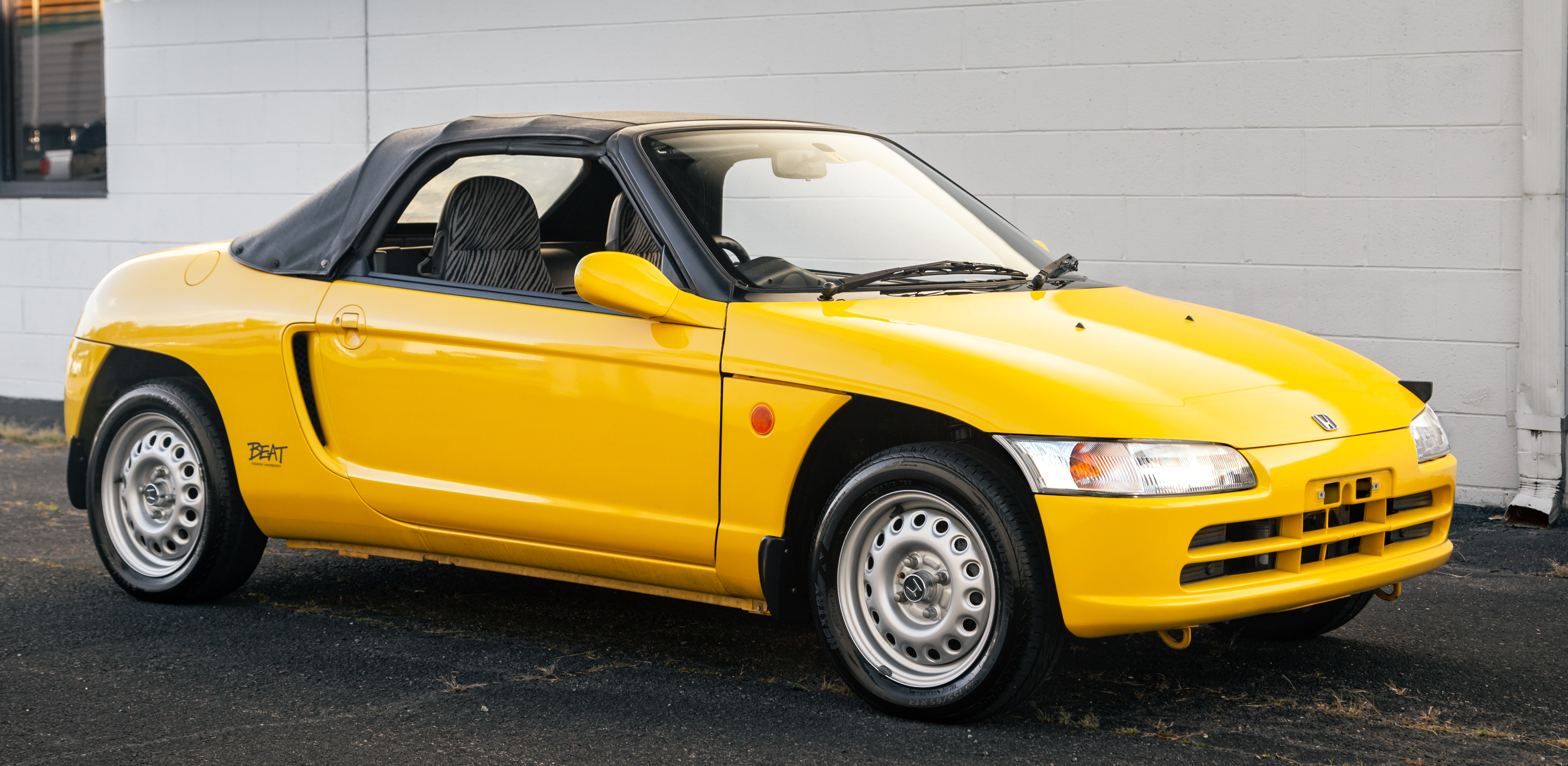

Overview
- Manufacturer: Honda
- Model code: PP1
- Production: May 1991– February 1996
- Assembly: Suzuka Plant, Suzuka, Mie, Japan
- Designer: Pavel Hušek at Pininfarina

Body and chassis
- Class: Kei car
- Body style: 2-door roadster
- Layout: Transverse mid-engine, rear-wheel drive

Powertrain
- Engine: 656 cc (40.0 cu in) E07A MTREC I3
- Transmission: 5-speed manual

Dimensions
- Wheelbase: 2,280 mm (90 in)
- Length: 3,295 mm (129.7 in)
- Width: 1,395 mm (54.9 in)
- Height: 1,175 mm (46.3 in)
- Curb weight: 760 kg (1,680 lb)

Chronology
- Successor: Honda S660

The Honda Beat is a kei car produced by the Japanese company Honda from May 1991 until February 1996. It is a two-seater roadster with a rear mid-engine, rear-wheel-drive layout. It was the last car to be approved by Soichiro Honda, before he died in 1991. In total around 33,600 were made, with roughly two-thirds of these built in the first year of production. The design of the car originated from Pininfarina, who then sold the design plan to Honda. The Honda Beat was one of many cars designed to take advantage of Japan's tax-efficient kei car class.

== History ==
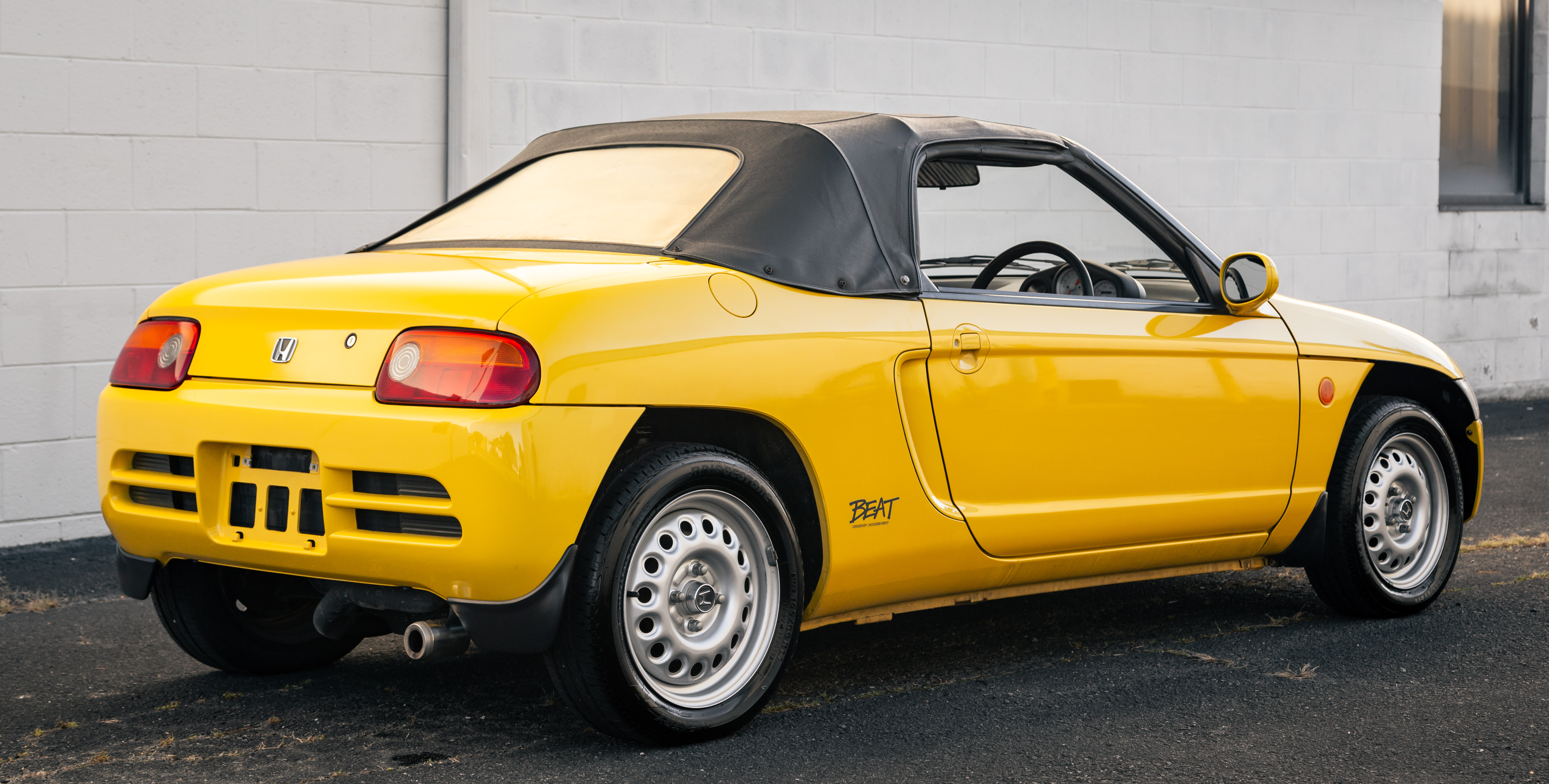
Rear view

There were two mainstream models of the Beat (the PP1–100 and the PP1–110) and a couple of limited edition versions. Variations on the first model were just cosmetic updates. Only the second model had any real mechanical differences. All cars were offered with the option of a driver-side airbag. The car was marketed by Honda as "Midship Amusement" and was sold exclusively in Japan, at Honda Primo dealership sales channels.

In typical Honda fashion, the Beat's engine did not use a turbocharger or supercharger. The 656 cc (40.0 cu in) engine was modified with the MTREC (Multi Throttle Responsive Engine Control) system, with individual throttle bodies for each of the three cylinders, to produce 64 PS (63 bhp) at 8,100 rpm with an electronically-limited top speed of 135 km/h (84 mph). Only a 5-speed manual transmission was available. The MTREC design would filter down to the 1993 Honda Today kei car. The Beat was the first kei car to feature disc brakes on all four wheels.

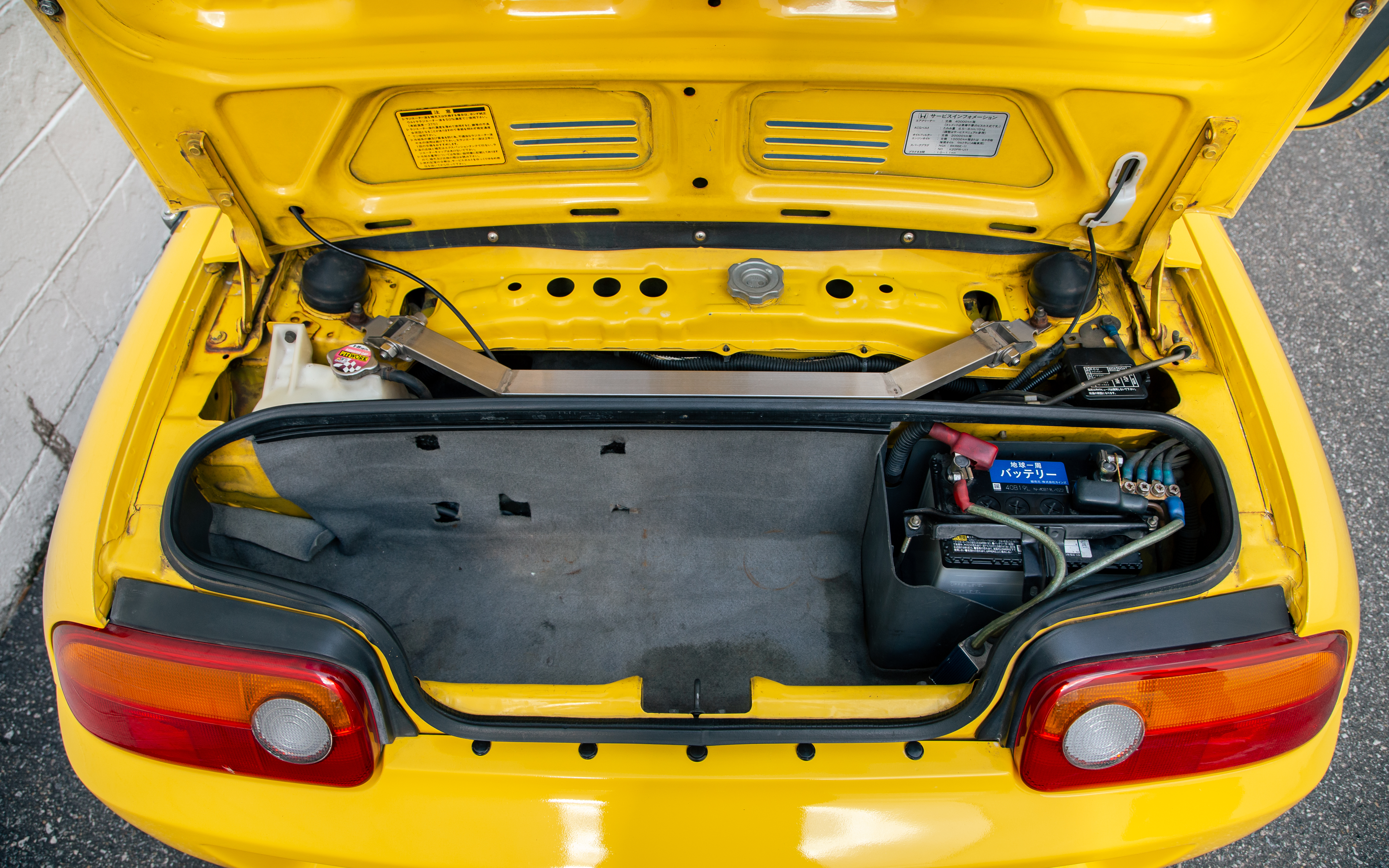
The relatively limited rear trunk of the Beat

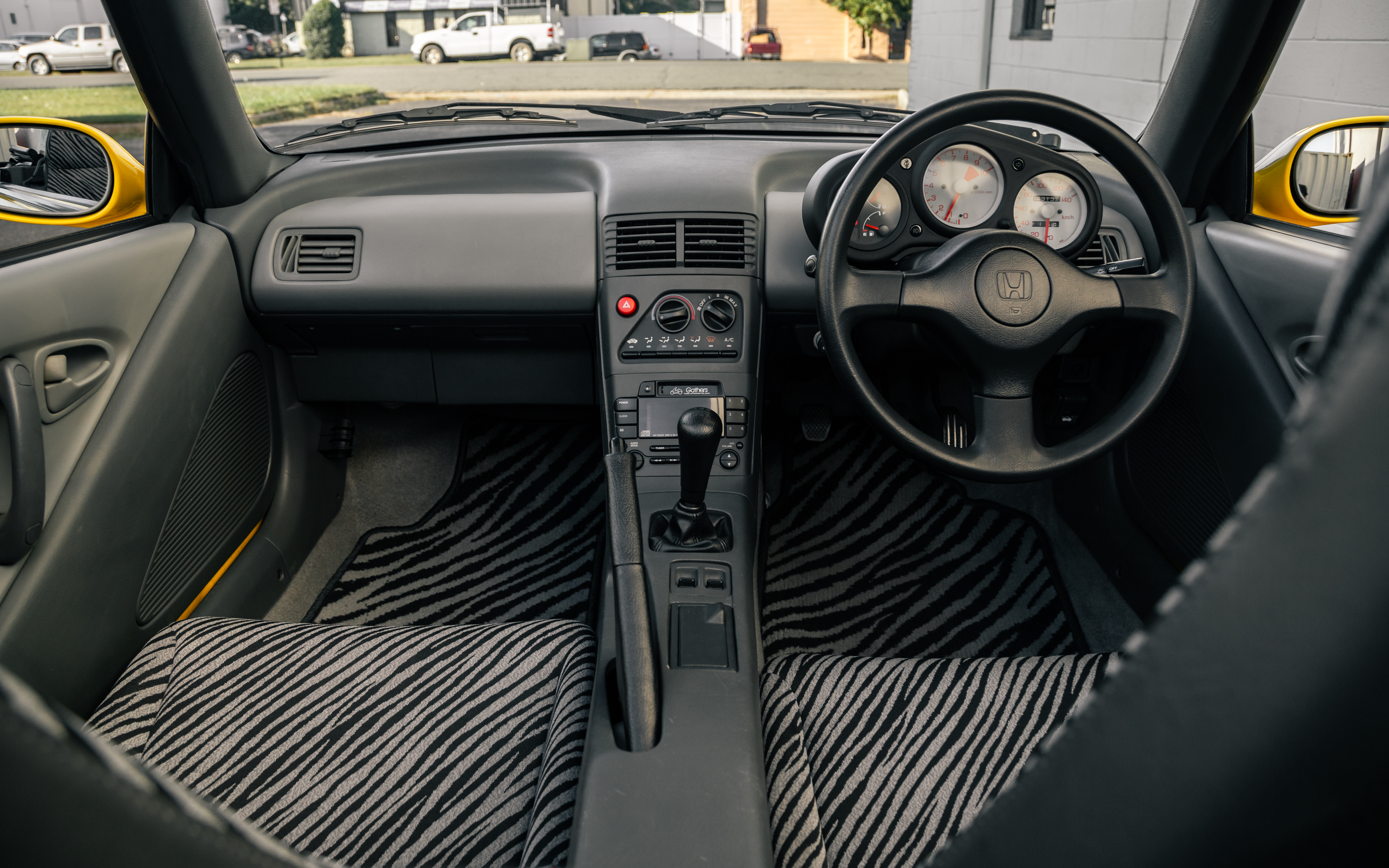
Interior

The Beat was part of a wave of kei car-sized sports cars in the early 1990s; its competitors included the Suzuki Cappuccino and Mazda's Autozam AZ-1. Together they anticipated the arrival of the Smart Roadster over a decade later, while Japan would not see a new model of the genre until the 2002 Daihatsu Copen.

On May 9, 2010, a parade was held in the Twin Ring Motegi circuit as a part of an annual Beat owners meeting. 569 Honda Beats participated in the parade, which is certified by Guinness World Records as the largest parade of Honda cars. The record was shown in the 2011 edition of Guinness World Records.

== Versions ==
Various versions:
Standard Equipment: air conditioning, power windows, 3-point seat belt, sun visor, front stabilizer, front laminated glass, side-toughened glass, halogen head lamps, soft top, steel wheels.

1992.02: The Beat Version F features the Aztec Green Pearl color and alloy wheels.
1992.05: The Beat Version C features the Captiva Blue Pearl color and white alloy wheels.
1993.05: The Beat Version Z features the Blade Silver Metallic color or Everglade Green Metallic color, three black gauges, mud guards, rear spoiler, exhaust pipe finisher, and alloy wheels.
