= Burgerkill discography =

- Studio albums: 5
- Extended plays: 1
- Video albums: 1
- Music videos: 5

Burgerkill is an Indonesian heavy metal band formed in Bandung in 1995, currently consisting of Vicky (vocals), Agung (guitars), Ramdan (bass), and Putra Pra Ramadhan (drums).

== Albums ==
=== Studio albums ===
Title	Album details
Dua Sisi	Released: August 2000; Label: Riotic Records; Formats: CD, cassette; Producer: Burgerkill and Yayat Ahdiat
Berkarat	Released: December 2003; Label: Sony Music Entertainment; Formats: CD, cassette; Producer: Burgerkill and Yayat Ahdiat
Beyond Coma and Despair	Released: 2006; Label: Revolt Records and Xenophobic; Format: CD; Producer: Burgerkill and Yayat Ahdiat
Venomous	Released: 14 June 2011; Label: Revolt Records and Xenophobic; Format: CD; Producer: Burgerkill and Yayat Ahdiat
Adamantine	Released: 20 April 2018; Label: BKHC Records; Format: CD

=== Split album ===
Title	Album details
3 Way Split with Infireal (Malaysia), Watch It Fall (French)	Released: 1999; Label: Anak Liar Records Malaysia

== Repacked album/EPs ==
Title	Album details
Dua Sisi Repacked	Released: 2004; Label: Sony Music Entertainment; Formats: CD, cassette; Producer: Burgerkill and Yayat Ahdiat
Killchestra (EP)	Released: 2020; Label: BKHC Record; Formats: CD, vinyl, digital

== DVDs ==
Year	DVD details
2012	We Will Bleed: Production: Chronic Rock Studio; Co-Production: Revolt Music Ent.; Type: Documentary film; Format: Limited Deluxe Edition DVD

== Music videos ==
Year	Song	Director(s)	Album
2003	"Terlilit Asa"	Xonad	Berkarat
2003	"Tiga Titik Hitam" (featuring Fadly of Padi)	Xonad, Cerahati	Berkarat
2006	"Shadow of Sorrow"	Endy Echo	Beyond Coma and Despair
2006	"Angkuh"	278 Labs	Beyond Coma and Despair
2011	"Only the Strong"	Gogeng & True Megabenz	Venomous

== Compilations appearance ==
Beside studio album release, Burgerkill also has numerous other works that appeared in several media package, such as singles for various artist compilation album, or original soundtrack movie.

Year	Song	Label	Album
1997	"Revolt!"	40.1.24 Records	Masaindahbangetsekalipisan
1997	"Offered Sucks"	Manifest Records	Breathless Hardcore
1997	"My Self"	Manifest Records	Breathless Hardcore
1998	"Blank Proudness"	Aquarius Indonesia, Pony Canyon Malaysia	Independent Rebel
2001	"Everlasting Hope...Never Ending Pain"	Spill Records	Ticket to Ride
2003	"Berkarat"	Sony Music Entertainment	Berkarat MC&CD album
2006	"Shadow of Sorrow"	Revolt!	Hantu Jeruk Purut Original Soundtrack Movie
2006	"Angkuh"	Revolt!	Hantu Jeruk Purut Original Soundtrack Movie
2007	"Laknat"	Revolt!	Malam Jumat Kliwon Original Soundtrack Movie
2007	"Darah Hitam Kebencian"	Revolt!	Malam Jumat Kliwon Original Soundtrack Movie
