= Aries Tanto =

Indonesian guitarist

Ebenz
- Also known as: Eben, Ebenz, True Megabenz
- Born: Aries Tanto; March 26, 1977; Jakarta
- Died: 3 September 2021 (aged 44) Bandung
- Genres: Metalcore, Hardcore punk, Groove metal, Grindcore
- Occupation: Guitarist
- Years active: 1995–2021
- Past members: Morning Crew; Circus Carnage; Burgerkill; Mesin Tempur
- Spouse: Anggi Pratiwi (m. 2006)
- Children: 3
- Relatives: Sacha Stevenson (sister-in-law)

Aries Tanto (better known by the nickname Ebenz) was an Indonesian guitarist known as one of the founders of the band Burgerkill. The band was formed by him along with his high school friends in 1995. They released their first album, Dua Sisi, in 2000. Internationally, the band received the Metal As F*ck award from the Metal Hammer Golden Gods Awards in 2013.

== Personal life ==
Aries Tanto grew up in Jakarta and earned the nickname Ebenz because he often acted as the payer during gatherings with his friends near his grandmother's residence in the Manggarai area, thus he was called Bento, inspired by the song Iwan Fals titled "Bento" (Swami I). When he transferred from SMAN 82 Jakarta to SMAN 1 Ujungberung (now SMAN 24 Bandung), his friends at school started calling him "Ebenz".

Ebenz learned to play guitar at the age of twelve and was interested in guitar techniques from bands such as Slayer, Anthrax, and Megadeth. In addition, during high school, Ebenz also had a large collection of Punk and Rock music.

Ebenz married Anggi Pratiwi on 25 June 2006 and had three children.

== Career ==
=== Burgerkill ===
Ebenz and Kimung (Sonic Torment) formed the band Morning Crew. The band performed songs from bands such as Black Flag, Exploited, and other punk-hardcore bands. After a brief time with Morning Crew, Ebenz and Kimung invited Ivan Scumbag (Infamy) and Kudung (Forgotten) to form Burgerkill on 11 May 1995, with the lineup of Ebenz (guitar), Kimung (bass), Ivan (vocals), and Kudung (drums), initially as a 'project' band covering songs from bands like Sick Of It All, Wide Awake, and Gorilla Biscuits before creating their own songs.

=== Music projects ===
Shortly after Burgerkill released Beyond Coma and Despair in 2006, Eben and Irvine Jastra hosted the "Radio Distorsi" program on a radio station to promote underground music and provide information about the development of independent bands in Bandung, but the show ended in 2009. Afterwards, together with Gebeg (Taring), Eben formed "Extreme Moshpit" with its debut broadcast on Radio Oz Bandung in January 2010, with an improved concept, including organizing music shows and awards for independent bands.

== Death ==
Ebenz died on September 3, 2021, at 16:15 at the age of 46. The cause of death was a heart attack. It was reported that he had previously fainted and was then rushed to the hospital. His body was laid to rest in his yard in Bandung, West Java.

== Instruments ==
- Guitar – Gibson SG series
  - SG Standard Black – "Si Jagur"
  - SG Standard White – "Si Wiro"
  - SG Gothic Black Custom – "Si Bedil"
  - SG Supreme – "Si Tegep"
  - SG Premium Translucent
- Hardware
  - Peavey 5150 Amplifier
  - Boss Digital Delay DD-3
  - Boss Chromatic Tuner TU-2
  - Boss Volume Pedal
  - Maxon OD808 OverDrive

== Discography ==
=== Burgerkill ===
==== Studio albums ====
- 2000 – Dua Sisi
- 2003 – Berkarat
- 2006 – Beyond Coma and Despair
- 2011 – Venomous
- 2018 – Adamantine

==== Compilations, EPs, and singles ====
- 1997 – "Revolt!"
- 1997 – "Offered Sucks"
- 1997 – "Myself"
- 1997 – "Blank Proudness"
- 1999 – Threeway Split Release EP
- 2000 – "Everlasting Hopes Never Ending Pain"
- 2020 – Killchestra EP

=== Collaborations ===
- 2016 – "Perang" – Aftercoma (Against the Sun)

== Nominations and awards ==
Year	Award	Category	Nominee(s)	Result	Ref.
2023	Hammersonic Awards	Lifetime Achievement	True Megabenz	Shortlisted	

== Bibliography ==
- Kimung (2007). My self, Scumbag: beyond life and death. Minor Books. ISBN 978-9-7925-5892-0. OL 22653785M.
