= Husein Mutahar =

Indonesian diplomat and music composer

Major Husein Mutahar
- حسين مطهر
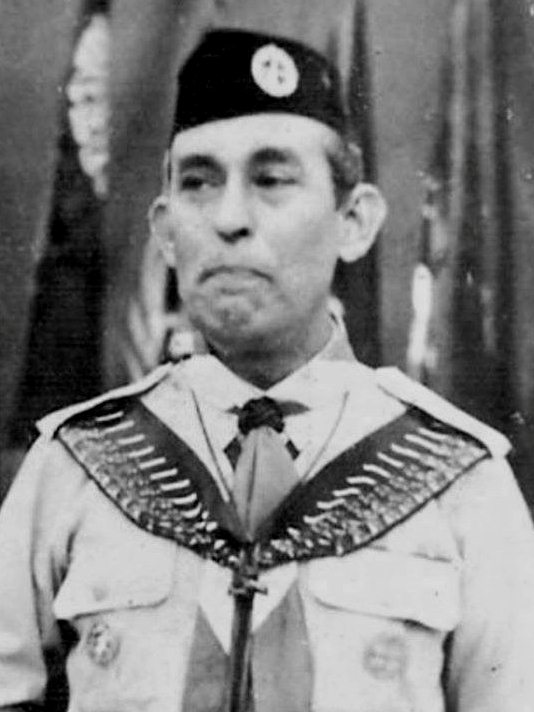
- Mutahar on his scout outfit in 1998

6th Indonesia Ambassador to Vatican
- In office 1969–1973
- Preceded by: Mohammad Nazir
- Succeeded by: Subagio Surjaningrat

Personal details
- Born: Muhammad Husein; 5 August 1916 Semarang, Dutch East Indies
- Died: 9 June 2004 (aged 87) Kebayoran Baru, South Jakarta, Jakarta, Indonesia
- Resting place: Jeruk Purut Cemetery
- Parent: Salim Mutahar (father)
- Education: Europeesche Lagere School; Meer Uitgebreid Lager Onderwijs; Algemene Middelbare School; Gadjah Mada University
- Occupation: Indonesian Army; composer; diplomat
- Known for: Founder of Paskibraka
- Awards: Bintang Gerilya; Bintang Mahaputra Pratama
- Other name: H. Mutahar
- Ethnicity: Arab Indonesian

Military service
- Allegiance: Indonesia
- Branch/service: Indonesian Navy
- Rank: Major
- Battles/wars: Battle of Five Days; Indonesian National Revolution

Major Muhammad Husein Mutahar (Arabic: محمّد حسين مطهر, romanized: Muḥammad Ḥusayn Muṭahar; full name: (Arabic: سيد محمّد حسين بن سليم بن أحمد بن سليم المطهر, romanized: Sayyid Muḥammad Ḥusayn bin Salīm bin ʾaḥmad bin Salīm al-Muṭahar); 5 August 1916 – 9 June 2004) was the founder of Paskibraka, a youth organization in Indonesia which has the main task for raising and lowering the heirloom national flag of Indonesia (now duplicate) in ceremonies commemorating the independence day of Indonesia (17 August). Mutahar was also an Indonesian music composer, especially for national songs and children's songs. As a composer, he was better known as H. Mutahar as his abbreviation name. In addition, as a diplomat Mutahar was once served as Indonesian ambassador to the Vatican in 1969 to 1973.

== Biography ==
=== Early life ===
Husein Mutahar was born in Semarang, Central Java on 5 August 1916. Mutahar came from al-Muṭahar clan of the family of Ba 'Alawi sada, his father was named Sayyid Salim bin Ahmad bin Salim al-Mutahar.

=== Education ===
Mutahar went to elementary school at Europeesche Lagere School for seven years. While studying at the ELS, in addition to studying general knowledge at school, he also concurrently studied the Quran with a female teacher named Encik Nur. After graduating, he then went to middle school in Meer Uitgebreid Lager Onderwijs while concurrently studying religious knowledge with Kyai Saleh in Semarang. After three years, he went to high school at Algemene Middelbare School and majored in Eastern Literature, especially Malay language, in Yogyakarta.

Mutahar had studied at the Faculty of Law of Gadjah Mada University, from 1946 to 1947, after two years he then chose to drop out for participating in the Indonesian National Revolution. In addition, he also attended the Training School Diplomatic and Consular Affairs in the Netherlands and also attended the Training School Diplomatic and Consular Affairs at the United Nations office in New York.

=== Personal life ===
Mutahar was not married during his life, but has 8 adopted children (6 boys and 2 girls). Some were "submitted" from their mother (who were widow) or from their father some time before he was dying. There was also a father or mother who voluntarily gave up his children to be recognized as Mutahar's children.

== Career ==
=== Military career ===
As a soldier, Mutahar fought in the Battle of Semarang. Mutahar moved to Yogyakarta with Sukarno when there was the transfer of capital of the Republic of Indonesia from Jakarta to Yogyakarta in 1946, he was invited by Rear admiral Mohammad Nazir who was served as Chief of Staff of the Navy. Mutahar was later appointed a secretary of commander with the rank of a Lieutenant.

While accompanying Nazir, Sukarno remembered Mutahar as a driver driving his car in Semarang, a few days after the Five Day Battle. Mutahar was then asked by Sukarno from Nazir to serve as his adjutant and was promoted to major. Mutahar then became Adjutant III, then Adjutant II of the president of the Republic of Indonesia from 1946 to 1948.

=== Political career ===
Mutahar had been a member of a political party from 1938 to 1942. During that time he became a clerk in the Consultative Bureau of the Ministry of Industry for North Central Java, Department of Economic Affairs. After Indonesia was occupied by Japan, in 1943 he then became secretary to the head of economic division at the Central Java Governor's office.

After Indonesian independence during Sukarno's leadership in 1966, Mutahar was assigned as Director General of Youth Affairs and Scout at the Ministry of Education and Culture of Indonesia until 1968 when Suharto's leadership. Furthermore, from 1969 to 1979, he became an employee of the Department of Foreign Affairs of the Republic of Indonesia. In addition, as a diplomat he was later appointed as Indonesian Ambassador to the Vatican in 1969–1973. But his last position in politics was as Secretary General of the Department of Foreign Affairs in 1974.

=== Music composer career ===
As a music composer, Mutahar was better known as H. Mutahar as his abbreviation name and has created nearly a hundred songs. His first work was Syukur, the song was written in Semarang on September 7, 1944 and was first introduced to the public in January 1945, a few months before the Proclamation of Indonesian Independence on August 17, 1945. Through the song of Syukur, Mutahar wanted to reveal a great praise and affirm to the listener that the homeland of Indonesia which will soon be free is a gift of God.

His second song was created in 1946 under the title Hari Merdeka. The song was created in the toilet of Hotel Garuda Yogyakarta, at that time he was roommate with Hoegeng Iman Santoso who are both in charge of escorting Sukarno. Hoegeng confused to find paper and pens because Mutahar rushed to pour his ideas onto the paper. Hari Merdeka is often played on the anniversary of the Proclamation. In addition, the song of Syukur and Hari Merdeka was ever reworked by Addie MS with a philharmonic orchestra in Australia.

His last works include Dirgahayu Indonesiaku (created in 1995 and became the official song on the 50th anniversary of Indonesian Independence), Hymne Almamater (Hymne Universitas Indonesia), and several other hymns born of his concern over the destruction of Indonesia's nature. One of the hymns of his creation, Hymne Pramuka (created in 1964) is today the official song for the Gerakan Pramuka Indonesia. For the children's song category, Mutahar was also a composer of several children's songs, including Gembira, Tepuk Tangan Silang-silang, Mari Tepuk, Slamatlah, Jangan Putus Asa, and Saat Berpisah.

== Activities for the nation and people ==
Major Mutahar was part of the 6-man color party that on 17 August 1946, just as the Indonesian National Revolution was raging, took on the first national flag raising ceremony in Yogyakarta in commemoration of the 1st anniversary of national independence, presided by President Sukarno at the Gedung Agung Palace. Together with 5 other youths with him as the escorts, he raised the Bendera Pusaka (the Flag of Indonesia) just as Indonesia Raya was played by a military band to a joyful populace. It would be repeated again in 1947 and 1949.

With the transfer of the capital to Jakarta, Mutahar did not see any flag raising ceremonies until 1966 at the Merdeka Palace but the flag raising method still remained. In 1967, he advised then President Suharto on the formation of the Pasukan Pengibar Bendera Pusaka or National Heirloom Flag Hoisting Troop, with a mission to escort, hoist and lower the flag during Independence Day and other national holiday celebrations in the national and regional levels. In time for the 22nd Independence Day, his suggestion was accepted. The Pasikbraka of today traces its origin to the 70-man color party that was formed for the 1967 Independence Day national flag ceremonies, he was the first mentor of the unit and helped chose and train its first generation personnel.

== Awards ==
On February 15, 1961, Mutahar was awarded Bintang Mahaputra Pratama by the government of the Republic of Indonesia without a presidential decree. In addition, he also received the Bintang Gerilya award unknown dates and years of the conferment.
