= Jeruk Purut Cemetery =

Cemetery in Jakarta, Indonesia

Jeruk Purut
- Interactive map of Jeruk Purut

Details
- Location: Jakarta
- Country: Indonesia Java
- Coordinates: 6°16′48″S 106°48′52″E
- Size: 9.12 hectares (0.09 km^{2}; 0.04 sq mi)

Jeruk Purut is a cemetery in Jakarta, Indonesia.

== Layout ==
Jeruk Purut covers a total area of 9.12 hectares (0.09 km^{2}; 0.04 sq mi). It is located in South Jakarta.

Along with Kalibata Heroes' Cemetery and Karet Bivak and Menteng Pulo public cemeteries, Jeruk Purut is one of the better maintained cemeteries in Jakarta.

== History ==
The cemetery was expanded with wakaf land (land donated for religious purposes) in the mid-2000s, which resulted in the eviction of several squatters. In 2007, burials averaged 300 per month. As of 2007, Jeruk Purut is one of few cemeteries in Jakarta capable of expansion.

== Legends ==
According to local belief, Jeruk Purut is haunted by the ghost of a decapitated pastor. The ghost is said to carry his head around with it, and be followed by a large black dog. He is reportedly looking for his grave, which is said to not be in Jeruk Purut but Tanah Kusir Cemetery.

According to The Jakarta Post, the belief has been around for decades. The Jakarta Globe notes that many visit the cemetery at night to look for it; it is said to only appear on Friday nights when those looking for it are in groups with an odd number of people. The story was used as the inspiration for the 2006 film Hantu Jeruk Purut (The Ghost of Jeruk Purut), which led to a burst in popularity for the cemetery.

More ghosts are reported to abide in the cemetery. They include a child and large hairy ghoul. In 2011, Prambors FM chose Jeruk Purut Cemetery as the scariest place in Jakarta, based on the legend of the headless pastor. It was selected over Lubang Buaya, the site where the corpses of several generals were dumped after an unsuccessful coup, as well as a bridge in Casablanca, a train crossing in Bintaro, and a house in Pondok Indah.

== Notable interments ==
- Adjie Massaid, actor and model cum politician
- Chrisye, singer and songwriter
- Delma Juzar, Indonesian actor and soldier turned lawyer
- Husein Mutahar, Indonesian diplomat and music composer, founder of Paskibraka
- Joesoef Isak, publisher and politician
- Mochtar Lubis, writer and journalist
- Omar Dhani, former chief of Indonesia's air force
- Rizal Ramli, Indonesian politician, economist, and student activist.
