= Burgerkill =

Indonesian metal band

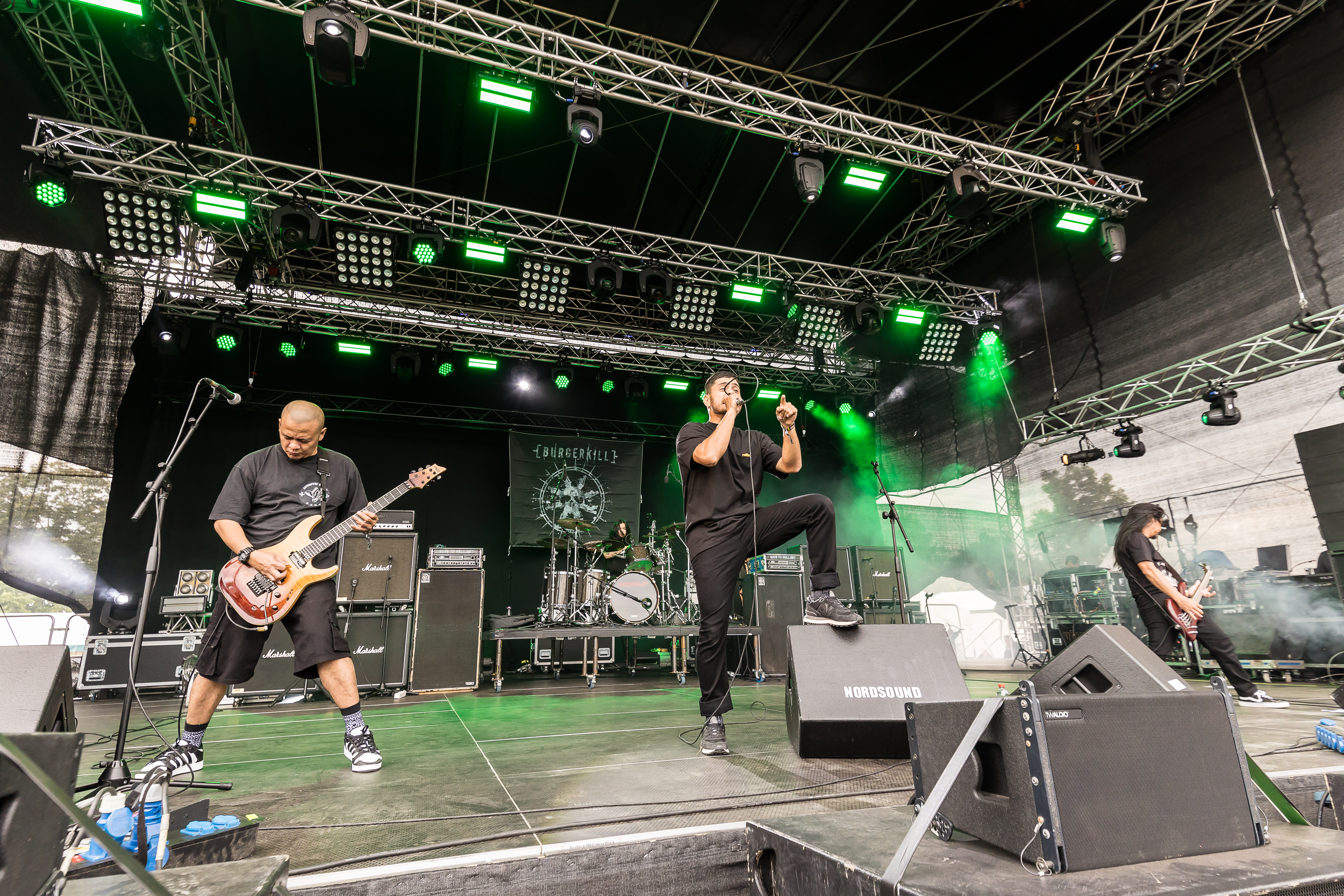
- Burgerkill at the Metal Frenzy Open Air 2024 in Germany

Background information
- Origin: Bandung, West Java, Indonesia
- Genres: Metalcore; hardcore punk; thrash metal; death metal; groove metal
- Years active: 1995–present
- Labels: Revolt; Sony BMG; Riotic; BKHC
- Members: Agung Hellfrog; Ramdan; Putra Pra Ramadhan; Vicky Mono
- Past members: Ivan "Scumbag" Firmansyah; Kimung; Dadan; Ugum; Toto; Andris; Ebenz Bkhc; Ronald Alexander Radja Haba
- Website: burgerkillonline.com

Burgerkill is an Indonesian heavy metal band, originally from Bandung, the capital city of West Java. The band is named after the fast food restaurant Burger King as a prank. The band was founded in May 1995 by Aries Tanto a.k.a. Eben, sometimes called 'Ebenz', a young man from Jakarta, who came to Bandung to continue his study. In Bandung, Ebenz met Ivan Scumbag, Kimung and Dadan. This four personnel became the first line-up of Burgerkill. In 2013, the band won Metal Hammer Golden Gods Awards for Metal as F*ck category.

== History ==
=== 1995–2000: Early years and debut album ===
Burgerkill was formed in Ujungberung region, located in the east side of Bandung city. Ujungberung is not only known as Metal Village, but also known as center of Sundanese traditional art and culture, such as bela diri benjang, angklung and kecapi suling.

In early 1997, Burgerkill released their first single, "Revolt!", which became the opening track of Masaindahbangetsekalipisan various artist compilation album. In late 1997, single "Offered Sucks" and "My Self" were included in Breathless various artist compilation album. Then in 1998, the single "Blank Proudness" was included in the Independent Rebel various artist compilation album. Since then, Burgerkill has been involved in many underground scenes in Indonesia and Malaysia. In the year of 2000, Burgerkill finally released their first album Dua Sisi under local indie label, Riotic Record. The first 5000 copies of cassette and CD's release were sold out. In the same year, Burgerkill released single "Everlasting Hope Never Ending Pain" for Ticket to Ride various artist compilation album. This single could be something like a bridge for a new Burgerkill era. Old hardcore bands, such as Youth of Today, Minor Threat, Gorilla Biscuits and 7 Seconds, etc., are so dominant in Burgerkill early works. In the changing process, Burgerkill transformed into modern metal influences. The sounds was more aggressive, faster beat and energetic power chord riff with more attractive and interesting guitar fill-in. Burgerkill's new sounds style revealed in their second album.

=== 2001–2004: Berkarat ===
Burgerkill "Tiga Titik Hitam" or in English means "Three Black Spots".
"Tiga Titik Hitam" (featuring Fadly of Padi). The song is a unique combination between two different genre-where the straight scream vocals and mellow pop-rock style can be solid each other.

Burgerkill became the first Indonesian metal band to sign a six-album contract for Sony Music Entertainment. At the end of 2003, they released their second album, Berkarat. It was chosen as "Best Metal Production" at the 2004 Indonesian Music Awards. With their new label, Burgerkill had some negative response from Indonesia metal scene, but they noticed the reason behind joining major label because of the label gave them the freedom to choose any kind of music they want to play. Not only free to choose the style of music but also the concept, lyrics and also music video style. To Tembang, they stressed that the important thing was the freedom of music expression itself, no matter if a band in indie-line or in a major label line.

Technically the second album is more progressive than the first one. There is almost none of the straight forward nuance of their first album. In the vocals, they remain settled with depressive dark nuance. Ivan Scumbag, the vocalist, being more expressive to articulate the song, which, all tracks of the album are written in Indonesian, Burgerkill's native language. In this second album, Burgerkill collaborated with Fadly of Padi in "Tiga Titik Hitam" song.

In 2004, Burgerkil released Dua Sisi repacked.

=== 2005–2010: Beyond Coma and Despair ===
Burgerkill "Shadow of Sorrow".
"Shadow of Sorrow" is one of the original soundtrack of horror movie Hantu Jeruk Purut. The track also included in their third album, Beyond Coma and Despair

Burgerkill began to work their third album material in early 2005, at the same time, Toto, who have been with Burgerkill as drummer for nine years long decided to depart from the band. They reformed the line-up with Andris, who at the time played bass, on drums; while the bass work was done by a session player.

In November 2005, Burgerkill finished writing the album, but their deal with Sony was breaking down. Both sides couldn't reach an agreement about the album material. Burgerkill decided to leave the label to release their third album under their own label, Revolt! Record, in August 2006. In the days waiting to release their third album, the vocalist Ivan Scumbag died because of inflamed brain disease. Beyond Coma and Despair, the title of their third album, has become some kind like Scumbag's personal reflection. To honor their past vocalist and friend, Kimung, the group's original bassist and Ivan Scumbag's childhood friend, released a biographical novel based on Ivan Scumbag's life in late 2007. The book which titled My Self: Scumbag, Beyond Life and Death was officially released and supported by Minor Book as publisher and "Common Room" as venue holder. About 300 people, consisting of Ivan Scumbag's friends, family and fans along with some journalists, attended the memorial where the book was discussed, people spoke about Ivan Scumbag his life along with a short acoustic set from the band.

Among the critics, Beyond Coma And Despair was utterly different from their past albums with heavier sounds and more explicit lyrics. The album was included in The 150 Greatest Indonesian Albums of All Time, listed at number 113 by Rolling Stone Indonesia magazine. In the aftermath of Ivan Scumbag's death, Vicky joined the band after chosen in audition. In 2009, the band toured in Australia under title "The Invasion of Noise Western Australia" tour. Following the "Invasion of Noise" tour, Burgerkill performed alongside such bands as DevilDriver, In Flames, Lamb of God and All That Remains as part of 2009 Soundwave in Perth, Australia. In 2010, they appeared in Big Day Out.

=== 2011–2017: Venomous ===
Burgerkill "Under The Scars" (2011)
"Under The Scars" single was released exclusively via Free Download canal of Rolling Stone Indonesia online magazine in 11 May 2011. The single was included in their 4th album, Venomous.

Venomous was revealed around late 2009, to Samack of Jakartabeat Eben told that their new album not too far different from their past one, Beyond Coma and Despair. Eben and his fellow band member felt that the new material album has a new progress in each musical line. European bands such as Gojira, Hacride, Meshuggah and Lyzanxia are main influence to them to create a heavier middle beat style. And the old North America-based band such as Megadeth, Slayer, Monstrosity, Cannibal Corpse, Pantera and Anthrax are still become main inspiration in working on song emotion and the structure. In the vocals session, the band mostly refer to Devin Townsend, Mark Hunter, Björn Speed, etc. The band new vocalist, Vicky, according to Eben has a strong vocals distortion. So why Eben revealed his optimism to Samack in working on their new album material.

Just few weeks after "Allegiance 2 Metal" tour across Java Island along with technical death metal band, Psycroptic, Burgerkill released Venomous in Indonesia around June 2011, Malaysia around July 2011 and Australia around August 2011. Venomous is their first album under Xenophobic Record label and Firestarter Music as distributor. Venomous according to Eben has significantly differences from their past album, not only music but also lyrics. Burgerkill's music style always changes from one album to the next one, but the lyrics in past album remained segmented in a certain theme or topic. That's why Eben said the albums before Venomous are just alike Ivan Scumbag legacy. In the past albums, Ivan had dominant writing to the lyrics, then in the postdecease of Ivan, all Burgerkill man agreed to discuss about the lyrics material to their next albums. In this case Eben little disagreed to people who compared Vicky to Ivan Scumbag. Eben said those two man have different background. "If Ivan said his life was miserable, yeah, he was right, he was miserable man..", said Eben. "We don't want to write the lyrics about the thing that we never feel, see, or experience", Eben stressed his words to explain their new lyrics theme, and let the fans have opinion about Beyond Coma and Despair and two album before as Ivan Scumbag's legacy, especially the mostly dark and distrust lyrics.

The Venomous launching concert which titled "Venomous Alive" was held in Jakarta at Bulungan Outdoor with opening act band from the capital city such as Nemesis, Paper Gangster and Dead Vertical. For the bigger one concert, "Venomous Alive" took place in Siliwangi Stadium, Bandung and attended more than 10.000 of their die-hard fans, along with Man Jasad, and Arian of Seringai as opening act and guest performer. Beside these two Indonesia major cities, "Venomous Alive" also rock on other major and minor city across Java Island and other city outside the island, such as Makassar, South Sulawesi.

Venomous regionally was well received. British magazine Metal Hammer and also Heavy Magazine described Venomous as slightly technical death metal with many riffs. The magazine also wrote if someone took equal parts from Morbid Angel, Obituary, Sepultura and Killswitch Engage, and he or she should have Burgerkill. In the magazine opinion many other bands like that, but the magazine also praised Burgerkill's unique in the face military style has them attacking each song with such ferocity and intensity that he or she will take notice. In June 2013, Burgerkill won the Metal Hammer Golden Gods Awards for "Metal As F*ck" category.

=== 2018–present: Adamantine ===
On 20 April 2018, the band released their fifth album Adamantine. The album was planned to be released in 2015 marking their 20th anniversary but was postponed due to the tight schedule and personnel changes. Adamantine consists of nine tracks, including a cover version of Iwan Fals' song "Air Mata Api". Adam Rees of Louder gave the album 4 stars out of 5, writing "Adamantine is a genuine world-beater, light years ahead of its predecessor in terms of production, songwriting craft and sonic impact." Metal Hammer included the album in their list of 50 Best Metal Albums of 2018.

To introduce their latest album, Burgerkill toured seven cities in Europe and six cities in America. The tour runs from October to November 2018.

== Band members ==
Current members

- Ramdan — bass guitar (2007–present)
- Agung Hellfrog — lead guitar, rhythm guitar (2003–present)
- Putra Pra Ramadhan — drums (2016–present)
- Vicky Mono — vocals (2007–2021, 2026–present)

Former members

- Ivan Scumbag — vocals (1995–2006; died 2006)
- Kimung — bass guitar (1995–2000)
- Dadan — drums (1995–1996)
- Toto — drums (1996–2005)
- Ugum — rhythm guitar (1998–2002)
- Andris — bass guitar (2000–2005), drums (2005–2016)
- Ebenz — lead guitar, rhythm guitar (1995–2021; died 2021)
- Ronald Alexander Radja Haba — vocals (2021–2025)

Timeline

== Discography ==
Studio albums

- Dua Sisi (2000)
- Berkarat (2003)
- Beyond Coma and Despair (2006)
- Venomous (2011)
- Adamantine (2018)
- Killchestra (2020)

== Awards and nominations ==
Year	Nominee / work	Award	Result
2004	Berkarat	Indonesian Music Awards — Best Metal Production	Won
2012	Venomous	Indonesian Music Awards — Best Rock Album	Nominated
2012	"House of Greed"	Indonesia Cutting Edge Awards — Best Metal Song	Nominated
2012	"House of Greed"	Indonesia Cutting Edge Awards — Favourite Metal Song	Won
2013	Burgerkill	Metal Hammer Golden Gods Awards — Metal As F*ck	Won
2015	Burgerkill	Global Metal Apocalypse Awards — Best Live Act	Nominated
2015	Burgerkill	Global Metal Apocalypse Awards — News Event of the Year	Nominated
2016	Burgerkill	Magnitude Hammersonic Metal Award — Hammersonic Awards	Won
2017	Burgerkill	Hammersonic Awards — Best Metal Performance	Nominated
2018	Adamantine by Fajar Allanda and Ebenz	Indonesian Music Awards — Best Album Design Graphics	Nominated
2018	Superficial	Indonesian Music Awards — Best Hardcore/Metal Production Works	Nominated
2022	"Roar of Chaos"	Indonesian Music Awards — Best Metal Solo Male/Female/Group/Collaboration	Nominated
2022	"Elang" (featuring Ahmad Dhani)	Indonesian Music Awards — Best Rock Duo/Group/Collaboration	Nominated

== See also ==
- My Self Scumbag
