= Bendera Pusaka =

First Indonesian flag

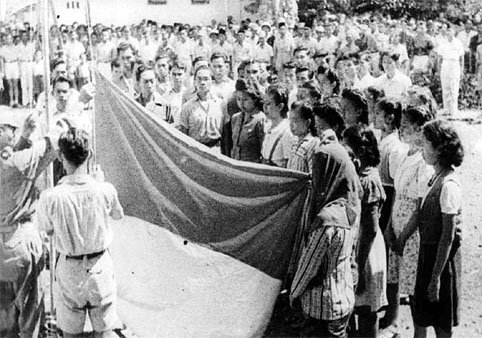
The Bendera Pusaka is raised for the first time

The Bendera Pusaka Sang Saka Merah Putih (lit. 'The Sacred Red and White Heirloom Flag') was the first Indonesian flag. Sewn by Sukarno's wife Fatmawati, it was raised for the first time when Sukarno proclaimed Indonesia's independence on 17 August 1945. Although required by law to be housed in the National Monument, the flag is still kept at the Presidential Palace.

== History ==
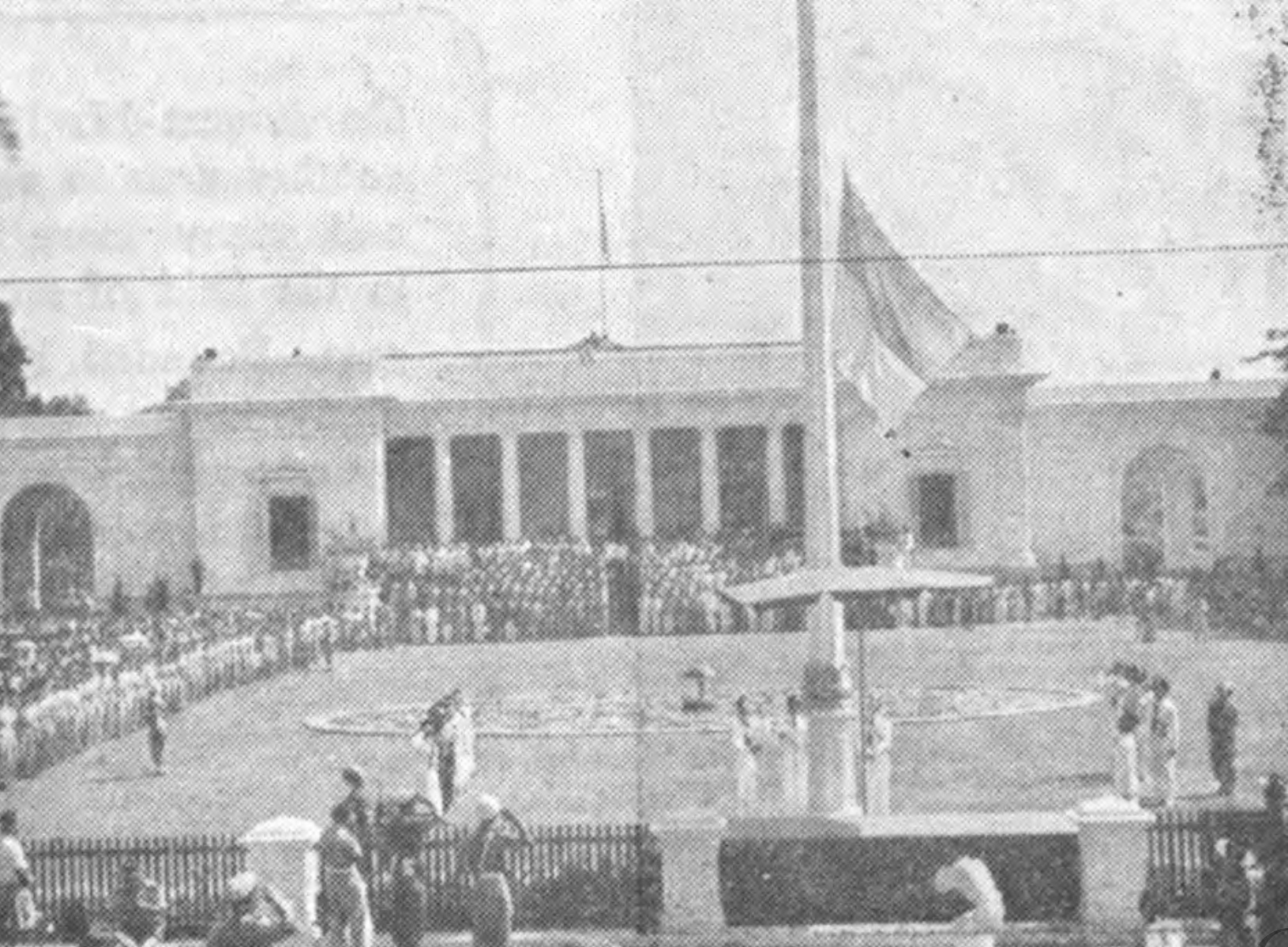
Hoisting of Bendera Pusaka at Merdeka Palace, 1953

The Bendera Pusaka was sewn by Sukarno's wife Fatmawati. It was based on a 13th-century Majapahit flag, which had nine stripes of red and white.

It was first raised at Sukarno's house at 56 Pegangsaan Timur Street, Jakarta, after Sukarno read the Proclamation of Indonesian Independence. It was hoisted on a short bamboo staff by a group led by Captain Latief Hendaningrat; after its hoisting, the gathered crowd sang "Indonesia Raya".

During the first year of the Indonesian National Revolution, the Bendera Pusaka flew day and night. After the Dutch took Jakarta in 1946, the Bendera Pusaka was brought to Yogyakarta in Sukarno's briefcase. During Operatie Kraai, the Bendera Pusaka was cut in half and given to Indonesian composer Husein Mutahar for safekeeping; Mutahar was told to "protect the flag with [his] life". Despite being captured by and escaping from the Dutch, Mutahar managed to bring the flag to Jakarta, sew it back together, and turn it over to Soedjono. Soedjono later returned the flag to Sukarno, who was in exile in Bangka. After the end of the war, the Bendera Pusaka was raised once a year in front of the Presidential Palace during Independence Day celebrations.

In 2003, plans were released to relocate the Bendera Pusaka from the Presidential Palace to the National Monument. In 2004, the relocation was expected to cost Rp. 3.5 billion (US$388,889), with the flag being stored in a 24-karat gold-plated case within the Independence Room of the Monument. However, the relocation has been consistently delayed. As of 2009, its storage at the National Monument has been mandated by law.

== Description and symbolism ==
The Bendera Pusaka consists of two bands, red at the top and white at the bottom, at a scale of 2:3. The red stands for bravery (Indonesian: keberanian), while the white stands for purity (Indonesian: kesucian). However, alternative meanings have been proposed, including that the red represents palm sugar and the white represents rice, both staples of Indonesian cuisine.

== Social impact ==
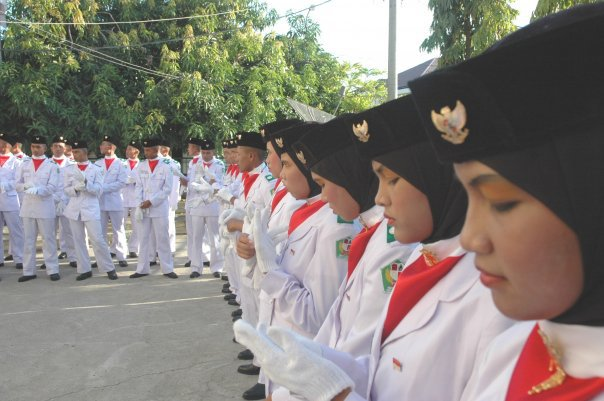
A Paskibraka troop in Aceh, during a flag ceremony

The Bendera Pusaka has been used in the name of the Indonesian student organization Pasukan Pengibar Bendera Pusaka (often abbreviated Paskibraka; English: Pusaka Flag Hoisting Troop). The organization, which was founded by Husein Mutahar in 1968, provides flag bearers for flag ceremonies in the local and national levels as well as in international functions for overseas Indonesians.

== Relocation ==
In 2003, the governor of Jakarta, Sutiyoso announced his plan to relocate the original Bendera Pusaka from the Merdeka Palace to the National Monument. For security and financial reasons, the Rp 3.5 billion (US$388,889) project was delayed for a year. Of the Rp3.5 billion, only Rp 500 million was allocated for the actual relocation ceremony, while most of the remaining Rp 3 billion was spent on procuring around 15 kilograms of gold for the conservation room and on security measures such as alarms and security cameras. The spending was proposed in the 2003 revised city budget. The plan was to install the flag in a 24-carat gold plated case in the Independence Room inside the National Monument. Inside the Independence Room, there are three most important relics from Indonesia's history: the Garuda Pancasila statue, the Nusantara (Archipelago) map and the original text of the Proclamation of Independence, which all are kept in the gold plated cases.

== Bibliography ==
- Torchia, Christopher (2007). Indonesian Idioms and Expressions: Colloquial Indonesian at Work. Singapore: Tuttle. ISBN 978-0-8048-3873-3.
