= Songkok =

Traditional Southeast Asian cap

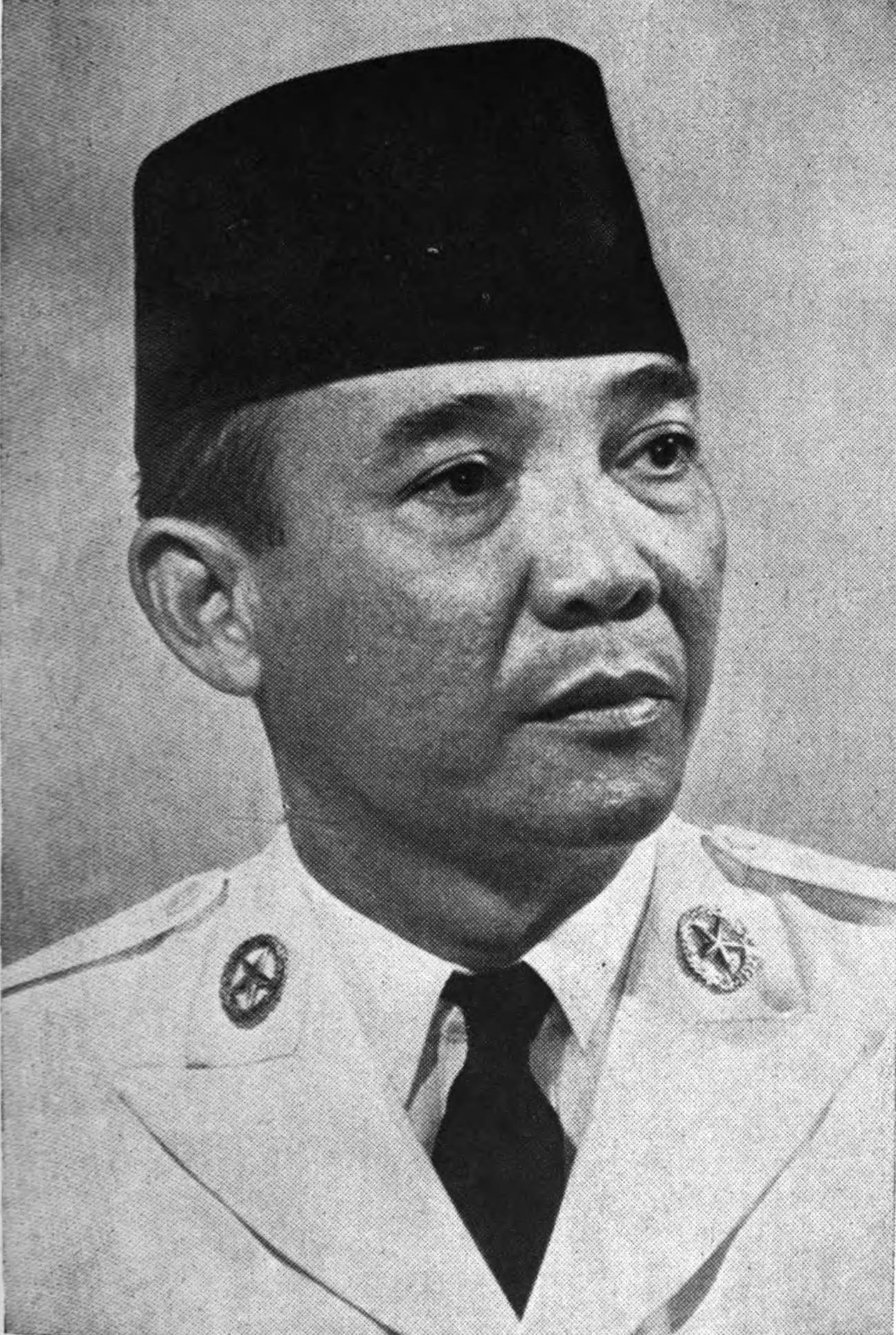
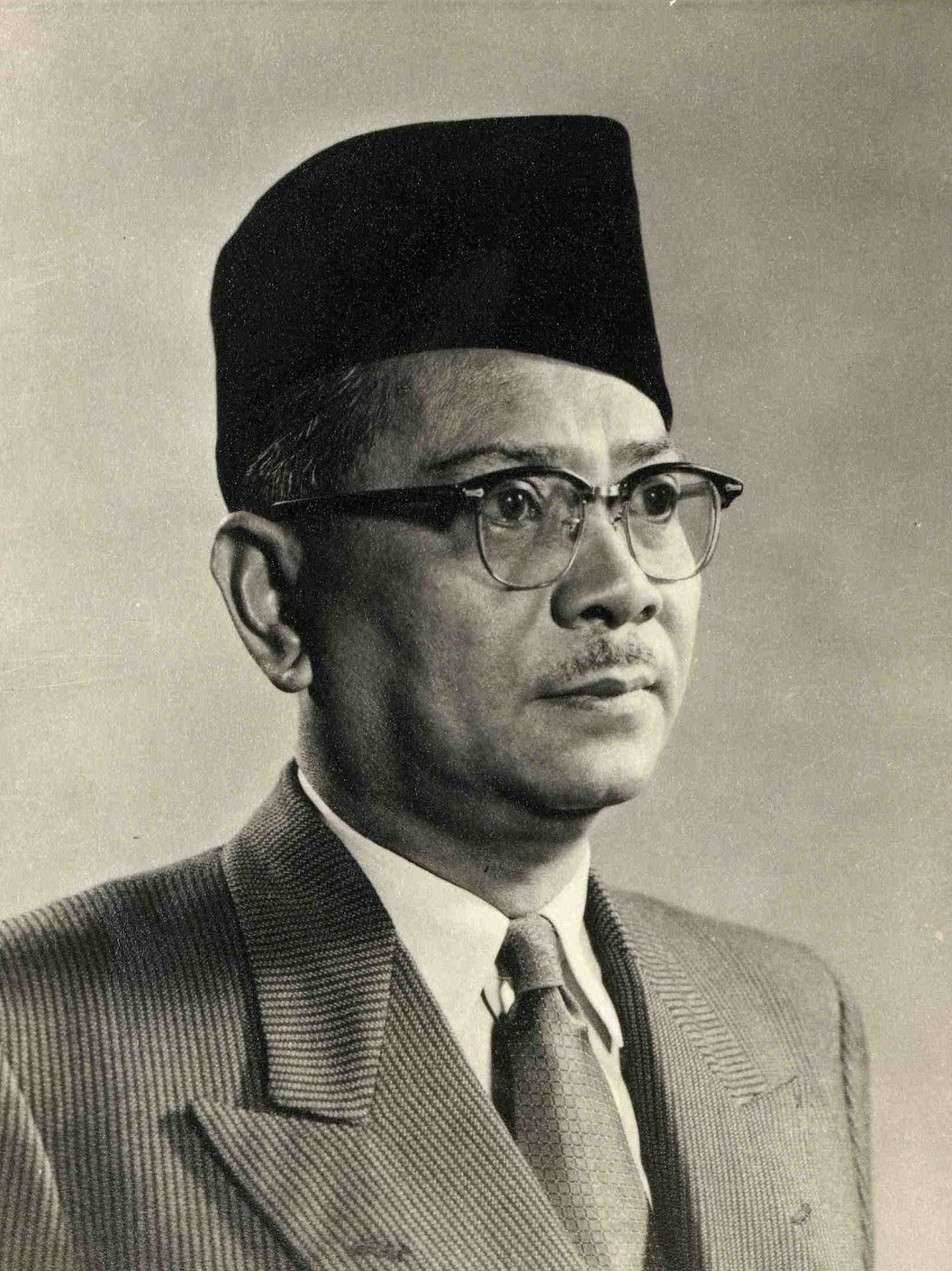
- Indonesian leader Sukarno (left) and Malaysian leader Tunku Abdul Rahman (right) wearing a songkok.
- Type: Traditional cap
- Place of origin: Malaysia

The songkok (Jawi: سوڠکوق), peci (Jawi: ڤيچي), or kopiah (Pegon: کوڤياه) is a Malay close-fitting rimless cap resembling a fez widely worn in Brunei, Indonesia, Malaysia, Singapore, southern Philippines, southern Thailand and the Malay world, most commonly among Muslim males. It has the shape of a truncated cone, usually made of black or embroidered felt, cotton or velvet. It is also worn by males for formal occasions such as weddings and funerals or festive occasions such as the Eid ul-Fitr and Eid al-Adha holidays. In Indonesia, it is also associated with the nationalist movement.

== Names ==
It is called "songkok" in Malaysia, Singapore, Southern Thailand, and Sumatra, while in Brunei and Java, it is called "kopiah" or "kopeah". A version of the songkok with a more elliptical shape is widely known in Indonesia as "peci".

== Origin ==
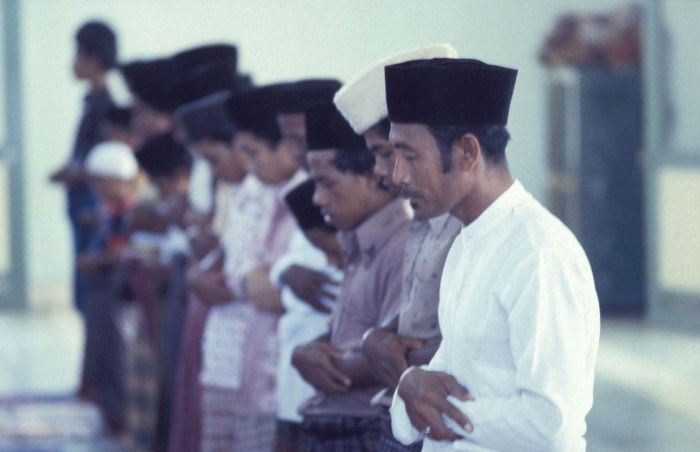
Songkok, kopiah or peci has been traditionally worn by Muslim men in Southeast Asia, as shown here during prayer

The hat is recorded in Pigafetta's Italian-Malay vocabulary of 1521 (published 1524) as "cophia", while "kupiah" appears in Hikayat Iskandar Zulkarnain, an epic which was written before 1600 AD:

Maka tatkala memeliharakan disuruhnya anaknya memakai perhiasan seperti pakaian laki-laki dan dikenakan kepada kepalanya kupiah ros yang keemasan. (So when he took care of his son, he ordered him to wear jewelry like men's clothes and put on his head a golden rosary kupiah.)

The kopiah or kupiah is also described as being worn by Majapahit elite troops (Bhayangkara), recorded in the Hikayat Banjar, written in or not long after 1663.

Other sources state that the origins of the songkok are thought to come from Islamic traditions, introduced to Southeast Asia by Arab or Muslim traders. Songkok is closely related to the fez, a traditional Arab head covering. The fez is a cylindrical hat with a rounded tip and is usually red in color, often with a black crest. Historically, the fez became popular in the Ottoman Empire in the 19th century as a symbol of modernization, replacing the turban which was considered impractical. As Islamic cultural influences spread to Southeast Asia through trade routes, the concept of the fez was introduced and eventually adapted by the Malay community. However, due to differences in local environment and culture, the form of the fez was later modified into the songkok, which has a simpler shape with a flat tip and no crest. Culturally, the songkok has a similar meaning to the fez as a symbol of Islamic identity and is used in religious and formal events. One Brunei newspaper account erroneously states that the songkok became a norm in the Southeast Asia Archipelago in the 13th century with the coming of Islam in the region.

The earliest written mention of the word songkok is in Syair Siti Zubaidah (1840). While the traditional triangular Malay headdress called tengkolok or destar is associated with traditional Malay nobles and royalties, songkok on the other hand has become part of traditional Malay men's costume associated with Islam, traditionally worn by local ulamas.

The Royal Malay Regiment of the Malaysian Army has worn songkok as part of their uniform since British rule.

== Current use ==
=== Indonesia ===
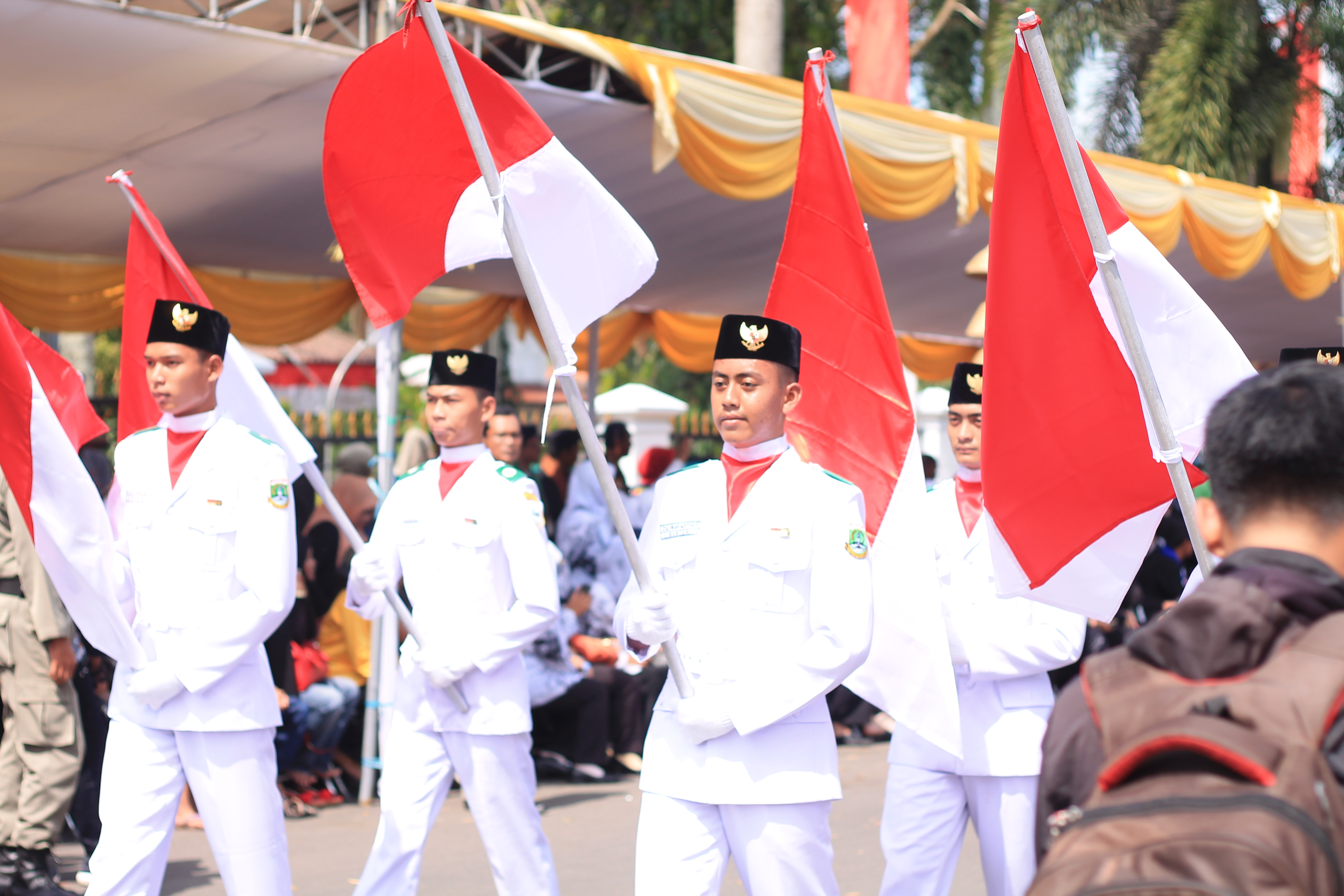
Indonesian flag raising squad (Paskibra) wearing peci as part of their uniform

Traditionally, songkok is usually associated with Muslim men, during religious, formal or state occasions. However, in Indonesia, the songkok has become the national headdress, with secular nationalist connotations made popular by Sukarno. Several members of the Indonesian nationalist movement in the early 20th century wore peci, such as Sukarno, Mohammad Hatta, and Agus Salim. However, as the first president of Indonesia it was Sukarno that popularised peci – more precisely a plain black velvet peci – as the national men's cap of Indonesian, and Indonesian male presidents have worn peci as part of their official presidential attire ever since. Indonesian official palace guards also wore peci as part of their uniform. The Paskibraka (Indonesian: pasukan pengibar bendera pusaka), a youth organization that raises the flag at Indonesian Independence Day celebrations, also wears peci, and there is a female version of the peci with a curved back. The Betawi people wear the songkok as their traditional headdress, usually colored dark red. Catholic and Protestant Betawi of Kampung Sawah regularly wear peci as part of traditional attire during church service. The Christian Torajan people also wears peci for their village traditional events.

=== Malaysia ===
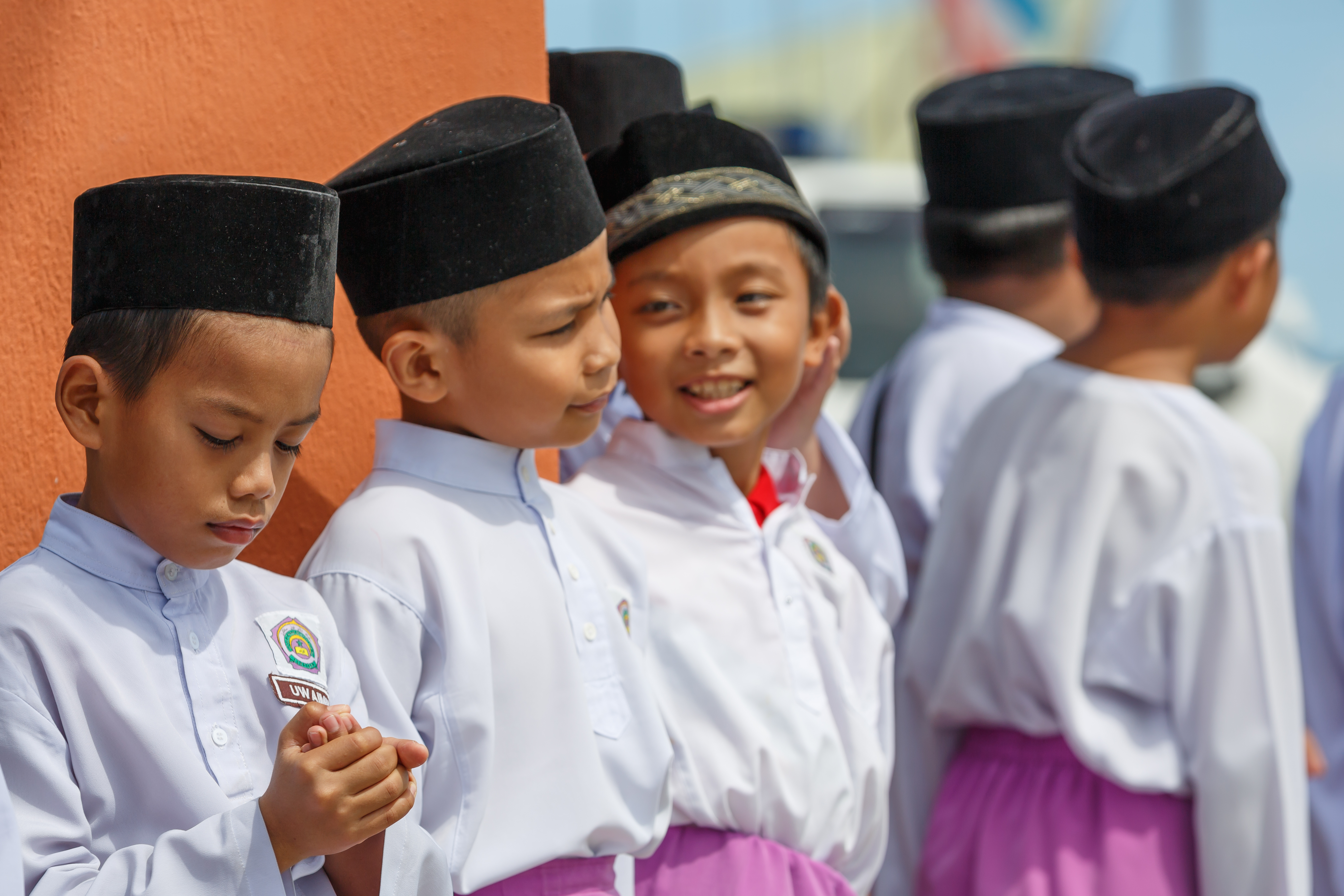
Malay boys wearing songkok as part of their traditional attire in Malaysia

In Malaysia, traditional male Malay attire consists of a songkok, shirt, matching pants, and a waist wrap called the songket. At Dewan Undangan Negeri (State Legislative Assemblies) or in Dewan Rakyat (Parliament), all members (regardless of race or religion) of the legislative assembly are required to wear the songkok (with a gold middle stripe) as a formal custom, at every State Customary Opening of Parliament (or respective State Legislative Assemblies), held once annually, in order to comply with the dress code of each legislative assembly opening. This is done to ensure decorum whenever the respective Head of State (Yang di-Pertuan Agong for the Parliament of Malaysia, respective Sultans or Yang diPertua Negeri for each State Legislative Assembly) is present to open the legislative assembly proceedings for the year. Similarly, all recipients of honorific orders bestowed by either the Yang di-Pertuan Agong (for federal honorific orders) or the Sultan (for each respective state honorific orders), are required to wear the gold-striped songkok along with the official customary attire in Malaysia to receive their honorific orders in person.

The Speaker of the Dewan Rakyat themself wears a songkok in place of the colonial wig, as do judges in their court dress. The latter was pioneered by future Chief Justice of Malaya Hashim Sani Yeop during his then chairing of the Ipoh High Court in 1978; his choice was seen as highly contentious and transgressive among more senior judges at the time who wanted to abide by English court tradition.

=== Singapore ===
In Singapore, the songkok is not allowed to be worn in government schools as part of the school uniform, as Singapore is officially a secular state and all religious headgear is not allowed to be worn. It is part of the standard uniform at madrasahs (Islamic religious schools).

=== Philippines ===
In the Philippines, the songkok, known as kopiah or kupya, plays a role in the heraldry of the Sultanate of Sulu, and is part of the traditional wear of Bangsamoro men. It is part of the traditional formal clothing of Muslim Filipino men in general, along with a local Mindanaoan variation of the Baju Melayu and the native malong (sarung). Some non-Muslim Lumad Filipino datu also wear the kopiah, as a result of being historically influenced by the fashions and customs of Muslim Filipinos. The kopiah is worn by Muslim Filipino men throughout the archipelago as a formal cap for prayers, and for religious and social functions. Kopiah with gold-string embroidery, or cuts of inaul or fabric with okir designs, are gaining popularity alongside the conservative black velvet version. A red and white checkered Saudi-style ghutrah worn draped over a kopiah is a traditional indicator in the Southern Philippines of a hajji, a male pilgrim who has been to Makkah as part of the hajj.

== Gallery ==
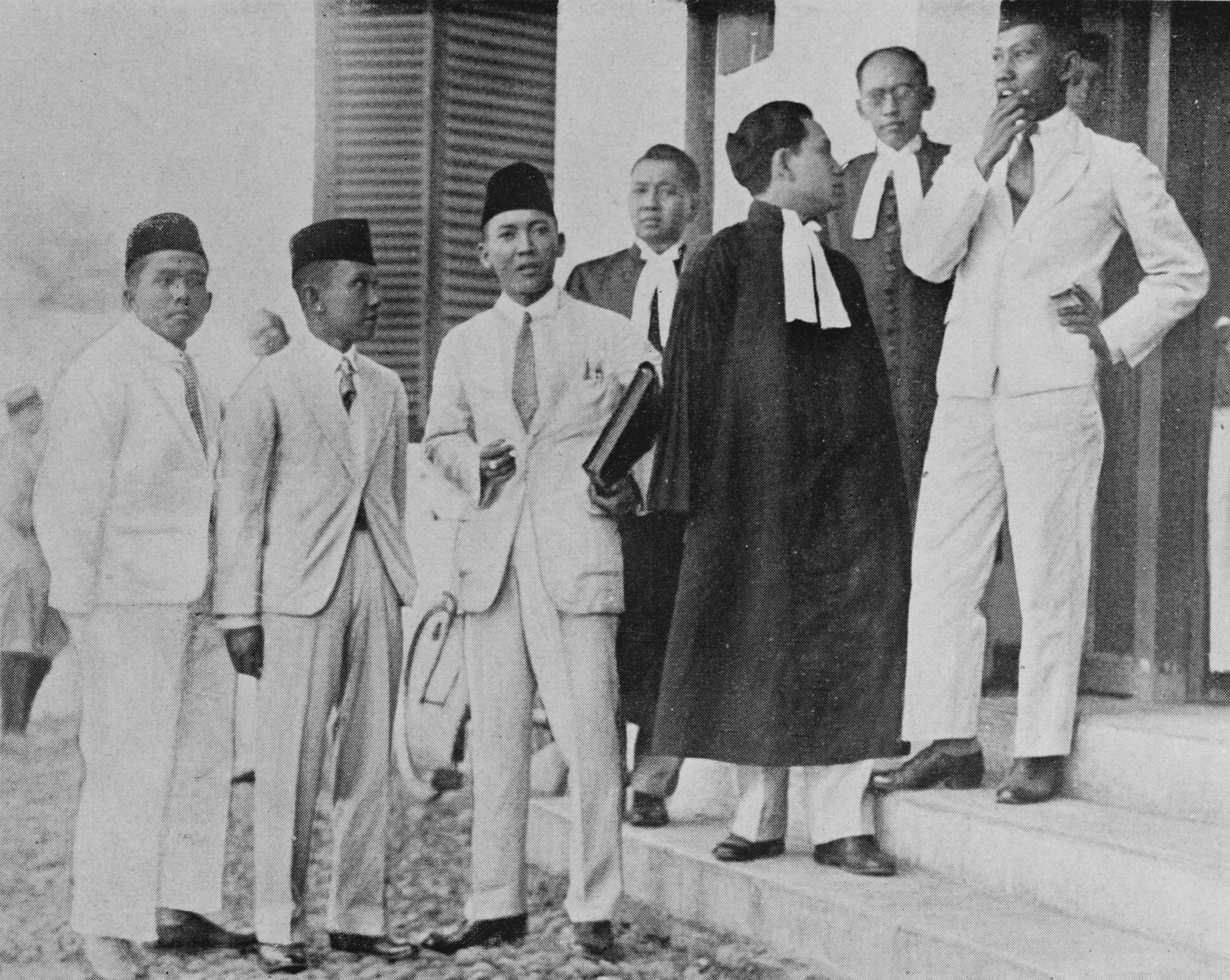
Indonesian independence activists of the early 20th century (1930), including Sukarno, often wore peci, which gave the Indonesian peci its current nationalist associations.

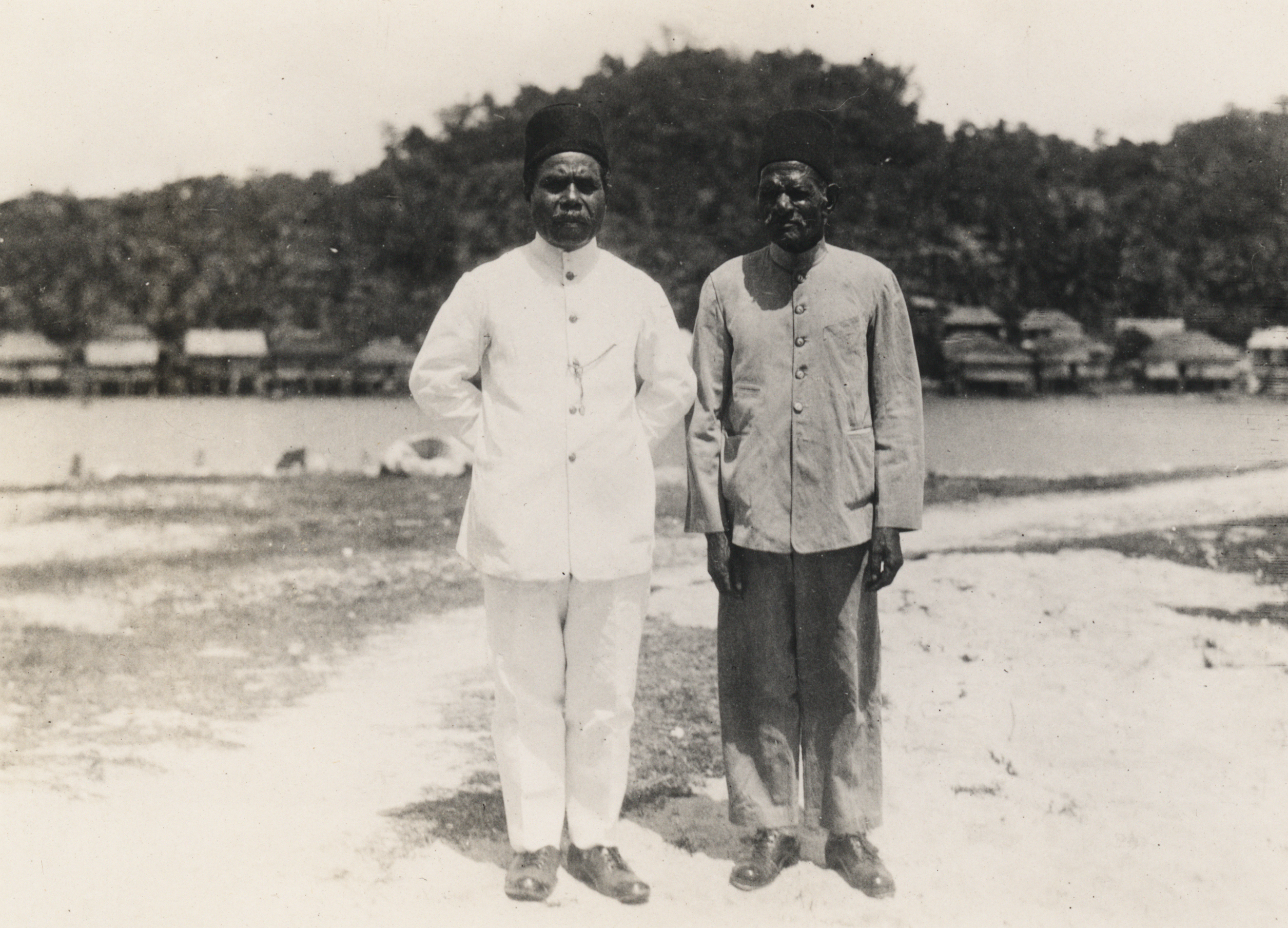
Two Papuan raja wearing kopiah in Kokas, Fakfak (between 1933 and 1936).

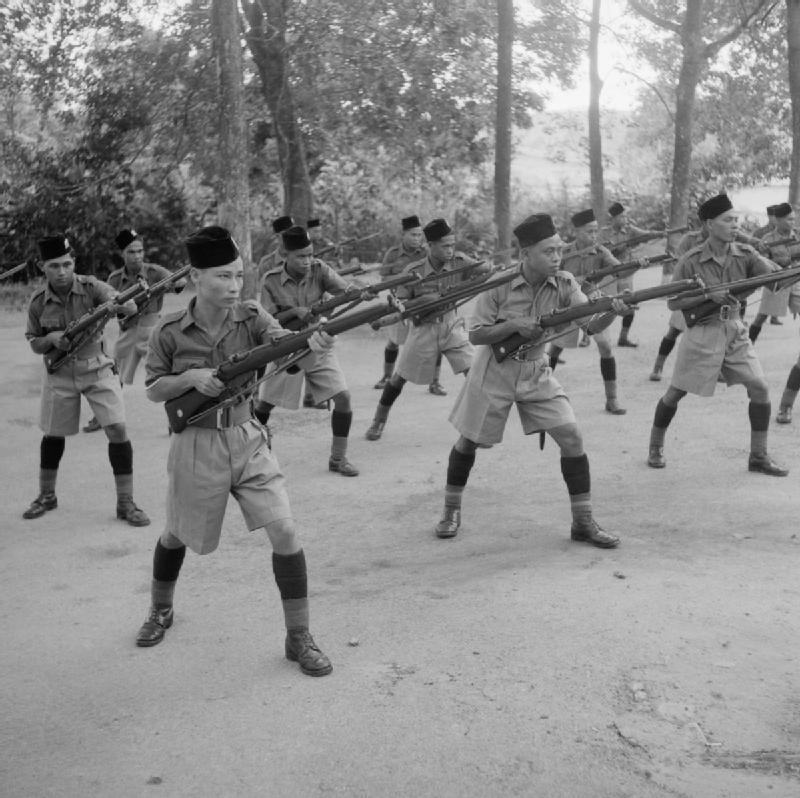
Men of the Rejimen Askar Melayu DiRaja wearing songkok at bayonet practice, Singapore Island (1941).

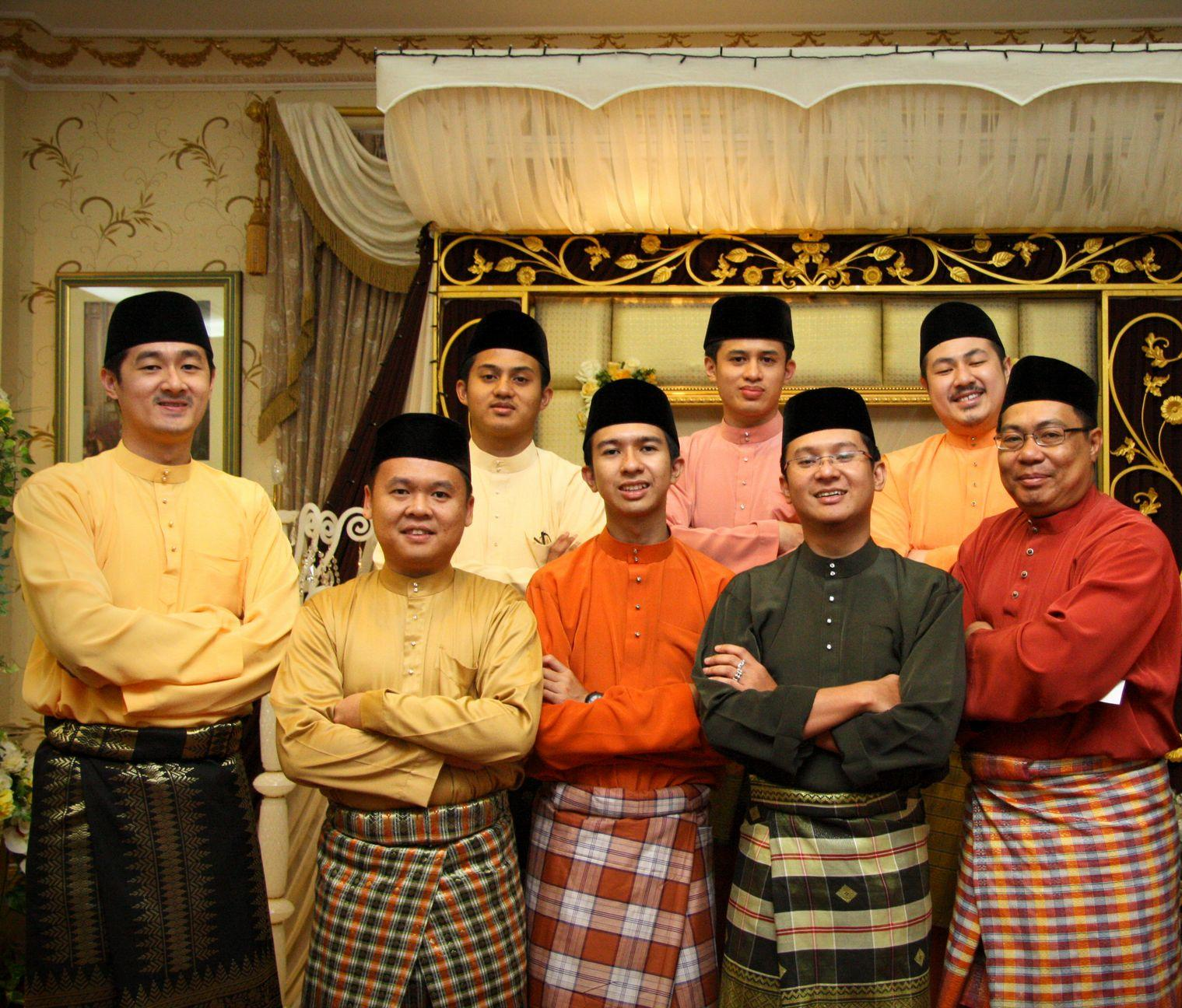
A group of Bruneian men wearing songkok as part of Baju Melayu, traditional Malay attire

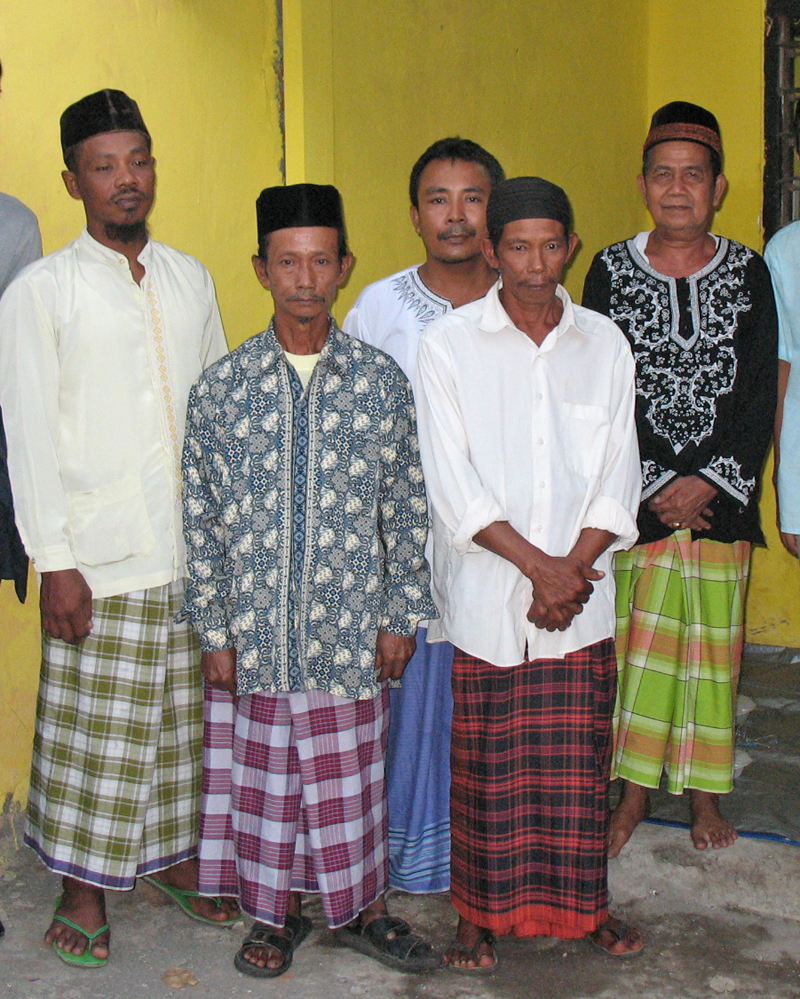
Javanese Muslim men wearing kopiah and sarong

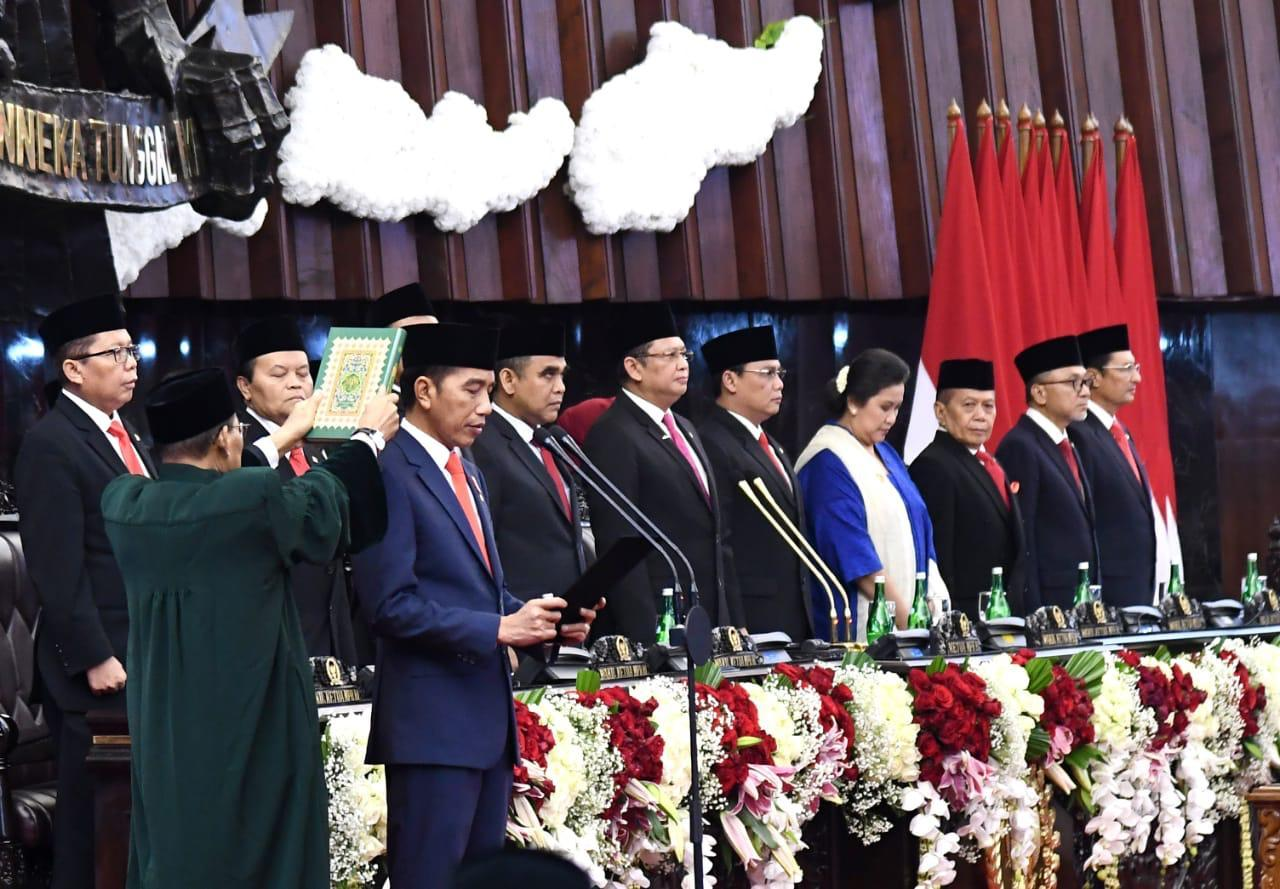
Indonesian president Joko Widodo and leaders of parliament wearing peci as part of national formal attire

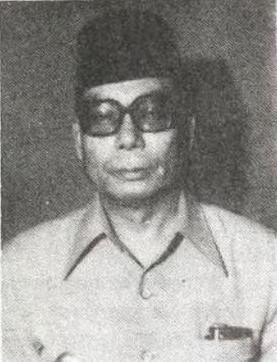
E.W.P. Tambunan, a Christian, was known for his habit of wearing red songkok.

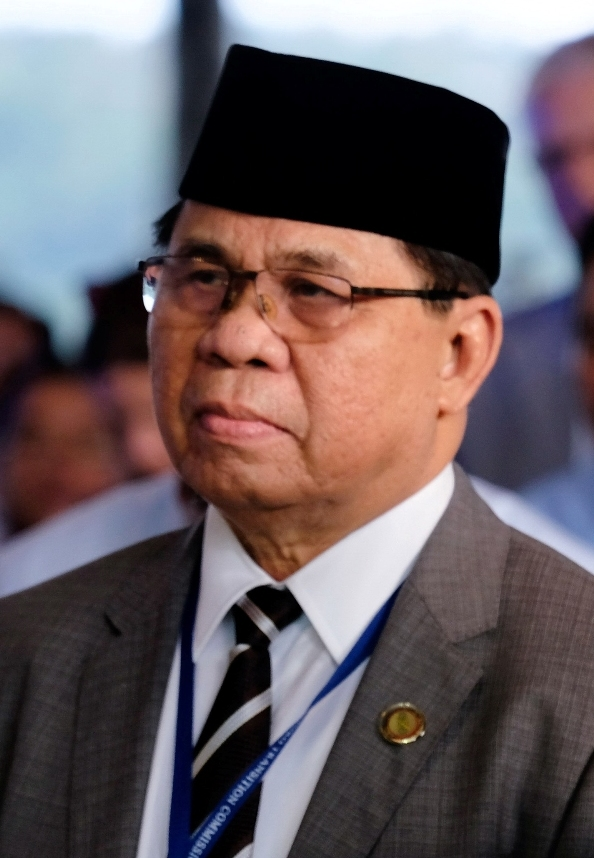
Murad Ebrahim, Chief Minister of the Bangsamoro Region, southern Philippines

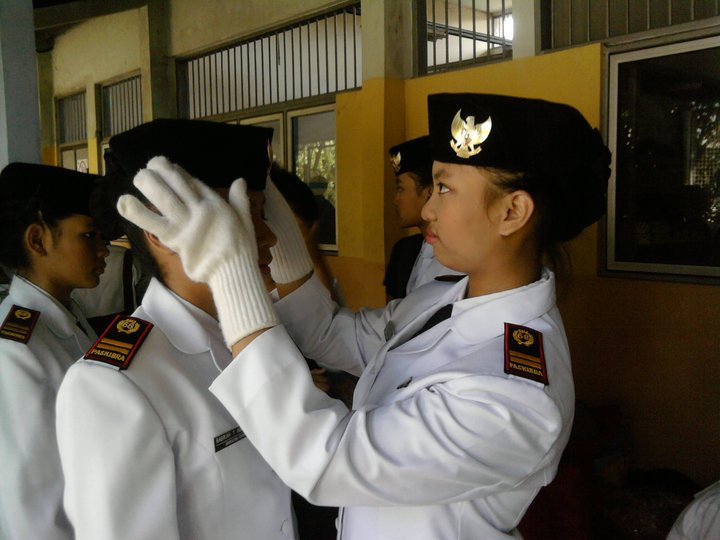
Female version of the peci with curved back, worn by Indonesian Independence Day flag raising squad (Paskibraka)

== See also ==
- Gandhi cap
- List of hat styles
- Tengkolok
- Malaysian cultural outfits
- Culture of Malaysia
- National costume of Indonesia
- Culture of Indonesia
