= My Self Scumbag =

- Author: Kimung
- Original title: My Self: Scumbag, Beyond Life and Death
- Illustrator: Eben of Burgerkill
- Language: Bahasa Indonesia
- Genre: Music
- Publisher: Minor Books
- Publication date: 2007
- Publication place: Indonesia
- Media type: Print
- Pages: 368 pages; 14x21
- ISBN: 979-25-5892-6

My Self: Scumbag, Beyond Life and Death is a biographical novel based on Ivan Scumbag's life. Ivan Scumbag was the lead vocalist of Burgerkill, an Indonesian heavy metal band.

== Overview ==
The book was published in Indonesia in late 2007, written by ex-Burgerkill bassist Kimung. Ryan Koesuma of "Deathrockstar" online magazine noted: "The book is a fragment about Indonesia underground music scene. This published was one of success effort to record a local and modern subculture. Not only about Ivan Scumbag as an ordinary human, the book described about Burgerkill, the band that Ivan Scumbag and Kimung formed. Besides that, the book was a side story of the "Ujungberung Rebels" community.

== See also ==
- Burgerkill
