= Flag of Indonesia =

Republic of Indonesia
- Sang Saka Merah-Putih; Bendera Merah-Putih; Merah-Putih
- Use: National flag and ensign
- Proportion: 2:3
- Adopted: 11 November 1293 (Majapahit Empire); 28 October 1928 (standardized); 17 August 1945; 81 years ago (original); 17 August 1950; 76 years ago (official)
- Design: A horizontal bicolour of red and white
- Designed by: Jayakatwang
- Use: Physical version
- Proportion: 2:3

The national flag of Indonesia is bicolor, with two horizontal bands, red (top) and white (bottom) with an overall ratio of 2:3. It was introduced and hoisted in public during the proclamation of independence on 17 August 1945 at 56 Jalan Proklamasi (formerly Jalan Pegangsaan Timur) in Jakarta, and again when the Dutch formally transferred sovereignty on 27 December 1949. The design of the flag has remained unchanged since. The flag is named Sang Saka Merah Putih, lit. 'The Heirloom Red-White'.

The flag of Indonesia is graphically similar to the flag of Monaco, with a slight difference in the shade of red, and ratio of its dimensions. The flag of Poland has similar dimensions but has the colours reversed: white on top and red on the bottom. In both Monaco's and Poland's flags, the reds are of a slightly darker shade than that of Indonesia. The flag of Singapore has exactly the same dimensions as Indonesia's, but supplemented with a white crescent moon and five stars in a pentagram at the upper left corner of the flag, of which the red is of a slightly lighter shade.

The "Naval Jack of Indonesia" is reserved for sole use by the Indonesian Navy. It flies from the jackstaff of every active Indonesian warship while anchored or moored pierside and on special occasions. The design of the jack is described as nine alternating stripes, consisted of five red and four white stripes. It is named Lencana Perang. The naval jack dates to the age of the Majapahit Empire. This empire, renowned for its great maritime strength, flew similar jacks on its vessels.

== History ==
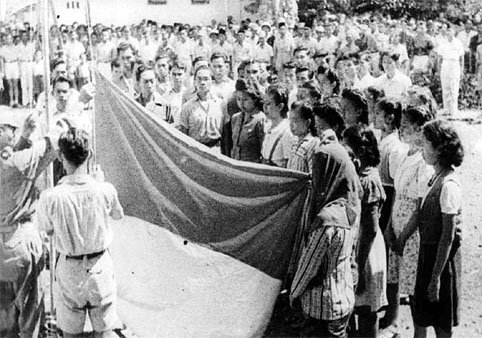
Hoisting of the Bendera Pusaka moment during the Proclamation of Indonesian Independence on 17 August 1945

Royal colors of Majapahit Empire

The flag's colours are derived from the banner of the 13th century Majapahit Empire. The earliest records of the red and white panji or pataka (a long flag on a curved bamboo pole) can be found in the Pararaton chronicle; according to this source, the Jayakatwang troops from Gelang-Gelang hoisted the red and white banner during their invasion of Singhasari in the early 12th century. This suggests that even before the Majapahit era, the red and white colours were already revered and used as the kingdom's banner in the Kediri era (1042 – c. 1222).

Red and white textile colouring was available in ancient Indonesia. White is the natural colour of woven cotton fabrics, while red is one of the earliest natural dyes, acquired from either teak leaves, the flowers of Averrhoa bilimbi, or the skin of mangosteen fruits.

It was not only the Javanese kingdoms that used red and white. The battle flag of King Si Singamangaraja IX of Batak lands bore an image of white twin swords called piso gaja dompak against a red background. During the Aceh War of 1873–1904, Aceh warriors used a battle flag with the image of a sword, star and crescent, sun, and some Quranic script in white on a red background. The red and white flag of the Buginese Bone kingdom in South Sulawesi is called Woromporang. The Balinese Badung (Puri Pamecutan) royal banner is red, white, and black. Prince Diponegoro also used a red and white banner during the Java War (1825–1830).

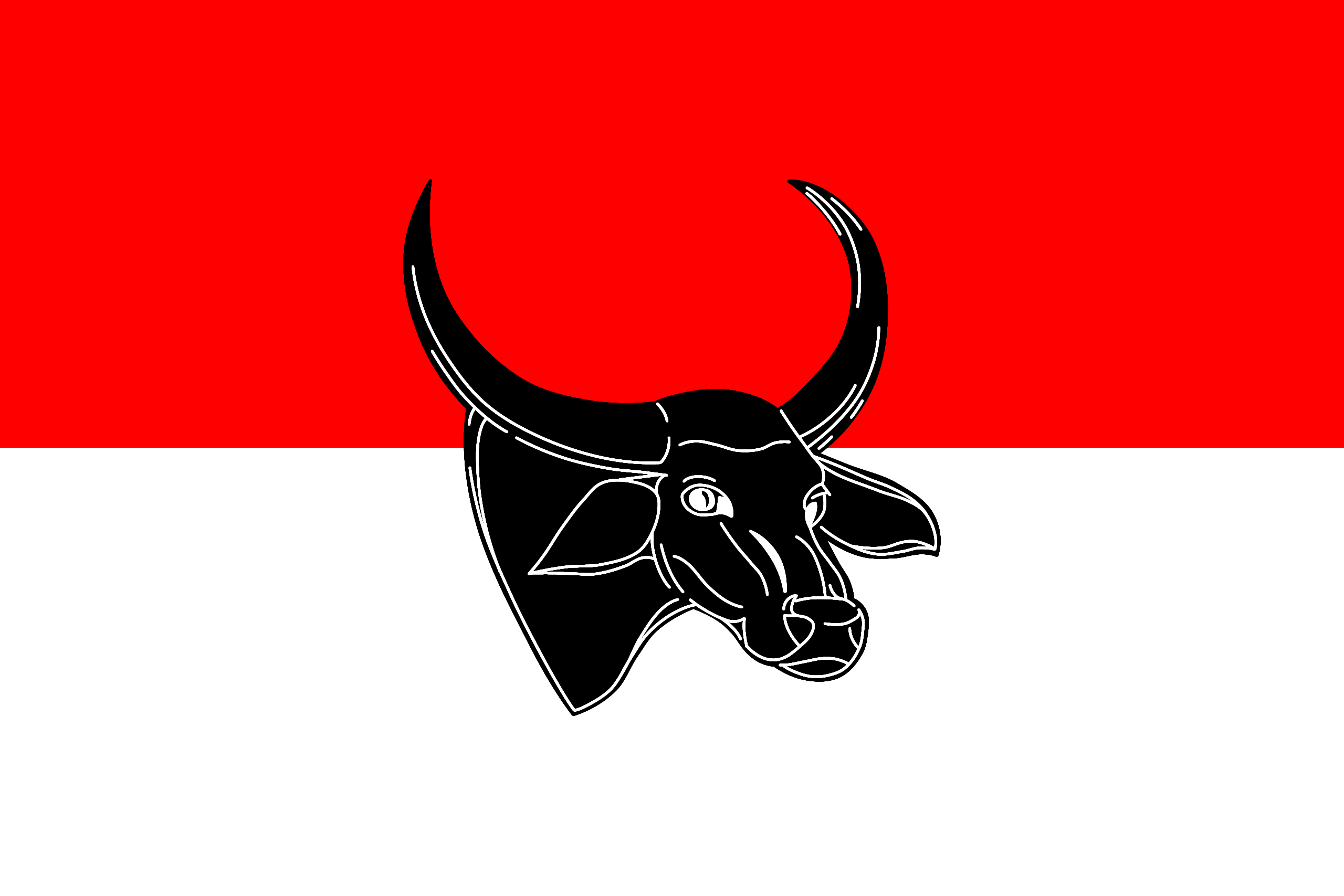
Perhimpoenan Indonesia's banteng flag from the Gedenkboek: 1908-1923 cover

In the early 20th century, these colours were revived by students and then nationalists as an expression of nationalism against the Dutch. A precursor design was first seen on the cover of a Dutch magazine titled Gedenkboek 1908-1923 run by the Perhimpoenan Indonesia ('Indonesian Association'). Compiling 13 letters written by its anonymous members, it had a sinister hoisted flag of a red and white stripe superimposed with the head of a banteng facing away from the hoist. The modern red and white flag sans banteng head was first flown in Java in 1928, it was quickly prohibited under Dutch rule. It became the flag adopted by the Kesatuan Melayu Muda to symbolise Malay nationalism against European colonialism, now widely named as the Sang Saka Malaya. Upon Indonesia's declaration of independence on 17 August 1945, it was adopted as the national flag, and has been in use ever since. After Indonesia's independence was recognized, Monaco, which had a similar flag, filed a complaint which was largely ignored.

=== Hotel Yamato incident ===
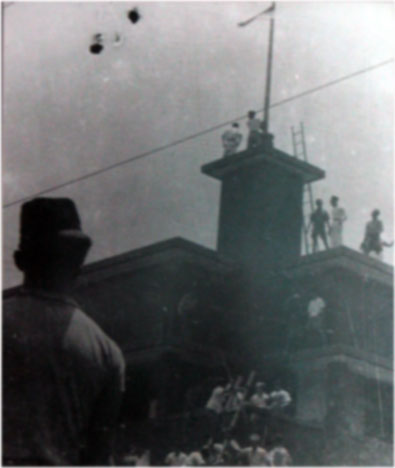
A moment after the blue stripe of a Dutch flag was torn off to make an Indonesian flag at the Hotel Yamato (now Hotel Majapahit), Surabaya

The flag featured in a well-known incident during the Indonesian War of Independence when during the lead-up to the Battle of Surabaya in late 1945, Indonesian youths removed a colonial Dutch flag flying over the Yamato Hotel, tore off the blue strip and re-hoisted it as an Indonesian flag. The hotel was subsequently renamed briefly as Hotel Merdeka, meaning "independence hotel".

Flag of the Dutch East India Company used 20 March 1602 – 1 January 1800

Flag of the Dutch East Indies used 1 January 1800 – 27 December 1949

Flag of Imperial Japan used 8 March 1942 – 17 August 1945 (3 years 5 months)

Flag of Indonesia used 17 August 1945 – present

Practice flag used for national flag replacement during rehearsals

== Name ==
According to Article 35 of the 1945 Constitution, the official name of the flag is Sang Saka Merah-Putih. The flag is commonly called Bendera Merah-Putih ('Red-and-White Flag'). Occasionally, it is also called Sang Dwiwarna ('The Bicolour'). Sang Saka Merah-Putih refers to the historical flag called Bendera Pusaka ('Heirloom Flag') and its replica. The Bendera Pusaka is the flag that was flown in front of Sukarno's house after he proclaimed Indonesia's independence on 17 August 1945. The original Bendera Pusaka was sewn by Fatmawati and was hoisted every year in front of the Merdeka Palace during the independence day ceremony. It was hoisted for the last time on 17 August 1968. Since then it has been preserved and replaced by a replica since the original flag was deemed to be too fragile.

== Symbolism ==
Several opinions have been expressed on the meaning of the red and white in the Indonesian flag. One of them is that the red stands for courage, while the white stands for purity. Another opinion is that red represents the human body or physical life, while white represents the soul or spiritual life; together they stand for a complete human being.

As Sukarno said:

Red is the symbol of courage, White is the symbol of purity. Our flag has been there for 6000 years.

The colours are the same as those used in the flag of the Majapahit.

== Colours ==
Digital scheme	RGB red	White	Physical scheme	Pigment red	White
RGB	255-0-0	255-255-255	RGB	237-28-36	255-255-255
Hex	#FF0000	#FFFFFF	Hex	#ED1C24	#FFFFFF
CMYK	0, 100, 100, 0	0, 0, 0, 0	CMYK	0, 88, 85, 7	0, 0, 0, 0

== Usage ==
=== Regulation and flag protocol ===
Hanging version of the Indonesia flag

The flag is described in Article 35, Chapter XV, of the Constitution of Indonesia; Law No. 24/2009; and Government Regulation No. 40/1958.

The national flag of Indonesia is the Red and White (Sang Merah Putih)

— Article 35, Chapter XV, Constitution of Indonesia

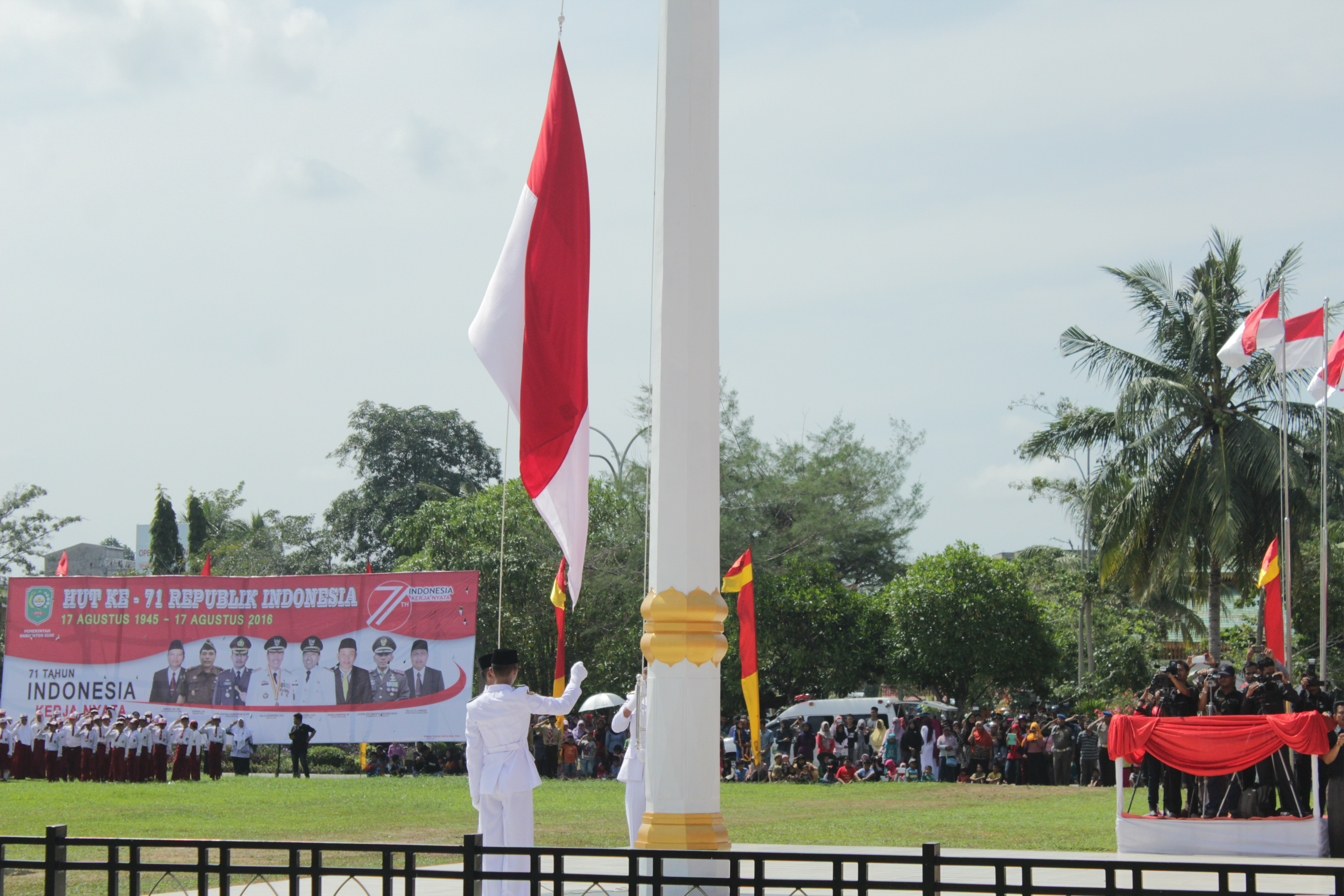
Paskibraka personnel raising the flag of Indonesia at Independence Day every year

The raising of the flag should be conducted in the time between sunrise until sunset, but in certain circumstances, it can be done at night. In daily use, the flag should be flown at every commemoration such as Indonesian Independence Day on 17 August every year, by the citizens who have a right to use it at home, building or office, schools, colleges, public and private transport and the representative office of Indonesia in overseas.

It can be used as the cover of the coffin of a President or former Presidents, Vice President or former Vice Presidents, Members of Cabinet, Speaker of People's Representative Council, and Head of Government, members of the Indonesian Armed Forces, and persons who are members of the Indonesian National Police who died in service, or an Indonesian citizen who made contributions to their nation as a badge of honor.

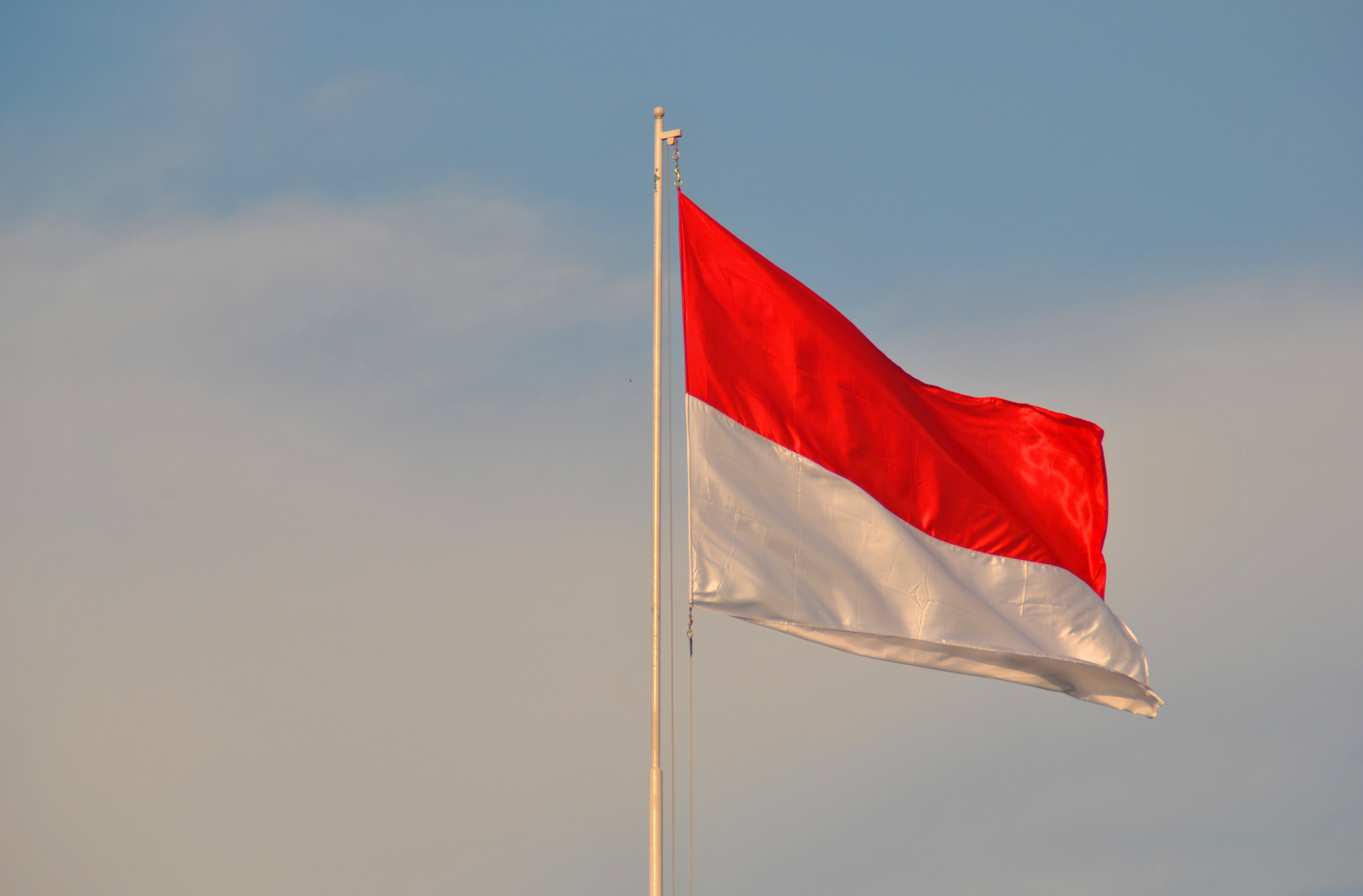
An Indonesia flag raising on office building

The flag must be displayed every day in places such as the Presidential Palace, government and private office buildings, border posts and outer islands in the territory of Indonesia, and the National Heroes Cemetery.

The flag should be displayed everywhere on special days, which are:

- 2 May: National Education Day.
- 20 May: National Awakening Day.
- 1 June: Day of the Birth of Pancasila.
- 17 August: Indonesia Independence Day.
- 28 October: Youth Pledge Day.
- 10 November: Heroes Day.

=== Half-mast ===
The flag should be displayed at half-mast as a sign of mourning on these days:

- 30 September, in remembrance of the 30 September Movement. After the Fall of Suharto and the end of the New Order in 1998, this tradition was stopped. However, the tradition of half-masting the flag on this day has been restarted in recent years.
- 12 October, in remembrance of the victims of the 2002 Bali Bombings
- 26 December, in remembrance of victims of the 2004 Indian Ocean earthquake and tsunami.
- Three days after the death of President or former Presidents, Vice President or former Vice Presidents, Members of Cabinet, Speaker of People's Representative Council, and Head of Government.
- Other mourning days established by national or local governments.

=== Prohibited acts ===
Article 24 of Law No. 24/2009 on Flags, Language, National Symbols, and Anthems, states that people are prohibited from:

1. destroying, tearing, trampling, burning, or performing other actions with the intention to tarnish, insult, or degrade the honour of the national flag;
2. using the national flag for billboards or commercials;
3. flying the national flag if it is damaged, torn, smudged, crumpled, or faded;
4. printing on, embroidering or adding letters, numbers, images or other signs, or adding badges or any objects to the national flag;
5. using the national flag to cover a ceiling or roof, or for wrapping or covering goods in a way that can degrade the honor of the national flag.

Article 66 and 67 of Law No. 24/2009 states that anyone who commits any of these prohibited acts may be punishable with imprisonment for up to five years or be subject to a fine of up to five hundred million rupiah (approximately 35,000 USD).

== See also ==
- List of flags of Indonesia
- Flags of the United States of Indonesia
- Armorial of Indonesia
- Umbul-umbul
- Sang Saka Malaya
- Flag of Indonesia size guidelines
- Flags in same color and alignment:
  - Flag of Monaco
  - Flag of Alsace
  - Flag of Hesse
- Flags in same color, but inverted alignment:
  - Flag of Poland
  - Flag of Bohemia
