= Paskibraka =

Flag-raising squad and youth activity organization in Indonesia

- Pasukan Pengibar Bendera Pusaka
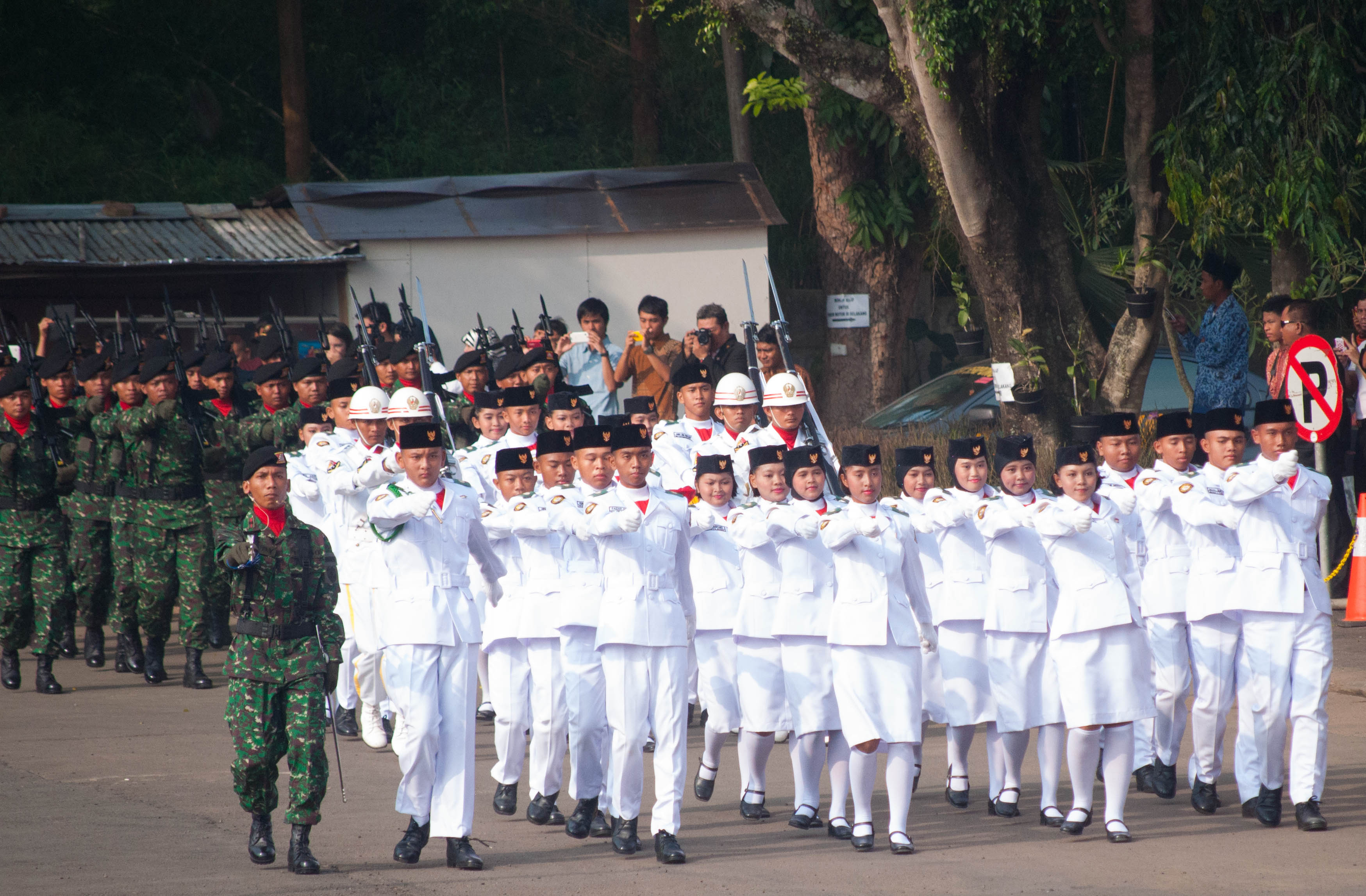
- Paskibraka marching with the Indonesian Army in South Tangerang, 2013
- Formation: 1946 (present-day format from 1967)
- Founder: Husein Mutahar
- Type: National Youth Organization (Ceremonial)
- Legal status: Disciplinary school-formed organization
- Purpose: To escort, raise and lower the national flag of Indonesia during national ceremonies regionally and nationally
- Headquarters: Jakarta
- Location(s): National level (Merdeka Palace), Provincial level, and City level throughout Indonesia
- Methods: Marching (Goose step)
- PPI Chairman: Gousta Feriza, SH., MH
- Parent organization: Pancasila Ideology Development Agency
- Website: https://paskibraka.bpip.go.id

The Paskibraka (Indonesian: Pasukan Pengibar Bendera Pusaka, lit. 'National Flag Hoisting Troop') is a youth troop-formed organization and/or flag-raising squad in Indonesia which has the main task to escort, raise and lower the heirloom national flag of Indonesia (now duplicate) in Independence day ceremonies commemorating the independence day of Indonesia (17 August) throughout Indonesia.

Its members are grade 10 or 11 high school students selected from schools regionally. Its mission is to provide flag bearers and escorts for national flag ceremonies commemorating Independence Day in the city, province, and national level in Indonesia as well as in some international functions at overseas Indonesian installations (e.g embassies and/or consulates). It was founded by Major (Ret.) Husein Mutahar, and till this day, organized by a national organization with its HQ in Jakarta known as the "National Paskibraka Council" (Purna Paskibraka Indonesia, PPI) under the auspices of the Pancasila Ideology Development Agency (formerly under the Ministry of Youth and Sports until 2022).

== Pre-1967 ==
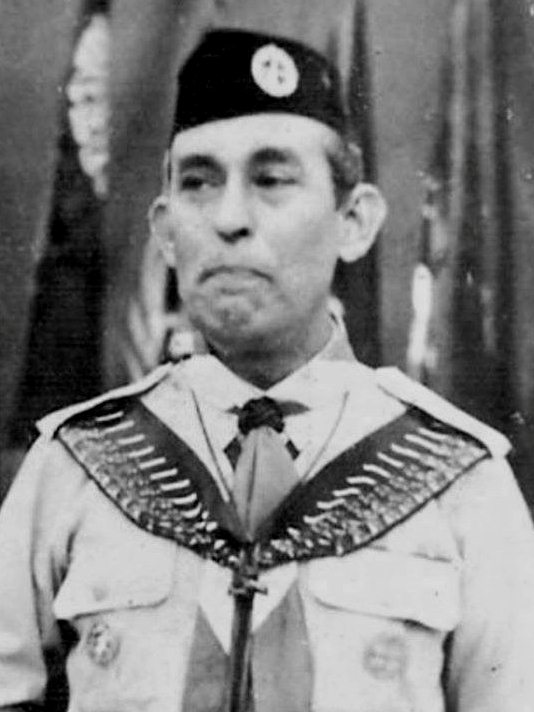
Husein Mutahar, founder of Paskibraka

Major Husein Mutahar of the Indonesian Navy was the one who in August 1946, just as the Indonesian National Revolution was raging, oversaw the first national flag raising ceremony on the 17th that month in Yogyakarta in commemoration of the 1st anniversary of national independence, presided by President Sukarno at the Gedung Agung Palace. With 5 other youths with him as the escorts, he raised the Bendera Pusaka (the Flag of Indonesia) just as Indonesia Raya was played by a military band to a joyful populace. It would be repeated again in 1947 and 1949.

With the transfer of the capital to Jakarta, Mutahar did not see any flag raising ceremonies until 1966 at the Merdeka Palace but the flag raising method still remained.

A prototype flag formation of students and youth would be present in the 1962 Independence Day ceremony in Jakarta, and that ceremony and others would convince Mutahar that the time was now ripe to make it a permanent fixture.

== First national appearance ==
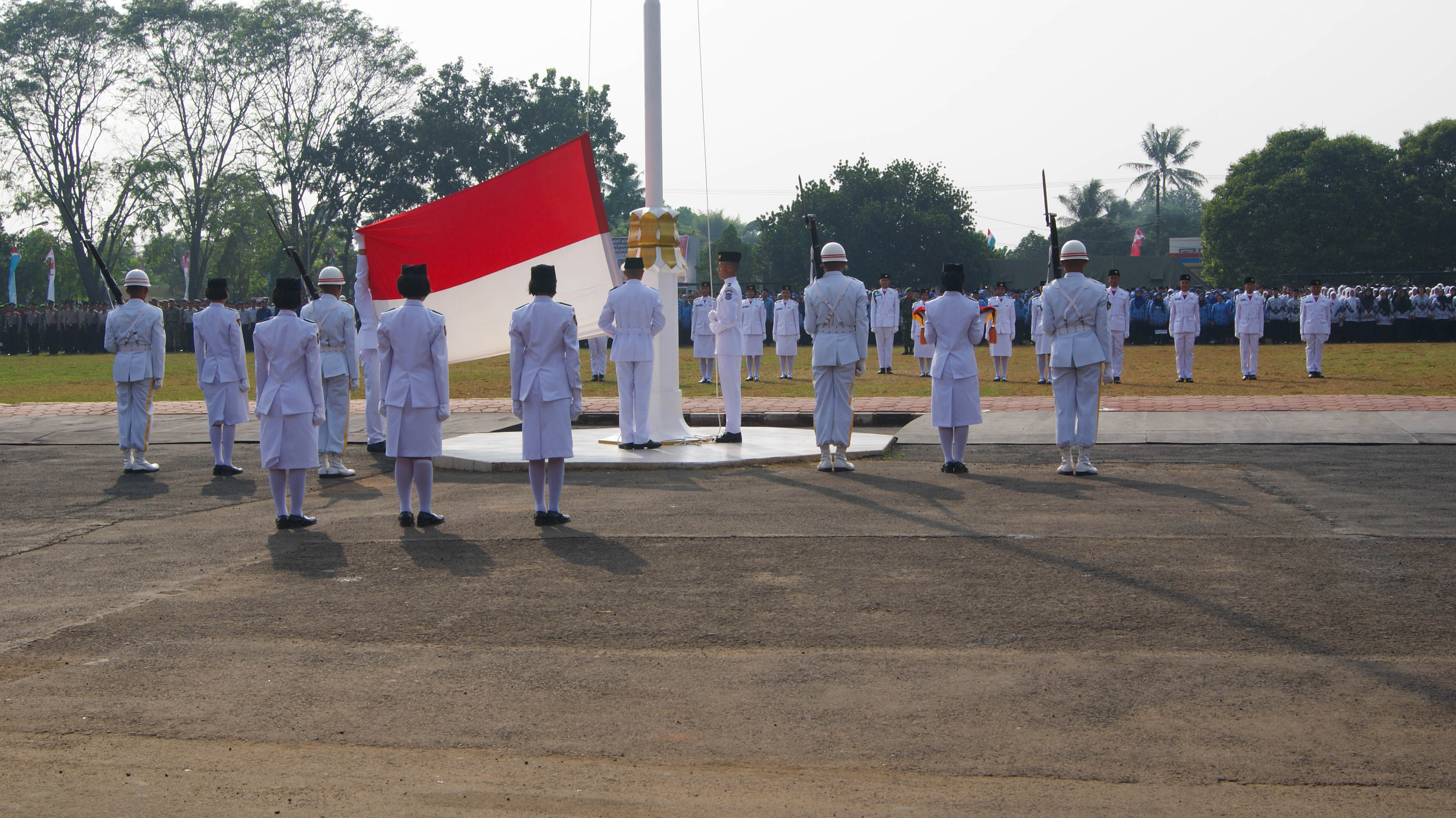
Paskibraka extending the national flag before it is raised

In time for the 22nd anniversary of independence in 1967, Mutahar, at that time retired and in his older years, approached the then President Suharto with a plan to form today's Paskibraka (Pasukan Pengibar Bendera Pusaka) or the "National Heirloom Flag Hoisting Troop", with a ceremonial mission to escort, hoist and lower the national flag during Independence Day ceremony and other national holiday celebrations in the national and regional levels throughout the country. He has chosen the Youth as the Paskibraka to symbolize the importance of their role in the development of the nation in the future. It is to symbolize patriotism and nationalism towards the youth and the people of Indonesia.

His idea of the Flag Hoisting Troop (Paskibraka) would be a 70-man color troop made up of:

- 17-man color advance unarmed platoon with the company commander (formerly provided by the scouts)
- 8-man color guard party and escort
- A platoon of armed 45 personnel divided into 4 squads as the Guard of honour unit. During the first years, it was provided by special forces of the Indonesian National Armed Forces on the basis of the then disbanded Tjakrabirawa Regiment. Today it is provided by the Paspampres honor guard unit for the national-level flag hoisting ceremony in the Merdeka Palace and by the armed forces or the Police in provincial, city and regency level ceremonies

(The numbers are a reminder of the day Indonesia achieved independence, 17-8-1945.)

The first official Paskibraka Troop took part in the flag raising and lowering ceremonies on Independence Day 1967, which were also covered on Televisi Republik Indonesia, therefore making their first national appearance while at the background the military band played the national anthem while they raised the national flag. (Until 1972 it was named as the Pasukan Pengerek Bendera Pusaka, the present form, Pasukan Pengibar Bendera Pusaka or "Paskibraka", coined by Idik Sulaiman, was adopted in 1973.)

Starting 1968 flag escort platoons modeled on the one in Jakarta were mandated to be raised in the Provinces, cities and regencies of Indonesia for major national holiday ceremonies, it would be the last year the old first sewed national flag would be used in the national ceremonies held in Jakarta. The next year a replica flag took its place in all national ceremonies in Jakarta, and high school students took over the job of providing the color party and the advance platoon, with their red scarf and white dress uniforms and black songkok caps which would become the signature uniform of the Paskibraka troop until today.

== Current Tasks ==
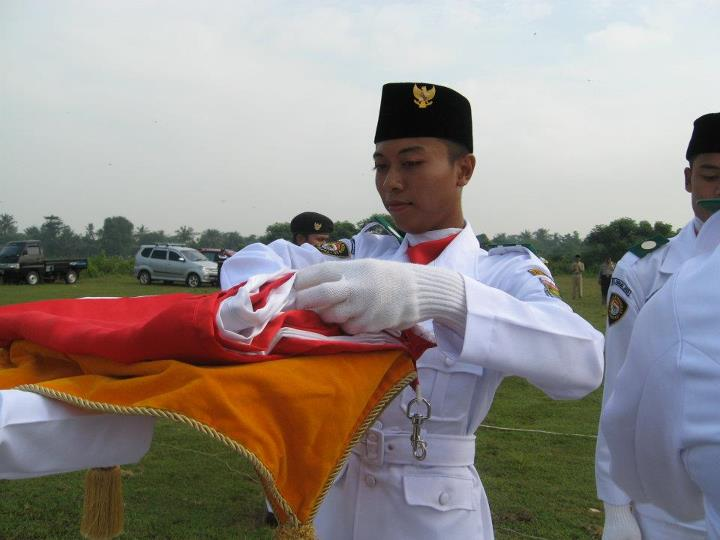
Indonesian flag raising squad (Paskibraka) wearing peci as part of their uniform

Nowadays, the Paskibraka has the tasks to implement their duties in three levels of state-ceremonial occasions for the independence day commemoration of Indonesia which are at the national level (located in Merdeka Palace, and the President as the guest of honor), provincial level (governor as the inspector), city level (city mayor as the inspector) and regency level (presided by the regent). Students chosen to become Paskibraka personnel are selected from public or private schools and are based on good physical, posture, and academics, the best ones are chosen to serve at the national level (at Merdeka Palace in Jakarta) usually with two pairs of male and female from each province in Indonesia, and are sent to the national level in Jakarta as the "National Paskibraka", whereas Paskibraka serving in Provincial, City and Regency level are also regarded as best school students serving for their country, but the most prestigious is becoming part of the "National Paskibraka" especially for the female student who will carry the national flag from the honor tribune to the flagpole.

Post conducting their duties, they will become Purna Paskibraka Indonesia (Paskibraka Alumni of Indonesia) and former members have duties to become active in the Paskibraka organization to conduct training, mentoring, and sharing skills to their juniors which are going to become Paskibraka members. Paskibraka members change every year per school, and a paskibraka member will only carry out his/her duty once in a lifetime if chosen by the government unit or directly by the national government to be a part of this unit.

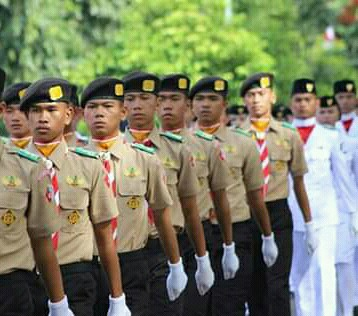
The scouts serving as colour advance platoon for the Paskibra

=== Paskibra ===
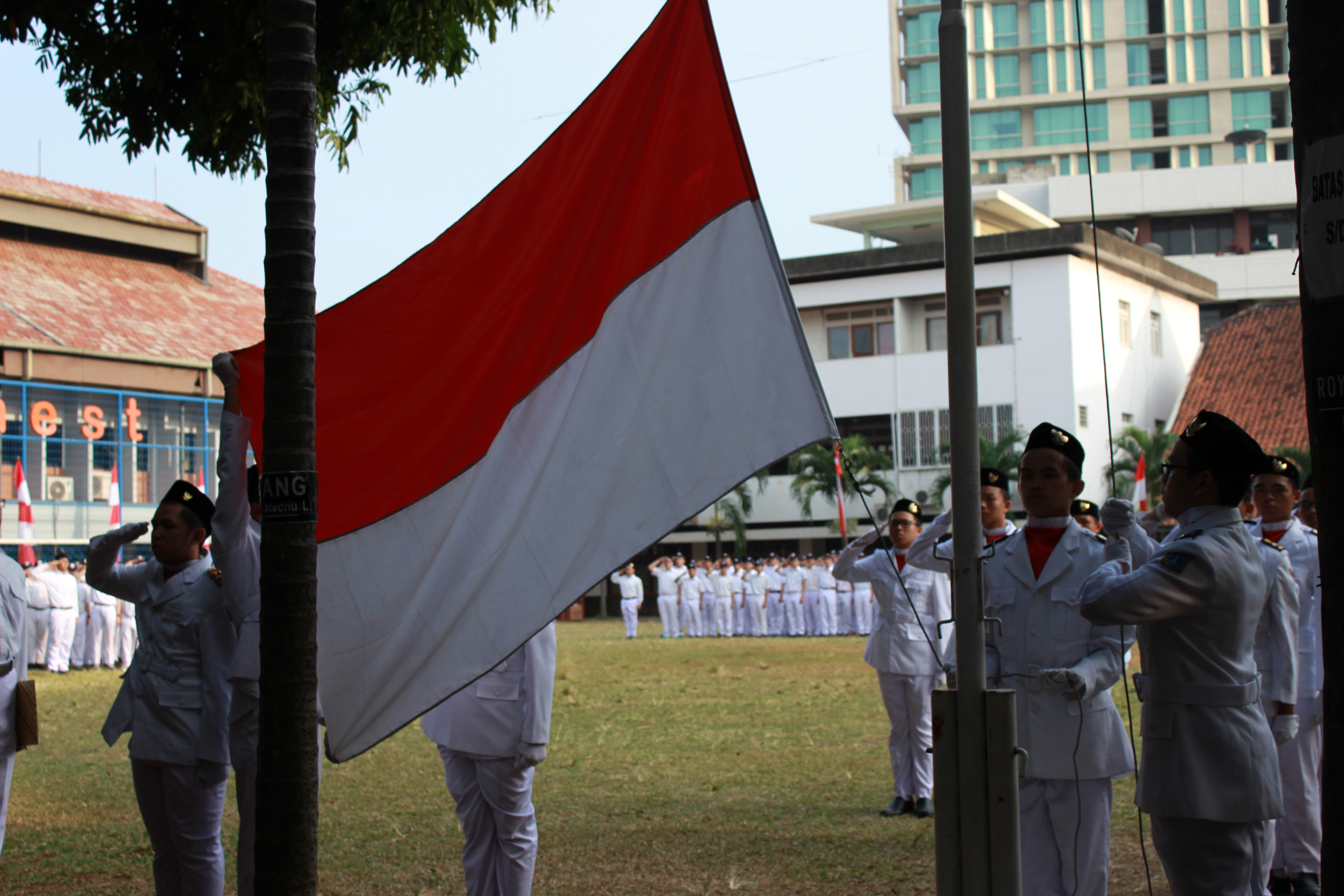
Paskibra students hoisting the flag of Indonesia in their school

Paskibra (a portmanteau of Pasukan Pengibar Bendera or "Flag Hoisting Troop") refers to an Extracurricular activity which are present in most junior to senior high schools throughout Indonesia. Its activities are mostly Marching, Disciplinary activities, and leadership training. It is also tasked for raising the national flag in schools during Monday-morning ceremonies. Most Paskibraka members come from this extracurricular activity back in their respective schools.

=== Armed escort ===
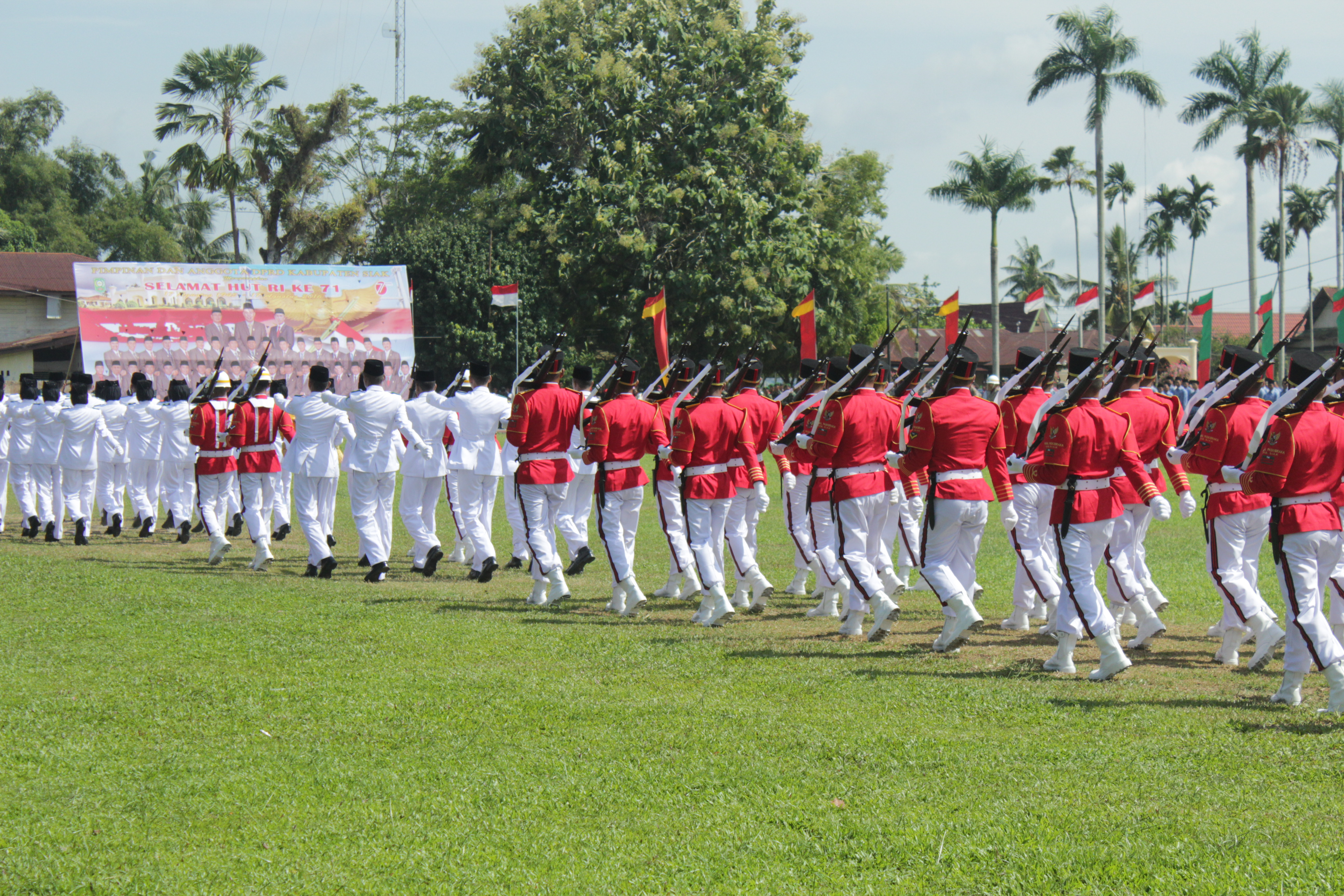
45 armed personnel usually originates from Military or Police forces tasked to serve with the Paskibraka during independence commemoration ceremonies in Indonesia as the honor guard

Whenerever they are available, there would be a 45-man guard escort platoon armed with the M-16 or Pindad SS1 assault rifle in cities and provinces as well as select regencies. Some guard platoons would be armed with the current standard issue Pindad SS2 rifle. In 2022, a common uniform for the regional guard platoon was unveiled, a similar red uniform to that used in Jakarta but with service specific rank and branch insignia with the guard commander wearing his or her officer's shoulder board and a ceremonial sabre, speciality patches and brevets, and the M1 helmet rather than the shako used in the capital's ceremony (Jakarta and some other areas use the shako and white hackle instead of the combat helmet). 2023 saw several provincial and city guard platoons have a white variant of the uniform debut instead of the red. Until 2019, the regional guard platoon wore the branch specific dress or battle dress uniform with either the M1 or a branch specific beret for military or police forces, a few areas still retain the practice.

In 2024, the shako was dropped from the Paspampres honor platoon, replaced with the peaked cap.

== See also ==
- Flag of Indonesia
- Scouts of Indonesia
