= Beyond Coma and Despair =

Studio album by Burgerkill
- Released: August 2006
- Recorded: March–April 2006
- Studios: Massive Studio, Diablo Studio, Bandung
- Genres: Metalcore, death metal, thrash metal
- Length: 55:55
- Labels: Revolt!, Xenophobic
- Producers: Yayat Achdiyat, Burgerkill

Burgerkill chronology
Dua Sisi (Repacked) (2004)	Beyond Coma and Despair (2006)	Venomous (2011)

Beyond Coma and Despair is the third album by Indonesian metal band Burgerkill, released in 2006. The album was also released in Australia two years later. This is the band's last album to feature Ivan Scumbag on lead vocals before his death in July 2006. Two music videos were produced for "Shadow of Sorrow" and "Angkuh". Rolling Stone Indonesia magazine ranked the album No. 113 on their "150 Greatest Indonesian Albums of All Time" list.

== Background ==
Burgerkill began to work on Beyond Coma and Despair in early 2005, where at the same time, Toto left the band after nine years together as drummer to pursue his career outside the band. He was replaced by Andris, who at that time was playing bass, and did double-duty during recording. Recording was completed by September 2005 with studio production between March-April 2006. This coincided with the end of their collaboration with Sony Music Indonesia due to no agreement by both parties regarding the album materials. the band released the album through own Revolt! Records label in August 2006. A few weeks before the album was released, Ivan Firmansyah, known as "Ivan Scumbag", died. The album launch continued with Teguh ("Right 88") and Yadi ("Motordead") temporarily filling-in. During this period, Ramdan joined the band on bass guitar and Vicky joined through an audition to be vocalist. "Beyond Coma and Despair" consists of 12 songs including 1 cover song "Atur Aku" of "Puppen", written by Robin Malau and Arian Arifin known as "Arian 13" ("Seringai").

A limited vinyl run of the album was released on September 18, 2014 in Bandung.

== Track listing ==
The tracks titled in Bahasa were translated literally into English for Global observer. All songs arrangements, composed by Eben, Agung and Ivan Scumbag. except those listed.

No.	Title	Lyrics	Length
1.	"Darah Hitam Kebencian" (Black Blood of Hatred)		6:22
2.	"We Will Bleed"		3:29
3.	"Shadow of Sorrow"		4:02
4.	"Laknat" (Anathema)		3:13
5.	"Angkuh" (Arrogant)		4:30
6.	"Suffer to Death"		5:44
7.	"Anjing Tanah" (Soil Dog)		6:40
8.	"Last Escape"		4:12
9.	"Agony Remains Insane"		2:42
10.	"Atur Aku" (Control Me)	Robin Malau, Arian Arifin	4:28
11.	"Beyond Coma and Despair"		4:50
12.	"Unblessing Life"		5:43
Total length:			55:55

== Line-up ==
Burgerkill

- Ivan Scumbag – vocals
- Andris – drums, bass
- Agung – guitar
- Eben – lead guitar

Production

- Yayat Ahdiyat – producer
- Eben BKHC – artwork

Additional musicians

- Ramdan – session bass, tour bassist
- Vicky – tour vocals
- Achan – tour lead guitar, scream vocal
- Yadi - tour vocal
- Teguh - tour vocal
