= Hantu Jeruk Purut =

2006 Indonesian horror film

- Indonesian release poster
- Directed by: Koya Pagayo
- Written by: Ery Sofid
- Produced by: Shanker R.S.
- Starring: Samuel Z. Heckenbucker; Sheila Marcia; Angie Virgin
- Cinematography: Dharmadjie
- Edited by: Krisnatandra
- Music by: Teguh Pribadi
- Production company: Indika Entertainment
- Distributed by: Indika Entertainment
- Release date: 30 November 2006
- Running time: 91 minutes
- Country: Indonesia
- Language: Indonesian

Hantu Jeruk Purut (The Ghost of the Kaffir Lime Cemetery) is a 2006 Indonesian horror film directed by Koya Pagayo and starring Angie Virgin, Sheila Marcia Joseph, and Samuel Z Heckenbucker. It tells the story of an aspiring writer who is haunted by the ghost she is investigating.

== Plot ==
Anna, a mystery writer, visits Jeruk Purut Cemetery to investigate its legendary headless pastor ghost. After beginning to write about it, she is haunted by the ghost and, fearing for her life, gives her notes to her fan, high school student Airin (Angie). Anna is subsequently killed.

Seeing the notes as an opportunity to become a famous writer, Airin visits Jeruk Purut with her friends Nadine (Sheila Marcia Joseph) and Valen (Samuel Z Heckenbucker) to investigate the ghost. After circling the cemetery seven times, an act believed to summon it, they return home. The ghost soon visits Airin and warns that continuing Anna's work will bring suffering upon her, her friends and her family. Airin nevertheless decides to continue writing about it.

Soon afterwards, Airin's mother and friends suffer a series of accidents. Nadine is struck by an exploding gas cylinder, while Valen is chased by a kuntilanak named Lasmi and eventually runs into electrical wires. While Airin visits Valen in hospital with Nadine and Cessa (Valia Rahma), Nadine becomes possessed by the ghost, knocks Cessa unconscious and attempts to strangle Airin. Airin escapes into the morgue, pursued by Nadine. Just before Nadine can kill her, Cessa stabs Nadine in the chest, killing her, but the ghost continues to pursue Airin.

Airin eventually discovers the truth behind the haunting. Years earlier, a young man attempted to rape Lasmi, a pastor's servant. When the pastor intervened, the man killed both of them. He then disguised himself in the pastor's clothes to deceive the locals, but was eventually caught and decapitated. He later became the headless ghost haunting the cemetery.

== Production ==
The story for Hantu Jeruk Purut was inspired by the "Hantu Jeruk Purut" urban legend in South Jakarta, which had circulated for several decades. The urban legend deals with sightings of a headless ghost around Jeruk Purut cemetery. The legend holds that the ghost only reveals itself to odd-numbered groups of people.

Before production, the cast and crew went to Jeruk Purut to request the ghost's permission to shoot the film. While at the cemetery, two of those present, an actress named Yuni and a reporter from TV7, fainted. After they were diagnosed by a local kyai as having been possessed, those present attempted to communicate with the spirit. Receiving no response, the kyai told the crew to offer cigars, chicken eggs, palm sugar, and coffee to the spirits in glass containers before commencing filming.

Filming took place in numerous locations in Jakarta and the surrounding area, including an abandoned hospital and houses. According to Joseph, while filming she experienced several strange happenings. She recalled that she and Angie saw the spirit of a child appear suddenly while filming in Ciawi, Bogor. While drawing the scissors to film the stabbing scene, Joseph lost control and released them; the scissors flew and struck Angie on the left temple.

Hantu Jeruk Purut was Joseph's first horror film. She later commented that it was extremely tiring.

== Reception ==
Hantu Jeruk Purut premiered at the Planet Hollywood in Jakarta on 29 November 2006. Audiences filled the 1195-seat theatre, requiring an additional showing. It received a wider release in Indonesia and Malaysia on November 30 that year.

Dwita, writing in a review for Suara Karya, said that Hantu Jeruk Purut gave her goosebumps, with the sound, visuals, and plot deserving a thumbs up. However, Nur Hasan, writing for Detik.com, said that the cemetery background seemed fake, made to appear overly dark and gloomy, with the suspense lacking as the ghost was shown from the start. Benny Benke, writing for Suara Merdeka, said that the film left the impression that novelists are the professionals most-hated by ghosts, and the actors' performances were "nothing special".

== Notes ==
1. Original: "... tak istimewa ..."
