= Venomous (album) =

Studio album by Burgerkill
- Released: 11 June 2011
- Recorded: January – June 2011
- Studio: Massive Studio, Bandung
- Genre: Groove metal, metalcore
- Length: 59:50
- Label: Xenophobic, Revolt!
- Producer: Burgerkill, Yayat Ahdiat

Burgerkill chronology
Beyond Coma and Despair (2006)	Venomous (2011)

Venomous is the fourth studio album by Indonesian metal band Burgerkill, released in June 2011. Venomous is the first album to feature the vocals of lead vocalist Vicky.

The album became a success in the local heavy metal music scene. In the first week of album promo concert at Bandung Berisik, a local metal venue, about 1,000 compact disks were sold. It was listed third after Satu Untuk Berbagi and Jemima as the best studio album release for 2011 by Rolling Stone Indonesia.

== Album concept ==
In an interview, Eben explains to Mahardhika Utama of Formagz, an Indonesian online music magazine, the reason behind the chosen name:

...So, our main target is not being number one Indonesian metal band, but we just wanna be the most dangerous metal band in Indonesia, that's why we named our latest album Venomous!.

In the same time Vicky explained about musical style and influences:

Whatever that we listen to this album. We are open minded to it, all of us have their own style and influences, and we commit to make this one real. I myself often listen to some Swedish band such as Meshuggah, I also listen to Slipknot and many more.

== Track listing ==
No.	Title	Length
1.	"Into the Tunnel" (Instrumental intro)	1:14
2.	"Age of Versus"	5:34
3.	"Under the Scars"	5:17
4.	"Through the Shine"	4:26
5.	"House of Greed"	6:57
6.	"This Coldest Heart" (Instrumental)	3:37
7.	"For Victory"	6:45
8.	"My Worst Enemy"	6:32
9.	"Only the Strong"	5:46
10.	"An Elegy" (Bonus track)	13:38
Total length:		59:50

== Reception ==
Professional ratings
Review scores
Source	Rating
Loud	(90%)
The Metal Forge	7.5/10 stars
Rolling Stone	4/5 stars
Rave Magazine	3/5 stars
Space Ship News	(Favorable)
Metal Hammer	8/10 stars
Heavy Magazine	(Favorable)
Louder	4/5 stars

Venomous was well received by several critics. Brian Fischer Giffin of "LoudMag", an Australian online music magazine stated that:

Venomous isn't reinventing the wheel and is not the most original album you'll ever hear – they wear their influences prominently – but at the same time it is also something right out of the box. Ordinarily I would suggest that any band trying a mix of early Sepultura-style thrash, Morbid Angel, commercial metalcore and dashes of electronica would be doomed to fail, but not these guys. Somehow, they've managed to pull it off and do it very well...

Rod Whitfield of "Metal Forge" magazine expressed his surprise reaction to Venomous, and wrote:

Behind this rather comical band name lies a real and pleasant surprise. Indonesia is obviously not a known Mecca for hard rock and metal in the world, but these guys are apparently their biggest and best metal act. Apparently they've also been around for more than 15 years, which is arguably the biggest surprise of all. And it's fantastic to see the global reach of our favourite style of music.

== Personnel ==
- Eben – guitars
- Ramdan – bass
- Vicky – vocals
- Andris – drums
- Agung – guitars

Credits

- Burgerkill – arranger, producer
- Didin Bahe – band photo
- Citra Frolic – consultant
- Begundal Hellclub – choir, chorus
- Ammy Strings Quartet – strings, arranger
- Agung Hellfrog – vocals
- Yayat Ahdiat – producer, mastering, engineer, mixing
- Ramdan Agus – bass, group member, engineer
- Innu Regawa – engineer, digital editing
- Gus Satrianang – guitars
