= Java Rockin'land =

Indonesian rock music festival

- Genre: Rock
- Dates: August 7–9, 2009; October 8–10, 2010; July 22–24, 2011
- Locations: Carnaval Beach, Ancol Dreamland, Jakarta, Indonesia
- Years active: 2009-Present
- Website: javarockingland.com

Java Rockin'land (known as Java Rockingland) was a 3-day rock festival held each year in the lakeside of Carnaval Beach, Ancol Dreamland, Jakarta.

== Java Rockin'land's fact 2009-2012 ==
Year	Tagline	Date	No. of Stages	International Artists	Indonesian Artists	Est. Attendance
2009	Rock Life Never Before	August 7–9	10	Bagga Bownz, Joujouka, Melee, Mew, Motherjane (India), Mr. Big, Renaissance Blvd, Secondhand Serenade, Third Eye Blind, Vertical Horizon	/rif, Agrikulture, Alexa, Amazing In Bed, Anda with The Joints, Andra & The Backbone, Armada Racun, Bagaikan, Bangkutaman, Beside, Bite, Bitter Ballen, Bunga, Burgerkill, Clover, Deadsquad, Denial, Drew, DVD Boy, Efek Rumah Kaca, Endank Soekamti, Everybody Loves Irene, Fall, Friends of Mine, Ghaust, Gigi, Goodnight Electric, Holy City Rollers, Invictus, J Rocks, Killed by Butterfly, Killing Me Inside, Koil, Komunal, Krayola, Kunci, Mike's Apartment, Monkey to Millionaire, Naif, Navicula, Netral, Noxa, Papergangster, Pee Wee Gaskins, Pure Saturday, Risky Summerbee & the Honeythief, Rock n Roll Mafia, Saint Loco, Sajama Cut, Seringai, She, Skalie, Slank, Sore, Speedkill, Suicidal Sinatra, Superglad, Superman Is Dead, The Adams, The Borstal, The Brandals, The Flowers, The Monophones, The S.I.G.I.T., The Sabotage, The Southern Beach Terror, The Upstairs, Tika & the Dissidents, Time Bomb Blues, Vox, White Shoes & The Couples Company, Zeke and the Popo	± 47,000
2010	Can You Handle It?	October 8–10	10	Arkarna, Dashboard Confessional, Datarock, Di-rect, Galaxy 7, Living Things, Mutemath, Not Called Jinx, Social Code, Stereophonics, Steve Fister, The Smashing Pumpkins, Wolfmother, The Vines, Stryper	/rif, Aftercoma, Aksiterror, Alexa, Amazing In Bed, Bagaikan, Beside, BIP, Bite, Blackout, Burgerkill, Cemetery Dance Club, Dead Squad, Friends of Mine, Goodboy Badminton, Gugun Blues Shelter, Hyder, In Hurricane Rhythm, Jikunsprain, Jolly Jumper, Killed By Butterfly, KOIL, Kotak, Kripik Peudeus, Last Child, Mobil Derek, Monday Math Class, Morfem, Netral, Noxa, Papergangster, PAS band, Polyester Embassy, Pure Saturday, Purgatory, Rocket Rockers, Royal Ego, Saint Loco, Seringai, Silent Farewell, SLANK, Something About Lola, Speaker First, Stereocase, Stereomantic, Superglad, Superman Is Dead, Sweet As Revenge, The Authentics, The Bohemians, The Brandals, The Experience Brothers, The Flowers, The S.I.G.I.T, The Trees & The Wild, Thirteen, Yes It's You	± 57,000
2011		July 22–24	10	Blood Red Shoes, Ed Kowalczyk of LIVE, Franco, Frente, Good Charlotte, Happy Mondays, Helloween, Kensington, Loudness, Neon Trees, The Cranberries, The Dirt Radicals, Thirty Seconds to Mars, We Are Scientists, Young The Giant	Monkey Boots, /rif, 7 Deadly Sins, Aftercoma, Afternoon Talk, Alien Sick, Alone At Last, Angsa & Serigala, Backalley, Ballerina, Besok Bubar, Betrayer, BIP, Bitter Ballen, Blood Diamond, Bobby Jones, Burgerkill, Cleo, Closehead, Cokelat, Cupumanik, Di-Da, Divide, Dried Cassava, Easy Tiger, Edane, Emirates, Fable, Factory Lab DJ set, Fall, Fall Of Mira, Float, For Better Life Movement, Forgotten, Fourwall, Free On Saturday, Frozen on the 12, G-Pluck Beatles, Gaspoll, Gecko, Gigantor, Godbless, Gugun Blues Shelter, Gunver, High Time Rebellion, Innocenti, Jasad, Kelelawar Malam, Killing Me Inside, Konspirasi, Kunci, Leonardo, Lucky Annash, L'alphalpha, Maddening Pace, Madonna Of The Rocks, March, Master Wu, Morfem, Munthe, Muvann, Naif, Netral, No Label, PAL / NTSC, Parau, PAS Band, Polyester Embassy, Power Metal, Power Slaves, Psychotic Angels, Pure Saturday, Radical Of Revolution, Raja Singa, Raksasa, Ray D Sky, Real, Rocker Kasarunk, Roxx, Sarasvati, Seringai, Sheila On 7, Sir Dandy, Solitaire Addict, Sound Of Silence, Speak Up, SpeedKill, Stepforward, Stereosoul, Superglad, Tengkorak, The Changcuters, The Ginger, The Milo, The Morning After, The Trees and The Wild, The Upstairs DJ Set, Tohpati Bertiga, Tor, Vegan, Wonderbra, X-Shibuya, X-THREE special project, Zewex	± 60.000
2012	Rock At Own Risk!	July 6–8	Canceled	Canceled	Canceled	Canceled
