= Death metal in Indonesia =

Indonesian musical scene

Death metal, a form of heavy metal music. Along with the main genre of Indonesian heavy metal, death metal is extensively popular in the country of Indonesia and maintains a vast regional scene since the early 90s. Prominent bands include Jasad, Burgerkill, Asphyxiate and Purgatory.

Due to sheer distance from the geographical origins of death metal in Europe and North America, Indonesia is not typically considered to be a major segment of the worldwide death metal scene. However, some Indonesian bands, such as Noxa, have played at major global extreme music festivals, including Obscene Extreme. The relative isolation of the scene, and comments made by Indonesian President Joko Widodo, in which he listed the grindcore/death metal band Napalm Death amongst his favourite bands, has aroused significant global media interest in the scene.

== Historical context ==
Indonesia is an archipelagic country of approximately 18,000 islands stretching along the equator in South East Asia. The area of Indonesia is populated by peoples of various migrations, creating a diversity of cultures, ethnicities, and languages. An attempted coup in 1965 led to a violent army-led anti-communist purge in which over half a million people were killed. General Suharto politically outmaneuvered President Sukarno, and became president in March 1968. In the aftermath of Suharto's rise, under the New Order regime, hundreds of thousands of people were killed or imprisoned by the military and religious groups in a backlash against alleged communist supporters, with direct support from the United States.

In the late 1990s, however, Indonesia was the country hardest hit by the East Asian Financial Crisis, resulting in political and economic instability, social unrest, corruption, and terrorism. The crisis eroded domestic confidence with the New Order and led to popular protests. The Reformasi era following Suharto's resignation, led to a strengthening of democratic processes, including a regional autonomy program, the secession of East Timor, and the first direct presidential election in 2004.

The process of Reformasi also resulted in a higher degree of freedom of speech, in contrast to the pervasive censorship under the New Order. This has led to a more open political debate in the news media and increased expression in the arts, especially within Indonesian musical spheres. Concurrent with the increasing cultural liberalisation, Indonesians began to consume a greater variety of media, including early bootlegs of grindcore recordings.

=== Presence in Indonesia ===
Due to the widespread proliferation of death metal and other western music styles into Indonesia via tape trading throughout the 1980s and 1990s, there is no definitive date to determine when a death metal fandom in the country developed. Vocalist of early Indonesian stoner metal act Seringai, Arian 13 told Vice in 2017 that the 1990 Napalm Death album Harmony Corruption was one of the "first nationally available death metal/grind albums", possessing an "obviously huge" impact upon the development of the scene. A number of prominent death metal acts were formed throughout the 1990s and early 2000s, with Jasad being formed in 1990, Funeral Inception in 2000, and Noxa in 2002.

Napalm Death directly inspired a number of Indonesian musicians, with the brutal death metal band Jasad especially citing Napalm Death as an influence on their early sound, and the vocalist of Tengkorak recalling that he learned how to scream by listening to the vocal patterns of Barney Greenway. Arif "Gobel" Budiman, of Rottenomicon, also told Vice that his band probably wouldn't have existed if it wasn't for Harmony Corruption. Vice also noted Napalm Death's 2005 concert in Ancol, North Jakarta, as the event that "cemented Indonesia's place as a must-stop country on the extreme music world tour circuit". The foundation of the death metal scene in East Bandung, according to Forgotten vocalist Addy Gembel, occurred concurrently with the ongoing industrialisation of a previously semi-rural farming community, reflective of the anxieties generated by such historical development.

Indonesian death metal has even aroused interest from labels in regions where the genre is more popular, with Dutch D.I.Y label Extreme Terror Production releasing a compilation featuring exclusively Indonesian bands entitled Grindonesia.

=== Artistry ===
The Indonesian metal scene as a whole is largely characterised by the centrality of the values of respect, politeness, tolerance, and patience within Indonesian culture, in addition to a general unwillingness to criticise others. This is in direct contrast to the confrontational, and often provocative themes present in the death metal of Europe and the US. As James notes, a majority of the scenes members are broadly socially conservative and respectful members of a pluralistic and diverse, but hierarchical society. Indonesian metal musicians usually separate their own personal religious beliefs from their music, although there are exceptions to this. However, underground bands are bold and they are open to criticizing the politics of Indonesia.

== One Finger Movement ==
The One Finger Movement was a collective of pro-Islamic and anti-Zionist bands, fans and venues based around Jakarta, originating in the early 2000s. Wallach identified that it primarily aimed to 'spiritually nourish and encourage' religious people who already have an active interest in metal music. Whilst based in Jakarta, it also possessed some influence in East Java and Sumatra. In a 2011 interview, Jason Hutagalung, an Australian-based Indonesian music promoter and tattoo artist, estimated that the One Finger Movement comprised about 20% of the Jakarta scene at its peak. The movement was named after the one finger sign (meaning 'one god') used by its proponents and supporters in place of the generally accepted worldwide devil's horns symbol, which they viewed as unacceptable. This one finger sign involves partakers touching each other's extended forefingers tip-to-tip. Not just limited to grindcore, bands of the One Finger Movement also include Purgatory and Tengkorak.

== See also ==
- Indonesian heavy metal
- Indonesian rock
