= Indonesian heavy metal =

Music scene

- Other names: Indonesian metal
- Stylistic origins: Heavy metal; Thrash metal; Death metal; Black metal; Gothic metal; Progressive metal; Speed metal; Power metal; Pop metal; Glam metal; Nu metal; Alternative metal; Metalcore
- Cultural origins: 1980s
- Typical instruments: Electric guitar; Vocals; Bass; Drums; Keyboards (occasionally)

Subgenres
- Indonesian death metal

Other topics
- Music of Indonesia; Indonesian rock

Indonesian heavy metal or Indonesian metal music are music with the heavy metal genre that developed and emerged from local Indonesian metal bands. In history, the rise of metal music in Indonesia was influenced by the popularity of Indonesian rock music. Several sub-genres of heavy metal in Indonesia are also quite popular, such as thrash metal, death metal, power metal, progressive metal, black metal, and gothic metal which are often performed by local metal bands in Indonesia.

== History ==
=== 1970s–1980s ===
The embryo of the birth of the underground rock music scene in Indonesia is difficult to separate from the evolution of the pioneer rockers of the 70s era like their predecessors. For example, God Bless, Gank Pegangsaan, Gypsy (Jakarta), Giant Step, Super Kid (Bandung), Terncem (Solo), AKA/SAS (Surabaya), Bentoel (Malang) to Rawe Rontek from Banten. They are the first generation of Indonesian rockers. The term underground itself has actually been used by Aktuil Magazine since the early 70s. This term was used by a pioneering music and lifestyle magazine from Bandung to refer to bands that played loud music.

Towards the end of the 80s, all over the world, young people were facing this time thrash metal music fever. A growth in a more extreme style of metal music compared to heavy metal. Bands who became his gods include Slayer, Metallica, Exodus, Megadeth, Kreator, Sodom, Anthrax to Sepultura. During this period, local bands began to emerge that performed thrash metal, power metal and speed metal music such as Roxx (1981), Power Metal (1986), Rudal (1987), Sucker Head (1989), and Mortus (1989). The emergence of these bands can be said to be the first generation of metal bands in the Indonesian heavy metal scene.

The majority of big cities in Indonesia like Jakarta, Bandung, Yogyakarta, Surabaya, Malang to Bali, the underground scene was first born from this extreme music genre. It was in Jakarta itself that the metal community started appeared in public in early 1988.

=== 1990s ===
Entering the 90s era, thrash metal was still the dominant heavy metal genre in the Indonesian metal music scene. In this era, several famous thrash metal bands emerged, such as Rotor (1991) and Betrayer (1992). Which these thrash metal bands awakened the surge of metal music in Indonesia. What was previously mostly just underground became a band that was received attention from major labels. Moreover, the two thrash metal bands in their songs raise broad themes such as the harshness of life, politics, death, civil rights, and even religious values. The arrangements produced by the two bands are also very catchy even though they are still in the thrash metal corridor which has loud and fast melodies.

The decade of the 90s was also the era of the first major movement of the death metal genre in Indonesia, originating from the emergence of an initiative by the death metal music group from Malang, Rotten Corpse, which produced for the first time (which is known) death metal music. The emergence of Rotten Corpse in this genre is a sign of the birth of a new musical individual, and started the death metal scene in Indonesia.

Several other death metal pioneer music groups in other areas, such as Grausig, and Trauma from Jakarta; Insanity and Hallucination from Bandung, Death Vomit from Yogyakarta; Slow Death from Surabaya then developed with musical groups that were considered senior because of their respective experiences, such as: Disinfected, Ancur, Plasmoptysis, Hydro, Body from Bandung; Siksakubur, Funeral Inception, Disgrace from Jakarta; Cranial Incisored from Yogyakarta; Grind Buto from Semarang; Total Rusak from Bukittinggi; Jahanam Corpse from Batam; DeathSounD from Pontianak; Teboks from Sambas; Chain 86 from Tegal; Genocide the Kraken from Cirebon; Tiempeng from Melawi; Gilling from Kampong Arang.

The decade of the 90s was also the time when Indonesia's leading and popular death metal bands were founded, including Jasad (1990) and Purgatory (1994). These both death metal bands still have wide popularity today in Indonesian death metal scene.

Apart from thrash metal and death metal, in this era progressive metal bands also emerged which became metal music legends in Indonesia. Especially after being introduced by progressive metal bands such as Burgerkill (1995), a band from Bandung that brought progressive metal and groove metal which added color to the Indonesian heavy metal music scene. Burgerkill's influence is also quite dominant, especially as the band also has a strong fans base. There was a surge in Burgerkill influence until the 2000s era and even until now.

=== 2000s ===
Entering the 2000s, the innovation and creativity of the heavy metal scene was still quite strong and massive. Indonesian metal bands that were founded in the 90s are still producing their works, especially albums.

Bands from their respective sub genres such as Betrayer from thrashmetal are still active in releasing albums such as Death Penalty (2000), Betrayer (2002), 04 (2004), The Best of Betrayer (2005), Revolution (2007). However, in 2001, Betrayer frontman, Ndaru Widodo founded another band called Thrashline, this band still uses thrash metal as its main genre.

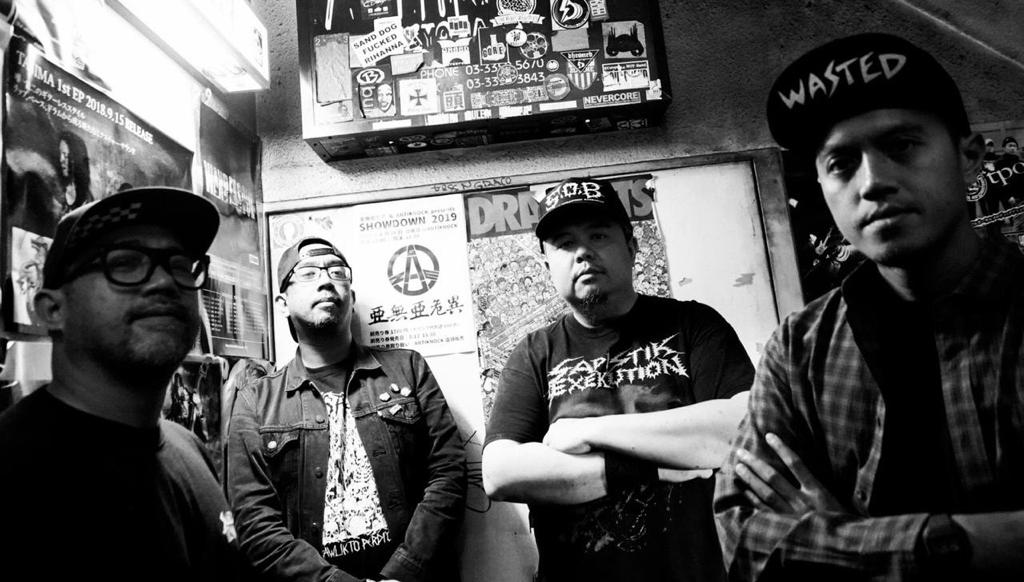
Seringai, 2000s Indonesian metal band

Metal bands with new and unique concepts also began to emerge in the early 2000s. Like Seringai, stoner metal which was founded in 2002. Seringai started his career by releasing a mini album, entitled High Octane Rock, released in 2004. Seringai released his first album, entitled Wolves Militia, released in 2007. The music played by Seringai It is well known to its fans as hard music that is synonymous with music outside the mainstream or underground. However, Seringai actually had a phase where they felt that they didn't always want to be a metal band. Seringai was said to have thought about bringing post-hardcore nuanced music.

== See also ==
- Death metal in Indonesia
- Indonesian rock
