= Rock In Solo =

Music festival held in Surakarta, Indonesia

- Genre: Heavy metal, punk rock
- Dates: May–December
- Locations: Surakarta, Indonesia
- Years active: 2004–present
- Website: www.rockinsolo.com

Rock In Solo is a rock music festival held in Surakarta, Indonesia. By 2012, the event had become a major music festival in Indonesia, with 8,000 visitors.

The festival was first held in 2004 as a small music event with one stage and seven bands. The second edition was launched in 2007 and the third in 2009. The 2009 edition is also the first edition to feature international band. Since 2009 the festival had been held annually until 2015. In 2010 Rock In Solo took place with around 20 bands performing on 2 stages. On the 2011 edition, the festival facilitated 33 bands with 4 stages.

The attendance of Rock In Solo has grown and the festival has attracted around 8,000 people in 2012 compared to 1,500 in 2004 on its first incarnation. The 2013 edition was attended by 10.000 people in two days event.

Notable bands that have performed in Rock In Solo include Death Angel, Kataklysm, Cannibal Corpse, Dying Fetus, Behemoth, Carcass and Nile

After the 2015 edition, the festival experienced a hiatus during 2016-2021, but reactivated in 2022.

== Lineups ==
=== 2004 ===
Held on Friday, May 28, 2004 at Manahan Sport Center, Surakarta

Lineup
Tengkorak; The Brandals; Seringai; Down For Life	Sporadic Bliss; Automatic; Russian Roulette

=== 2007 ===
Held on Saturday, August 25, 2007 at Manahan Velodrome, Surakarta

Lineup
Burgerkill; Seringai; Down For Life; Bandoso	Makam; End Of Summer; Faceless; Translantic Lab Feat Belukar

=== 2009 ===
Held on Saturday, October 31, 2009 at Manahan Sport Center, Surakarta

Lineup
Psycroptic; Burgerkill; Down For Life; Death Vomit; Bandoso	Nemesis; Outright; Makam; Spirit Of Life; Faceless

=== 2010 ===
Held on Friday, September 17, 2010 at Sriwedari Stadium, Surakarta

Lineup
Dying Fetus; Siksakubur; Down For Life; Fall Of Mirra; Komunal; Valerian; Cranial Incisored	Bandoso; Spirit Of Life; Devoured; Opium; Take and Awake; Matius III:II; From This Day	Pernicious Hate; Tragical Memories; Never Again; Breathing on Flame; Sisi Selatan; Beneath The Burning Sky; Bankeray

=== 2011 ===
Held on Saturday, September 17, 2011 at Alun – Alun Utara, Surakarta

Lineup
Death Angel; Kataklysm; Deranged; Enforce; Oathean; Ishtar; Burgerkill; Down For Life; Rajasinga; Gigantor	Bandoso; Suri; Extreme Decay; Turbidity; Something Wrong; Madonna Of The Rock; Alice; Crucial Conflict; Too Late To Notice; Fat In Diet	Noseferatu; Octopus; Pesakitan; Lost Another; End Of Your Life; Screaming School; Lamphor; Spirit Of Life; Matius III:II; Anti Regime	Never Again; Enforced; Bankeray; Sisi Selatan; Bhrobosan; Death Stumble; Black Hot Company; Tangan Nggratil; Defragment Otak; Blood Diamond

=== 2012 ===
Held on Saturday, October 13, 2012 at Alun – Alun Utara, Surakarta

Lineup
Cannibal Corpse; Jasad; Jeruji; Dead Vertical; Bandoso; Parau; Belligerent Intent; Nafrat; Speedkill; Aftercoma	Spirit Of Life; Revenge; Dreamer; Killharmonic; Devadata; Makam; Anorma; Nothing Special; Tendangan Badut; Never Again	Metallic Ass; Soulsaver; Werewolf; Hydroshephalus; Unremains; Tiyank Ndusun; Trah Gali Soulja; Sunday Sad Story; Devormity; Starting Over	Problem Overstay; Undergreed; Salahudin Al Ayubi; Fearless; Bhrobosan; Hands Of Midas; Incarnation

=== 2013 ===
Held on Saturday, November 2 & Sunday, November 3, 2013 at Kota Barat Ground, Surakarta. Future president Joko Widodo was in attendance.

Lineup
Behemoth; Hour of Penance; Noxa; Down For Life ((Auman)); Navicula	Psychonaut; Ilemauzar; Straightout; Outright; The Corals; Kapital	Djin; Bankeray; Nadi; Inlander; Kedjawen; KM09	Sisi Selatan; Deadly Weapon; Jihad; Djiwo; Infectious Arteries; The Working Class Symphony

=== 2014 ===
Held on Saturday, October 11, 2014 at Benteng Vastenburg, Surakarta.

Lineup
Carcass; EdanE; Death Vomit; Siksakubur; Down For Life	Bandoso; Revenge; Godless Symptoms; Revenge The Fate; Disinfected	Warkvlt; Piston; Rising The Fall; Fraud; Earth Rot	Salahudin Al Ayubi; Biang Kerock

=== 2015 ===
Rock In Solo 2015 was held on Monday, November 15, 2015 at Manahan Stadium Parking Park, Surakarta.

Lineup
Nile; Unearth; I Killed The Prom Queen; Burgerkill	Seringai; Carnivored; Rezume; Serigala Malam	Gendar Pecel; Pargochy; Immortal Rites; Bankeray	Internal Amputation; Furor; Anthelion

=== 2022 ===
The main event of Rock in Solo Festival 2022 was held on October 30, 2022 at Fort Vastenburg, Surakarta. This is the first edition of the festival in 7 years since the last edition in 2015.

Lineup
Suffocation; Fit for an Autopsy; Down for Life; Navicula	Roxx; Fraud; Beside; Serigala Malam	Extreme Decay; Pure Wrath; Paranoid Despire; MTAD	MCPR; Iron Voltage; Sworn

Rock in Solo Festival 2022 also featured series of pre-event shows prior to the main event. The pre-event shows called A Journey of Rock in Solo and The Rock Parade took place at multiple venues in Surakarta and its built-up areas from September 18, 2022 to October 26, 2022. A total of 36 bands played for the series of pre-event shows including Metallic Ass, Bandoso, The Working Class Symphony, Wafat, Sisi Selatan, Tendangan Badut, Spirit of Life, Sunday Sad Story and Gendar Pecel.

=== 2023 ===
Rock In Solo 2023 was held on Sunday, December 10, 2023 at Fort Vastenburg, Surakarta.

Lineup
Behemoth; Thy Art is Murder; Cryptopsy; Edane; Down for Life; Noxa	Humiliation; Death Vomit; Sworn; Kid Monster; Ludicia	MCPR; Weekend Warrior; Dazzle; MTAD	Finsmoonth; XTAB; Fingerprint
