= Siksakubur =

- Origin: Jakarta, Indonesia
- Genres: Death metal
- Years active: 1996–present
- Labels: Extreme Soul; Rottrevore; Fast Youth Records; Armstretch Records; Podium Music
- Members: Andre Marora Tiranda; Adhytia Perkasa; Ricky Rangga; Septian Maulana
- Past members: (See below)
- Website: Siksakubur Official on Facebook

Siksakubur (English: Torture at the Grave) is an Indonesian brutal/death metal band from Jakarta, formed in July 6, 1996 by Andyan Gorust and Ade Godel. The name of Siksakubur was chosen by Gorust that inspired by Brazilian metal band Sepultura meaning 'grave' in Portuguese as benchmark of their musicality. None of the band founders are listed as band members today, but the legacy of Siksakubur was continued by Andre Tiranda. Siksakubur is a band whose career crept from the grave and began with small concerts and events until international scale events has been through. With consistency and discipline, a journey of more than 2 decades has made Siksakubur equal with the top metal bands and as one of the influential death metal bands in the Indonesian metal scene. Siksakubur was also listed as Metal Hammer's "Top 10 Best Indonesian Metal Bands" and awarded The Hammersonic Awards as "Breakthrough of the Year" at The Hammersonic Festival on May 7, 2017.

== History ==
Siksakubur began when Gorust got together with his schoolmates who had the same musical interest to see metal bands rehearsing in a music studio near their school in the 1990s. Among these metal bands that are still around today are Purgatory, Tengkorak and Betrayer. The 1996's inaugural line-up consisted of Gorust (Drum), Godel (Vocal/Guitar), Has (Bass), Bembenx (Guitar) and Rosadist (Guitar). This formation only lasted until November 1997 since Has (Bassist) left the band then the band's hiatus between December 1997 and July 1998. Angga Burgenk joined the band as new Bass player In July 1998, but shortly after Burgenk became a member, Bembenx decided to quit the band the same year, followed by Rosadist a few months later, leaving the band with no Guitarists by end of 1998 and no album released during this period. Nowadays more than 2 decades of their long journey, Siksakubur has become one of the supergroups in Indonesian underground metal music scene and the most productive metal band for album releases. The name of Siksakubur was chosen after the band previously used another name which coincidentally was the same as the existing bands at that time.

=== Early formation and The Carnage (1999–2001) ===
In 1999, Siksakubur faced difficult situation as they had no guitarist left until they decided that Godel taken over of guitar position and Prahari "Japs" Mahardika as Vocalist. The 1999's formation became Gorust (Drum), Godel (Guitar), Burgenk (Bass) and Japs (Vocal). This formation was ready for recording process and was considered as the beginning of the band's journey at that time. All members of this formation was also considered as founders of the band. The band started to enter the studio in July 21, 2000 to record 5 songs then record another 4 songs in early September 2000 to complete the debut. This debut finally release in 2001 under the label of Extreme Soul Production based in Bandung that received positive responses from metalheads in underground community and Indonesian music enthusiasts.
All songs of this album was composed by Gorust, mixing and mastering was engineered by Wanda, produced by Iwan "D". The band's artwork logo was designed by Japs, album artwork layout by Ditto and designed by One-tmo. The Carnage was remastered and reissued in 2001 and July 7, 2018 (for limited number of copies) through the same label.

=== Back to Vengeance (2002) ===
A year after the debut, Siksakubur released second album titled Back to Vengeance under the label of Rottrevore Records in 2002. They also began to expand their stage performance through major events where mostly held in the islands of Java to Bali, Kalimantan, Sulawesi and other cities throughout the country. The band was also invited to play at the school art performances where it was very rare for extreme metal music to appear at school stages by that time.
The album composed of 11 songs and reissued in 2018 through Zim Zum Entertainment an independent underground label based in Jakarta. Working process of this album was recorded by end of 2001, mixing process engineered by Yuda and mastering by Adi and Gorust.

=== Godel departure (2002) ===
However, shortly after the release of their second album, Guitarist and one of the founders of the band, Godel decided to leave the band to manage his business outside the group then later replaced by Andre "Bacot" Tiranda (Revitol) (also known as Bacot) as guitarist. During this period Bimorbid (Absolute Defiance) also joined the band to complete the line-up as secondary guitarist. But this formation only holds a few months after Bimorbid left the band then followed by Burgenk for study reasons. Then Yuli "Bebek" Wahyudianto (also known as Yudi Bebek) joined the band to complete the formation, the line-up became Gorust (Drum), Andre (Guitar), Yudi Bebek (Bass) and Japs (Vocal).

=== Eye Cry (2003–2006) ===
The Eye Cry released under the same label with the previous album by Rottrevore Records in 2003. This third album composed of 10 songs, collaborated with RinsDark (Gelap) and Sapta "Moel" Mulya (Eternal Madness) that received high appreciation from Indonesian music enthusiasts and has positive response specially songs of "Pasukan Jiwa Terbelakang" ("Squad of Retarded Soul"), "Renounce Me" and "Destitusi Menuju Mati" ("Destitution Towards Mortality") that successfully penetrated through National mainstream media. During this period, the double album of The Carnage and Back to Vengeance was released through From Beyond Records based in Netherlands for distribution in Europe and United States markets. The album was produced by Dwinanda Satrio (known as "Rio" or "Rio Rottrevore"), mixing engineered by Yuda, artwork layout by Andre and designed by Yopi Kucing, Siksakubur had an opportunity to be the headliner of Singapore's "IJ Metal Fest 3" in July 2, 2005. This album has been reissued 2 times in 2013 and April 2015 through Off The Records an independent underground sub-label of Bravo Musik. Unlike the previous 2 albums The Carnage and Back to Vengeance, the poor quality of sound recording due to recording facilities and technology in extreme metal scene are not sophisticated as today. This is acceptable by that time and became the hallmark of local death metal albums in 2000s era, adding to the brutality of the sound which was full of blast-beats and low-tuned guitars. Eye Cry is almost completely filled with clear sounds where various instrumentations can be heard clearly that Siksakubur succeeded in bringing great energy through complex arrangements. However it is not merely the complexity that the band wants to achieve, but becomes a pathway for chord progression and execution of highly skilled instruments that taking the quality of death metal arrangement and musicality to the new level.

=== Podium (2007) ===
The fourth album of Siksakubur titled Podium was released in August 2007, continued to album promotion tours including mini tour of Java-Bali road show titled "Agenda Bencana Tour 2008" and got an opportunity to be the headliner of "Gegey Fest" in Kuala Lumpur. The album composed of 10 songs including Pantera cover song of "F*cking Hostile" as bonus track. This album was reissued 2 times in April 2008 through Alfa Records and April 2015 through Off The Records. Unlike the band's previous albums, all the songs composed in Indonesian, except Pantera cover song. The album produced by Rio, artwork was designed by Yopi Kucing, layout by Andre and concept by Japs.

=== Gorust departure (2007–2008) ===
Podium was the final and farewell album of the founder, conceptor and leader of Siksakubur, Andyan Gorust that finally decided to leave the band shortly after Podium was finished the recording sessions, leaving Japs as the remaining original member of the band to continue the journey with Andre and the rest members of the band (later Gorust joined Deadsquad and formed Hellcrust). Siksakubur auditioned for drummer and Prama "Jangexz" Pramurdito (Alexander/Last Suffer) were selected to replace Gorust. During this period, Yudi Bebek followed Gorust quit the band due to other activities outside the group then his position replaced by Rodewin "Ewien" Naiborhu (Bloody Gore/Grausig). By end of 2007 the formation became Andre (Guitar), Jagenxz (Drum), Japs (Vocal) and Ewien (Bass).

=== Tentara Merah Darah (2009–2010) ===
The work of Tentara Merah Darah took approximately a year until recording process by end 2009 then released in February 22, 2010 through the label of Fast Youth Records. This fifth album composed of 11 songs that collaborated with Rinsdark, Moel and Rifki Bachtiar as guest vocalist on several tracks of the album. This album introduced a new theme post Gorust era with different structure of musicality performed by Jagenxz that expected to be able to keep up with other band members. All the songs on this album are one whole story inspired by story-line visualization of 300 movie or history of Battle of Thermopylae about its epic patriotism. The album was produced by Amri Putrajaya (Invictus), recorded in Avra Studio, Jakarta engineered by Chief Herman, mixing and mastering process engineered by Moel at Herzklang Lab, Bali and album artwork layout was designed by Riandy "blossomdec4y" Karuniawan. This album was reissued in 2015 through Armstretch Records.
Shortly after the completion of this album, to strengthen the band's musicality, Andre wanted to add secondary Guitarist after being sole Guitarist since 2002, then Nyoman "Bije" Saputra Wardana (Funeral Inception) joined with the same vision and musical passion with the band by end of 2009. So the formation became Andre (Guitar), Jangexz (Drum), Ewien (Bass), Japs (Vocal) and Bije (Guitar), then later the band performed Java-Bali tour to promote the album titled "Tentara Merah Darah 2010" and it was the most successful tour of the band's career. The promotion tour continued to neighboring country where Siksakubur had an opportunity to visit 4 cities of Penang, Perak, Kuala Lumpur and Johor Bahru in Malaysia.

=== Japs departure and Andre era (2011) ===
A few months after the release of Tentara Merah Darah, the last original member, Japs decided to leave the band around November 2010 that made this album his last and farewell album. Japs resignation eventually made the legacy of the band continued by Andre. Then shortly Septian "Asep" Maulana (Distrust) joined the formation to replace Japs. Three weeks later, Siksakubur held a mini tour to 6 cities in Java titled "High Across Java Tour 2010" to introduce the new formation with Asep. But this new formation did not last long, because shortly after tours in early 2011, Jagenxz was also decided to quit the band followed by Bije couple of months later. Then Adhytia Perkasa (Funeral Inception) joined the formation to replace Jagenxz as a new Drummer and later on Baken Nainggolan (Betrayer) joined to replace Bije completing the formation as new Guitarist. The Band's formation of 2011 became Andre (Guitar), Baken (Guitar), Ewien (Bass), Adhytia (Drum) and Asep (Vocal). But this formation did not last long either. Prior the work for the next album St. Kristo, Ewien decided to leave the band, then Arinanda Gilang Pratama (known as Ananda) joined the band to replace Ewien shortly after the album was completed.

=== St. Kristo (2012–2013) ===
St. Kristo was released on May 18, 2012 followed by album launching event the following month on June 30, 2012 at Kemang, Jakarta. This event was enlivened by the leading metal bands, among these bands are Noxa, Gelgamesh and 'Corporation of Bleeding' as the opening act before Siksakubur appeared at the end of the event for closing ceremony. The work for this sixth album was done without Bass player due to Ewien's resignation in the previous year. All Bass recording session was done by Andre. The album composed of 7 songs, was produced by Rudi Dian through the label of Podium Music, collaborated with many musicians as guest vocals in the compositions of the album, among of them are Mohamad Rohman (known as Man) (Jasad) and former vocalist Japs as an additional vocal, backing for Asep on the last song of the album. Mixing and mastering process was engineered by Sonny and Andre, the album's artwork still designed by blossomdec4y. Soon after the album was released, another change of band members occurred again with the departure of Asep, then his position taken over by Rudy Harjianto as the band's new Vocalist. Siksakubur began promoting the album through domestic stage performances until they had an opportunity returned to neighboring country visiting 6 cities throughout Malaysia. During this period, the formation also did not last long where several months later, Ananda quit the band then later replaced by Dena Rendisah Prabandara as the new Bassist to complete the line up. The new formation became Andre (Guitar), Baken (Guitar), Adhytia (Drum), Rudy (Vocal) and Dena (Bass).

This album was dedicated to a friend, partner, brother, metal scenester and owner of Rottrevore Records label named Kristoforus Dwinanda Satrio (known as Rio or Rio Rottrevore) who died on November 28, 2011. The name of the album was taken from his first name to commemorate the dedications and brilliant ideas to Indonesian metal music scene.

=== Siksakubur (2014–2015) ===
This seventh album was released on April 27, 2014 titled Siksakubur, coincide with the event of 2014 Hammersonic Festival where Siksakubur as one of the headliners, which considered as great moment and opportunity to introduce the new album during the event. The pre-launch event was held earlier in April 18, 2014 at a cafe around Pulo Gadung, eastern Jakarta. Siksakubur invited Disinfected, Rajasinga, Dreamer, Tyranny, Lucretia and Abgotter to participate in enlivening the event. The band was scheduled to hold a tour of several cities in the following month. The album was about self reflections as the reason that there was no album artwork for this self-titled album or "VII" as an alternate title, just photograph of the band members. The album consists of 11 compositions including "Choose Your Death", a cover song of Necrodeath as closing track, produced by Baken and Andre, mixing and mastering process engineered by Sonny. Siksakubur featured MC Morgue Vanguard (known as Ucok Homicide) to fill rap vocal on "Honay". This album was released under Podium Music, an independent owned label of Siksakubur.

=== Baken departure (2015) ===
"...Every personnel change of band members made my position better and personnel change is not a change but an adventure..." [sic]

— Andre Tiranda, Frontman and guitarist.

The change of musicians in the band occurred again with Baken's departure in July 27, 2015, shortly after the band's stage performance around June 2015 at Losari Beach, Makassar, which was his last stage performance with the band. The information was announced on Siksakubur's Official Facebook Page that Baken Nainggolan is no longer member of Siksakubur. Main reason was due to indisciplinary issue, but Baken felt that he has been removed from the Band due to no transparency and openness in the band's internal management and there was no longer a sense of kinship in the band. During this period the formation of the band changed again with Dena departure, until Ricky Rangga (Damnation) joined to replace Baken and Gilang Dwi Pristianto (Nithael) to replace Dena, then the formation became Andre (Guitar), Adhytia (Drum), Rudy (Vocal), Ricky (Guitar) and Gilang (Bass).

=== Mazmur:187 (2016–present) ===
The iconic eighth album of Siksakubur was released on November 2, 2016 titled Mazmur:187 through the label Armstretch Records. Produced by Rudi Dian with Santo Gunawan as an executive producer, mixing and recording engineered by Endro Wibowo, mastering by Edi Hazt and artwork was designed by Adi Christianize. The album title 'Mazmur' meaning psalms or hymns of praise, while 187 is an international code for murder or crime of murder then generally interpreted as hymns for murderer. This album consists of 10 compositions that took around a year in creative works started from building guitar riffs, reformed, selections and composition arrangements until recording process. Soon after album release, Siksakubur hold a series of tours initially to Kalimantan titled "West Borneo Tour" then continued the tours to the islands of Java, Bali and Lombok the following year with titled "Mazmur:187 Tour 2017".

== Additional notes ==
Guitarist Andre Tiranda was interviewed by Sam Dunn in his documentary Global Metal.

== Band members ==
=== Current line-up ===
- Andre Marora Tiranda – Guitars, backing vocals (2002–present)
- Adhytia Perkasa – Drums (2011–present)
- Ricky Rangga – Guitars (2016–present)
- Septian Maulana (2011–2012, 2021-present)

=== Additional musicians ===
- Ewin Mangitua – Bass (2022–present)

=== Past members ===
Guitar:

- Rosadist (1996–1998)
- Bembenx (1996–1998)
- Ade Godel (1996–2002)
- Nyoman Saputra Wardana (2009–2011)
- Baken Nainggolan (2011–2015)

Bass:

- Has (1996–1997)
- Burgenk (1997–2002)
- Yuli Wahyudianto (2002–2007)
- Rodewin Naiborhu (2007–2011)
- Arinanda Gilang Pratama (2011–2013)
- Dena R Prabandara (2013–2015)
- Gilang Pristianto – Bass (2016–2022)

Drums:

- Andyan Gorust (1996–2007)
- Prama "Jangexz" Pramurdito (2007–2011)

Vocals:

- Prahari Mahardika (1996–2011)
- Rudy Harjianto (2012–2021)

== Discography ==
- The Carnage (2001)
- Back to Vengeance (2002)
- Eye Cry (2003)
- Podium (2007)
- Tentara Merah Darah (2010)
- St.Kristo (2012)
- Siksakubur (2014)
- Mazmur:187 (2016)

== Awards ==
Year	Award	Category	Nominee(s)	Result	Ref.
2017	Hammersonic Awards	Breakthrough of The Year	"Siksakubur"	Won	
2010	Indonesia Cutting Edge Music Awards	Favorite Metal Song	"Memoar Sang Pengobar"	Nominated	
