= Down for Life =

Down for Life may refer to:

- Down for Life (film), a 2009 American dramatic film
- Down for Life (band) an Indonesian metal band
- Down for Life (album) by D4L
- "Down for Life", a song by DJ Khaled from his album Grateful

== See also ==
- D4L, an American band
