= Down for Life (band) =

Indonesian metal band

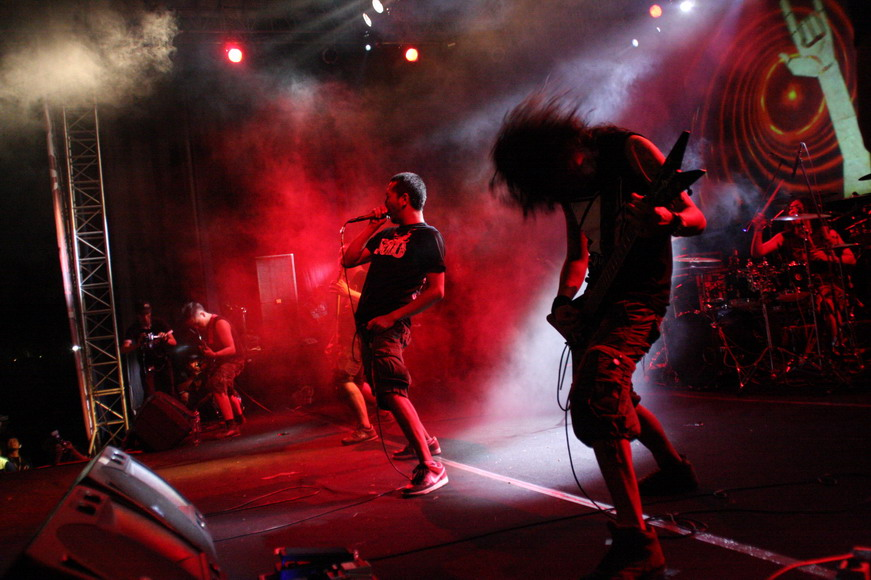
- Down for Life in 2010 at the Rock in Solo festival

Background information
- Origin: Surakarta, Indonesia
- Genres: Metalcore; hardcore; thrash metal; groove metal
- Years active: 1999–present
- Labels: Belukar Records; Sepsis Records; Blackandje Records
- Members: Stephanus Adjie; Ahmad "Jojo" Ashar; Rio Baskara; Isa Mahendrajati; M. Abdoel Latief; Mattheus Aditirtono; Adria Sarvianto
- Past members: Anang "Achenk" Ahmadi; Doddy Mortorg; Imam Santoso; Sigit Pratama; Wahyu "Uziel" Jayadi; Moses Rizky

Down for Life is an Indonesian metal band. The band was formed in Surakarta, Central Java, in 1999 by vocalist Stephanus Adjie, after his departure from his previous band, Sabotage.

The band's name was taken from the writing on the Achenk's tape of Biohazard's album No Holds Barred, which is scheduled to be sold to Imam's younger brother, Sigit Pratama.

== History ==
=== Formation and debut album ===
The first members of the band included vocalist Stephanus Adjie, bassist Ahmad "Jojo" Ashari, drummer Anang "Achenk" Ahmadi, and guitarist Imam Santoso. Their first show took place in early 2000 for a street punk gigs in Semarang, Indonesia. The first line-up change occurred when drummer Achenk left the band and was replaced by Doddy. The addition of guitarist also occurred with the joining of Imam's brother, Sigit Pratama. Throughout its career, the band had several line up changes since its inception with Adjie and Jojo being the two original members left today.

It took nearly 8 years for the band to release their debut album, Simponi Kebisingan Babi Neraka. The album was preceded by the departure of drummer Doddy and the arrival of his replacement, Wahyu "Uziel" Jayadi. Released in 2008 through Belukar Records, the album quickly gained attention from the fans due to the fact that the band frequently played several songs on the album years before its release.

=== Line-up changes and second album ===
The sibling guitarists Imam Santoso and Sigit Pratama left the band in 2010, leaving the band with no option but to find the replacements. The band held an audition and finally recruited two guitarists, Rio Baskara and Moses Rizky. In August 2011, they entered the studio to begin recording of the second album Himne Perang Akhir Pekan. After two years of recording and finding suitable record label, the album was released in September 2013 through Sepsis Records, preceded by the single "Prosa Kesetaraan".

By the time the album was released in September 2013, the band performed in Rock in Solo festival. Previously, they also had played in other Indonesian metal festivals including Bandung Berisik in 2011, and Hammersonic Metalfest in 2013.

== Band members ==
Current members

- Stephanus Adjie – vocals (1999–present)
- Ahmad "Jojo" Ashar – bass guitar, backing vocals (1999–present)
- Rio Baskara – guitar (2010–present)
- Isa Mahendrajati – guitar (2013–present)
- Muhammad "Abdul" Latief – drums (2014–present)
- Mattheus Aditirtono – bass (2019–present)
- Adria Sarvianto – sequencer, backing vocals (2022–present)

Former members

- Anang "Achenk" Ahmadi – drums (1999–2000), guitars (2000–2001)
- Doddy Mortorg – drums (2000–2006)
- Imam Santoso – guitar (1999–2010)
- Sigit Pratama – guitar (2004–2010)
- Wahyu "Uziel" Jayadi – drums (2006–2014)
- Moses Rizky – guitar (2010–2013)

Timeline

== Discography ==
=== Studio albums ===
Title	Album details
Simponi Kebisingan Babi Neraka	Released: June 2007; Label: Belukar Records; Format: CD
Himne Perang Akhir Pekan	Released: September 2013; Label: Sepsis Records/ demajors Records; Format: CD
Menantang Langit	Released: September 2017; Label: demajors Records; Format: vinyl

=== Singles ===
Title	Single Details
"Change"	Released: 2006; Album: Simponi Kebisingan Babi Neraka; Label: Belukar Records
"Menuju Matahari"	Released: 2007; Album: Simponi Kebisingan Babi Neraka; Label: Belukar Records
"Pasukan Babi Neraka"	Released: 2012; Album: Himne Perang Akhir Pekan; Label: Sepsis Records/ demajors Records
"Prosa Kesetaraan"	Released: 2013; Album: Himne Perang Akhir Pekan; Label: Sepsis Records/ demajors Records
"Pesta Partai Barbar"	Released: 2014; Album: Himne Perang Akhir Pekan; Label: Sepsis Records/ demajors Records
"Liturgi Penyesatan" (acoustic version)	Released: 2017; Album: Menantang Langit; Label: demajors Records
"Mantra Bentala"	Released: 2020; Album: coming soon; Label: Blackandje Records
"Apokaliptika"	Released: 2021; Album: coming soon; Label: Blackandje Records
"Children of Eden"	Released: 2022; Album: coming soon
