= Hellcrust =

- Origin: Jakarta, Indonesia
- Genres: Death metal; thrash metal
- Years active: 2011–present
- Label: Armstretch Records
- Members: Andyan Gorust; Nyoman "Bije" Saputra; Dirk "Derik" Marthin; Donirro Hayashi
- Past members: Prahari "Japra" Mahardika; Baken Nainggolan; "Wiro" Wirsky; Ario Nugroho; Bonny Sidharta; Septian "Asep" Maulana; Arslan "Alan" Musyfia
- Website: Hellcrust Official on Instagram

Hellcrust is an Indonesian death metal band from Jakarta, formed in September 24, 2011 by Bije, Wiro and Andyan Gorust. The band has released three albums, including one mini-album and single, all released under the label of Armstretch Records. Almost all of the members have been part of the iconic band Siksakubur, even though they are from different generations. Hellcrust's fanbase of metal music enthusiasts is known as "Balamaut". Nowadays, Hellcrust is one of the most influential bands in Indonesia.

== History ==
The band was started through an event of Misery Index played in Jakarta in early March 2011. Wiro (Death Valley) and Bije (Straightout) were inspired to form a band that had a similar genre. They invited Andyan Nasary Suryadi, known as Andyan Gorust (DeadSquad), to join a new project band with a commitment to making songs and records directly. Gorust selected his bandmate Bonny (DeadSquad) and Ario (Carnivored) to complete the line-up through an audition, so the Hellcrust inaugural formation went straight to the recording process. Hellcrust's unique musicality is tied to each member's potential and improvisations to express themselves in songmaking. Hellcrust's logo was designed and created by M. Asrul from Makassar, Indonesia as the winner of Hellcrust's logo making contest.

=== Early formation and EP debut (2012–2013) ===
The initial formation of Hellcrust at their debut EP release consisted of Bije (guitar), Gorust (drums), Ario (guitar), Bonny (bass) and Wiro (vocals). Dosa was released on June 12, 2012, about eight months after the band was formed. It was composed of five songs (all in Indonesian): "Agresi Semu", "Budak Kehidupan", "Doktrinisasi Karat", "Jerat Ilusi", and "Hitam Dunia". It was recorded at BeeSound Studio and the mixing process was engineered by Joseph Manurung at Blessing Studio, both in Jakarta, and took nine days since early April 2012. The album artwork was designed by Mark Cooper, a designer from Mindrape Art based in Florida, United States.

=== Bonny's, Ario's and Wiro's departure (2013–2015) ===
The substitution of band members was unavoidable, as both Gorust and Bonny were actively involved in DeadSquad by that time. Gorust was also as one of the initiators of the band with Bonny and Stevie Item since 2006. The band members' turnover was started when Bonny left the band around 2013, and was replaced by Alan, a session player for Carnivored and briefly for Funeral Inception until being recruited as replacement bassist for Bonny in DeadSquad. then became permanent member in Hellcrust since 2014. Ario followed Bonny, leaving the Band two years later, around 2015. He was followed by Wiro who left the band the same year. Eventually Bije and Gorust were reunited with their bandmates Baken and Japra (also known as "Japs"), both former members of Siksakubur, to complete the line-up.

=== Kalamaut (2016–2018) ===
Kalamaut was released on January 16, 2016, with an album launch in Kemang, Jakarta on February 20, 2016. Attended by fellow musicians, news reporters, and "Balamaut", a metalhead community loyal to the band.

The album has a theme of social criticism. It won "Album of The Year" at the Hammersonic Metal Awards 2016, at the Southeast Asia Hammersonic Festival.

Kalamaut was reviewed by many Indonesian music portals. Samack from WarningMagz described it as "...a secret weapon for good music is writing quality lyrics, Kalamaut has succeeded in having these rare classifications as this album is different from their previous debut release, Hellcrust can now advance as one of the sharp and challenging death metal music band...". Kalamaut was listed as WarningMagz's 10 Best Metal Album. Angga from DCDC online music portal described ait s "...this is the dedication of Hellcrust to those who curse, for the sake of their mouths being silenced, they silently struggle to wait for the right time..."

=== "Rimba Khalayak" (single) (2019) ===
"Rimba Khalayak" was released around March 2019.The song is about behavior of social media users and highlights issues of ethnicity, religin, race, sexual exploitation, and the spread of hoaxes in cyberspace. It has a message about how to behave and be wise in social media. "Rimba Khalayak"'s literal meaning is "jungle" or "crowded audiences".

The recording process for this single was started in mid-2018 at Three Sixty Studio, Jakarta. The musicality is sharpened and improved from the previous albums, as it was intended as a pre-release trigger for the band's next album, Sejawat (released in mid-2020). It is a fast song, dense but easy to hear, catchy and anthemic. The single was managed with sole guitar formation after the departure of Baken in the previous year.

=== Sejawat (since 2020) ===
Sejawat is the band's third studio album, and was released on June 27, 2020. "Sejawat" means a depiction of a family that embraces all parties, both are the teams behind the scenes and their fans. This album is dedicated to Balamaut, and included a song titled "Balamaut" among its nine songs.

The recording process of Sejawat began from certain parts of the songs that were recorded independently by Bije and Alan. However, the overall brainstorming recording process had started when they working on "Rimba Khalayak".

This album was produced by Hellcrust in collaboration with Santo Gunawan from Armstretch Records, and distributed via Merch Cons distribution. Sejawat was planned to be released on April 2020, but due to the pandemic, it was finally released by the end of June 2020. The delay also had an impact on Hellcrust's tour plan for the album promotions, for an indefinite period of time, and they instead focused on utilizing streaming media platforms to help promote the album.

=== Japs' departure (2020) ===
Shortly after the completion of the album, Japs quit the band to pursue hisacareer outside music. He was replaced by Asep (Belantara and former vocalist of Siksakubur) in June 2020.

In May 2022, when Hellcrust performed a live show along with Burgerkill and Closehead, a punk band from Bandung, there was a change in the band's formation. Andyan Gorust announced a new formation of the band, in the absence of Asep (vocalist), who was focused on his new band; his position was taken over by Derik. Meanwhile, Alan was replaced by bassist Donirro Hayashi (Vox Mortis), through an earlier open audition.

== Band members ==
Current members

- Andyan Gorust – drums (2011–present)
- Nyoman "Bije" Saputra Wardana – guitar (2011–present)
- Dirk "Derik" Marthin – guitar, lead vocals (2018–present)
- Donirro Hayashi – bass (2022–present)

Former members

- Prahari "Japra" Mahardika – vocals (2013–2020)
- Baken Nainggolan – guitar (2015–2018)
- Ario Nugroho – guitar (2012–2015)
- Bonny Sidharta – bass (2012–2013)
- "Wiro" Wirsky – vocals (2011–2015)
- Septian "Asep" Maulana – vocals (2020–2021)
- Arslan "Alan" Musyfia – bass (2013–2022)

Timeline

== Discography ==
- Dosa (EP) (2012)
- Kalamaut (2016)
- Sejawat (2020)

== Accolades ==
Year	Nominee / work	Award	Result	Ref.
2020	"Rimba Khalayak"	Best Metal Production Works - (AMI) Awards	Nominated	
2017	Hellcrust	Breakthrough of the Year - Hammersonic Awards	Nominated	
2016	Kalamaut	Best Album of the Year - Hammersonic Awards	Won	

== Balamaut ==
"Balamaut" is Hellcrust's fanbase of a metalheads community throughout Indonesia. Balamaut has insignia marked with regional names that unite them at Hellcrust stage performances. Hellcrust dedicated the song "Balamaut" on their third album, Sejawat (released on June 27, 2020), to the community.
