= Indonesian rock =

Indonesian rock music

Indonesian Rock
- Stylistic origins: Rock music; rock and roll; alternative rock; slow rock; soft rock; hard rock; pop rock; glam rock; glam metal; power pop
- Cultural origins: 1950s Indonesia
- Typical instruments: vocal, electric bass, electric guitar, drum, keyboard

Subgenres
- Indorock

Indonesian rock is rock music from Indonesia, a product of the culture and globalizing outlook of the country, similar to this genre's music globally. Indonesian-specific ideas about individualism, interdependency, modernism, and the supernatural have also been observed in the rock videos and music of the nation.

== History ==
=== 1940s - 1960s ===
Rock music began to enter Indonesia around the 1950s during the western rock fever. However, the heyday of rock music in Indonesia was preceded by the band The Rolles (1967) with the genre of jazz rock music. They brought music with different concepts so that they were able to play with the tastes of music lovers at that time. The band was also able to survive and was still popular until the 1980s.

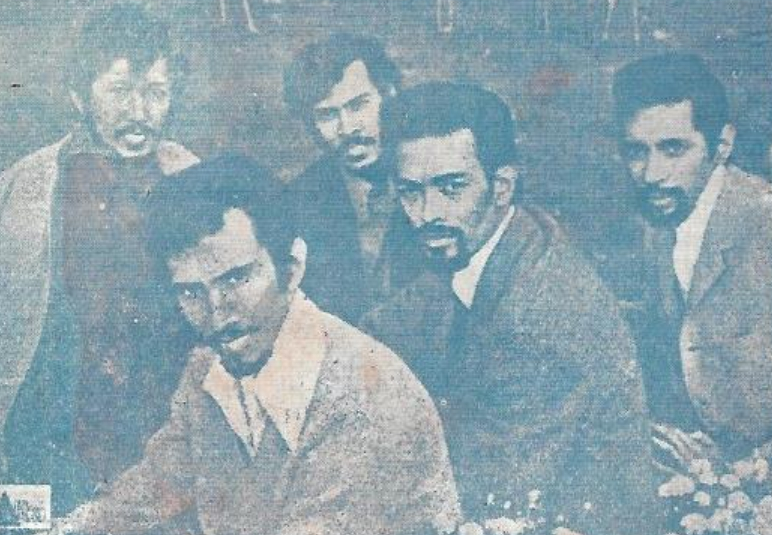
The Tielman Brothers became one of the pioneers of rock and roll music in Indonesia. Because of its wide influence abroad, especially the Netherlands and Germany, this group became the beginning of rock music in Indonesia as a whole.

In that era, Indonesian-Dutch rock bands were also very popular, such as The Tielman Brothers, which was founded in 1947 by several youths from Kupang (Reggy, Ponthon, Andy and Loulou Tielman). The band is generally seen as the founder of Indorock, although other Indorock bands have existed before them. Being ethnically Indonesian and playing Western music for white audiences in the Netherlands and Germany.

During that time, Dara Puspita emerged as a pop rock group consisting of women from Surabaya, Indonesia, which was active in the 1960s and early 1970s. The band was formed in 1964, with Titiek Rachman and his sister Lies on guitar. Apart from that, Ani Kusuma is a rhythm guitarist, and Susy Nander is a drummer. When Lies left the band for a month in 1965 to complete his education, his bass position was replaced by Titiek Hamzah. When Lies returned, Ani Kusuma left the band, and Lies became a rhythm guitarist. This female rock band was also influential in the early development of rock music in Indonesia. In fact, not only the rock scene, Indonesian pop was also quite influenced by the Dara Puspita band.

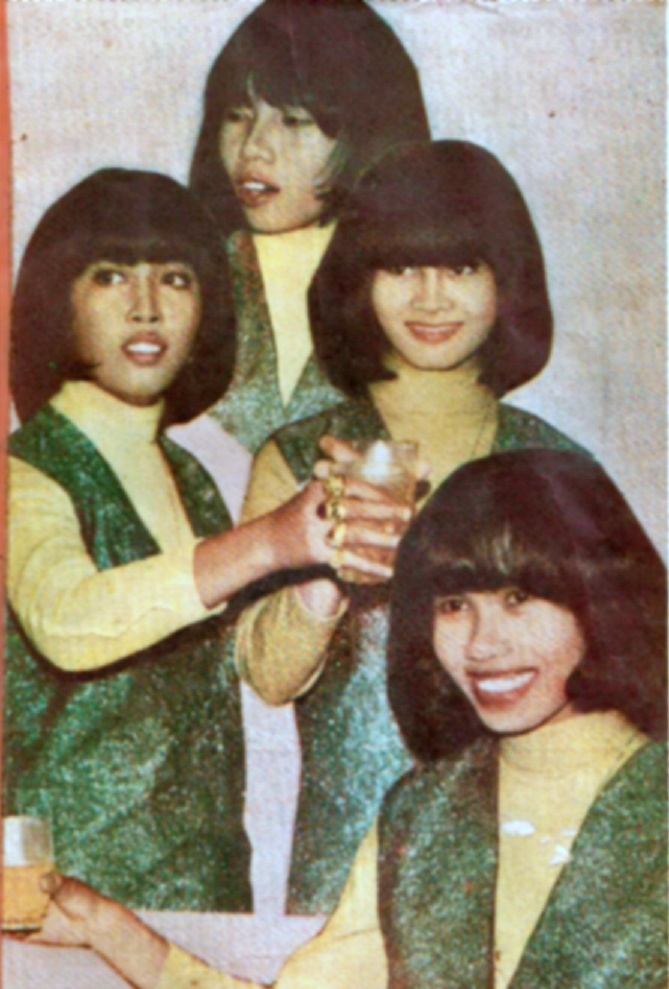
Dara Puspita, Indonesian pop rock band with all female members

In July 1968, the band left Indonesia, and toured to Europe and Asia, including West Germany, Hungary, England, France, Belgium, the Netherlands, Spain, Iran, and Turkey. Touring for three years, before returning to Indonesia on 3 December 1971. In this way, Dara Puspita also gained international popularity even though the support base was still larger in the local music scene.

=== 1970s - 1990s ===
The development of rock music in Indonesia grew rapidly when bands like God Bless, Gang Pegangsaan, Shark Move, Giant Step, Abbhama and Rawa Rontek moved quickly to strengthen the rock music genre in Indonesia. Along with the development of rock music in the country, the term "underground" emerged to group bands with the concept of loud, wild, extreme and progressive music.

The 1980s can be said to be the golden era of rock music in Indonesia because early 1988 became the first history in which rock music was performed directly in front of the public.

Then when the rock kapak (otherwise known as Malay slow rock) music from the neighboring country of Malaysia started to flourish thanks to the appearance of the band Search through the hit song "Isabella", the genre began to garner widespread popularity. An Indonesian musician who is famous for playing the rock kapak genre is Deddy Dores.

In addition, there are also many works of Deddy Dores performed by Nike Ardilla, Cony Dio, Poppy Mercury, and Mayang Sari. The pattern of Indonesian slow rock has also plagued other musicians or singers in Indonesia such as Oppie Andaresta, Minel, Inka Christie, Lady Avisha, Cut Irna, and others. The popularity of Indonesian slow rock occurred during the 1980s until the 1990s. In that era, Indonesian rock mostly had a melodic and melancholic music style

The promoter who is familiarly called Log Zhelebour organized the Indonesian Rock Festival sponsored by Djarum. With this festival, many musicians and bands emerged from this festival. Singers and bands that have been handled by Log Zhelebour to develop their careers include Ita Purnamasari, Mel Shandy, Lady Avisha, Nicky Astria, Elpamas, Emperor, Power Metal, Gank Pegangsaan, Boomerang, and Jamrud, Slank, Dewa 19, Gigi. Log Zhelebour influence on the Indonesian rock music scene stretched from 1984 to 2004.

The 90s also saw the emergence of indie rock bands. The initiator of indie music emerged from Bandung with the concept of DIY through bands like PAS Band. PAS Band was officially founded in 1990. In 1993 it released an EP album on an indie label with its debut, Four Through The Sap. Apart from that, there were also other indie bands such as Pure Saturday, Koil, and Rumah Sakit.

=== 2000s ===
Entering the third millennium, rock music in Indonesia has more variety. Apart from the legacy of independent music from the 1990s which has offered many new references, the various types of rock in the national realm are also intertwined with the symptoms of the development of rock music in the international world.

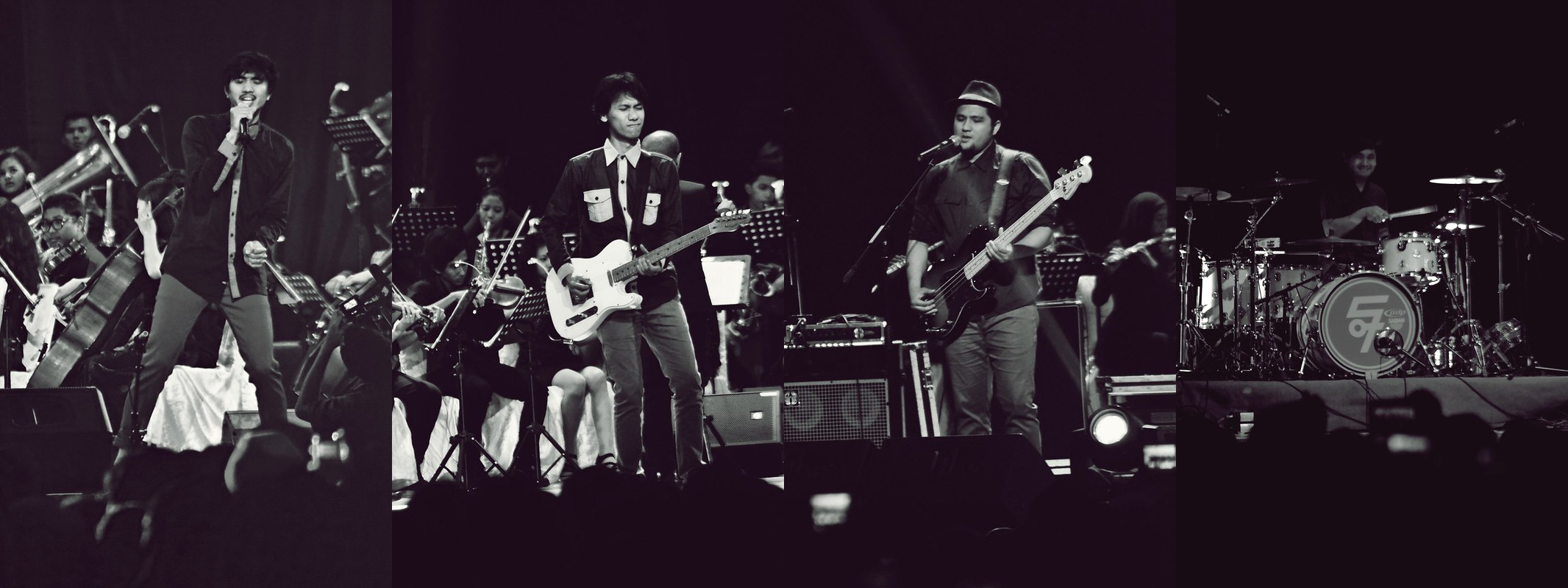
Sheila on 7, Indonesian alternative rock band formed in 1996, gained huge popularity in the 2000s

In this era, pop rock music has inspired many bands and musicians on the Indonesian mainstream music scene. Especially after Peterpan, which carries a concept similar to BritPop, received widespread attention from music lovers in Indonesia. Several other bands that can also be said to have received the spotlight include Dr PM, Ada Band, Nidji, Ungu and others. Meanwhile, previously, the symptoms had been visible through bands such as Sheila on 7, Cokelat, and Padi, who released their debut albums between 1999 and 2000.

At this time the alternative rock especially emo rock genre also began to grow in Indonesia. Bands that use the emo rock concept began to emerge, such as Seems Like Yesterday (2003), Alone At Last (2004), Killing Me Inside (2005), Last Child (2006), and Killed by Butterfly (2008).

== Rock festivals ==
Several regions in Indonesia also host many rock festivals. From small scale festivals to grand festivals. Generally rock festivals are held in big cities.

The following is a list of several rock festivals in Indonesia:

- Rock in Solo (Solo/Surakarta)
- Jogjarockarta (Jogjakarta)
- Rock in Celebes (Makassar)
- Rock in Borneo (Kutai Kartanegara)
- Doomsday Open Air (Bandung)
- Voice Hell (Purwokerto)
- We the Fest (Jakarta)
- Gudfest (Jakarta)
- Java Rockin Land (Jakarta)
- Djarum Super Rock Festival (Jakarta)
- Soundrenaline (Bali)

== See also ==
- Indo pop
- Indonesian heavy metal
- Alternative
- Turbo-folk, presenting similarities with 90's Indonesian rock music.
- Music of Indonesia
- List of Indonesian musicians
