= Our Biggest Thing Ever =

Studio album by Last Child
- Released: January 2012
- Genre: Alternative rock; pop rock; slow rock; power pop
- Label: Dr.m; Music Factory Indonesia

Last Child chronology
Everything We Are Everything (2009)	Our Biggest Thing Ever (2012)

Singles from Our Biggest Thing Ever
- 1. "Seluruh Nafas Ini" Released: February 2012

Our Biggest Thing Ever is the studio album by Indonesian alternative rock band Last Child, released in 2012. In marketing this album, Last Child and the record label working with KFC that this album will be circulated in all KFC stores in Indonesia.

== Track listing ==
No.	Title	Length
1.	"Sadarkan Mu"	04:33
2.	"Cinta Semestinya"	03:22
3.	"Rindumu Disana"	03:14
4.	"Seluruh Nafas ini (ft. Giselle)"	04:52
5.	"Percayalah (New)"	03:46
6.	"Sekuat Hatimu"	04:44
7.	"Teringat Apa Yang Kau Berikan"	04:18
8.	"Jalan Lain Ke Hatimu"	03:55
9.	"Indahkah Perbedaan"	04:21
10.	"Terima Kasih"	03:48
11.	"Seharusnya"	04:27

Bonus Track
No.	Title	Length
12.	"Pedih (New)"	04:15
13.	"Percayalah"	03:29
