= Silent Knight (band) =

Australian power metal band

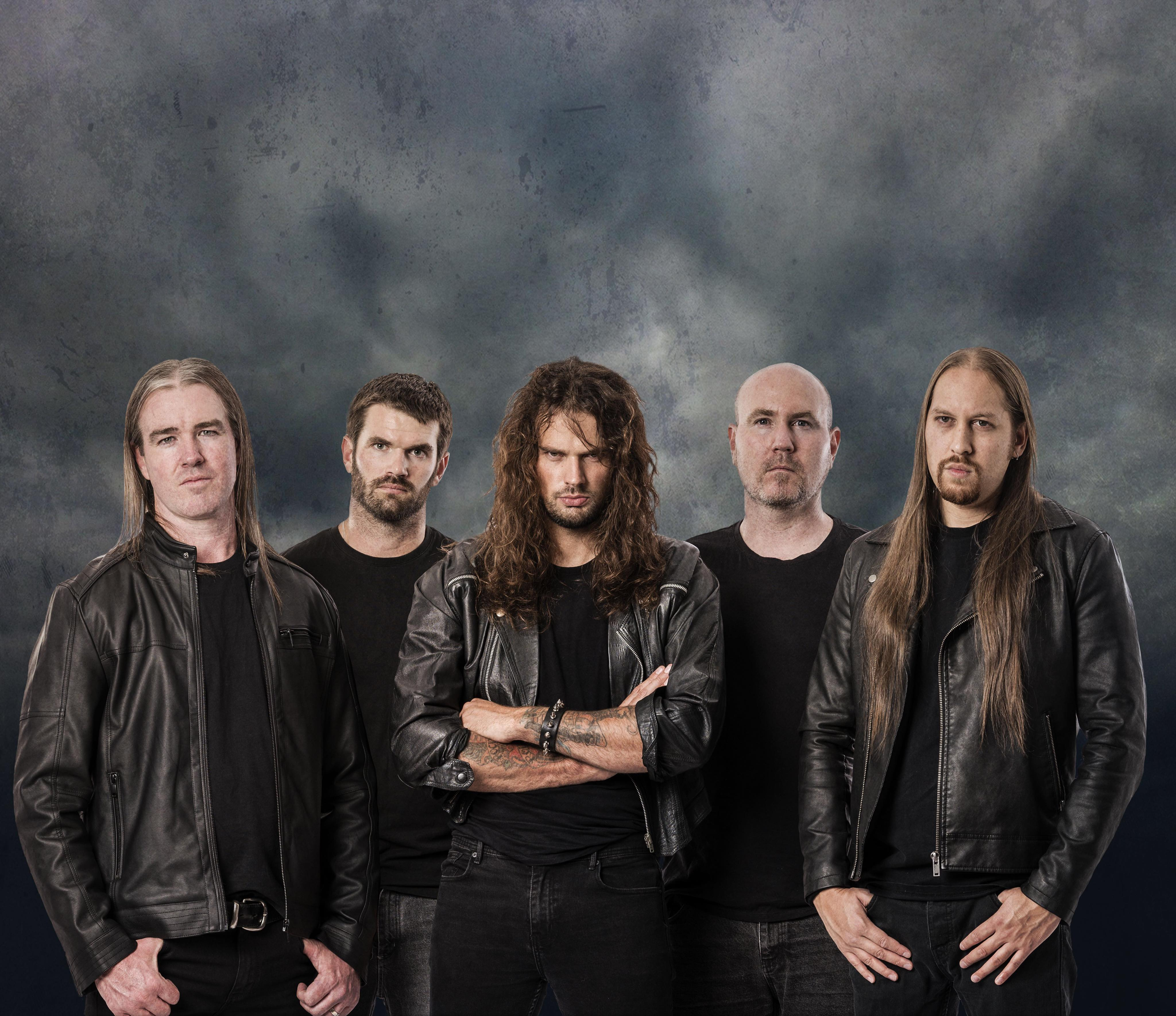
- Silent Knight current lineup

Background information
- Origin: Perth, Western Australia
- Genres: Power metal, heavy metal
- Years active: 2009–present
- Label: Independent
- Members: Stu McGill; Cam Nicholas; Cameron Daw; Dan Grainger; Dan Brittain
- Past members: Zoran C.; Paul Wrigley; Jesse Onur Oz
- Website: www.silentknight.com.au

Silent Knight is an Australian power metal band from Perth, Western Australia. The band has been recognized to be among the leading Australian power metal acts. Silent Knight has released three studio albums and two EPs, and regularly performs throughout Australia in a headlining capacity as well as opening for international touring acts, while also making select appearances at festivals in Europe and Asia.

== History ==
Silent Knight was formed by guitarists Stu McGill and Cameron Nicholas in late 2009. The band has strong power metal roots and is influenced heavily by melodic European bands such as Iron Maiden, Helloween and Gamma Ray, crossed with the aggressive speed of American bands like Iced Earth and Megadeth. Initially, McGill and Nicholas were joined by Zoran C. (vocals), Cameron Daw (bass) and Paul Wrigley (drums).

In February 2013, they released their debut album, Masterplan, to favorable reviews by the international metal press. An Australian tour followed, as well as shows supporting former Iron Maiden vocalists Paul Di'Anno and Blaze Bayley and Finnish folk metal act Korpiklaani.

2014 saw the departure of Zoran C. and Wrigley, who were replaced by Turkish born vocalist Jesse Onur Oz and drummer Dan Grainger, respectively. Silent Knight released a new EP entitled Power Metal Supreme in October 2014. The EP featured one new original composition, "Prisoner of Your World," live versions of four tracks from the Masterplan album performed by the new lineup, and a cover of the Helloween song "Keeper of the Seven Keys," as selected by the fans in an online poll.

In 2015, the band performed abroad for the first time in Jakarta, Indonesia at the Hammersonic Festival, which is the biggest metal and rock festival in Southeast Asia. Shortly thereafter, Silent Knight performed with Megadeth bassist David Ellefson. The band returned to the studio and, in October 2015, released their second full-length album, Conquer & Command. Once again, the album was well-received by the underground metal press. Original drummer Paul Wrigley returned to the band for the ensuing tour, which included dates throughout Australia; an appearance at the Daimonous Open Air Festival in Bali, Indonesia; and opening slots for Helloween and Zakk Wylde’s Black Label Society.

In January 2017, Silent Knight released their second EP. Entitled The Angel Reborn, the EP featured a re-recording of "When the Fallen Angel Flies" from the Masterplan album, live versions of four tracks from Conquer & Command, an acoustic version of "The Raven’s Return," and a cover of the Megadeth song "Holy Wars … The Punishment Due," which was again selected by the fans in an online poll.

Also in 2017, Silent Knight re-recorded the entire Masterplan album under the moniker The Masterplan, featuring the current lineup, revamped artwork, and a more powerful production. Dan Grainger returned to the band on drums in time for the ensuing live activities, which included a show with DragonForce, a tour of Germany including an appearance at the 20th anniversary of the Headbangers Open Air Festival, and yet another Australian tour.

In October 2019 Onur Oz announced his departure from the band for personal reasons. Silent Knight recruited lead singer Dan Brittain (best known as ex-vocalist for Shots Fired and Melbourne-based party metallers Electrik Dynamite) to cover show commitments.

As of March 2020, Silent Knight are well into the writing process for their third full-length album. The band’s first new studio output in two years was a cover version of Gamma Ray’s "Dethrone Tyranny" released in June 2019 as a digital single, and on a Gamma Ray tribute cassette via Burning Sun Records in Hungary. Several live performances followed, including another support slot with Korpiklaani. In late 2019, Silent Knight performed at multiple international festivals, including a headlining appearance at the November Rain Festival in Semarang, in the Central Java province in Indonesia, as well as a slot at the Southern Gathering Festival in Melbourne, Australia, alongside Turilli / Lione Rhapsody, among others including Vanishing Point and Black Majesty. They also played a show in support of former Manowar guitarist Ross the Boss.

In 2022, the band formally announced their long-teased third album, Full Force, and released it on 23 September 2022 to favourable reviews.

== Discography ==
=== Studio albums ===
- Masterplan (2013, re-recorded in 2017)
- Conquer & Command (2015)
- Full Force (2022)

=== EPs ===
- Power Metal Supreme – (2014)
- The Angel Reborn – (2017)

== Band Members ==
Current members

- Stu McGill - ryhthm guitar, backing vocals (2009–present)
- Cameron Nicholas - lead guitar (2009–present)
- Cameron Daw - bass guitar (2009–present)
- Dan Grainger - drums (2014-2015, 2017–present)
- Dan Brittain - lead vocals (2019–present)

Former members

- Zoran C. - lead vocals (2009-2014)
- Paul Wrigley - drums (2009-2014, 2015-2017)
- Jesse Onur Oz - lead vocals (2014-2019)
