= Masterplan (Silent Knight album) =

Studio album by Silent Knight
- Released: 15 February 2013
- Genre: Power metal
- Length: 46:04

Silent Knight chronology
Masterplan (2013)	Conquer & Command (2015)

Masterplan is the debut full-length album by Australian power metal band Silent Knight, released on 15 February 2013. A full re-recorded version of the album, titled The Masterplan, was released on 10 July 2017 The re-recording shows a step up in production compared to the original and includes vocals by Jesse Onur Oz instead of Zoran Cunjack. The band embarked on an Australian tour promoting both The Masterplan and Conquer & Command, entitled the Master & Command tour. The setlist contains tracks from both albums, including tracks that were never performed live before and "a cover thrown in there for some fun".

== Track listing ==
No.	Title	Length
1.	"Prelude: Fear and Tyranny"	1:37
2.	"The Curse of the Black Rose"	3:45
3.	"Masterplan"	4:53
4.	"Prophets of War"	4:56
5.	"Silent Apparitions (In the Night)"	4:46
6.	"Pay Your Dues"	6:37
7.	"Evil Is Thy Name"	5:31
8.	"When the Fallen Angel Flies"	6:44
9.	"Dare to Dream"	7:15

== Personnel ==
- Zoran Cunjack – lead vocals (original)
- Jesse Onur Oz – lead vocals (re-recording)
- Stu McGill – rhythm guitar, co-lead vocals
- Cam Nicholas – lead guitar
- Cameron Daw – bass guitar
- Paul Wrigley – drums
