= Full Force (Silent Knight album) =

Studio album by Silent Knight
- Released: 23 September 2022
- Genres: Power metal, heavy metal
- Length: 42:39

Silent Knight chronology
Conquer & Command (2015)	Full Force (2022)

Professional ratings
Review scores
Source	Rating
Eternal Terror	4/6
Metal Factory	5.5/10
Metal Forces	6.5/10
Wall of Sound	9/10

Full Force is the third full-length album by Australian power metal band Silent Knight, released on 23 September 2022. A single was released for the title track.

== Track listing ==
No.	Title	Length
1.	"Blood in the Water"	5:51
2.	"Full Force"	6:24
3.	"The Last Candle Burns"	5:38
4.	"Dark & Mysterious Times"	3:51
5.	"Screaming Eagle"	5:22
6.	"Into Oblivion"	5:17
7.	"Awakening"	5:15
8.	"Create a New World"	5:01

== Personnel ==
Silent Knight

- Dan Brittain – lead vocals
- Stu McGill – rhythm guitar, co-lead vocals
- Cam Nicholas – lead guitar
- Cameron Daw – bass guitar
- Dan Grainger – drums

Production

- Mixed by Chris Themelco at Monolith Studios, Melbourne, Australia.
- Mastered by Thomas "Plec" Johansson at The Panic Room, Skövde, Sweden.
- Engineered by Cameron Nicholas.
