= Deranged (band) =

Swedish death metal band

- Origin: Hjärup, Sweden
- Genres: Death metal, grindcore
- Years active: 1991–2008, 2009–present
- Labels: Sevared Records
- Members: Rikard Wermén; Thomas Ahlgren; Andreas Johansson; Anders Johansson
- Past members: Calle Fäldt; Roger Johansson; Johan Anderberg; Fredrick Sandberg; Andreas Deblèn; Per Gyllenbäck; Mikael Bergman; Dan Bengsston; Martin Schönherr

Deranged is a Swedish death metal band formed in 1991. The band was named after the 1974 movie Deranged.

Despite the band's Swedish nationality, Metal Hammer stated the opinion that the band's "brand of death metal just doesn’t sound that Swedish at all."

== History ==
Formed in 1991, Deranged is a band in the Swedish scene. Unlike bands such as Grave, Entombed and Dismember, Deranged does not have the more melodic Swedish sound their contemporaries are known for and plays a very fast and technical deathgrind with several groove influences. Drawing inspirations from Cannibal Corpse, Carcass, Morbid Angel, Suffocation and Napalm Death, the band is better associated with US death metal.

The band have released the singles The Confessions of a Necrophile -title directly extracted of the movie- (1992) and Upon the Medical Slab (1994), the EPs The Confessions Continue (1993), Architects of Perversions (1994) and Sculpture of the Dead (1996) and the albums Rated X (1995), High on Blood (1998), III (2000), Deranged (2001), Plainfield Cemetery (2002), Obscenities in B-Flat (2006), The Redlight Murder Case (2008) and Cut, Carve, Rip, Serve (2011). Also, in 2001 the band did a split with Abscess.

Throughout the years, the band suffered several drastic changes in the line-up and in November 2007, the original members were Rikard Wermén (drums) and Axel Johansson (guitar). In March 2008, Wermén left the band, which disbanded in July after several problems between Axelsson and Martin Schönherr. The band was resurrected in the summer of 2009, with Wermén and Schönherr on their original duties, but with Thomas Ahlgren (formerly on bass) on guitar because Axelsson was not there, and with Andreas Johansson on bass. After some festival gigs across Europe and a short Russian tour, the band returned to Berno Studio in February 2011, to record the "come-back" album Cut Carve Rip Serve, which was released via the US label Sevared Records.

In August 2011, Schönherr left the band, leaving Ahlgren to handle the vocals for a second Russian tour and the Rock in Solo festival in Indonesia. The following year, the band played in their first national show after 2007; also, the band announced the arrival of a new vocalist, Anders Johansson (ex-Vomitous).

== Discography ==
Studio albums

- Rated X (1995)
- High on Blood (1998)
- III (2000)
- Deranged (2001)
- Plainfield Cemetery (2002)
- Obscenities in B-Flat (2006)
- The Redlight Murder Case (2008)
- Cut, Carve, Rip, Serve (2011)
- Struck by a Murderous Siege (2016)
- Deeds of Ruthless Violence (2020)

Other releases

- The Confessions of a Necrophile (demo, 1992)
- ...The Confessions Continues (EP, 1993)
- Upon the Medical Slab (demo, 1994)
- Architects of Perversions (EP, 1994)
- Sculpture of the Dead (EP, 1996)
- Abscess/Deranged (split, 2001)
- Morgue Orgy (EP, 2013)

== Members ==
=== Current members ===
- Thomas Ahlgren (guitar)
- Rikard Wermén (drums)
- Andreas Johansson (bass)
- Anders Johansson (vocals)

=== Former members ===
- Jörgen Byllander (bass)
- Dan Bengtsson (bass, 1997)
- Mikael Westerdahl (guitar, 1991–1993)
- Johan Axelsson (guitars, 1991–2008)
- Calle Fäldt (bass/vocals, 2002–2007)
- Roger Johansson (backing voice, 2001–2002)
- Johan Anderberg (bass/guitar/vocals, 2000–2001)
- Fredrick Sandberg (vocals, 1996–1999)
- Andreas Deblèn (vocals)
- Per Gyllenbäck (vocals, 1991–1996)
- Mikael Bergman (bass, 1994–1995)
- Martin Schönherr (vocals)
