= Conquer & Command =

Studio album by Silent Knight
- Released: 1 October 2015
- Genre: Power metal
- Length: 45:45

Silent Knight chronology
Masterplan (2013)	Conquer & Command (2015)	Full Force (2022)

Professional ratings
Review scores
Source	Rating
Metal Reviews	75/100
Metal-Roos	5/5

Conquer & Command is the second full-length album by Australian power metal band Silent Knight, released in 2015. The album's success led to the band touring Australia and Indonesia, opening for Helloween and Black Label Society.

== Track listing ==
No.	Title	Length
1.	"A Call to Arms"	1:22
2.	"Conquer & Command"	5:09
3.	"Empty Threat"	5:24
4.	"Prisoner of Your World"	5:08
5.	"The Call of the Crow"	4:38
6.	"The Strike of the Sword"	5:31
7.	"The Raven's Return"	4:22
8.	"One by One"	4:56
9.	"Power Metal Supreme"	5:15
10.	"The Final Countdown" (Europe cover) (bonus track)	4:00

== Personnel ==
- Jesse Onur Oz – lead vocals
- Stu McGill – rhythm guitar, co-lead vocals
- Cam Nicholas – lead guitar
- Cameron Daw – bass guitar
- Paul Wrigley – drums
