= Not Called Jinx =

German rock band

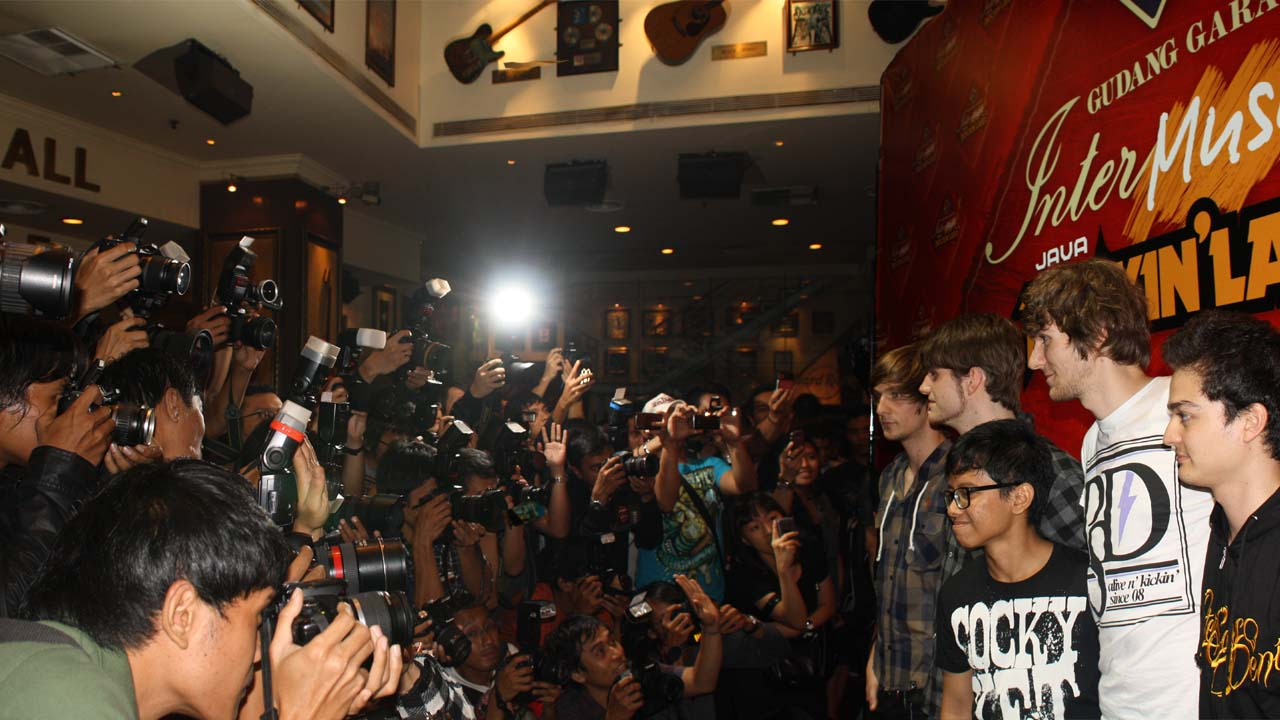
- Not Called Jinx at the Hard Rock Cafe Jakarta

Background information
- Origin: Berlin, Germany
- Genres: Alternative rock
- Members: Kilian Peters; Adrian Tschoepke; Thomas Kosslick (since 2009); The Ace (since 2012)
- Past members: Arseny Knaifel (2005–2009); Vincent Petsch (2005–2012); Irzan Raditya (2009–2013)
- Website: notcalledjinx.com

Not Called Jinx is a German alternative rock band from Berlin, formed in 2005. They decided to only write songs with English lyrics due to the sound of the phonetics in the German language. The band consists of lead vocalist Kilian Peters, the guitarists and vocalists Eypee Kaamiño and Thomas Kosslick and drummer The Ace.

In 2010 they played on the Java Rockin'land Festival in Jakarta, Indonesia, which is the largest rock festival in South-East Asia. They have also played as a support act for the US band All Time Low and The Audition. A year later, they toured around 10 countries in Europe together with the Swedish rock band Royal Republic.

== History ==
=== 2005–2008 ===
The band formed in the early summer of 2005 as a fun-project, to be able to join a band contest at school. After an unexpected victory, they decided to change their bandmembers to a more competent and skillful manner. This is when the four-headed band, Kilian Peters, Adrian Tschoepke, Vincent Petsch and with former bassist Arseny Knaifel began their career in September 2005.

In the beginning, the genre of the band was considered more to be pop-punk. The band themselves said they were doing power pop. In October 2005, they recorded their first EP with the title The Awesome Foursome and shortly after, the EP Sex, Drugs and Powerpop (May 2006) followed. Due to the discontent of the band with their own songs and abrupt change in the style of music, both EPs were never released as CDs. They used the songs only for online and demo purposes.

In September 2006, the band recorded their third EP Don't Say Anything with producer Greg Dinunzi and Neil "Harry" Harrison.

In May 2007, the band recruited 5BUGS guitarist and producer Florian Nowak and recorded their fourth EP, which they named Who Needs Winners Anyway. The EP was released on 15 September 2007.

2008 was the year when Not Called Jinx played a lot of gigs and festivals. Their EP Who Needs Winners Anyway catapulted them into the Myspace-charts. In the category "no label" they reached rank 36 in the genre rock, rank 7 in pop-punk and rank 1 in the genre emo in Germany. In this year they also won first place in a band contest which allowed them to play at the Open Flair Festival in Eschwege, Germany in front of thousands of people. The festival was headlined by The Hives and Die Ärzte.

=== 2009–2012 ===
In 2009, Arseny Knaifel left the band because of his affection and exceptionally positive addiction to the Chinese culture. Thomas Kosslick and Irzan Raditya joined the group shortly after Arseny's retirement. On 21 September 2009 the young lads played together with All Time Low and The Audition from the US in Berlin. In February 2009, Not Called Jinx toured with the famous German punk rock band Itchy Poopzkid and shortly after toured with the German rock band 5BUGS for 2 weeks. Right after the tour with 5BUGS, the group recorded their first album called Phoenix Arising in the Daily Hero Studio in Berlin, Kreuzberg once again with producer Florian Nowak. The Album was released in April 2011 under the label Monster Artists and BMG Rights.

In October 2010, Not Called Jinx played at the Java Rockin Land Festival 2010 in Jakarta, Indonesia, the largest rock festival in South-East Asia. This was their first tour outside of Europe. Aside from other famous international acts such as The Smashing Pumpkins, Stereophonics, Dashboard Confessional, Social Code, etc. they headlined the pre-event of the JRL Festival in Surabaya. Specially for Indonesia, they released another EP called New Beginnings, which they offered as a free download on their website. While staying for two weeks in Indonesia, Not Called Jinx not only played at the Java Rockin Land Festival, but also visited a various number of radio and TV stations for interviews and meet and greets.

In 2011, some songs of Phoenix Arising have been placed in rotation by various German radio networks. The band also supported the Swedish rock band Royal Republic in 10 countries at their We Are The Royal European Tour 2011 in September and October.

In 2012, Not Called Jinx played on various festivals and supported the German rock band 5Bugs on their last tour for several days. In November they played with the Indonesian pop-rock band Rocket Rockers in Berlin on their PeterSaysDenim Invasion Tour, that was organized by their Indonesian apparel endorser. In the end of 2012, Vincent Petsch, the drummer and co-founder of Not Called Jinx, left the band. A few weeks later, a new drummer was recruited. Ace is an old friend and drummer of Tommy's former band The Breathalyzers.

=== 2013–2015 ===
Early 2013, a cooperation resulted between the band and the booking agency K.O.K.S. Music. In March, Not Called Jinx went on a headliner tour for several weeks in Germany with the pop-punk band Insert Coin. Not Called Jinx subsequently signed a contract with the record label SPV. In October, the band went to Daily Hero Recordings once again, to record their second album that should be named The Manual. During the process, Irzan Raditya and Not Called Jinx parted ways.

In 2014, the band published their first single off their new album Palm of My Hand on 4 May 2014. They released their second single "Rust & Bones" on 2 August 2014 before releasing the album The Manual on 22 August 2014.

Not Called Jinx played a two-week tour in Germany with the band The Intersphere from Mannheim, Germany.

After a few shows in 2015, the band has not been active since.

== Discography ==
EPs

- "The Awesome Foursome" (2005)
- "Sex, Drugs and Powerpop" (2006)
- "Don't Say Anything" (2006/07)
- "Who needs Winners Anyway" (2007)
- "New Beginnings" (2010)

Studio albums

- "Phoenix Arising" (2011)
- "The Manual" (2014)
