= Rotor (band) =

Indonesia thrash metal band

- Origin: Jakarta, Indonesia
- Genres: Thrash metal; nu metal; industrial metal
- Years active: 1991–1998
- Labels: AIRO; Hemagita; Warner
- Past members: Muhammad Irvan Sembiring; R.M. Sri Seto Cokro; Didi Wakidi; Burn Bufthaim; Juda Pranyoto; Jodie Gondokusumo; Yurgo Vourgalis; Arief Aziz; Maruli Tampubolon; Ramadhanny Hussein; Ungky Blues; Word of Al Hakim I

Rotor is a thrash metal music band from Jakarta that was formed in 1991 and fronted by Irvan Sembiring. This band's name skyrocketed even more after successfully becoming the supporting act for Metallica's concert for two consecutive days at the Lebak Bulus Stadium in Jakarta in 1993.

Even though it was formed in Jakarta, Rotor's debut stage was at Taman Topi. In a rock performance held by a private radio in Bogor, this thrasher quartet appeared together with their metal colleagues from Jakarta, including Atomic and Alien Scream. At that time they were still performing songs belonging to the band from Brazil, namely Sepultura.

== Discography ==
- Behind the 8th Ball (1992)
- Eleven Keys (1995)
- New Blood (1996)
- Menang (1997)

=== Tribute album ===
- A tribute to Rotor (2002)

=== Compilation album ===
- Remastered (2010)

== See also ==
- Indonesian heavy metal
