= Last Child (band) =

Indonesian alternative rock band

- Origin: East Jakarta, Indonesia
- Genres: Pop punk; alternative rock; pop rock; power pop
- Years active: 2006–present
- Labels: Fake Records; dr.m
- Members: Virgoun; Dimas Rangga; Rachmad "Mamie" Firdaus Hidayat; Ipank Rizki
- Past members: Ary Ceper; Yodi

Last Child is an Indonesian pop punk/ alternative rock band formed in 2006. The band's current members are Virgoun (vocals and guitar), Rachmad Firdaus (guitar), Dimas Rangga (vocals and bass). It has released one mini album and two studio albums.

== History ==
The name "Last Child" was chosen because the band founders are the last (youngest) children of their respective families.

== Career ==
The band was formed in 2006 in East Jakarta by schoolmates Virgoun Teguh (guitar and vocals), Dimas Rangga (bass), and Ary Ceper (drums). Later Ary left the band, while Rachmad Firdaus joined as a guitarist.

The group's first album was Grow Up, a mini album. It was released independently. Virgoun described it as having many socially-themed protests.

In 2008, Last Child released their first studio album, Everything We Are Everything, was released by Fake Records. Virgoun said that the album touches different issues from the independent album, "from love to spiritualism".

In 2009, the band signed a contract with the local studio dr.m to promote the ringtone for "Diary Depresiku" ("My Depression Diary"), about a kid wrought with emotional turmoil after a divorce, which reached 300,000 downloads. Indah Setiawati wrote that the song has bitter lyrics and a slow melody. The second single, "Pedih" ("Sore"), was in a rock style but had melancholic lyrics. The third single released by dr.m was "Percayalah" ("Trust").

The band released Our Biggest Thing Ever, its second album, in January 2012 through dr.m. The songs were mostly written by Virgoun. One of the songs, "Seluruh Nafas Ini" ("This Whole Breath") features Giselle, who was a finalist in the 2008 series of Indonesian Idol.

== Influences ==
The band members said that their musical style is influenced by Blink 182, MXPX, Angels and Airwaves, Rancid, Green Day, We the Kings, and Sheila on 7. Morin Chandra, the chief commercial officer of dr.m, said that the band has "strong lyrics, which reflect real life, not merely something out of [their] imagination".
