= Fort Vastenburg =

18th-century Dutch fort in Indonesia

Coordinates: 7.572058°S 110.831276°E

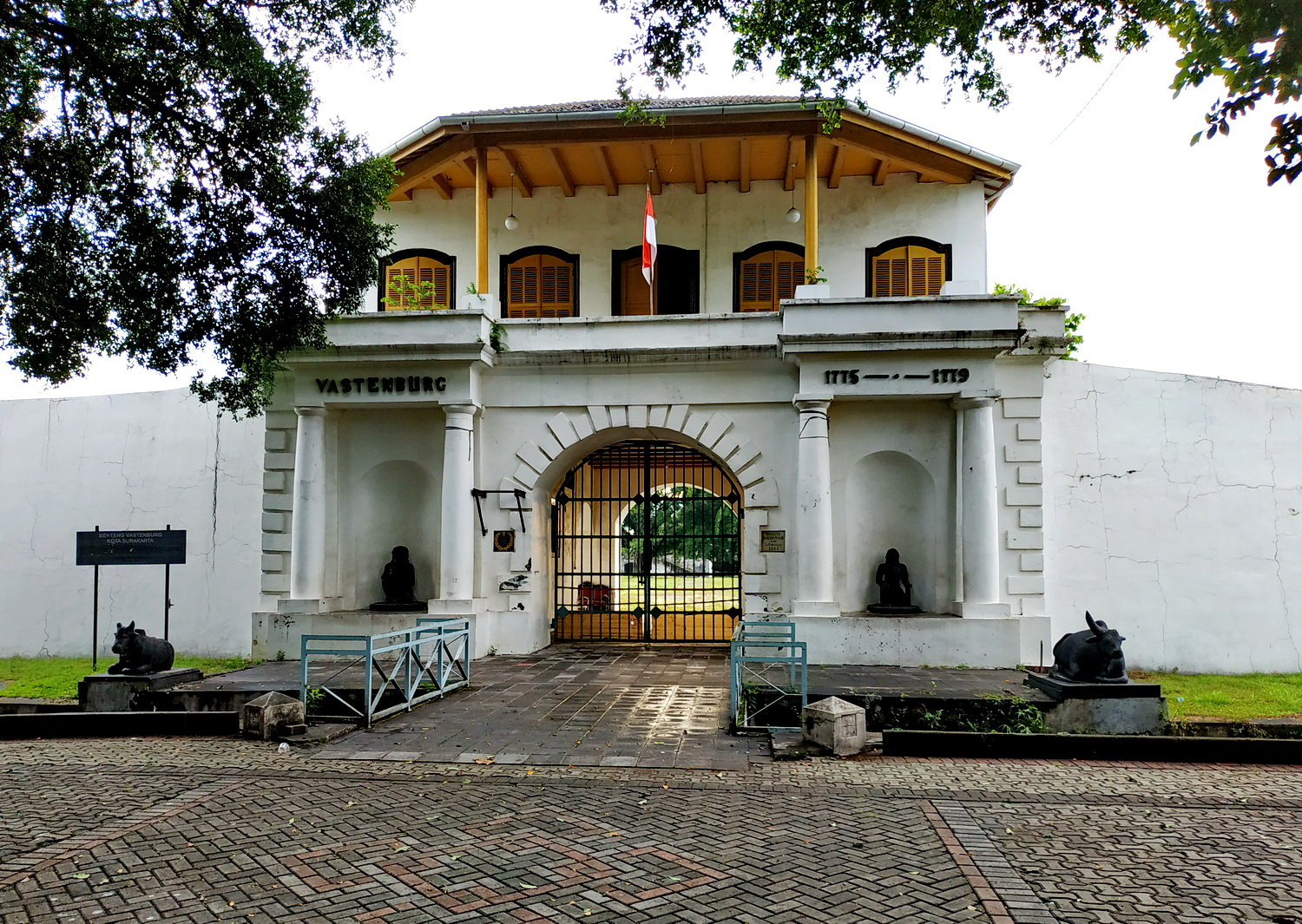
Fort Vastenburg in Surakarta

Fort Vastenburg (Dutch "Fort Steadfast"), also Fort Surakarta, is an 18th-century Dutch fort located in Gladak, Surakarta, Central Java, Indonesia. A landmark of Surakarta, the fort faces polemics related with multiple owners claiming different parts of the fort. As a result, the fort remains abandoned and threatened to be demolished by various private parties claiming the fort's ownership.

== Description ==
Fort Vastenburg is a square shaped fort with four bastions. It is surrounded by 6 meter high bearing wall and dry moat. Three portals providing entrance to the fort from the east, west, and north. A Canal style bascule bridge (similar to Jembatan Kota Intan in Batavia) used to provide access point to the fort's western main portal, however this has been demolished.

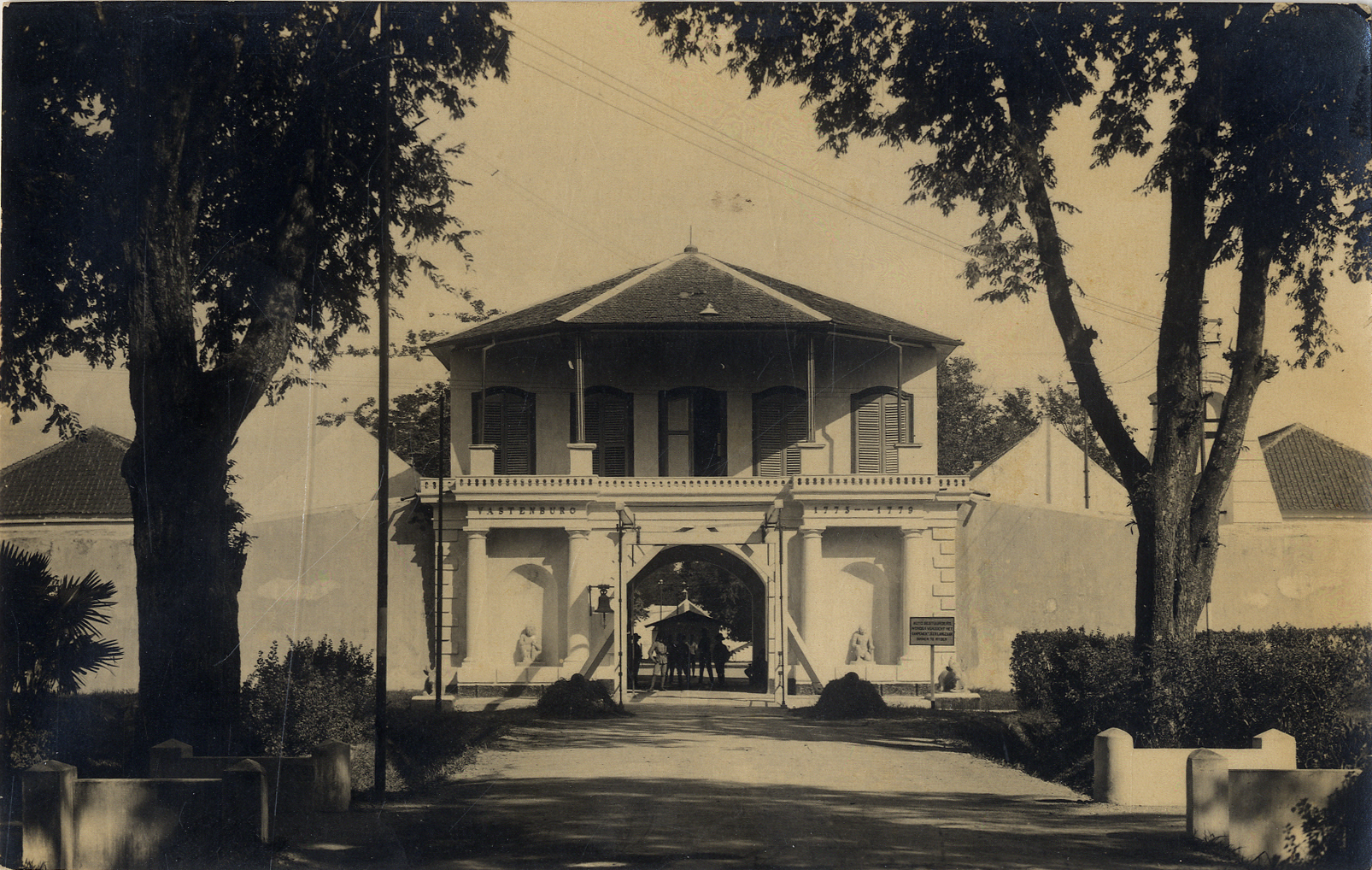
Fort Vastenburg

== History ==
There are differing opinions about the construction date of Fort Vastenburg. Most agreed that Fort Vastenburg was constructed in 1743 and was completed in 1745, following the order of Governor-General Baron van Imhoff. First named de Grootmoedigheid ("magnanimity"), later the fort name was renamed to Vastenburg ("steadfast") (1750).

There is another claim that the de Grootmoedigheid was different with Fort Vastenburg. In this claim, construction of Fort Vastenburg was started in 1755 and completed in 1779, replacing a trading post de Grootmoedigheid which was constructed in 1743 close to Bandar Beton near Bengawan Solo. De Grootmoedigheid was one of a series of defense network set up by the Dutch East Indies Company (VOC) to maintain security in the Javanese trade network.

The main function of the fort was to house the resident (colonial administrator) and the Dutch East Indies garrison for the region of Central Java. The fort maintained order in Surakarta, especially between the royalties. Unlike the relatively united Yogyakarta royal court, the Sunanate of Surakarta was fractious. By 1757, Pakubuwono II faced a local rebellion from his royal relative Raden Mas Said. Under the Dutch Treaty of Salatiga, Raden Mas Said decided to build his own (smaller) palace — Kraton Mangkunegaran — establishing a second royal court in the city. This weakened the city's sense of integrity, and so Fort Vastenburg have the possible conflict between royalties checked.

Fort Vastenburg was further improved between 1772 and 1788. In the 19th century, the interior of the fort contains a number of military buildings surrounding a central courtyard. The buildings include residence for the member of the military (e.g. the Commander, the Captain, and the Lieutenant), a military hospital, a drugstore.

During the French-influenced government of Daendels, it was decided that a fort system was no longer the best strategy to maintain order in the colonial empire. Defense strategy was changed from centered defense strategy into territorial defense strategy, where instead of staying in a fort, the cavalry and artillery were placed on a more open area at the periphery. Barracks were built around the city, such as the barracks for the cavalries in Kestalan and the barracks for the artillery soldiers in Stabelan. Another military strategy introduced by Daendels was the construction of roads to enable mobility for the soldiers. Strategic points in the city were connected with new roads: the road in front of Fort Vastenburg connected it with the forts in Kartasura, Boyolali, Salatiga, Ungaran and Semarang. The resident's house was moved out of the fort, although still in close proximity. The Europeans did not stay in the fort any longer, but around the fort, forming a new European styled community complete with its facility such as Societeit. This European settlement can still be seen especially around the vicinity of Fort Vastenburg.

During the Japanese Occupation period, Fort Vastenburg was used by the Bala Dai Nippon army. After the independence of Indonesia, Fort Vastenburg was used by the National Army to maintain independence. From 1970s to 1980s Fort Vastenburg was used as a training ground for the Army Strategic Reserve Command (Kostrad), which acted as the RI Defense and Security Agency. Buildings inside the site were divided into residences for the member of the army and their family. From this time, the fort fell into disrepair. This is kept this way until 1986.

=== Issue of multiple owners ===
There are several attempts of reusing the land around the fort. In November 2008, one of the owner of the fort decided to build a thirteen floored hotel and a shopping mall on top of the fort. This caused protests from the public. As of 2015, a new Bank building owned by Danamon has been set up to the west of the fort. Several attempts have been made by the city government of Surakarta to take over the fort for public use. The Fort was named a cultural site protected in bylaw No. 1/2012 on Cultural Preservation. The city also created a bylaw, precluding seven of the land owners of Fort Vastenburg from extending their land use permits. The other two holders had extended the land permit use until 2032. Various events have been held in Fort Vastenburg since 2013, such as the Solo Carnival, Grand Gamelan Concert, Solo City Jazz Festival, Solo International Performing Arts, Solo Culinary Festival, Imlek Festival, Solo 24-hour Dance and Solo Kampoeng Arts.

== Works cited ==
- Bimo Hernowo (May 17, 2015). "Studi Tentang Lokasi Benteng-Benteng di Surakarta (1672, 1743, 1756, 1832)" [Study on the location of Surakarta's Forts]. Atrium: Jurnal Arsitektur (in Indonesian) (5). Universitas Kristen Duta Wacana. doi:10.13140/RG.2.1.2280.2085. Archived from the original on November 18, 2015.
- Kusumasari Ayuningtyas (March 17, 2012). "Vastenburg Fortress to undergo". the Jakarta Post. Jakarta. Archived from the original on November 19, 2015.
- Kusumasari Ayuningtyas (June 6, 2014). "Surakarta tries to take over Vastenburg fort". the Jakarta Post. Jakarta. Archived from the original on November 19, 2015.
- Parker, Lyn; Nilan, Pam (2013). Adolescents in Contemporary Indonesia. Routledge Contemporary Southeast Asia Series. Vol. 59. New York: Routledge. ISBN 9781134072316.
- "Awal Sebuah Interaksi, Benteng Vastenburg" [The beginning of an interaction, Fort Vastenburg]. Direktorat Jenderal Kebudayaan (in Indonesian). Balai Pelestarian Cagar Budaya Jawa Tengah. September 2, 2015. Archived from the original on 2015-11-23.
