= Godbless =

Godbless may refer to:

- Eruani Azibapu Godbless (born 1973), Nigerian businessman
- Godbless Lema (born 1976), Tanzanian politician
- Tima Godbless (born 2004), Nigerian athlete
- Vicky Lumentut (born Godbless Sofcar Vicky Lumentut, 1959), Indonesian politician
