= Bandung Berisik =

Series of metal music festivals in Indonesia

- The font logo of the Bandung Berisik festival
- Genre: Heavy Metal, Death Metal, Melodic Death Metal, Metalcore, Grindcore, Extreme Metal, etc
- Dates: Early June until late September; depending on the situation
- Locations: Bandung, Indonesia
- Years active: 1995 - 2014
- Founders: Ujungberung Rebels and Homeles Crew Metal Community
- Website: Official website

Bandung Berisik is a metal festivals in Indonesia. Founded by Bandung-based metal community Ujungberung Rebel and Homeless Crew. The festival's priority is to present bands across metal genres, based on underground scene popularity.

== History ==
The first Bandung Berisik was on September 23, 1995, in Kalimas field Ujung Berung Bandung City. The second was held in Saparua Sport Center on July 20, 1997. The third was held at Saparua Sport Center on June 13, 2002, after five years absence. A year later, on August 10, 2003, Bandung Berisik Metalfest has been back, in this fourth time, the stage was Persib FC stadium. After an eight-year break, Bandung Berisik was back. This time not in Bandung, but In Cimahi, another city that is located in West Java.

== Trivia ==
- Bandung Berisik is NOISY BANDUNG in English translation.
