= Hammersonic Festival =

Largest metal festival of southeastern Asia

- Genre: Heavy metal, punk rock, rock
- Frequency: Annually
- Locations: Jakarta, Indonesia
- Years active: 2012–2018; 2023-2024; 2026-present
- Website: hammersonic.com

Hammersonic Festival is an annual international rock and metal music festival held in Jakarta, Indonesia since 2012. This festival is known as the largest metal festival in Southeast Asia, which features a variety of metal bands from all over the world. Since its inception, the festival has featured international artists such as; Slipknot, Lamb of God, Megadeth, Bullet for My Valentine, As I Lay Dying, Epica, Kreator, Trivium and others.

In 2023, the festival is held by approximately 140,000 audiences, which around 20-25% of those are from abroad.

== Lineups ==
Year	Dates	Venue	Performers
2012	28 April 2012	Lapangan D, Gelora Bung Karno Sports Complex	Co-Headliners: Suffocation, DRI, Nile; International Acts: Dawn Heist, Chtonic, Nothnegal, Psycroptic, The Arson Project; Local Acts: Burgerkill, Deadsquad, Seringai, Sucker Head, Agnostic Front, Death Vomit, Noxa, Funeral Inception, Straight Out, Death Vertical, Down for Life, Massacre Conspiracy, Koil, GxSxD, Impiety, Divine Codex, Cyanide Serenity, Dreamer, Psycroptic
2013	27-28 April 2013	Allianz Eco Park, Ancol Dreamland	Co-Headliners: Cannibal Corpse, Cradle of Filth, Obituary; International Acts: Epica, As I Lay Dying, Destruction, Lock up, Gorod, Hour of Penance, Putrid Pile, Gorod, Kapital, Rezume, Unremains, Belligerent Intent, Sil Khannaz, Ethereal Sin, Whoretopsy, Inanimacy, Advent Sorrow, Sensory Amusia, Ouroboros, The Amenta, Voyager, Saturnian, Dyscarnate; Local Acts: Burgerkill, Power Metal, Seringai, Edane, Dying Fetus, Outright, Revenge, Down For Life, Kraken, Rising The Fall, Hellcrust, Sucker Head, Dead Vertical
2014	27 April 2014	Lapangan D, Gelora Bung Karno Sports Complex	Co-Headliners: Bullet for My Valentine, Kreator, Hatebreed; International Acts: Morbid Angel, Fleshgod Apocalypse, Belphegor, Origin, King Parrot; Local Acts: Burgerkill, Siksa Kubur, Jasad, Koil, Down for Life, Suri, Alice, Revenge The Fate, Final Attack, Paper Gangster, Deadly Weapon, Funeral Inception
2015	8 March 2015	Lapangan D, Gelora Bung Karno Sports Complex	Headliner: Lamb Of God; International Acts: Mayhem, Unearth, Ignite, Vader, Deathstar, Terrorizer, Avulsed, Warbringer, The Faceless, Heaven the Axe, Silent Knight; Local Acts: Mesin Tempur, Revenge The Fate, Roxx, Death Vomit, Nectura, Inlander, Beside, Thrashline, Fraud, Warkvlt, Salahudin Al Ayubi, Moses Bandwidth, Nails Of Imposition, Malmoved, Animistic, Cassandra, Colossvs, Demented Heart, Overthrown, Prostanica
2016	16-17 April 2016	Eco Park and E Convention, Ancol Dreamland	Co-Headliners: Asking Alexandria, Angra; International Acts: Darkest Hour, Suffocation, Drowning Pool, Walls of Jericho, Internal Bleeding, Obscura, Onslaught, Gorgoroth, Leave's Eyes, Rise of the Northstar, Local Acts: NOXA, Deadsquad, Edane, Koil, Revenge the Fate, Dead Vertical, Divine
2017	7 May 2017	Eco Park, Ancol Dreamland	Headliner: Megadeth; International Acts: Tarja, Abbath, The Black Dahlia Murder, Whitechapel, Entombed AD, Northlane, I See Stars, Earth Crisis, Putrid Pile; Local Acts: Burgerkill, Seringai, Siksa Kubur, Suckerhead, Revenge the Fate, Killharmonic, Vallendusk, Trojan
2018	22 July 2018	Carnaval Beach, Ancol Dreamland	Headliner: In Flames; International Acts: Dead Kennedys, Ihsahn, Escape the Fate, H20, Brujeira, Vital Remains, Revocation, Visceral Disgorge, Winds of Plague, Eternal Rest, Wardaemonic; Regional Acts: Valley of Chrome (Philippines), Deflled (Japan), Emerging from the Cocoon (Taiwan), Witchseeker (Singapore), Shambles (Thailand), Senjakala (Brunei); Local Acts: Deadsquad, Funeral Inception, Getah, Holykillers, RTF, Saint Loco, Straightout, Marjinal, Noxa, Hellcrust, Infery, Koil, Tcuklmay, Forgotten, Bersimbah Darah, Kameradz, Kalndestin, Misanthropic Imperium, Cerebral Endema, Down for Life
2019			Festival not held
2020			Festival cancelled due to COVID-19 pandemic
2021			Festival not held
2022			Festival not held
2023	18-19 March 2023	Carnaval Beach, Ancol Dreamland	Headliner: Slipknot; International Acts: Amon Amarth, Trivium, Black Flag, Story of the Year, Comeback Kid, Born of Osiris, Vio-lence, Tiny Moving Parts, Sinister, Within Destruction, Batushka, Disentomb, Devourment, Deez Nuts, Stillbirth, Suicide Silence, Watain; Regional Acts: Thy Regiment (Malaysia), Dads in the Park (Bangladesh), Greyhoundz (Philippines), Defying Decay (Thailand), World End Man (Japan); Local Acts: Deadsquad, Burgerkill, Holykillers, Jeruji, Muntah Kawat, Pure Wrath, Revenge The Fate, Straightout, Vox Mortis, Cancelled Acts: Saosin
2024	4-5 May 2024	Carnaval Beach, Ancol Dreamland	Co-Headliners: Lamb of God, A Day To Remember; International Acts: As I Lay Dying, Yngwie Malmsteen, Saosin, Atreyu, Cradle of Filth, Suicide Silence, Fear Factory, Marty Friedman, Suffocation, Misery Index, Crossfaith, We the Kings, Nervosa, Tiny Moving Parts, Venom Inc., Stand Atlantic, Blood Red Throne, Madball, Dvrk, Bleeding Through, Freedom of Fear, Speedball, Regional Acts: Annalynn (Thailand), Tools of the Trade (Malaysia), Arcadia (Philippines); Local Acts: Rezume, Strangers, Saint Loco, RE:UNION (Killing Me Inside); Cancelled Acts: Alesana, Converge
2025			Festival not held
2026	2-3 May 2026	Nusantara International Convention Exhibition, Pantai Indah Kapuk	Co-Headliners: Parkway Drive, Dashboard Confessional; International Acts: Memphis May Fire, A Skylit Drive, Of Mice & Men, Knuckle Puck, Blessthefall, Counterparts, Obscura, Hawthorne Heights, Lastelle, Jinjer, Malevolence, Speed, Crystal Lake, EMNW, The Red Jumpsuit Apparatus, Agnostic Front, Eyehategod, Lich King Senses Fail, Ellegarden; Regional Acts: Sekumpulan Orang Gila (Malaysia), Nocturnal Nihil (Taiwan), Typecast (Philippines); Local Acts: Deadsquad, Burgerkill, Strangers, TENHOLES, Pee Wee Gaskins, Dreamer, Gledeg, Fraud, Straight Answer, Cloath; Cancelled Acts: My Chemical Romance, The Story So Far, New Found Glory, The Haunted, Carpathian Forest, Gorilla Biscuits, Miss May I, Fleshgod Apocalypse
