= Deadsquad =

Indonesian death metal band

- Origin: Jakarta, Indonesia
- Genres: Death metal, technical death metal
- Years active: 2006–present
- Labels: Rottrevore, Armstretch
- Members: Stevie Item; Kharisma; Roy Ibrahim; Awan Graham
- Past members: see below

Deadsquad is an Indonesian death metal band formed in 2006 in Jakarta. The band was initially started as a project by guitarist Ricky Siahaan of Seringai and Stevie Item of Andra and The Backbone, but later developed into a full band.

== Career ==
=== Early formation ===
Deadsquad was formed in early 2006. Guitarists Stevie Item and Ricky Siahaan wanted to make a project band to fulfill their desire to play metal. Bassist Bonny Sidharta of the band Tengkorak and drummer Andyan Gorust, the former member of Siksakubur were invited to complete the formation. After Ricky Siahaan resigned in June 2006, Prisa Adinda of Zala was recruited to replace him. Shortly thereafter Babal was recruited to be a vocalist. They started to name the band Deadsquad around these times. In November 2007 Prisa Adinda left the band. Her successor Coki Bollemeyer of Netral joined the band one year after, precisely in October 2008. In the same month, singer Daniel Mardhany of the band Abolish Conception joined the band, replacing Babal.

=== Horror Vision ===
Horror Vision was released on 9 March 2009 by Rottrevore Records, coincided with Lamb of God concert in Jakarta. The album was also re-released by Malaysian label Dark Colloseum. The album consist of 8 tracks. Musically influenced by bands like Dying Fetus, Necrophagist, and Sepultura, the first track of the album Pasukan Mati tells about the brutality of right-wing fascist mob that are counterproductive. The guitar on this album was influenced by Steve Vai. However, the bass and vocals were not "audible". On "Manufaktur Replika Baptis", they called it tells a coercion of choosing religion in Indonesia. They also covered "Arise" as a tribute to Sepultura.

=== Second album and Bonny's departure ===
Deadsquad released the second album Profanatik in November 2013 through Armstretch Records. Bassist Bonny Sidharta left the band in March 2014. There is no official replacement has been made. However, the band hires Arslan Musyfia from the band Carnivored to fulfill bass position. They went through a couple of session player to fill in such as Anak Agung Gde (ex-Villes, Killing Me Inside, and Synystra) and Welby Cahyadi for some time until their original bassist Bonny returns to the band.

In July 2025, ahead of the band's European tour titled Obsidian Tour, bassist Shadu Rasjidi officially stepped down. Then Deadsquad signed Ronal Adrian (510) as tour musisian.

== Musical styles ==
The main genre of the band is death metal, mixed with technical, old school, new school, and sometimes with jazz fusion. In early career, they jammed and played songs from Slayer, Anthrax, and Sepultura. They are also influenced by Necrophagist, Visceral Bleeding, Spawn of Possession, Disavowed, Decrepit Birth, and Nile.

== Band members ==
=== Current members ===
- Stevie Item – guitars (2006–present)
- Kharisma – guitars (2015–present)
- Roy Ibrahim – drums (2020–present)
- Awan Graham – vocals (2026–present)
- Gilang Kinan J. - Bass (2026–present)

=== Former members ===
- Ricky Siahaan – guitars (2006)
- Babal – vocals (2006–2008)
- Prisa Adinda – guitars (2006–2008)
- Bonny Sidharta – bass (2006–2014)
- Coki Bollemeyer – guitars (2008–2016)
- Andyan Gorust – drums (2006–2017)
- Arslan Musyfia – bass (2014–2017)
- Anak Agung Gde Agung – bass (session player) (2017–2018)
- Daniel Mardhany – vocals (2008–2021)
- Welby Cahyadi – bass (2017–2021)
- Alvin Eka Putra - drums (2018–2020)
- Agustinus Widi – vocals (2021–2022)
- Shadu Rasjidi – bass (2021–2025)
- Vicky Mono – vocals (2022–2026)

=== Tour/session musician ===
- Ronal Adrian (2025–present)

== Discography ==
=== Studio albums ===
- Horror Vision (2009)
- Profanatik (2013)
- Tyranation (2016)
- Catharsis (2022)

=== Demo, EP, Singles and Split Albums ===
- Horror Vision Promo 2008 (2008)
- "Pragmatis Sintetis" (single) (2016)
- "Blessphemy" (single) (2018)
- 3593 Miles of Everloud Musik! (split) (2018)
- "Paranoid Skizoid" (single) (2021)
- "Curse of The Black Plague" (single) (2021)
- "Enigmatic Pandemonium" (single) (2022)
- "Perangai Nadir" (single) (2024)

== Awards and nominations ==
Year	Nominee / work	Award	Result	Ref.
2010	"Manufaktur Replika Baptis"	Favorite Metal Song - Indonesia Cutting Edge Music Awards (ICEMA)	Won	
2012	"Patriot Moral Prematur"	Best Death Metal Song - Indonesia Cutting Edge Music Awards (ICEMA)	Won	
2016	"DeadSquad"	Best Live Performance - Hammersonic Awards	Nominated	
2017	"Pragmatis Sintetis"	Karya Produksi Metal/Hardcore Terbaik - Anugerah Musik Indonesia (AMI) Awards	Won	
2017	"DeadSquad"	Breakthrough Of The Year - Hammersonic Awards	Nominated	
2017	"Tyranation"	Best Album Of The Year - Hammersonic Awards	Nominated	
2017	"DeadSquad"	Best Metal Performance - Hammersonic Awards	Nominated	
2022	"Catharsis" by Rizki Fathur	Best Album Design Graphics - Indonesian Music Awards	Nominated	
2022	"Curse of The Black Plague"	Best Metal Solo Male/Female/Group/Collaboration - Indonesian Music Awards	Nominated	
2022	Catharsis	Best Metal Album - Indonesian Music Awards	Won	
2023	Catharsis	Best Album - Hammersonic Awards	Won	
2023	Deadsquad	Best Metal Performance - Hammersonic Awards	Won	
2023	"Enigmatic Pandemonium"	Best Single - Hammersonic Awards	Nominated	
2023	"Enigmatic Pandemonium"	Best Male/Female/Group/Collaboration Metal Artist - 26th Anugerah Musik Indonesia	Won	
2025	"Perangai Nadir"	Best Solo/Group/Collaboration Metal Artist - 28th Anugerah Musik Indonesia	Won	
