= /rif =

Indonesian rock band

- Also known as: Balad (1985–1989); Badai Band (1989–1994)
- Origin: Bandung, Indonesia
- Genres: Pop rock; alternative rock; hard rock; power pop; glam metal; alternative metal
- Years active: 1985–present
- Labels: Sony; E-Motion; JD; Sabda Nada
- Members: Restu Triandy; Adjie Pamungkas; Noviar Rachmansyah; Teddy; Maggi Trisandi
- Past members: Abdee Negara; Aria Baron; Marshal Surya Rachman; Ardija Hermawan; Abi; Denny Rachman; Yuke Sampurna; Bambang Sutrisno; Ade; Dwi
- Website: rif-band.com (archived)

Rif (often styled as /rif) which stands for Rhythm in Freedom, is an alternative rock band formed in Bandung, Indonesia in 1995.

Considered as one of the best Indonesian rock band, the band is known for their hit singles, such as "Radja", "Bunga", "Si Hebat", "Aku Ingin" and "Loe Toe Ye". Their title "Dunia" also included in original soundtrack of Spider-Man (2002 film). Their song "Bunga" was listed 47th in Rolling Stone Indonesia's 150 best Indonesian songs.

Earlier in 2013, they release a compilation album which consist of new arrangement of their songs from their previous albums and several new songs such as "Party Lagi" and "Aku Tahu Ini Cinta", in the album they also cover two 1980s rock song of Ikang Fawzi ("Preman") dan Anggun C. Sasmi ("Takut feat. Judika").

== Band members ==
Current

- Restu Triandy ("Andy") – lead vocals, occasional guitars (1985–present)
- Adjie Pamungkas ("Jikun") – lead and rhythm guitars, backing vocals (1985–1991, 1994–present)
- Maggi Trisandi – drums (1994–present)
- Noviar Rachmansyah ("Ovy") – rhythm and lead guitars, backing vocals (2003–present)
- Teddy – bass (2012–present)

Former

- Ardija Hermawan – rhythm guitar (1985–1991); bass (1991–2007)
- Yuke Sampurna – bass (1985–1991)
- Ade – drums (1985–1994)
- Abdee Negara – lead guitar (1991–1992)
- Bambang Sutrisno – bass (1991)
- Dwi – keyboards (1991–1994)
- Abi – rhythm and lead guitars (1991–1993)
- Aria Baron – lead and rhythm guitars (1992–1994; died 2021)
- Denny Rachman – rhythm and lead guitars (1993–2003)
- Marshal Surya Rachman – lead and rhythm guitars (1994)

=== Timeline ===
1985–1991 (as Balad (1985–1989), Badai band (1989–1991))	Restu Triandy – vocals; Adjie Pamungkas – lead guitar; Ardija Hermawan – rhythm guitar; Yuke Sampurna – bass; Ade – drums
1991 (as Badai band)	Restu Triandy – vocals; Abdee Negara – lead guitar; Ardija Hermawan – rhythm guitar; Bambang Sutrisno – bass; Ade – drums
1991–1992 (as Badai band)	Restu Triandy – vocals; Abdee Negara – lead guitar; Abi – rhythm guitar; Ardija Hermawan – bass; Ade – drums; Dwi – keyboards
1992–1993 (as Badai band)	Restu Triandy – vocals; Aria Baron – lead and rhythm guitars; Abi – rhythm and lead guitars; Ardija Hermawan – bass; Ade – drums; Dwi – keyboards
1993–1994 (as Badai band)	Restu Triandy – vocals; Aria Baron – lead and rhythm guitars; Denny Rachman – rhythm and lead guitars; Ardija Hermawan – bass; Ade – drums; Dwi – keyboards
1994 (as Badai band)	Restu Triandy – vocals; Marshal Surya Rachman – lead and rhythm guitars; Denny Rachman – rhythm and lead guitars; Ardija Hermawan – bass; Ade – drums; Dwi – keyboards
1994–2003	Restu Triandy – lead vocals; Adjie Pamungkas – lead and rhythm guitars, backing vocals; Denny Rachman – rhythm and lead guitars; Ardija Hermawan – bass; Maggi Trisandi – drums
2003–2007	Restu Triandy – lead vocals; Adjie Pamungkas – lead and rhythm guitars, backing vocals; Noviar Rachmansyah – rhythm and lead guitars, backing vocals; Ardija Hermawan – bass; Maggi Trisandi – drums
2007–2012	Restu Triandy – lead vocals; Adjie Pamungkas – lead and rhythm guitars, backing vocals; Noviar Rachmansyah – rhythm and lead guitars, backing vocals; Maggi Trisandi – drums
2012–present	Restu Triandy – lead vocals; Adjie Pamungkas – lead and rhythm guitars, backing vocals; Noviar Rachmansyah – rhythm and lead guitars, backing vocals; Teddy – bass; Maggi Trisandi – drums

== Discography ==
Year	Album
1997	Radja
1999	Salami
2000	Nikmati Aja
2002	...Dan Duniapun Tersenyum
2004	The Best Of
2006	Pil Malu
2010	7
2013	18 Years of Rock
