= Purgatory (band) =

Indonesian metal band

- Origin: Jakarta, Indonesia
- Genres: Nu metal; death metal (early)
- Years active: 1991–present
- Labels: Rotocorp Records (early), An email Aneka Music Indonesia (early), Sony Music Indonesia (early), Dragdown Records
- Website: myspace.com/purgatorymogsaw

Purgatory is an Indonesian heavy metal band from Jakarta, formed in 1991. The band started out as a death metal group influenced by Obituary, but switched to a nu-metal sound reminiscent of Nothingface and Mudvayne by the time they began writing the second album. Purgatory wore outfits and masks around this time.

== History ==
Hendrie (bass/vocals), Lutfie (guitar), AL (drums), and Arief (guitars) formed Purgatory as a death metal band in 1991. They covered Obituary and Sepulturasongs. The name was inspired by a scene in A Nightmare on Elm Street where the word "PURGATORY" appears.

The band released their first EP, Abyss Call, in 1995. It was followed with the release of the Rotocorp Records compilation album Metalik Klinik I, to which Purgatory contributed the song "Sakaratul Maut". A year later, the band released their first album, Ambang Kepunahan, on Rotocorp Records

Working in this band made personnel feel limited by the genre. Emerging fresh ideas clashed with the band's locked musical status. By the year of 2002, the band added a DJ and another singer. The band also wore masks. Purgatory released their second studio album, 7:172 in 2003. This album saw Purgatory shift from death metal to nu metal. 7:172 brought the band fame, with the album's impact exceeding expectations. In this album, Edane guitarist Eet Sjahranie provides additional rhythm guitar on the first track, "Paranoia". Following the release of 7:172, Purgatory began appearing on compilation albums. In 2004, Morbid Noise Records included "Dragdown" on the Metaloblast compilation. In 2005, Purgatory contributed "Inside You" to the Gerbang 13 (Gate 13) OST. That same year, the song appeared on Sony BMG's Revolution of Sound compilation. That same year, the third track from the album 7:172, "M.O.G.S.A.W." (Messenger of God Sallallaahu Alayhi Wasallam, referring to Muhammad) appeared on the Sony BMG compilation Planet Rock. In 2006, Purgatory released their third studio album, Beauty Lies Beneath. That same year, they represented Indonesia in The Art of Metal, a compilation album by Century Media (Germany) and Alfa Record (Indonesia), alongside Napalm Death, Lacuna Coil, God Forbid, Shadows Fall and others. Purgatory contributed the song "Downfall (The Battle of Uhud)".

Purgatory lineups
(1992)	Lutfie "L.T.F." - guitars; Al – drums; Hendrie - bass & vocals; Arief - guitars
(1993)	Lutfie "L.T.F." - guitars; Al – drums; Hendrie - bass & vocals
(1993)	Lutfie "L.T.F." - guitars; Al – drums; Hendrie - bass & vocals; Erick - guitars
(1994)	Lutfie "L.T.F." - guitars; Al – drums; Hendrie - bass & vocals; Heila - guitars
(1994)	Lutfie "L.T.F." - guitars; Al – drums; Hendrie - bass & vocals; Bobby - guitars
(1994)	Lutfie "L.T.F." - guitars; Al – drums; Arie - vocals; Bobby - guitars/bass
(1995–1998)	Lutfie "L.T.F." - guitars; Al – drums; Arie - vocals; Ilan - bass
(1999)	Lutfie "L.T.F." - guitars; Al – drums; Arie - vocals; Budi "DIE" - guitars; Bobby - bass
(2000)	Lutfie "L.T.F." - guitars; Al – drums; Arie - vocals; Budi "DIE" - guitars; Bone - bass (additional)
(2001–2004)	Lutfie "L.T.F." - guitars; Al – drums; NTIE - bass; Budi "DIE" - guitars; Jesse Amor "Madmor" - growls; Sandy "Sandman" - turntable/vocals
(2004–2005)	Al – drums & samples; NTIE - bass; Lutfie "L.T.F." - guitars; Budi "D.I.E." - guitars; Jesse Amor "MadMor" - growls; Sandy "Sandman" - turntable & vocals; D'Jackal - synthesizers
(2005–2008)	Lutfie "L.T.F." - guitars; Al – drums & samples; Budi "D.I.E." - guitars; Jesse Amor "MadMor" - growls; Sandy "Sandman" - vocals; D'Jackal - turntable & synthesizers; Bone - bass
(2008–present)	Lutfie "L.T.F." - guitars; Al – drums & samples; BadArt - guitars; Apit "MadPit" - growls; Sandy "Sandman" - vocals; D'Jackal - turntable & synthesizers; Bone - bass

== Band name controversy ==
The band previously faced naming conflicts with foreign groups. A foreign lawyer asked them to change their name, but they declined.

== Discography ==
=== Studio albums ===
Album name	Record Company	Year
Ambang Kepunahan	Rotocorp Records	1999
7:172	Sony Music Indonesia	2003
Beauty Lies Beneath	Dragdown Records	2006

=== Mini albums ===
Album name	Record Company	Year
Abyss Call	(Self-Released)	1995

=== Compilation albums ===
Album name	Record Company	Contributed Song	Year
Metalik Klinik I	Rotocorp Records	"Sakaratul Maut"	1998
Metaloblast	Morbid Noise Records	"Dragdown"	2004
OST. Gerbang 13	dE Records	"Inside You"	2005
Revolution of Sound	Sony BMG	"Inside You"	2005
The Art of Metal	Century Media/Alfa Records	"Downfall (The Battle of Uhud)"	2006
