= Jasad (band) =

Indonesian death metal band

- Origin: Bandung, Indonesia
- Genres: Brutal death metal
- Years active: 1990–present
- Labels: Rottrevore Records, Sevared Records, Extreme Souls Production
- Members: Yuli Darma; Mohamad Rohman; Ferly; Reduan Purba; Oki Fadhlan
- Past members: Faried – drums (1990–1992); Tito Kelly – guitar (1990–1996); Hendrik – vocals (1992–1996); Abut – drums (1992–1994); Yayat Achdiat – guitar (1994–1999); Yadi Priadi – vocals (1994–1998); Dani Ramadhani – drums (1994–2011); Ricky Wisisena – guitar (1996); Sebastian Abaz – drums (2011–2016)

Jasad is a death metal band from Bandung, Indonesia, formed in 1990.

== Career ==
=== Formation, debut and second album (1990–2005) ===
The band was formed by bassist Yuli in 1990; the Indonesian word "Jasad" means "dead bodies". Yuli is the original member left today.

In their early years, the band had already have their own materials, but mostly were lost. Their first EP C'est La Vie was released in 1996 through Palapa Records, a local independent label from Bandung.

In 1999 vocalist Man and guitarist Ferly joined the band. The other two members were drummer Dani and original bassist Yuli. This would be their first solid line-up until 2011 when Dani quits. Their debut full-length album Witness of Perfect Torture was released in 2001 through Rottrevore Records, followed by two demos Ripping The Pregnant in 2001 and Demo 2005 in 2005.

The second album Annihilate The Enemy was released in 2005 through Sevared Records.

== Filmography ==
=== Split DVD, drummer change and third album (2005–present) ===
A split DVD named Rottrevore Death Fest was released in 2006. It's a split compilation DVD containing four Indonesian metal bands including Jasad. The three other bands are Siksakubur, Forgotten and Disinfected.

On 2011 Dani left the band, ending the 12 years of solid line-up since 1999. Dani was replaced by Abaz and the band released the third album Rebirth of Jatisunda in 2013 through Extreme Souls Production. Unlike their first two albums which contains several English lyrics, Rebirth of Jatisunda is a blend of Indonesian, Sundanese and English lyrics.

== Band members ==
=== Current members ===
- Yuli Darma – bass (1990–present)
- Popo Puji Apriantikasari - vocals (2025-present)
- Ferly – guitar (1999–present)
- Reduan Purba – guitar (2015–present)
- Oki Fadhlan – drums (2017–present)

=== Former members ===
- Faried – guitar (1990–1992)
- Tito Kelly – guitar (1990–1996)
- Hendrik – guitar (1992–1996)
- Abut – drums (1992–1994)
- Yayat Achdiat – guitar (1994–1999)
- Yadi Priadi – vocals (1994–1998)
- Dani Ramadhani – drums (1994–2011)
- Ricky Wisisena – guitar (1996)
- Sebastian Abas – drums (2011–2016)
- Mohamad Rohman – vocals (1999–2025)

== Discography ==
=== Studio albums ===
- Witness of Perfect Torture (2001)
- Annihilate the Enemy (2005)
- Rebirth of Jatisunda (2013)

=== Extended plays ===
- C'est La Vie (1996)
- 5 (2019)

=== Demos ===
- Ripping the Pregnant (2001)
- Demo 2005 (2005)
- Promo Demo (2011)

=== DVD ===
- Rottrevore Death Fest (split DVD, 2006)
