= Noxa (band) =

Indonesian band

- Origin: Jakarta, Indonesia
- Genres: Grindcore; heavy metal
- Years active: 2002–present
- Labels: Noxa Records; Stay Heavy Records; Off The Records
- Members: Ade Himernio Adnis; Dipa Biomantara; Alvin Eka Putra; Diego Shefa Dilanegara
- Past members: Robin Hutagaol; Tonny Christian Pangemanan (Deceased)
- Website: noxagrind.com

Noxa is an Indonesian grindcore band formed in Jakarta in 2002 by drummer Robin Hutagaol and guitarist Ade Himernio Adnis. The band are known for playing grindcore accompanied by political and humanistic lyrics.

== History ==
=== Formation ===
The band was formed by Ade Himernio Adnis and Robin Hutagaol. They soon picked up vocalist Tonny Christian Pangemanan and bassist Dipa Biomantara. The four member of the band shared the same university as students and have known each other for years, occasionally doing some local gigs together. At first they played cover songs from grindcore bands like Nasum and Napalm Death. The name Noxa was chosen because the members of the band were interested in its meaning. Noxa itself means something that exerts a harmful effect on the body.

=== Debut and second album ===
Soon after its inception, the band entered the studio in November 2002 for the recording of debut album. Under their own label Noxa Records, the band released self-titled debut album Noxa in August 2003. This was followed by some gigs in Malaysia and Singapore.

Two years after the release of Noxa, the band once again entered the studio to record their second album Grind Viruses. The album was released in 2006 and featured some musician including Keijo Niinimaa of Rotten Sound as lyricist in the song "Starvation". Originally released by Noxa Records, the album was later re-released by Finnish label, Stay Heavy Records, in 2008. In the same year, the band played in Tuska Open Air Metal Festival.

=== Third album and recent member changes ===
On January 17, 2009, drummer Robin Hutagaol died in a motorcycle accident. 6 months later, he was replaced by Alvin Eka Putra, this was followed by planning for recording the third album. During this times, Noxa played in Obscene Extreme Festival in Czech Republic.

The third album Legacy was recorded in early 2011. It contains 19 tracks, seven of which were previously drum tracked by Robin Hutagaol before his death. The album was released in July 2011 through Off The Records and once again also featuring other musicians including Jason Netherton of Misery Index and Shane McLachlan of the band Phobia.

On September 14, 2019, vocalist Tonny Christian Pangemanan left the band due to health reason. A new singer Diego Shefa was first announced to public in December 2019. After a year of battling his illness, Tonny Pangemanan died on November 13, 2020.

== Musical style ==
Noxa are known to bring political sociology and humanity theme lyrics in their music. Most of their songs are grindcore typical with short duration, lasting only 1 or 2 minutes or even a few seconds.

== Band members ==
Current members

- Ade Himernio Adnis – guitars (2002–present)
- Dipa Biomantara – bass guitar (2002–present)
- Alvin Eka Putra – drums (2009–present)
- Diego Shefa Dila Negara – vocals (2020–present)

Former member

- Robin Hutagaol – drums (2002–2009; died 2009)
- Tonny Christian Pangemanan – vocals (2002–2019; Died 2020)

Timeline

== Discography ==
=== Studio albums ===
Title	Album details
Noxa	Released: November 1, 2003; Label: Noxa Records, Off The Records; Formats: CD, cassette
Grind Viruses	Released: October 1, 2006; Labels: Indonesia: Noxa Records, Off The Records; Finland: Stay Heavy Records; Formats: CD, digital download
Legacy	Released: July 2011; Label: Off The Records; Format: CD

=== Extended plays ===
Title	EP details
Buka Mata	Released: February 14, 2016; Label: Armstretch Records; Format: CD
