= Seringai =

Indonesian metal band

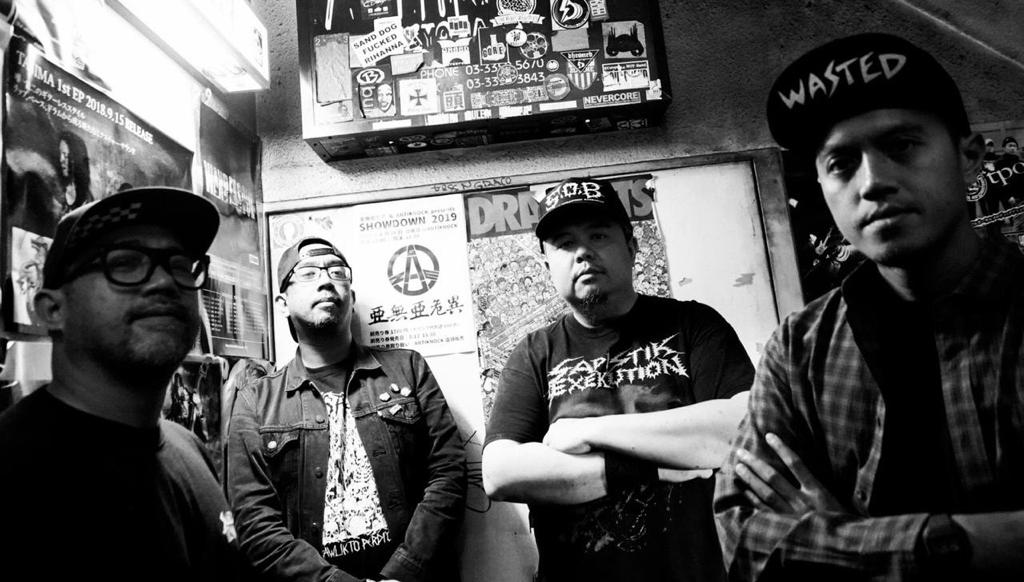

Background information
- Origin: Jakarta, Indonesia
- Genres: Stoner metal; stoner rock; crossover thrash; alternative metal; hardcore punk; groove metal; grindcore (early)
- Years active: 2002–present
- Labels: High Octane Production; Universal Music Indonesia; Stockroom Recordings; Demajors
- Members: Arian13; Sammy Bramantyo; Edy Khemod
- Past members: Toan; Ricky Siahaan (died 2025)
- Website: seringai.com

Seringai is an Indonesian heavy metal band from Jakarta. The band was founded in 2002 by vocalist Arian13, guitarist Ricky Siahaan, bassist Sammy Bramantyo, and drummer Edy Khemod.

== History ==
=== 2002–2008: Formation and debut album ===
Arian13 and Siahaan decided to form a new band after Arian13's previous band, Puppen, disbanded, with Khemod and Toan subsequently joining them. Toan quit the band in 2004 and was replaced by Sammy Bramantyo.

Their first EP, entitled High Octane Rock, was released in 2004. The title was a self-description of their particular style, listing Black Sabbath, Motörhead, MC5, and Slayer among their influences. The songs released on the EP, including "Membakar Jakarta", were already popular among their growing fanbase. The band had indeed played songs from the EP frequently on their gigs before its release.

In 2007, Seringai released their debut album Serigala Militia.

=== 2009–2012: DVD Generasi Menolak Tua and second album Taring ===
A box set DVD named Generasi Menolak Tua, a documentary about the band's history directed by Bramantyo was released in 2010. Several cameos appear in the video ranging from musicians, music journalists, actresses, and fans.

In April 2012, after five years without a release, Seringai released the single "Tragedi" freely via their official website. Siahaan explained that "after five years with no albums released," the band owed something to their fans.

The second album Taring was released two months later in July 2012, selling 999 copies in the first two days. Before the release, the band said that heavy rock influence is dominant in the album, while the lyrics are critical about social and political issues. Others have a science fiction theme.

=== 2013–present: Opening act for Metallica and Future ===
On 25 August 2013, Seringai was billed as the only opening act for a Metallica concert in Jakarta.

In November 2013 Seringai released their second EP titled Tragedi/Sang lelaki. It's a 7" vinyl record containing the song "Tragedi" and a previously unreleased track "Sang Lelaki". The EP was a limited edition of 300 copies, and all were sold out by the time of the record release.

=== Death ===
On 20 April 2025, Siahaan collapsed backstage and died moments after playing at Gekiko Fest.

== Discography ==
=== Studio albums ===
Title	Album details
Serigala Militia	Released: 2007; Label: High Octane Production; Format: CD
Taring	Released: 11 July 2012; Label: High Octane Production; Formats: CD, LP
Seperti Api	Released: 29 July 2018; Label: High Octane Production; Format: CD

=== Extended plays ===
Title	EP details
High Octane Rock	Released: 2004; Label: Parau Records; Format: CD, LP, cassette
Tragedi/Sang Lelaki	Released: November 2013; Label: Stockroom Recordings; Format: 7" vinyl

=== Singles ===
Title	Year	Album
"Tragedi"	2012	Tragedi/Sang Lelaki

=== DVD ===
Title	Details
Generasi Menolak Tua	Released: 28 February 2010; Label: Self-released; Format: DVD
